= Protocarnivorous plant =

Carnivorous plant that can not digest prey

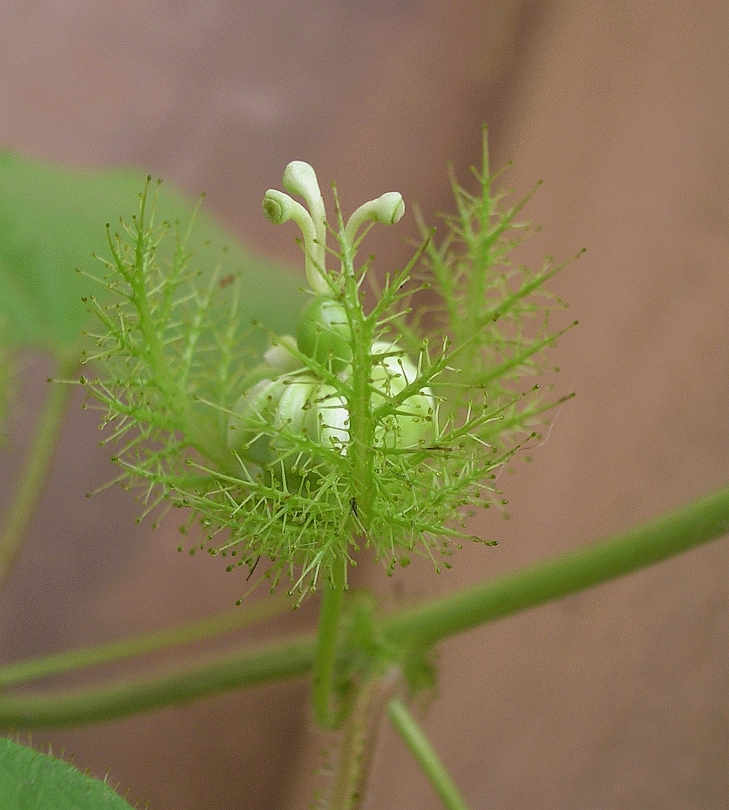
Mucilage-tipped bracts and immature flower of Passiflora foetida, a protocarnivorous plant.

A protocarnivorous plant (sometimes also paracarnivorous, subcarnivorous, or borderline carnivore), according to some definitions, traps and kills insects or other animals but lacks the ability to either directly digest or absorb nutrients from its prey like a carnivorous plant. The morphological adaptations such as sticky trichomes or pitfall traps of protocarnivorous plants parallel the trap structures of confirmed carnivorous plants.

Some authors prefer the term "protocarnivorous" because it implies that these plants are on the evolutionary path to true carnivory, whereas others oppose the term for the same reason. The same problem arises with "subcarnivorous". Donald Schnell, author of the book Carnivorous Plants of the United States and Canada, prefers the term "paracarnivorous" for a less rigid definition of carnivory that can include many of the possible carnivorous plants.

The demarcation between carnivorous and protocarnivorous is blurred by the lack of a strict definition of botanical carnivory and ambiguous academic literature on the subject. Many examples of protocarnivorous plants exist, some of which are counted among the ranks of true carnivorous plants as a matter of historical preference. Further research into these plants' carnivorous adaptations may reveal that a few protocarnivorous plants do meet the more rigid definition of a carnivorous plant.

== Historical observations ==
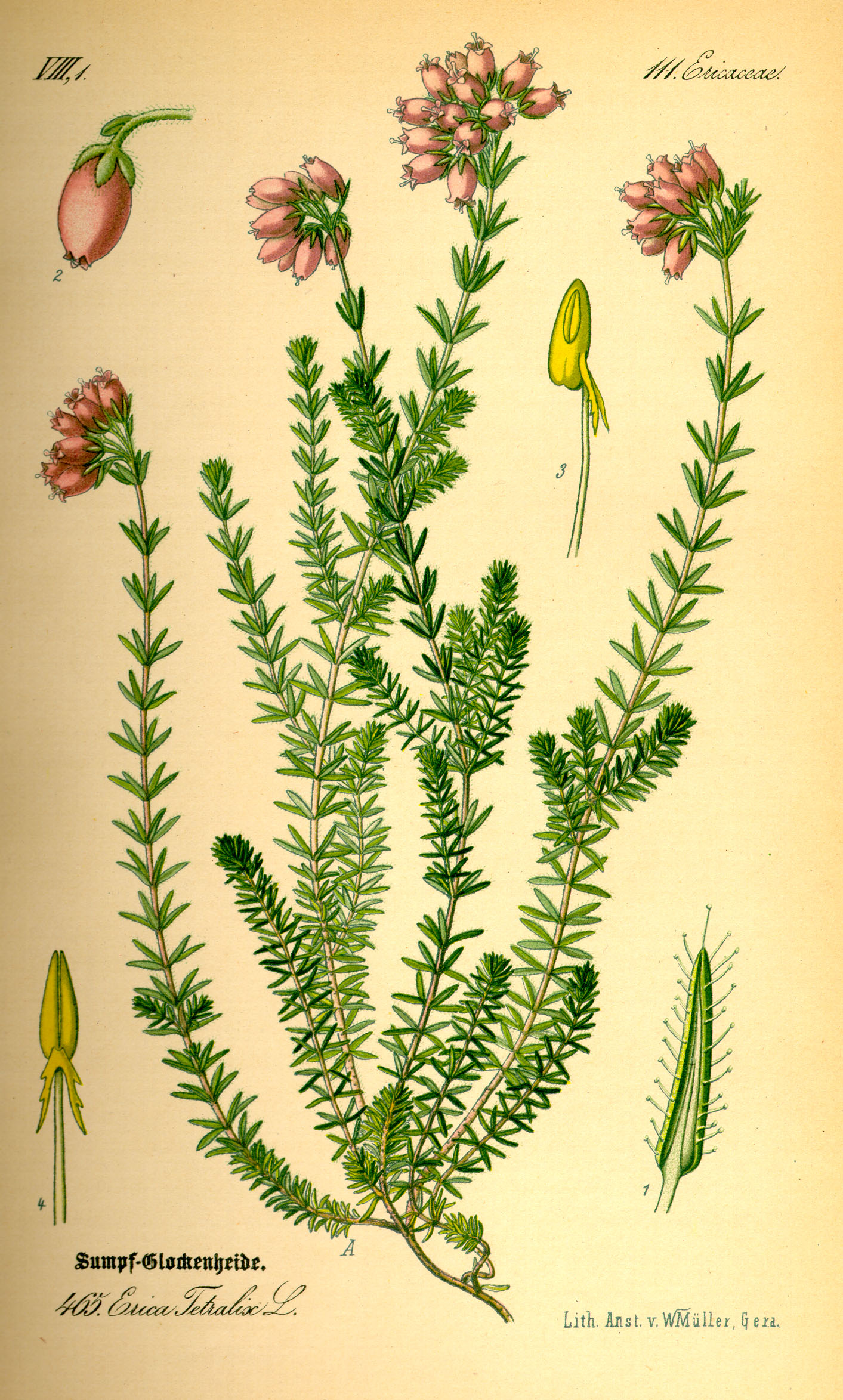
Charles Darwin postulated that Erica tetralix might be carnivorous

Historical observations of the carnivorous syndrome in plant species have been restricted to the more obvious examples of carnivory, such as the active trapping mechanisms of Drosera (the sundews) and Dionaea (Venus flytrap), though authors have often noted speculation about other species that may not be so obviously carnivorous. In one of the earlier publications on carnivorous plants, Charles Darwin had suggested many plants that have developed adhesive glands, such as Erica tetralix, Mirabilis longifolia, Pelargonium zonale, Primula sinesis, and Saxifraga umbrosa, may indeed be carnivorous but little research has been done on them. Darwin himself only mentioned these species in passing and did not follow through with any investigation. Adding to the small but growing list, Francis Lloyd provided his own list of species suspected of carnivory in his 1942 book on carnivorous plants, though these species and their potential were only mentioned in the introduction. Later, in a 1981 review of the literature, Paul Simons rediscovered Italian journal articles from the early 1900s that identified several additional sticky species that digested insect prey. Simons was surprised to find these articles lacking in the literature cited sections of many modern books and articles on carnivorous plants, suggesting that academic research has treated Lloyd's 1942 book as the authoritative and comprehensive source on pre-1942 research on the carnivorous syndrome.

== Defining carnivory ==
Debate about what criteria a plant must meet to be considered carnivorous has yielded two proposed definitions: one with strict requirements and the other less restrictive.

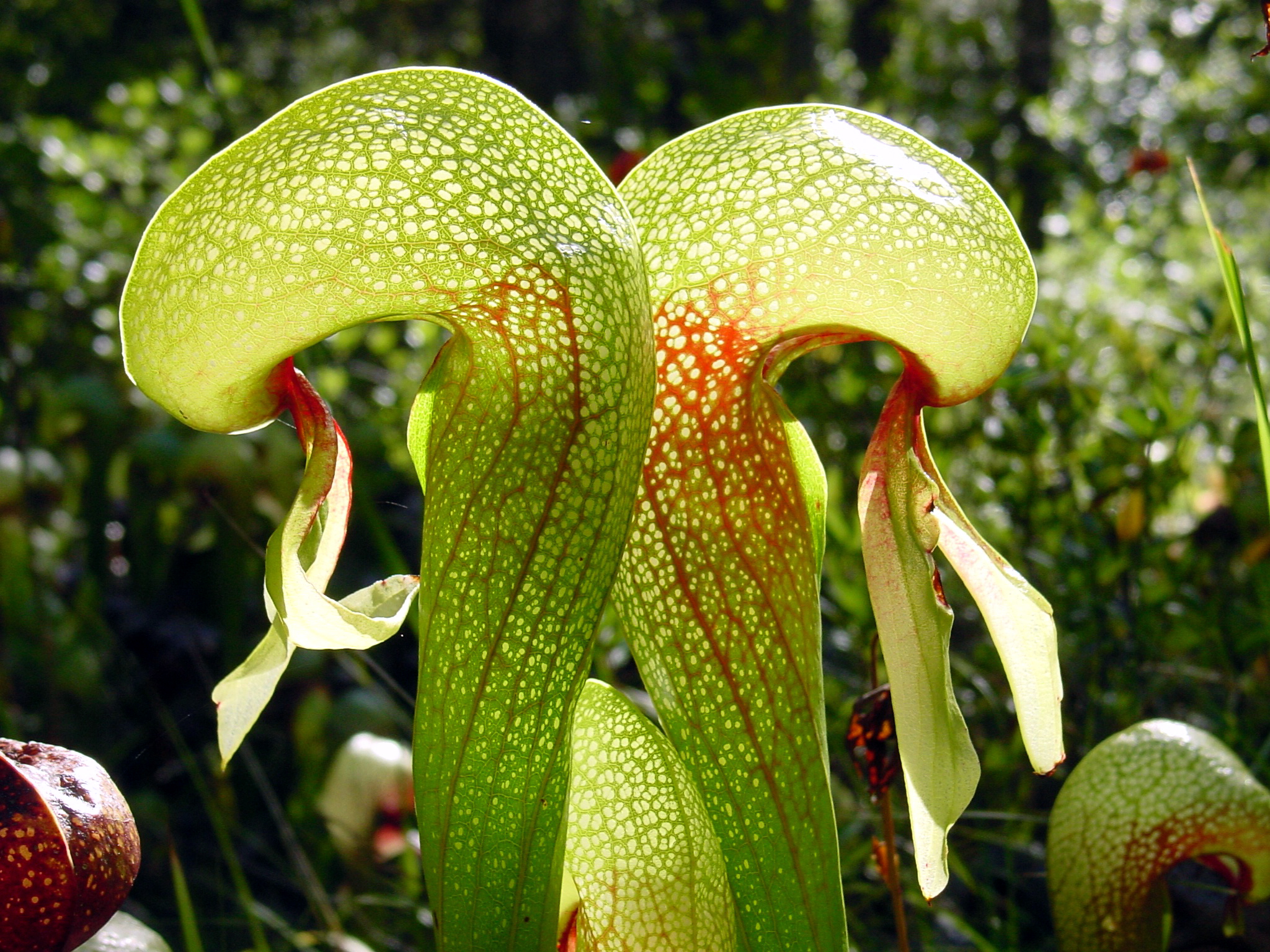
Darlingtonia californica does not produce its own digestive enzymes.

The strict definition requires that a plant must possess morphological adaptations that attract prey through scent or visual cues, capture and retain prey (e.g., the waxy scales of Brocchinia reducta or downward facing hairs of Heliamphora prevent escape), digest the dead prey through enzymes produced by the plant, and absorb the products of digestion through specialized structures. The presence of commensals is also listed as strong evidence of a long evolutionary history of carnivory. By this definition, many sun pitcher plants (Heliamphora) and the cobra lily (Darlingtonia californica) would not be included on a roster of carnivorous plants because they rely on symbiotic bacteria and other organisms to produce the necessary proteolytic enzymes.

The broader definition differs mainly in including plants that do not produce their own digestive enzymes but rely on internal food webs or microbes to digest prey, such as Darlingtonia and some species of Heliamphora. The original definition of botanical carnivory, set out in Givnish et al. (1984), required a plant to exhibit an adaptation of some trait specifically for the attraction, capture, or digestion of prey while gaining a fitness advantage through the absorption of nutrients derived from said prey. Upon further analysis of genera currently considered carnivorous, botanists widened the original definition to include species that use mutualistic interactions for digestion.

Both the strict and broad definitions require absorption of the digested nutrients. The plant must receive some benefit from the carnivorous syndrome; that is, the plant must display some increase in fitness because of the nutrients obtained from its carnivorous adaptations. Increased fitness might mean improved growth rate, increased chance of survival, higher pollen production or seed set.

== Degrees of carnivory ==
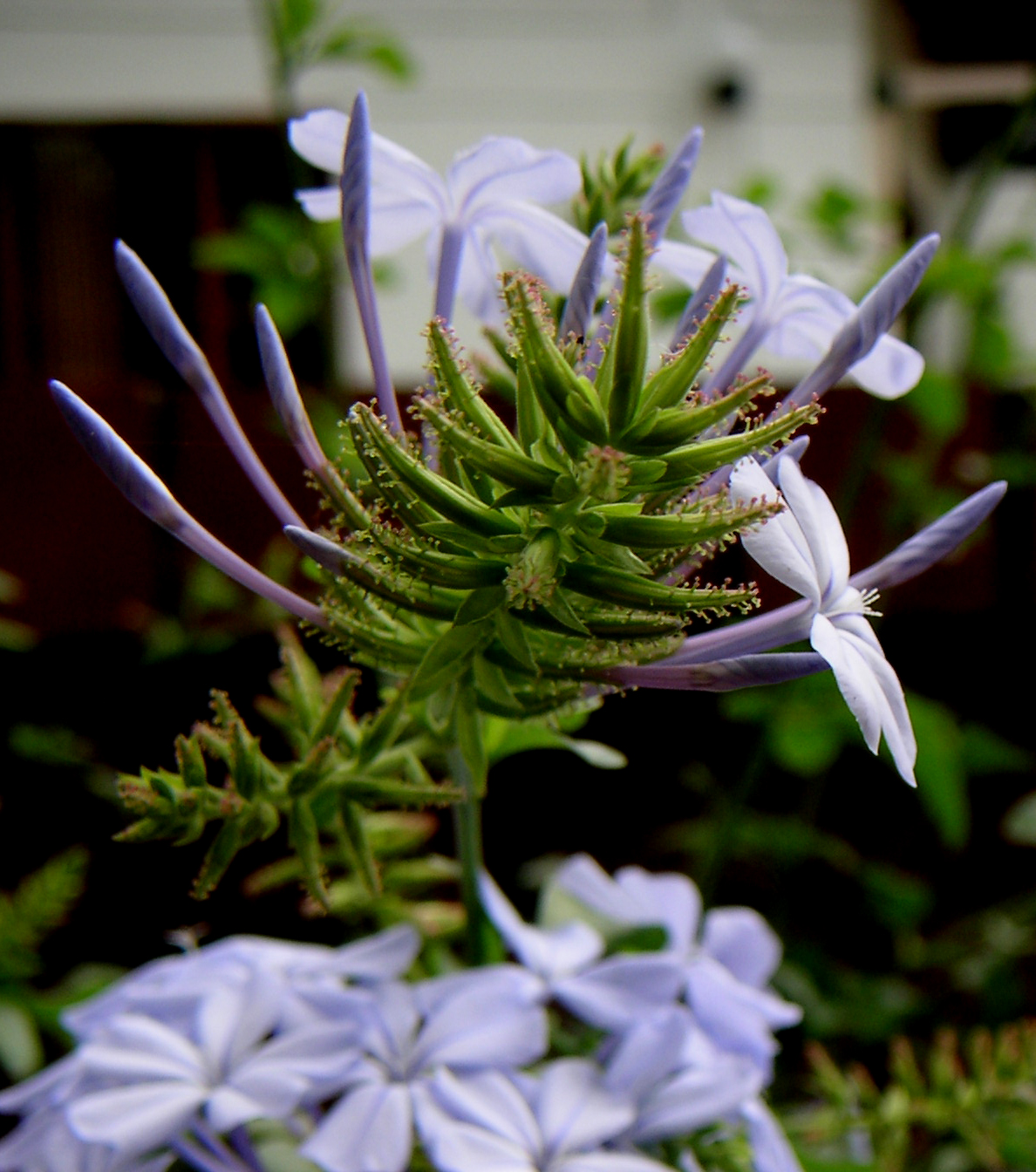
Plumbago auriculata, showing the abundant trichomes present on the calyces.

One prevailing idea is that carnivory in plants is not a black and white duality, but rather a spectrum from strict non-carnivorous photoautotrophs (a rose, for example) to fully carnivorous plants with active trapping mechanisms like those of Dionaea or Aldrovanda. However, passive traps are still considered fully carnivorous. Plants that fall between the definitions in the strict carnivorous/non-carnivorous demarcation can be defined as being protocarnivorous.

It is thought that these plants that have evolved protocarnivorous habits typically reside in habitats where there is a significant nutrient deficiency, but not the severe deficiency in nitrogen and phosphorus seen where true carnivorous plants grow. The function of the protocarnivorous habit, however, need not be directly related to lack of nutrient access. Some classic protocarnivorous plants represent convergent evolution in form but not necessarily in function. Plumbago, for example, possesses glandular trichomes on its calyces that structurally resemble the tentacles of Drosera and Drosophyllum. The function of the Plumbago tentacles is, however, disputed. Some contend that their function is to aid in pollination, adhering seeds to visiting pollinators. Others note that on some species (Plumbago auriculata), small, crawling insects have been trapped in the Plumbago's mucilage, which supports the conclusion that these tentacles could have evolved to exclude crawling insects and favor flying pollinators for greater seed dispersal or perhaps for protection against crawling insect predators.

== Trapping mechanisms ==
There are visible parallels between the trapping mechanisms of carnivorous plants and protocarnivorous plants. Plumbago and other species with glandular trichomes resemble the flypaper traps of Drosera and Drosophyllum. The pitfall traps of protocarnivorous plants, such as some Heliamphora species and Darlingtonia californica, are so similar to those of true carnivorous plants that the only reason they may be considered protocarnivorous instead of carnivorous is that they do not produce their own digestive enzymes. There are also protocarnivorous bromeliads that form a pitfall trap in an "urn" of rosetted leaves that are held together tightly. There are also other plants that produce a sticky mucilage not necessarily associated with a tentacle or glandular trichome, but instead can be described more like a slime capable of trapping and killing insects.

=== Flypaper traps ===
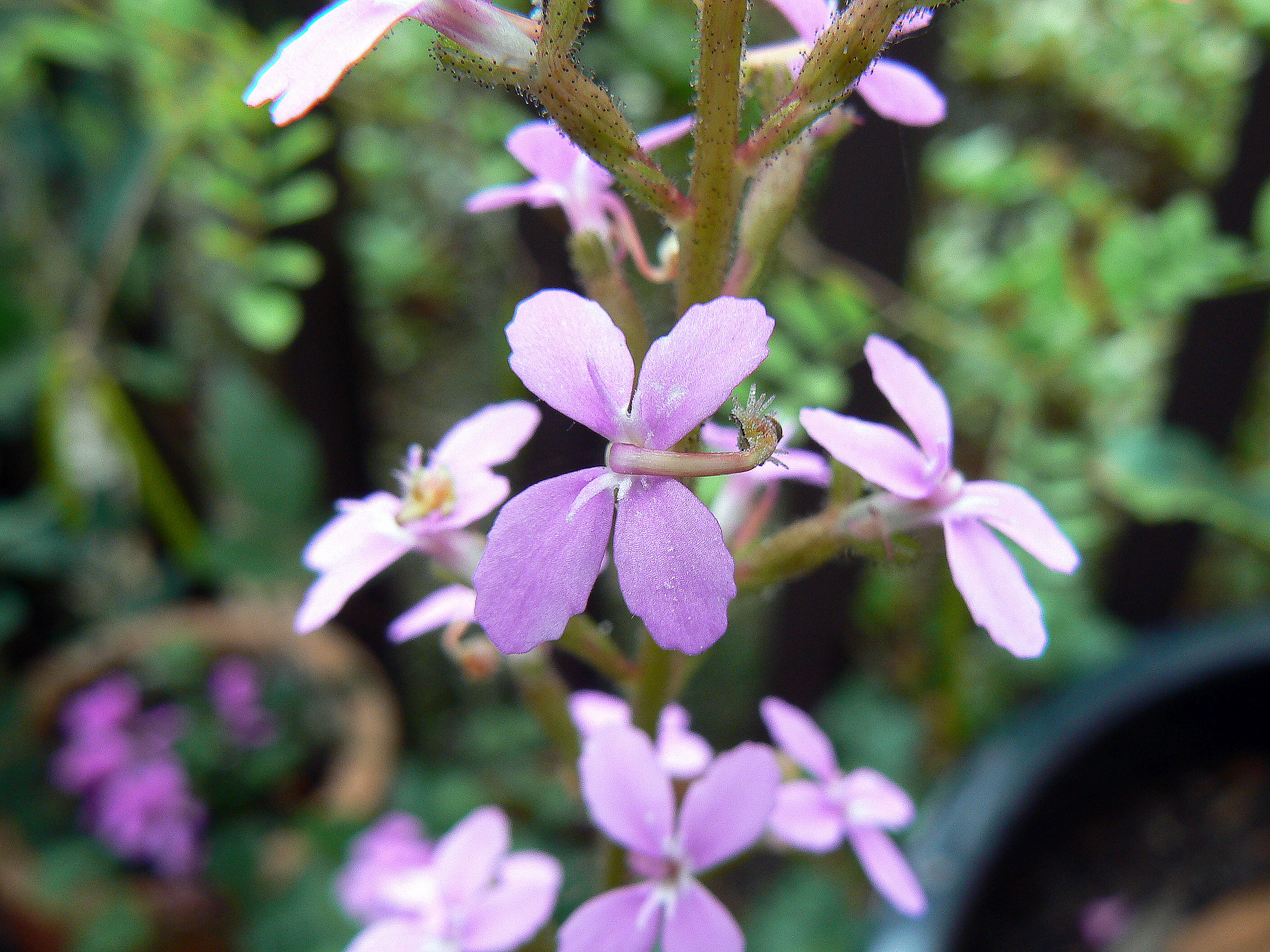
A protocarnivorous flypaper trap below the flowers of Stylidium productum.

Dr. George Spomer of the University of Idaho has discovered protocarnivorous activity and function in several glandular plant species, including Cerastium arvense, Ipomopsis aggregata, Heuchera cylindrica, Mimulus lewisii, Penstemon attenuata, Penstemon diphyllus, Potentilla glandulosa var. intermedia, Ribes cereum, Rosa nutkana var. hispida, Rosa woodsii var. ultramontana, Solanum tuberosum, Stellaria americana, and Stellaria jamesiana. These species tested positive for protease activity, though it is unclear whether the protease is produced by the plant or by surface microbes. Two other species evaluated by Dr. Spomer, Geranium viscosissimum and Potentilla arguta, exhibited protease activity and were further examined with ^{14}C-labeled algal protein for nutrient absorption activity. Both of these latter species displayed an ability to digest and absorb the labeled protein.

Other plants that are considered to be protocarnivorous have sticky trichomes on some surface, such as the flower scape and bud of Stylidium and Plumbago, the bracts of Passiflora, and leaves of Roridula. The trichomes of Stylidium, which appear below the flower, have been known to trap and kill small insects since their discovery several centuries ago, but their purpose remained ambiguous. In November 2006, Dr. Douglas Darnowski published a paper describing the active digestion of proteins when they come in contact with a trichome of a Stylidium species grown in aseptic tissue culture, proving that the plant, rather than the surface microbes, was the source of protease production. Darnowski asserts in that paper that given this evidence, Stylidium species are properly called carnivorous, though in order to fulfill the strict definition of carnivory it needs to be proven that they are capable of absorbing nutrients derived from prey and that this adaptation gives the plants some competitive advantage.

The glandular hairs on the calyx of plants of the genus Plumbago have been proposed as a potential carnivorous adaptation. While these calyxes have long been considered as a seed dispersal mechanism, many researchers have noted the entrapment of numerous ants and other small insects on the species Plumbago auriculata, Plumbago europea, Plumbago indica, and Plumbago zeylanica. Studies on P. auriculata and P. indica detected potential protease activity from these glands, but were inconsistent in detecting it. Energy-dispersive X-ray spectroscopy spectra of the glands on P. auriculata and P. zeylanica found that the glandular secretions were composed mainly of the elements C, O, Si, Mg, and Al. One such species, P. europaea, has also been noted to kill small birds by covering them in sticky calyxes, causing them to be unable to fly and subsequently die. A similar sticky-seed killing mechanism has been studied Pisonia grandis, but was concluded to not be a carnivorous adaptation.

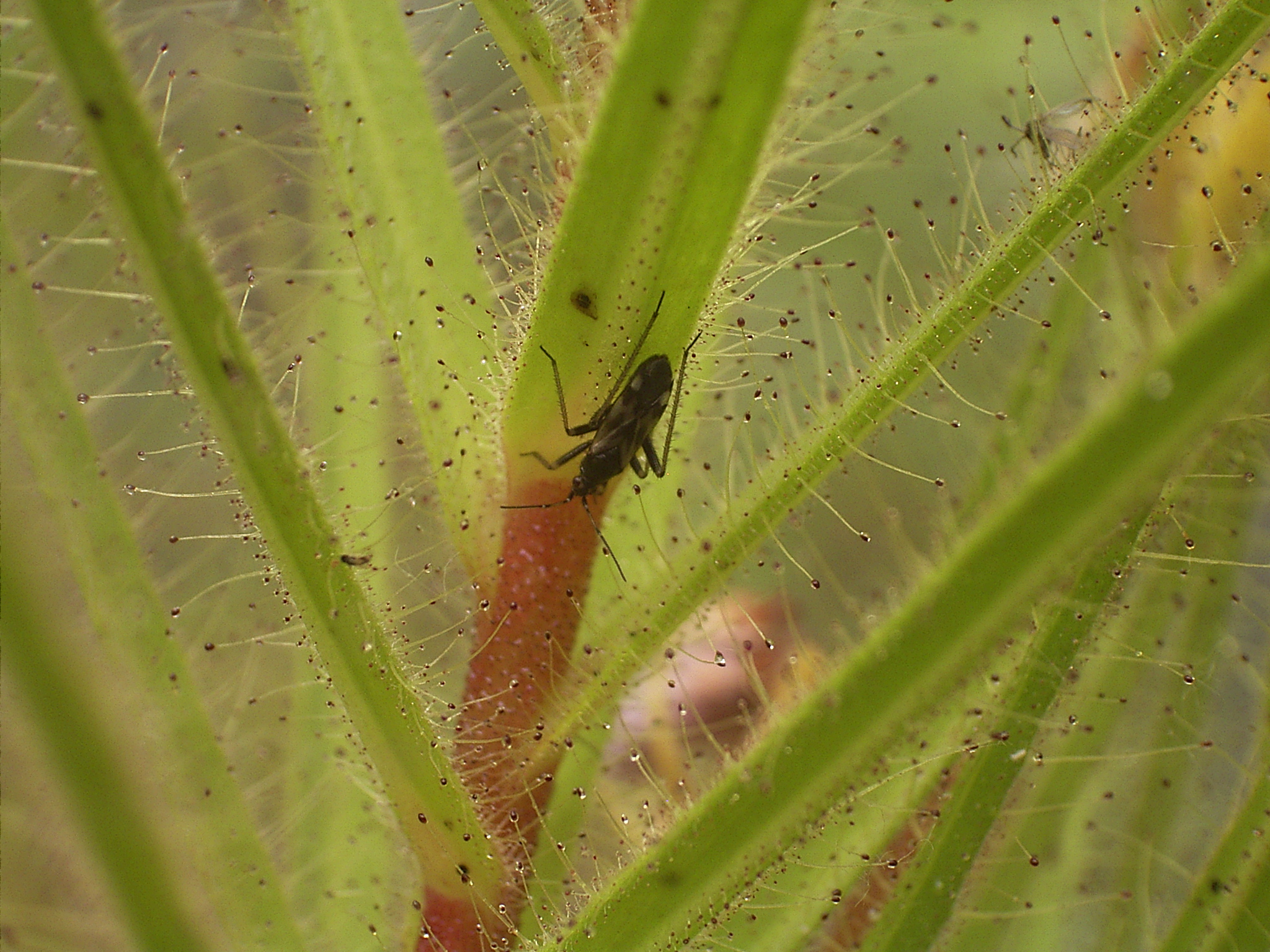
An assassin bug (Pameridea roridulae) on Roridula gorgonias, which obtains nutrients from its 'prey' via the droppings of the assassin bug.

Roridula has a more complex relationship with its prey. The plants in this genus produce sticky leaves with resin-tipped glands that look similar to those of larger Drosera. However, the resin, unlike mucilage, is unable to carry digestive enzymes. Therefore, Roridula species do not directly benefit from the insects they catch. Instead, they form a mutualistic symbiosis with species of assassin bugs that eat the trapped insects. The plant benefits from the nutrients in the bugs' feces.

Likewise, the sticky, modified bracts of passion flowers of the section Dysosmia have notable glandular bracts that surround flowers and forming fruit. While this has long been discussed as a defense mechanism, studies of Passiflora foetida have investigated them for potential carnivorous abilities. A 1995 paper published in the Journal of Biosciences detailed the evidence that the glandular bracts played a distinct role in defense of the flower and were also capable of digesting captured prey and absorbing the nutrients. Various authors have questioned the methods and conclusions of this paper. Further studies using on the glandular bracts using histochemical tests have confirmed the presence of enzymes in both Passiflora foetida and Passiflora sublanceolata.

Various plants of the Martyniaceae family have been considered crude flypaper protocarnivores. Early publications identified the entrapment of numerous insects on the glandular hairs covering the stems and leaves of Martynia annua, Proboscidea louisiana, Proboscidea parviflora, and Ibicella lutea. Early, rudimentary studies showed that placed bits of food—beef and hard-boiled egg white broke down when placed on the leaf surface ofP. louisiana and I. lutea, respectively. Despite this, more recent studies have suggested that there are no detectable proteases on the leaves of I. lutea and P. louisiana and no detectable phosphatases or uptake of N, P, K, Mg from dried flies places on I. lutea and P. parviflora. Observations have suggested that there may be a digestive mutualism between carnivorous insects and the sticky plant surface similar to Roridula. A similar relationship has been identified in many other sticky desert plants and concluded to be a passive defense mechanism.

=== Pitfall traps ===
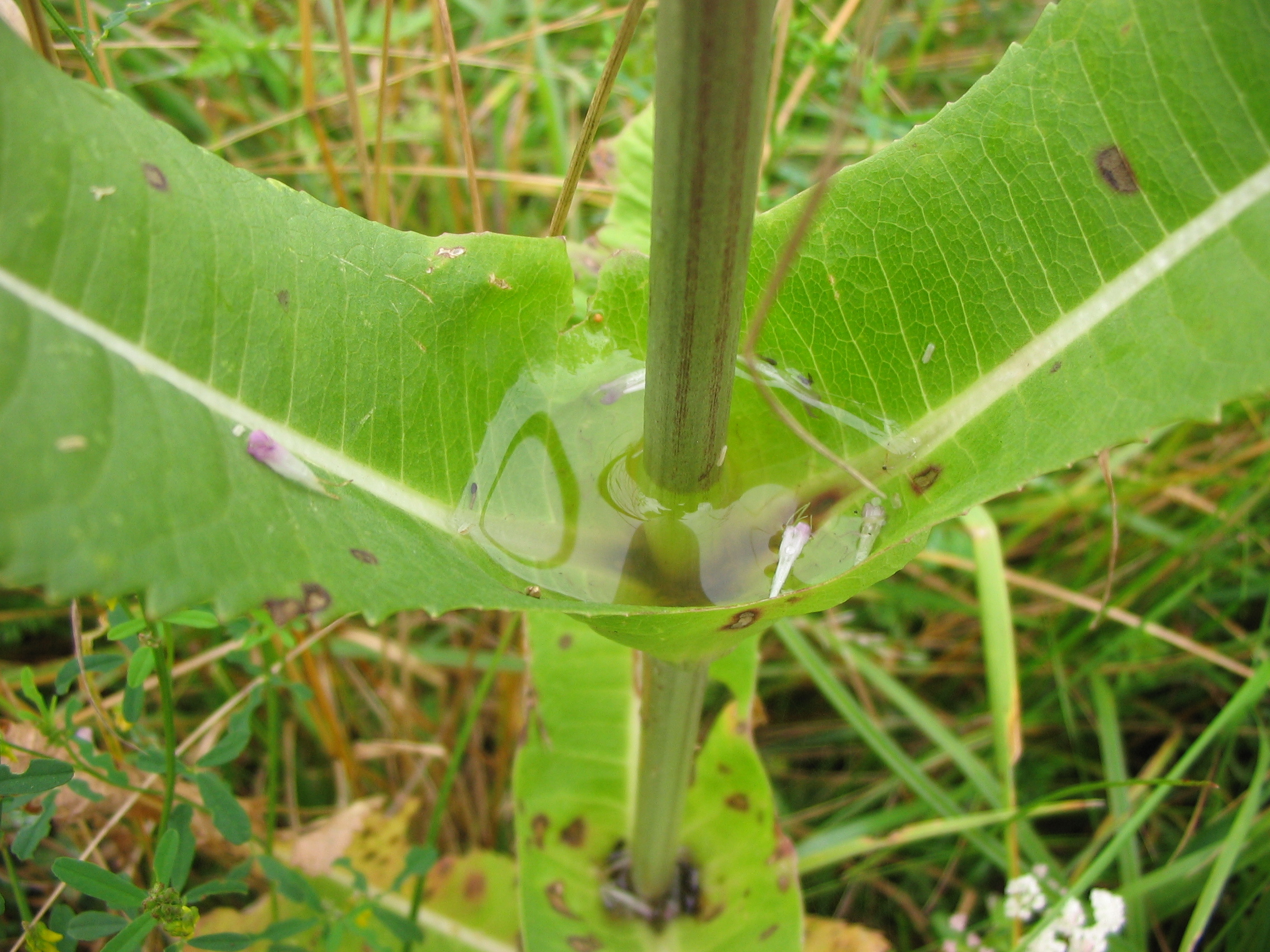
The water reservoir of Dipsacus fullonum, a pitfall trap.

The pitfall traps of protocarnivorous plants are identical to those of carnivorous plants in every way except in the plant's mode of digestion. The rigid definition of carnivory in plants requires digestion of prey by enzymes produced by the plant. Given this criterion, many of the pitfall trap plants commonly considered to be carnivorous would instead be classified as protocarnivorous. However, this is highly contentious and generally not reflected in current carnivorous plant phylogenies or literature. Darlingtonia californica and several Heliamphora species do not produce their own enzymes, relying instead on an internal food web to break down the prey into absorbable nutrients.

Another pitfall trap form unrelated to the Sarraceniaceae family are the urns of bromeliad leaves that are formed when leaves are tightly packed together in a rosette, collecting water and trapping insects. Unlike Brocchinia reducta, which has been proven to produce at least one digestive enzyme and can therefore be considered carnivorous, the epiphytic Catopsis berteroniana has little evidence supporting the claims that it is carnivorous. It is able to attract and kill prey and the trichomes on the surface of the leaves can absorb nutrients, but so far no enzyme activity has been detected. It may be that this plant also relies on an internal food web for soft tissue digestion. The same could be said for Paepalanthus bromelioides, though it is a member of Eriocaulaceae and not a bromeliad. It also forms a central water reservoir that has adaptations to attract insects. It, like C. berteroniana, produces no digestive enzymes.

Another potential protocarnivorous pitfall trap is a species of teasel, Dipsacus fullonum, which has been only suggested as a possible carnivore. Only one major study has examined D. fullonum for carnivory and no evidence of digestive enzymes or foliar nutrient absorption was revealed.

=== Other ===
Capsella bursa-pastoris, Shepherd's purse, is another plant where the claim of carnivory is contested. This unique protocarnivorous plant is only capable of capturing and digesting prey during one stage of its life cycle. The seeds of the plant, when moistened, secrete a Mucilage that attracts and kills prey. There is also evidence of protease activity and absorption of nutrients. More recent studies have suggested that the plants may benefit from the feeding of Nematodes to the seeds of the plants, but due to a small sample size such conclusions cannot be made. Other plants such as Descurainia pinnata, Descurainia sophia, Hirschfeldia incana, and Lepidium flavum were also noted to entrap small insects. Mucilage production by seeds is fairly common in the plant kingdom and is typically associated with root and shoot penetration. Further work to identify the nutrient fluxes in this seed-insect system in-situ are required to understand any carnivorous aspects of this system.

Puya raimondii and Puya chilensis are two large arid bromeliads that have been suspected of being proto-carnivorous plants due to their entrapment of small animals in their spiny leaves. Puya raimondii was noted to have associated with numerous birds, some of which would become ensnared in the spiky foliage and die. It is hypothesized that this, as well as dropping from the birds who lived amongst the leaves, are a source of nutrients upon decomposition and subsequent foliage absorption by the plant. Similarly, Puya chilensis was noted to ensnare livestock such as sheep who, unless rescued would degrade and feed the plant. Despite this, the adaptations seen in Puya that lead to ensnarement of animals seems most likely to be a defense mechanism.

== Loss of carnivory ==
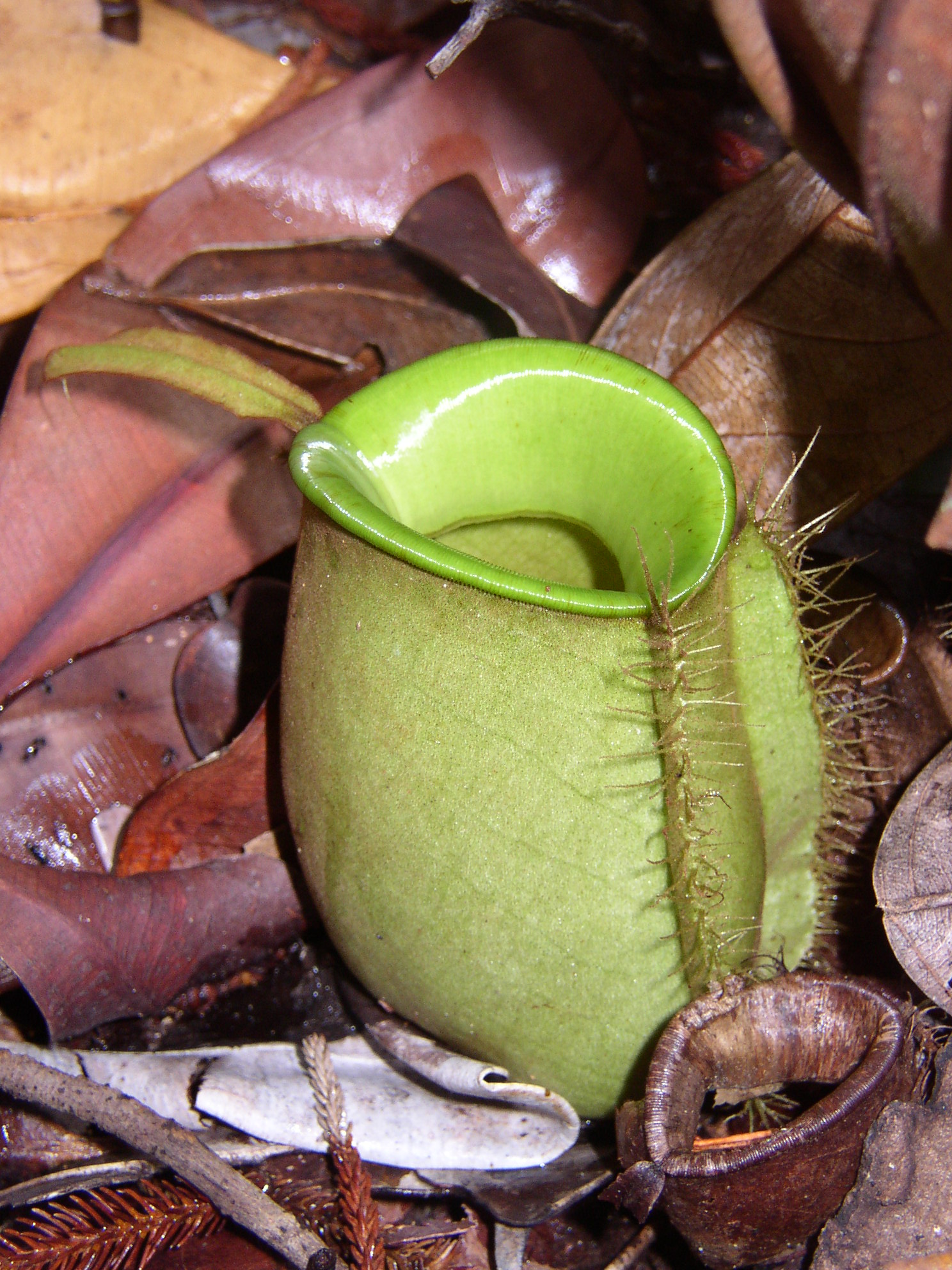
Nepenthes ampullaria is well-adapted to capture leaf litter.

A few plants that could be considered protocarnivorous or paracarnivorous are those that once had carnivorous adaptations but appear to be evolving or have evolved away from a direct prey relationship with arthropods and rely on other sources for obtaining nutrients. One example of such a phenomenon is the pitfall trap of Nepenthes ampullaria, a tropical pitcher plant. Although it retains its ability to attract, capture, kill, and digest insect prey, this species has acquired adaptations that appear to favor digestion of leaf litter. It could potentially be referred to as a detritivore. Another tropical pitcher plant, Nepenthes lowii, is known to catch very few prey items compared to other Nepenthes. Preliminary observations suggest that this particular species may have moved away from a solely (or even primarily) carnivorous nature and be adapted to "catching" the droppings of birds feeding at its nectaries. A 2009 study found that mature N. lowii plants derived 57–100% of their foliar nitrogen from treeshrew droppings.

Utricularia purpurea, a bladderwort, comes from another genus of carnivorous plants and may have lost its carnivory, at least in part. This species can still trap and digest arthropod prey in its specialized bladder traps, but does so sparingly. Instead, it harbors a community of algae, zooplankton, and debris in the bladders, giving rise to the hypothesis that the bladders of U. purpurea favor a mutualistic interaction in place of a predator-prey relationship.

== Evolution ==
The disciplines of ecology and evolutionary biology have presented several hypotheses on the evolution of carnivorous plants that may also apply to protocarnivorous plants. The name "protocarnivorous plant" itself suggests that these species are on their way to carnivory, though others may simply be an example of a defense-related adaptation, such as that found in Plumbago. Still others (Utricularia purpurea, Nepenthes ampullaria, and Nepenthes lowii) may be examples of carnivorous plants moving away from the carnivorous syndrome.

In his 1998 book, Interrelationship Between Insects and Plants, Pierre Jolivet only considered four species of plants to be protocarnivorous: Catopsis berteroniana, Brocchinia reducta, B. hectioides, and Paepalanthus bromeloides. Jolivet writes, "It is important to remember that all carnivorous plants are dicots and all protocarnivorous plants are monocots," though he does not explain why nor does he describe his reasons for excluding other dicotyledonous plants that are protocarnivorous.
