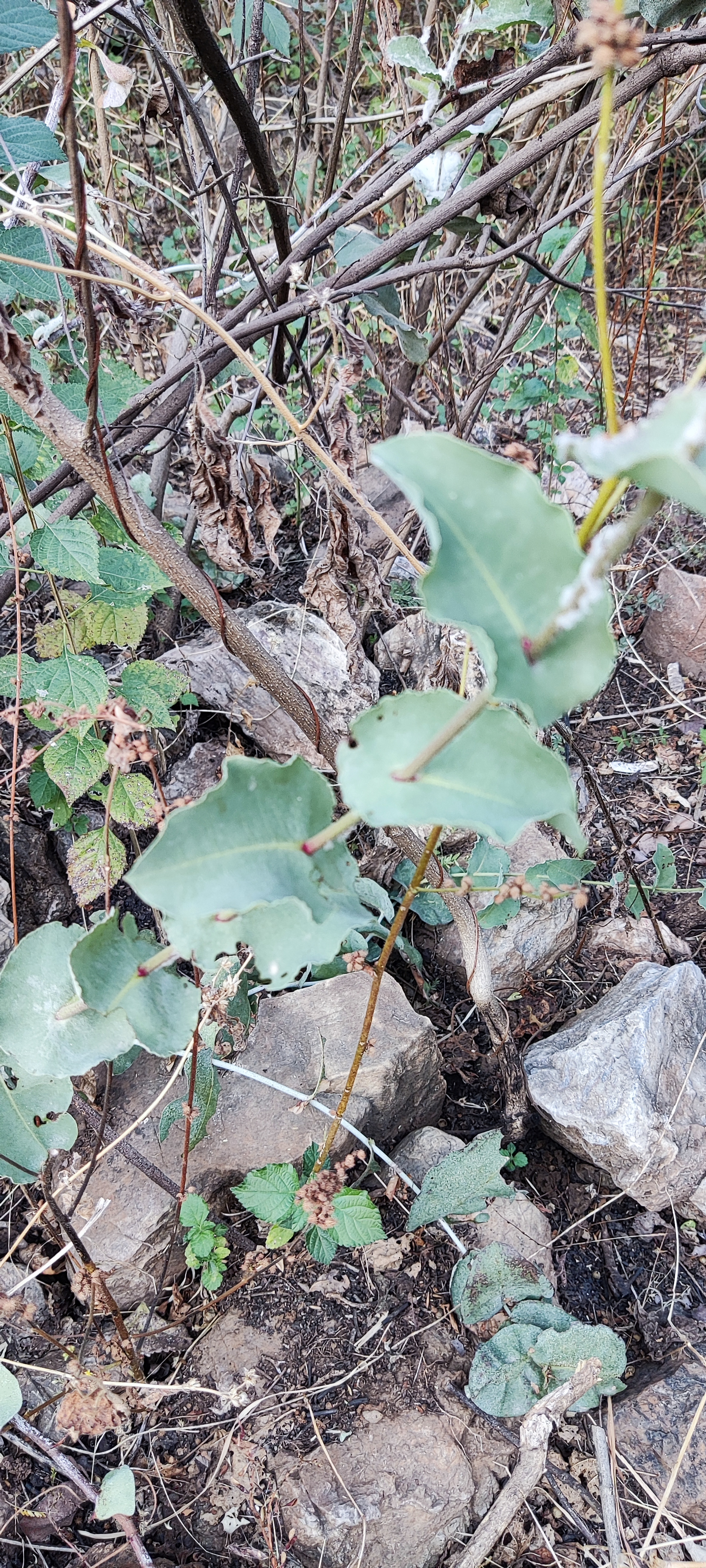
- Plumbago arabica in Udaipur, Rajasthan, India

Scientific classification
- Kingdom: Plantae
- Clade: Tracheophytes
- Clade: Angiosperms
- Clade: Eudicots
- Order: Caryophyllales
- Family: Plumbaginaceae
- Genus: Plumbago
- Species: P. arabica

Binomial name
- Plumbago arabica (Boiss.) Christenh. & Byng (2018)

Synonyms
- Dyerophytum arabicum (Boiss.) M.R.Almeida (2001); Dyerophytum indicum (Gibson ex Wight) Kuntze (1891); Plumbago dyerophyta Christenh. & Byng (2018); Vogelia arabica Boiss. (1848) (basionym); Vogelia indica Gibson ex Wight (1847); Vogelia perfoliata Stocks ex Wight (1847)

= Plumbago arabica =

Species of flowering plant

Plumbago arabica is a species of flowering plant in the genus Plumbago. It is a subshrub native to western and central India and to Oman and the United Arab Emirates in the southeastern Arabian Peninsula, where it grows in deserts and dry shrublands.

== Uses ==
The mineral coating on the Plumbago arabica was an important saline browse for livestock, especially the camels of the mountains and plains areas as well as providing a substitute for salt used during cooking.

The dried stem of the plant was also sliced into thin shavings and smoked as a tobacco, usually for medicinal reasons to treat chest conditions and breathing difficulties.

The older, tougher stems were also traditionally used in Dhofar for building bird traps, used mainly to capture partridges. The birds were attracted to the traps by the bait of scattered grain.
