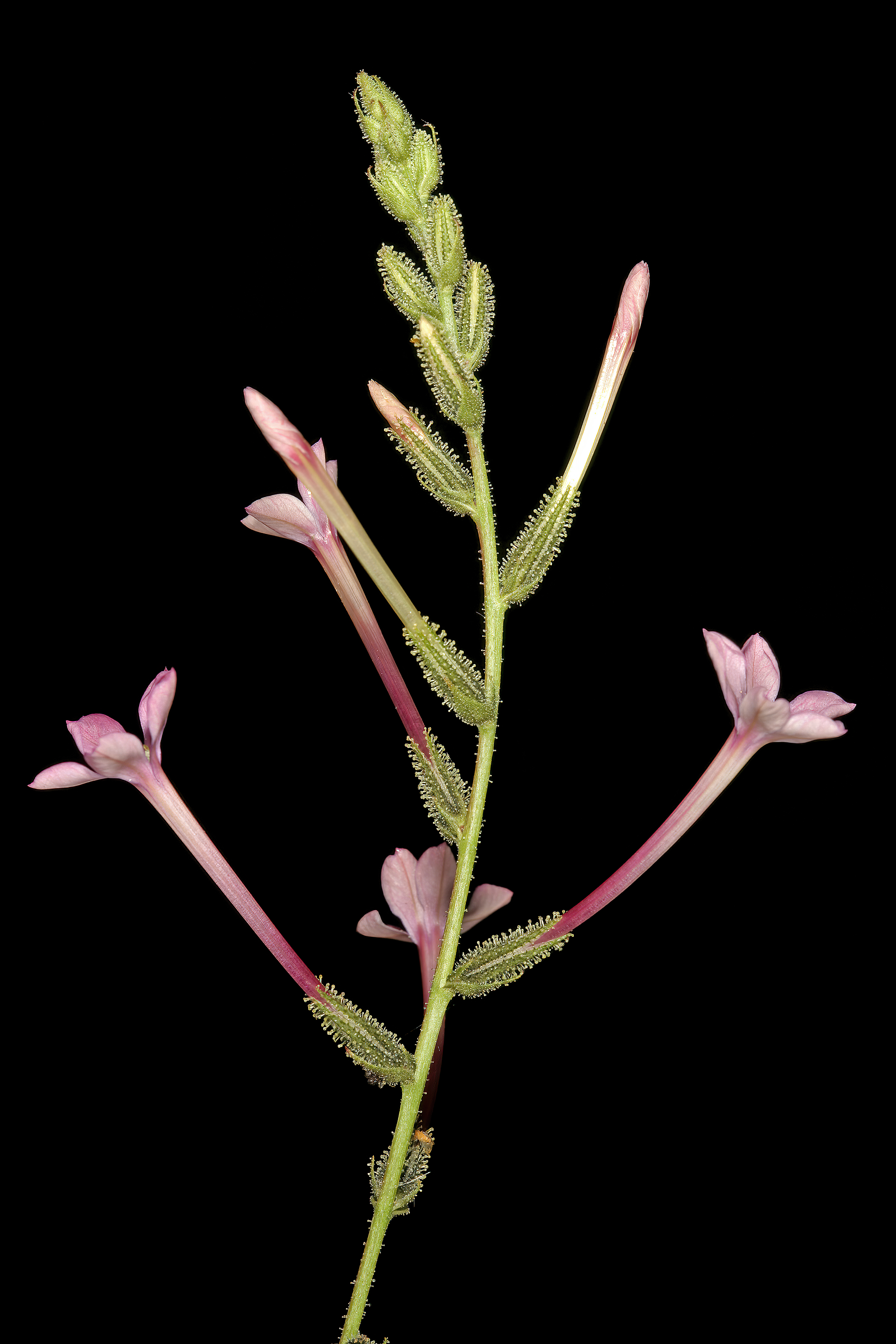

Conservation status
- Least Concern (IUCN 3.1)

Scientific classification
- Kingdom: Plantae
- Clade: Tracheophytes
- Clade: Angiosperms
- Clade: Eudicots
- Order: Caryophyllales
- Family: Plumbaginaceae
- Genus: Plumbago
- Species: P. wissii

Binomial name
- Plumbago wissii Friedrich

= Plumbago wissii =

Species of plant

Plumbago wissii is a species of plant in the family Plumbaginaceae endemic to Namibia. Its natural habitat is rocky areas. It grows to around 2mm in diameter, and 70mm in height.
