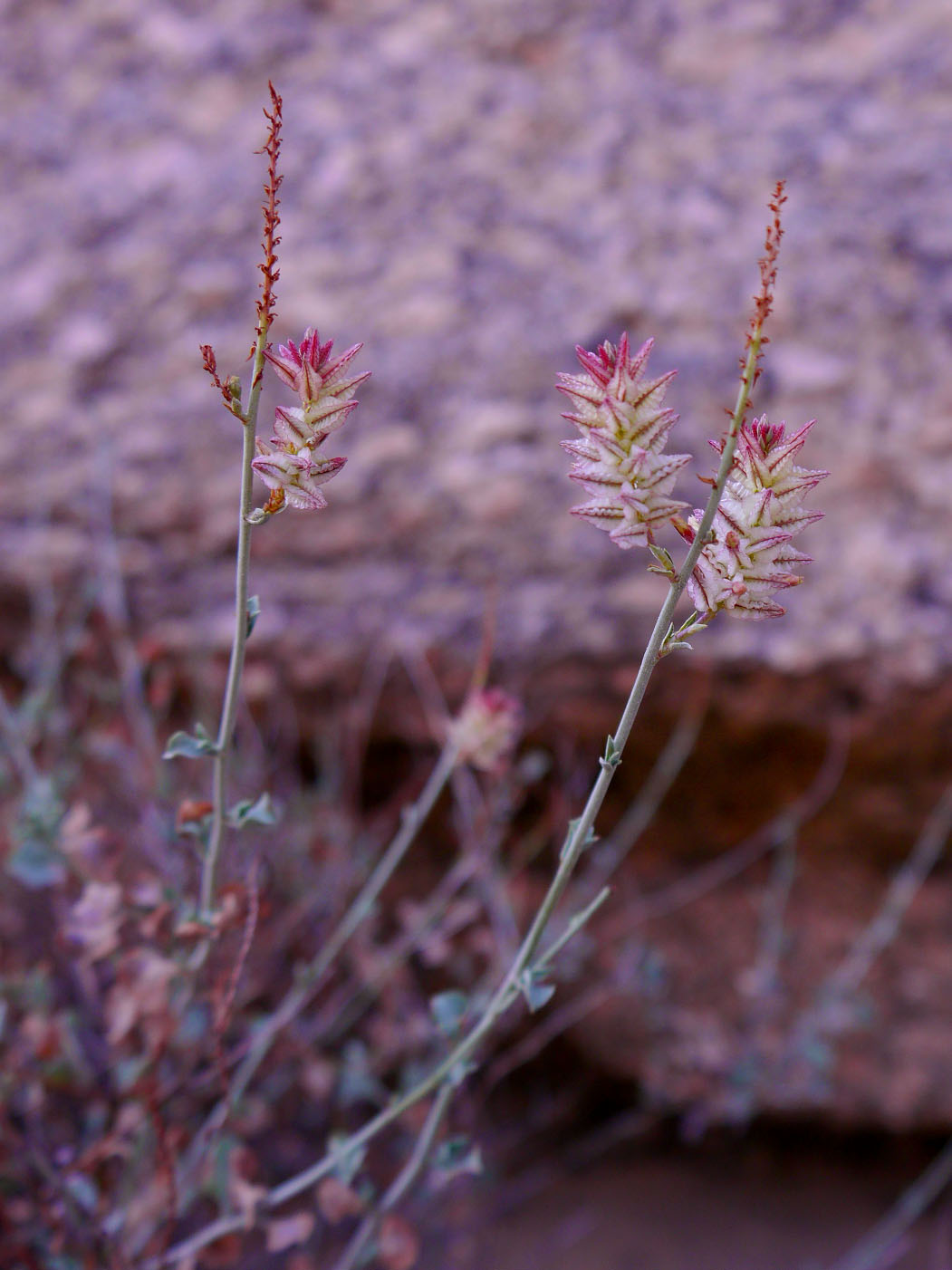

Scientific classification
- Kingdom: Plantae
- Clade: Tracheophytes
- Clade: Angiosperms
- Clade: Eudicots
- Order: Caryophyllales
- Family: Plumbaginaceae
- Genus: Plumbago
- Species: P. africana

Binomial name
- Plumbago africana (Lam.) Christenh. & Byng (2018)

Synonyms
- Dyerophytum africanum (Lam.) Kuntze (1891); Vogelia africana Lam. (1792)

= Plumbago africana =

Species of flowering plant

'Plumbago africana is a species of flowering plant in the genus Plumbago. It is a subshrub that ranges from southwestern Angola through Namibia to the northwestern Cape Provinces of South Africa, where it grows in deserts and dry shrublands.
