= Plumbago socotrana =

Conservation status
- Vulnerable (IUCN 3.1)

Scientific classification
- Kingdom: Plantae
- Clade: Tracheophytes
- Clade: Angiosperms
- Clade: Eudicots
- Order: Caryophyllales
- Family: Plumbaginaceae
- Genus: Plumbago
- Species: P. socotrana

Binomial name
- Plumbago socotrana Balf.f. ined.

Synonyms
- Dyerophytum socotranum (Gibs. ex Wight) Kutze; Dyerophytum indicum var. socotrana (Wight) Kuntze; Vogelia indica var. socotrana Balf.f. (1884)

Species of flowering plant

Plumbago socotrana (synonym Dyerophytum socotranum) is a small shrub growing up to 2m tall, rather glaucous and covered in white mealy powder. It has yellow flowers.

== Habitat ==
Plumbago socotrana is endemic to Socotra (Yemen). It lives in dry habitats on limestone cliffs, boulders and wadis from 30 to 650 meters elevation.
