= Plumbago micrantha =

Scientific classification
- Kingdom: Plantae
- Clade: Tracheophytes
- Clade: Angiosperms
- Clade: Eudicots
- Order: Caryophyllales
- Family: Plumbaginaceae
- Genus: Plumbago
- Species: P. micrantha

Binomial name
- Plumbago micrantha Ledeb.

Synonyms
- Plumbagella micrantha (Ledeb.) Spach; Plumbagella micrantha var. himalaica W.W.Sm.; Plumbago spinosa K.S.Hao

Genus of plants

Plumbago micrantha is a species of flowering plant belonging to the family Plumbaginaceae. It is an annual native to Central Asia, southern Siberia, Mongolia, Tibet, and western and northern China.

The species was described by Carl Friedrich von Ledebour in 1829.
