= Plumbago pendula =

Conservation status
- Vulnerable (IUCN 3.1)

Scientific classification
- Kingdom: Plantae
- Clade: Tracheophytes
- Clade: Angiosperms
- Clade: Eudicots
- Order: Caryophyllales
- Family: Plumbaginaceae
- Genus: Plumbago
- Species: P. pendula

Binomial name
- Plumbago pendula (Balf.f.) Christenh. & Byng (2018)

Synonyms
- Dyerophytum pendulum (Balf.f.) Kuntze (1891); Vogelia pendula Balf.f. (1883)

Species of flowering plant

Plumbago pendula is a species of flowering plant in the genus Plumbago. It is a shrub or tree endemic to north-central Socotra, an island which is part of Yemen. It grows in dry deciduous montane woodland and shrubland, often on cliffs, from 600 to 1,000 meters elevation. Trees are generally scattered and solitary, and the species has a limited range. It is assessed as vulnerable by the IUCN.
