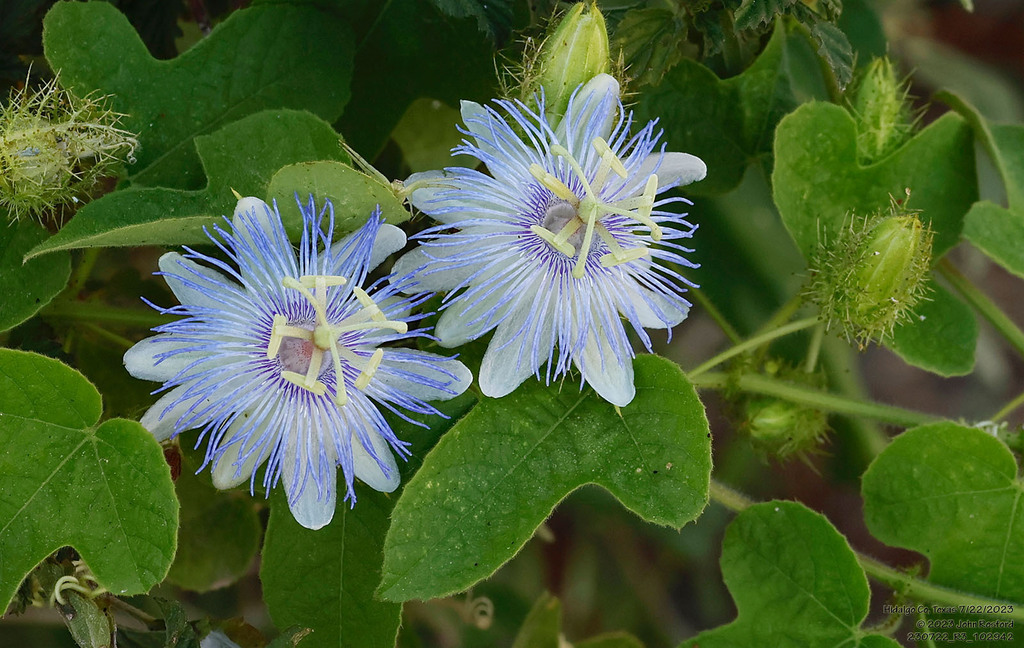
- Flowers

Scientific classification
- Kingdom: Plantae
- Clade: Tracheophytes
- Clade: Angiosperms
- Clade: Eudicots
- Clade: Rosids
- Order: Malpighiales
- Family: Passifloraceae
- Genus: Passiflora
- Species: P. foetida

Binomial name
- Passiflora foetida L.

= Passiflora foetida =

Species of carnivorous plant

Passiflora foetida (common names: stinking passionflower, wild maracuja, bush passion fruit, wild water lemon, stoneflower, love-in-a-mist, or running pop) is a species of passion flower that is native to the southwestern United States (southern Texas and Arizona), Mexico, the Caribbean, Central America, and much of South America. It has been introduced to tropical regions around the world, such as Southeast Asia, South Asia, Hawaii, Africa, and The Maldives. It is a creeping vine like other members of the genus, and yields an edible fruit. The specific epithet, foetida, means "stinking" in Latin and refers to the strong aroma emitted by damaged foliage.

This passion flower tolerates arid ground, but favours moist areas. It is known to be an invasive species in some areas. This plant is also a widely grown perennial climber, and has been used in traditional medicine.

== Description ==
The stems are thin and wiry, and are covered with minute sticky yellow hairs. Older stems become woody. The leaves are three- to five-lobed and viscid-hairy. When crushed, these leaves give off a pungent odor that some people consider unpleasant. The flowers are white to pale cream coloured, or pink to pale purple, about 5–6 cm diameter. The ripe fruit is globose, 2–3 cm diameter, remains green at maturity and has numerous black seeds embedded in the pulp; the fruit are eaten and the seeds dispersed by birds. Red-fruited plants have been classified as distinct species.

Passiflora foetida is able to trap insects on its bracts, which exude a sticky substance that also contains digestive enzymes. This minimizes predation on young flowers and fruits. Whether or not it gains nourishment from its prey is uncertain, and it is considered a protocarnivorous plant.

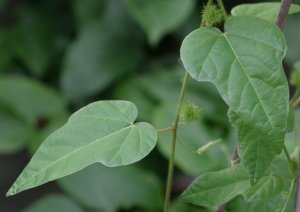
Leaves

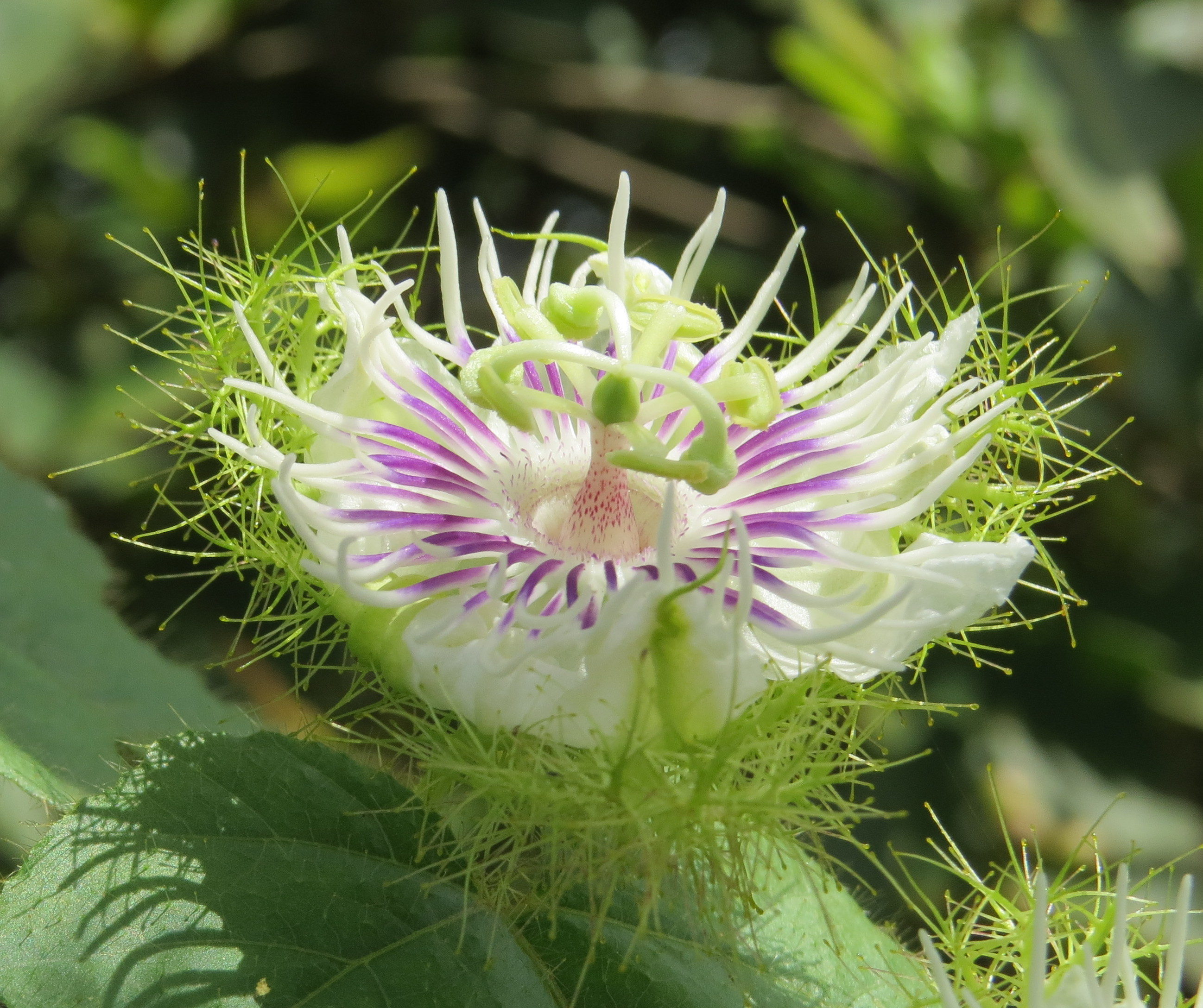
Flower close-up

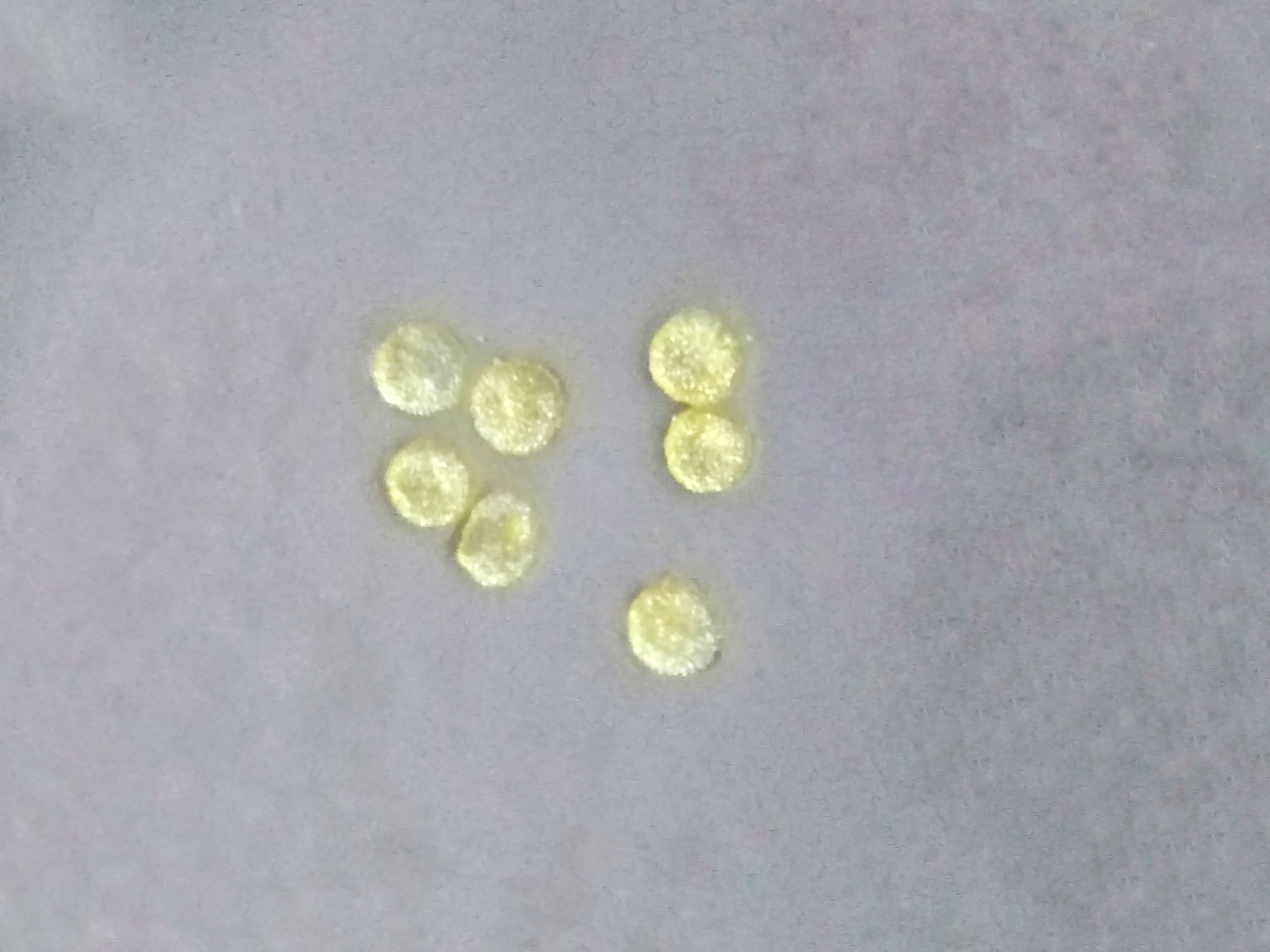
Pollen grains

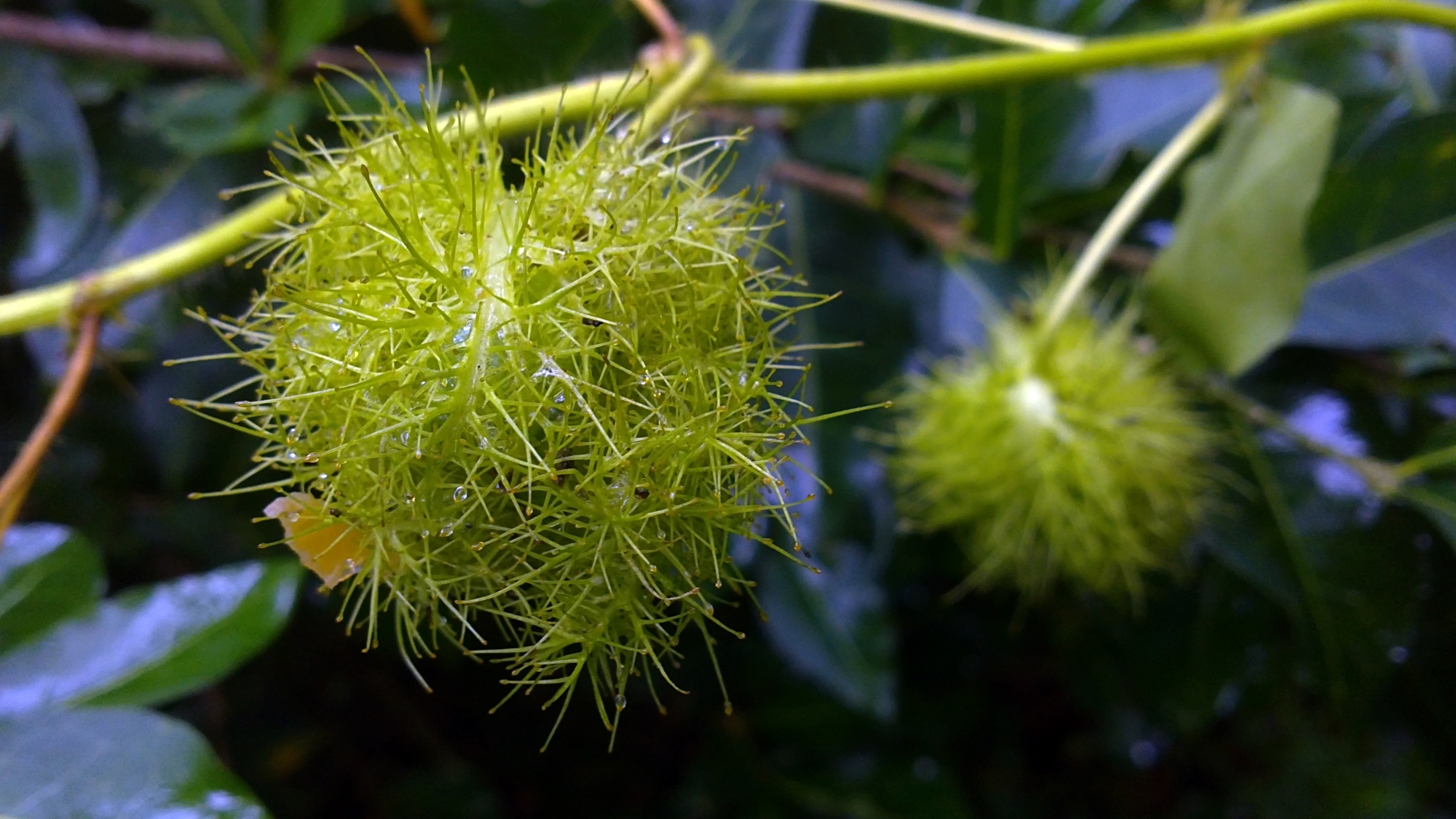
Fruits

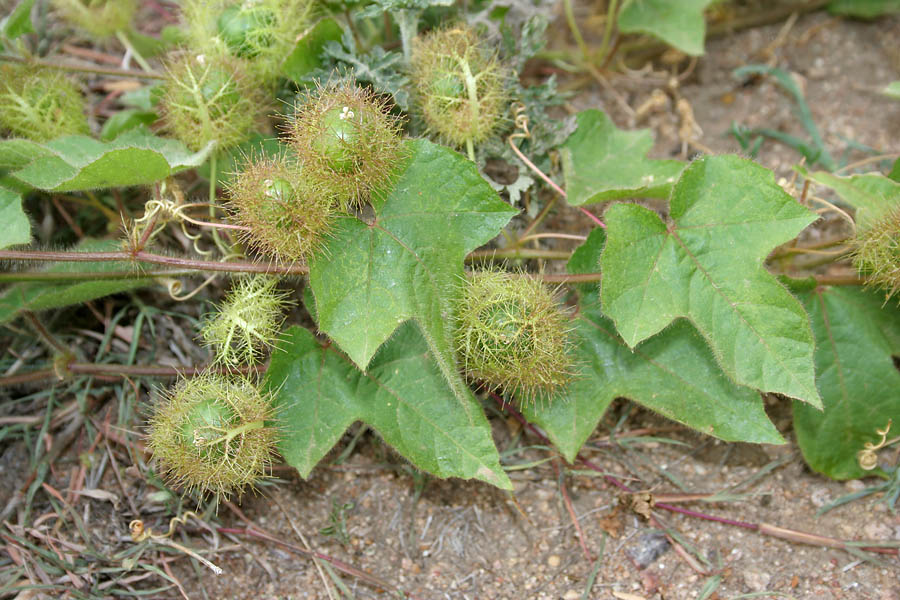
Fruiting plant

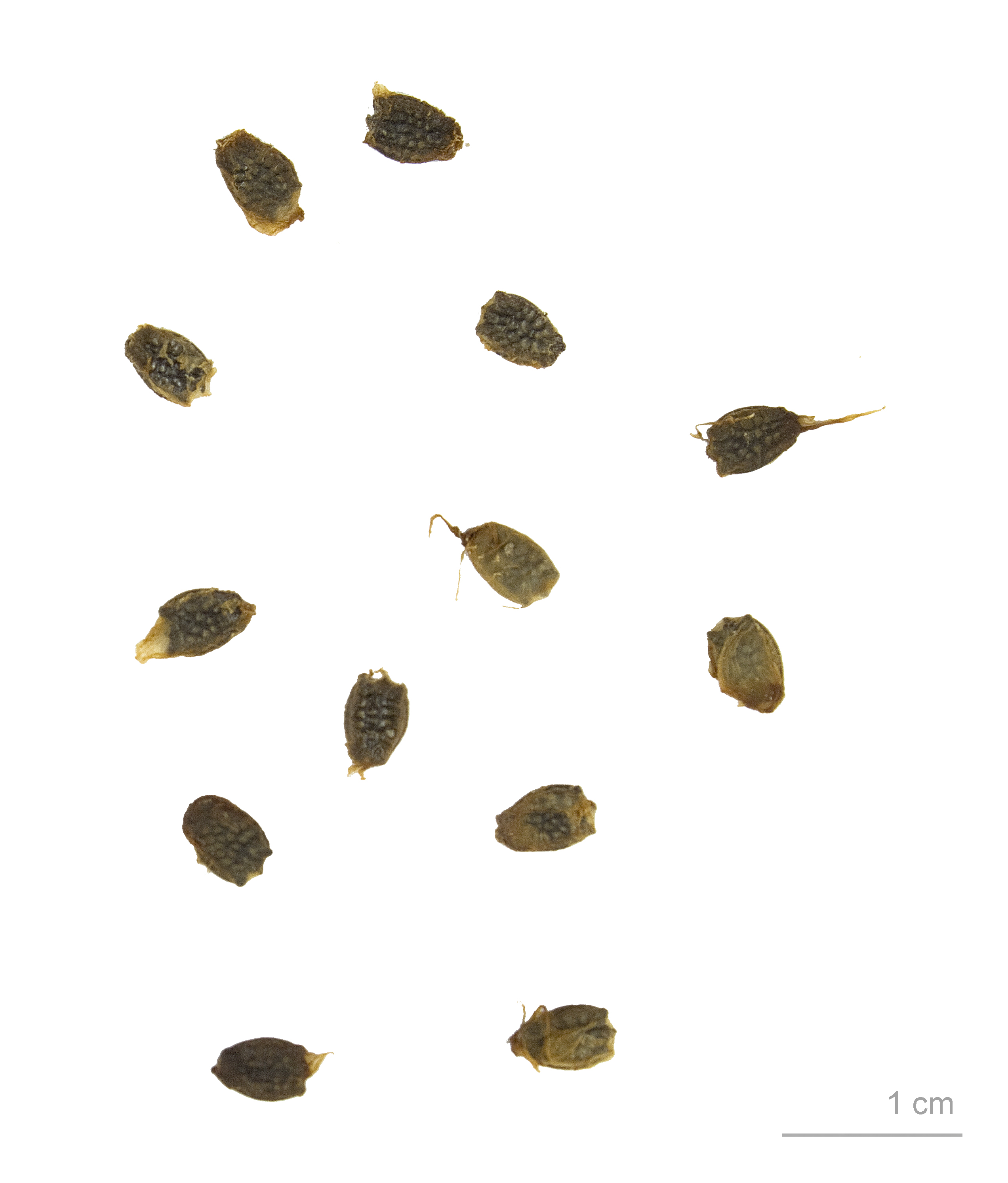
Seeds

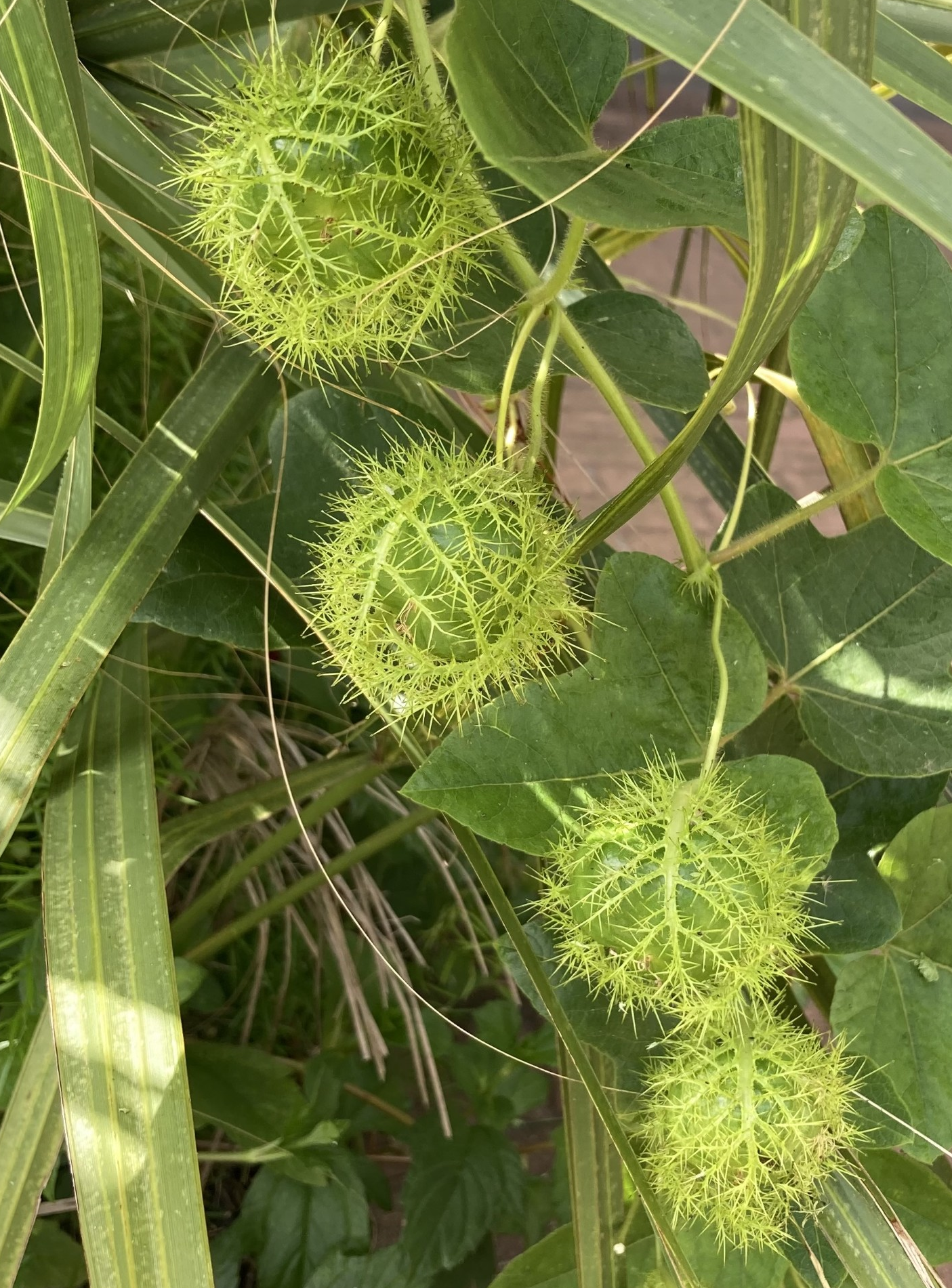
Green fruits

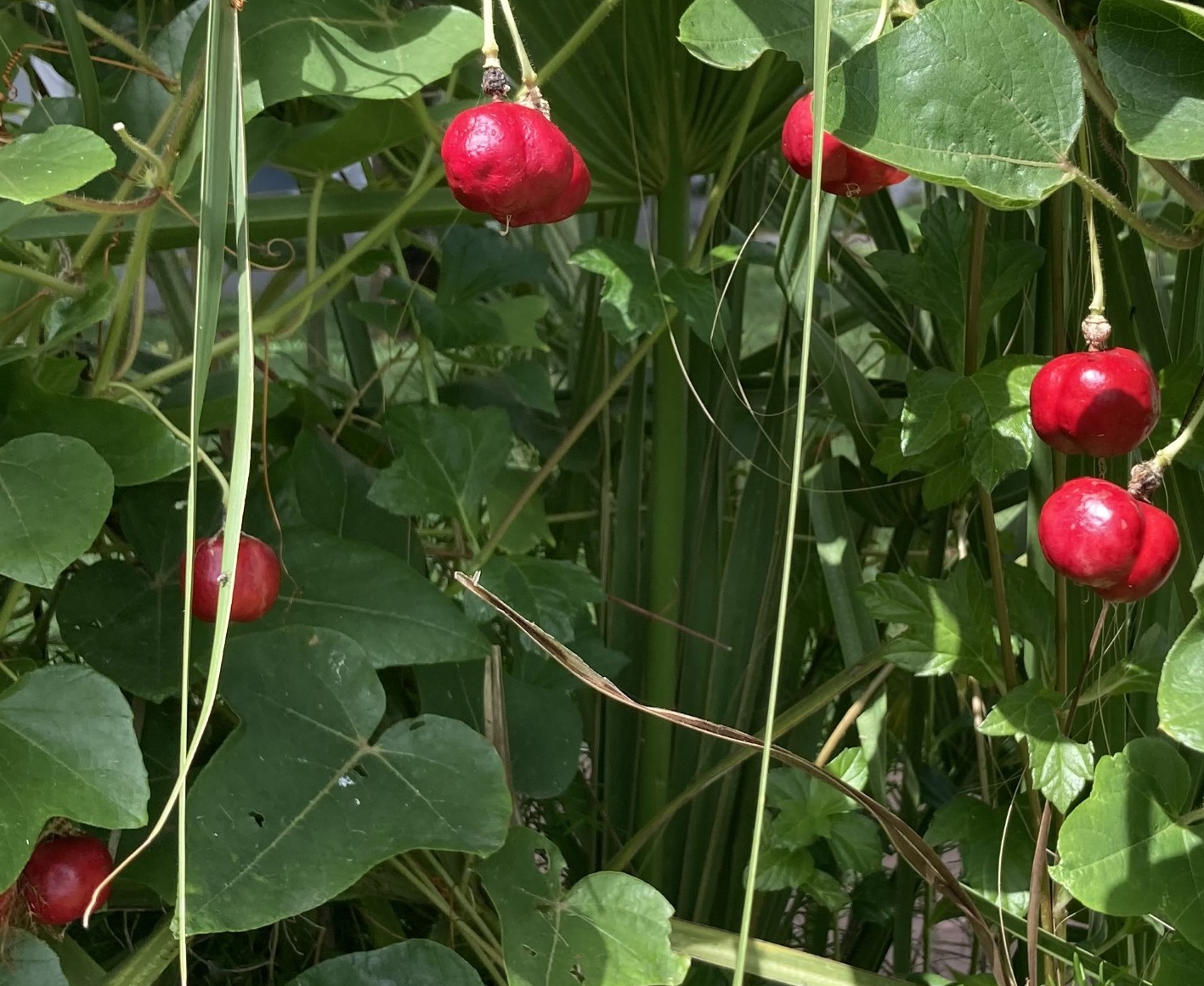
Red fruits

== Animal interactions ==
Passiflora foetida is a larval host and nectar source for the Gulf fritillary (Agraulis vanillae).

Passiflora foetida has been mentioned as a toxic plant by farmers from northeastern Brazil. An experiment done with goats led to the discovery that high levels of cyanide in P. foetida cause poisoning after the ingestion of fresh leaves, mostly during the dry season.

== Uses ==
The fruits are roughly the size of a ping pong ball or kumquat and contain a bluish-white pulp that is mildly sweet and delicately flavored. In the Philippines, the fruit of Passiflora foetida are known colloquially as marya-marya ('Little Mary'), balabalecua (in kapampangan), kurombot, utot-utot, and santo papa (due to its resemblance to the Pope's mitre). Young leaves and plant tips are also edible. Dry leaves are used in tea in Vietnamese folk medicine to relieve sleeping problems, as well as treatment for itching and coughs.
