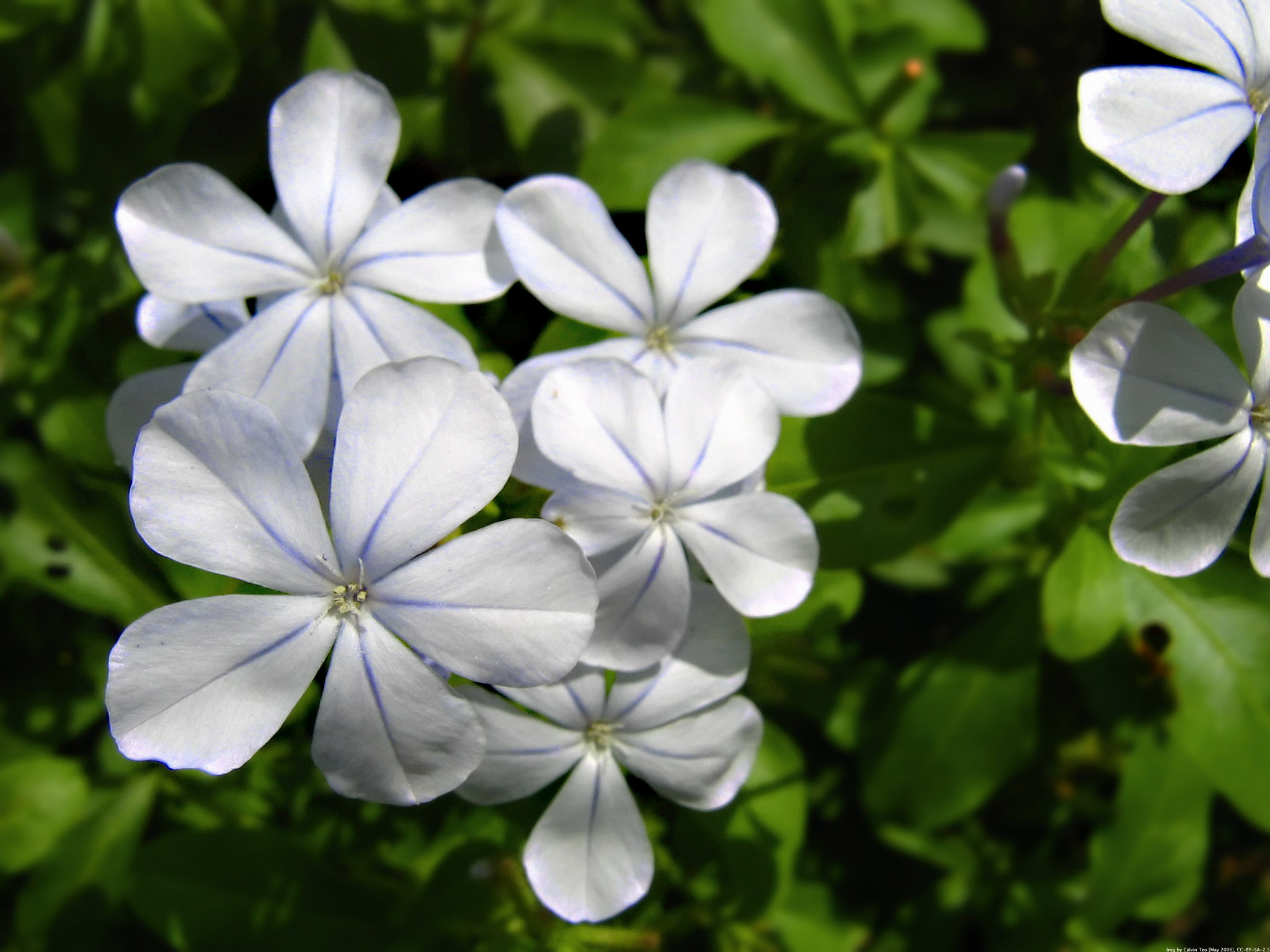
- Plumbago auriculata

Scientific classification
- Kingdom: Plantae
- Clade: Tracheophytes
- Clade: Angiosperms
- Clade: Eudicots
- Order: Caryophyllales
- Family: Plumbaginaceae
- Genus: Plumbago; Tourn. ex L. (1753)

Type species
- Plumbago europaea L.

Species
- 23; see text

Synonyms
- Dyerophytum Kuntze (1891); Findlaya Bowdich (1825); Molubda Raf. (1838); Plumbagella Spach (1841); Plumbagidium Spach (1841); Thela Lour. (1790); Vogelia Lam. (1792), nom. illeg.

= Plumbago =

Genus of carnivorous plants

Plumbago is a genus of 24 species of flowering plants in the family Plumbaginaceae, native to warm temperate to tropical regions of the world. Common names include plumbago and leadwort (names which are also shared by the genus Ceratostigma).

== Description ==
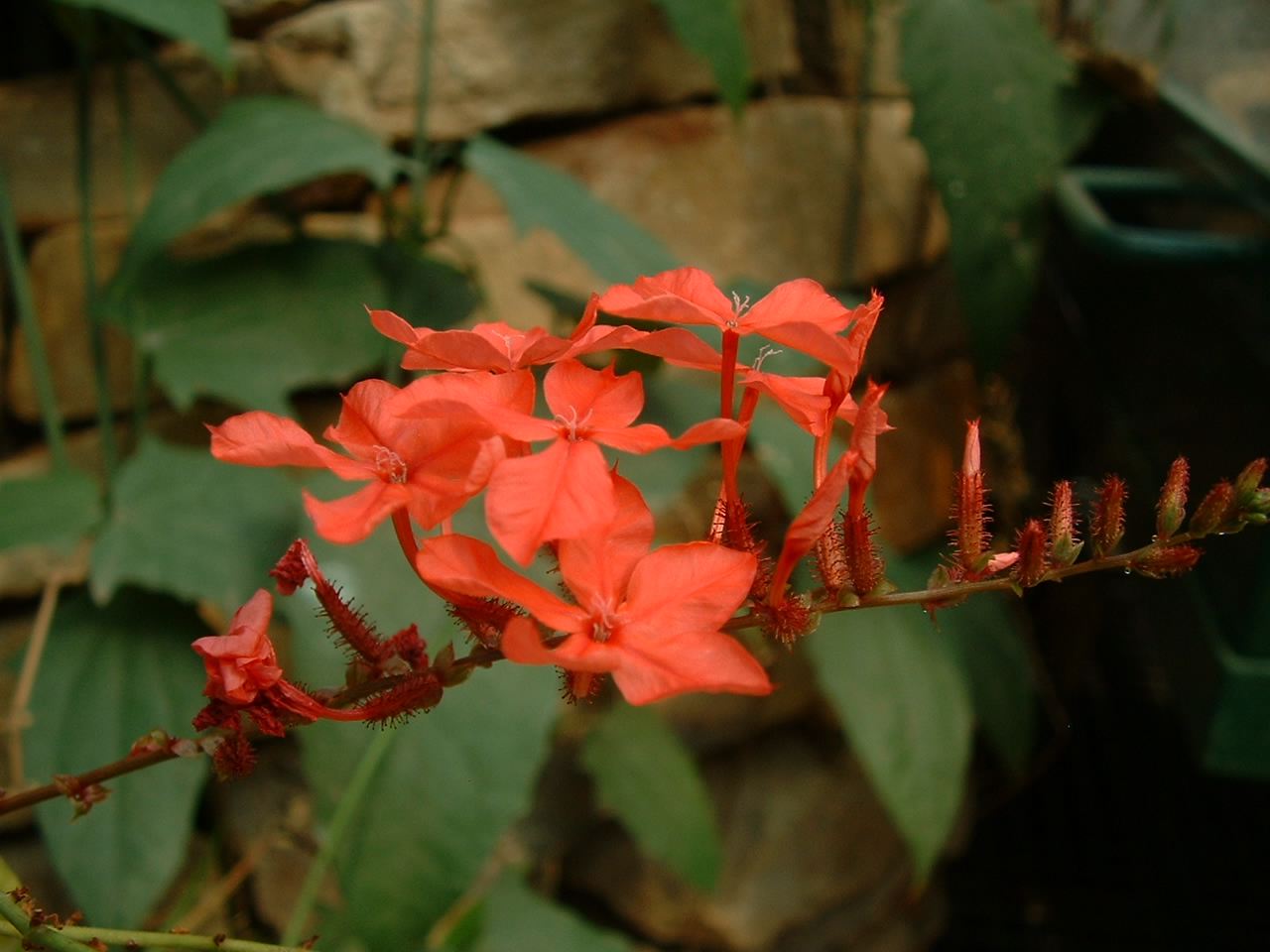
Plumbago indica

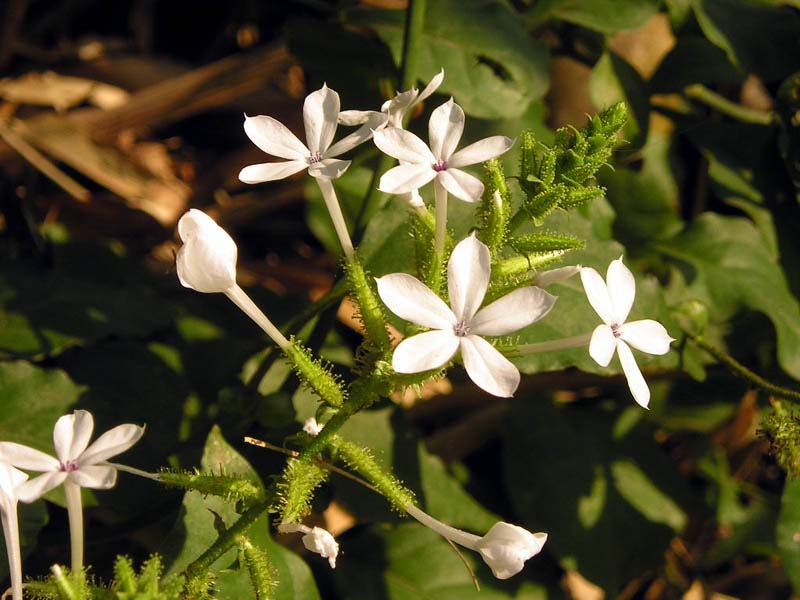
Plumbago zeylanica

The species include herbaceous plants and shrubs growing to 0.5–2 m (1.6–6.6 ft) tall. The leaves are spirally arranged, simple, entire, 0.5–12 cm (0.20–4.72 in) long, with a tapered base and often with a hairy margin. The flowers are white, blue, purple, red, or pink, with a tubular corolla with five petal-like lobes; they are produced in racemes.

The flower calyx has glandular trichomes (hairs), which secrete a sticky mucilage that is capable of trapping and killing insects; it is unclear what the purpose of these trichomes is; protection from pollination by way of "crawlers" (ants and other insects that typically do not transfer pollen between individual plants), or possible protocarnivory.

Mature plumbago leaves often have a whitish residue on their undersides, a feature that can confuse gardeners. While this white material resembles a powdery mildew disease or a chemical spray deposit, it is actually a natural exudate from "chalk" glands that are found on the Plumbago species.

== Nomenclature ==
The generic name is from the Latin plant name plumbāgō, 'leadwort' (also 'graphite' or 'lead-color'), derived from the word plumbum, 'lead', was first used by Pliny the Elder (23–79) for a plant known as μολύβδαινα (molybdaina) to Pedanius Dioscorides (ca. 40–90). This may have referred to its lead-blue flower colour, the ability of the sap to create lead-colored stains on skin, or Pliny's belief that the plant was a cure for lead poisoning.

== Species ==
Plants of the World Online accepts 24 species.

Image	Name	Distribution
	Plumbago africana (Lam.) Christenh. & Byng}	Southwestern Angola, Namibia, and the Cape Provinces of South Africa
	Plumbago amplexicaulis Oliv.	Democratic Republic of the Congo, Tanzania, Zambia, and Mozambique
	Plumbago aphylla Bojer ex Boiss.	Madagascar, Tanzania (Mbudya Island), Aldabra, Europa Island
	Plumbago arabica (Boiss.) Christenh. & Byng}	Eastern Arabian Peninsula and western and central India
	Plumbago auriculata Lam.	Mozambique and South Africa
	Plumbago caerulea Kunth	Northwestern Venezuela, Colombia, Peru, Bolivia, northern and central Chile, and northern Argentina
	Plumbago ciliata Engl. ex Wilmot-Dear	Southern Tanzania
	Plumbago dawei Rolfe	Southwestern Ethiopia, Kenya, Uganda, Tanzania, and Madagascar
	Plumbago europaea L.	Mediterranean to Iraq, Iran, Caucasus, and Turkmenistan
	Plumbago glandulicaulis Wilmot-Dear	Northern Tanzania
	Plumbago hunsbergensis van Jaarsv., Swanepoel & A.E.van Wyk}	Namibia
	Plumbago indica L.	Indian subcontinent, Indochina, south-central China, Hainan, Philippines, Sumatra, Java, and Sulawesi
	Plumbago ituriensis Ntore}	Democratic Republic of the Congo
	Plumbago madagascariensis M. Peltier	Madagascar
	Plumbago micrantha Ledeb.	Central Asia to Tibet, northern China, Mongolia, and eastern Siberia
	Plumbago montis-elgonis Bullock	Southwestern Ethiopia, Kenya, and northwestern Tanzania
	Plumbago pearsonii L. Bolus	Namibia (Naukluft Mountains)
	Plumbago pendula (Balf.f.) Christenh. & Byng	North-central Socotra
	Plumbago pulchella Boiss.	Mexico
	Plumbago socotrana (Balf.f.) ined.	Socotra
	Plumbago stenophylla Wilmot-Dear	Southeastern Kenya
	Plumbago tristis Aiton	Southwestern Cape Provinces (South Africa)
	Plumbago wissii Friedr.	Namibia (Brandberg)
	Plumbago zeylanica L.	Tropical and subtropical regions of the Americas, sub-Saharan Africa, Madagascar, Indian subcontinent, Indochina, southern China, Malesia, New Guinea, and northern and eastern Australia

== See also ==
- Plumbagin
