= Plumbago caerulea =

Scientific classification
- Kingdom: Plantae
- Clade: Tracheophytes
- Clade: Angiosperms
- Clade: Eudicots
- Order: Caryophyllales
- Family: Plumbaginaceae
- Genus: Plumbago
- Species: P. caerulea

Binomial name
- Plumbago caerulea Kunth, 1818

Species of flowering plant

Plumbago caerulea is a species of flowering plant in the family Plumbaginaceae. It is native to South America.
