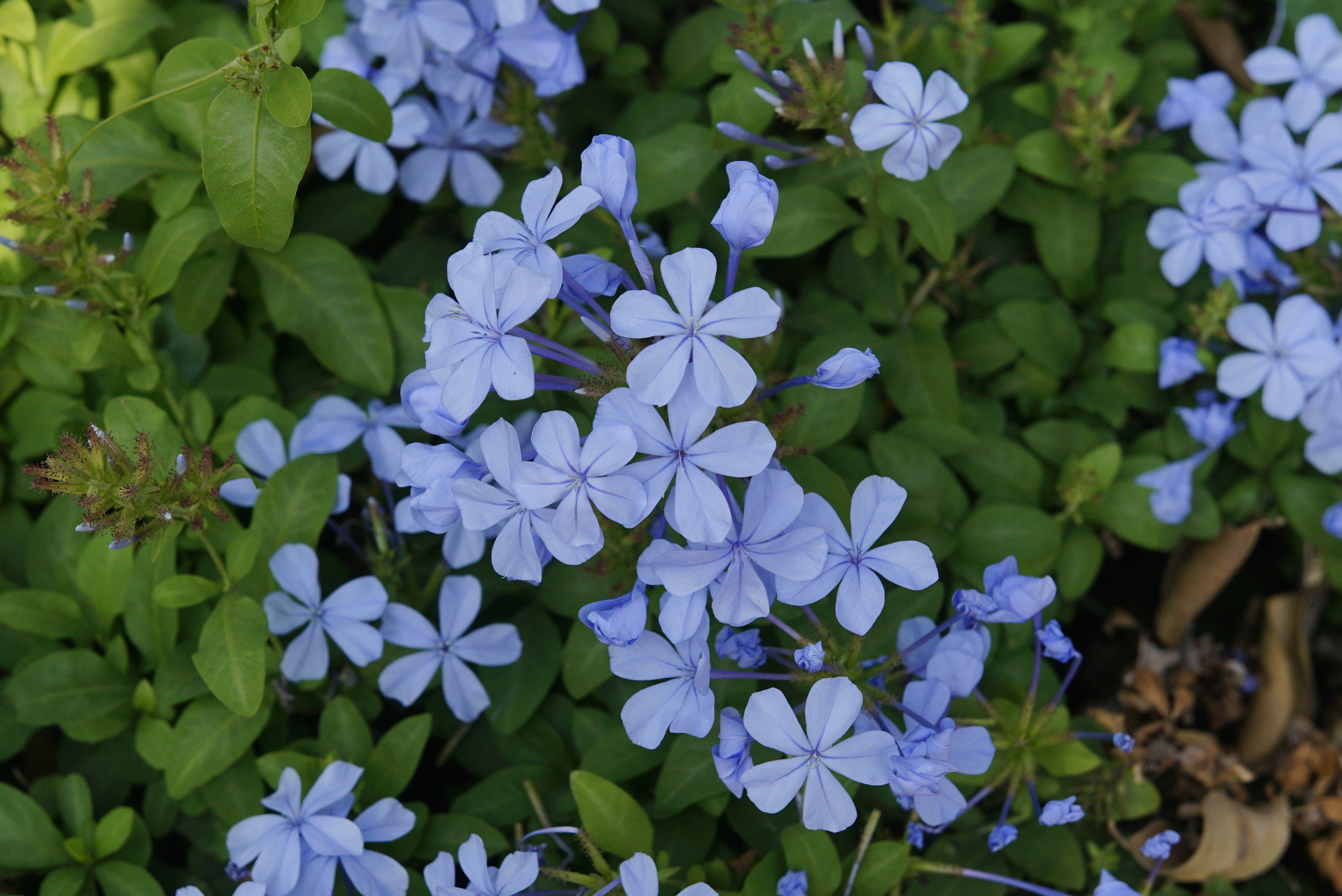

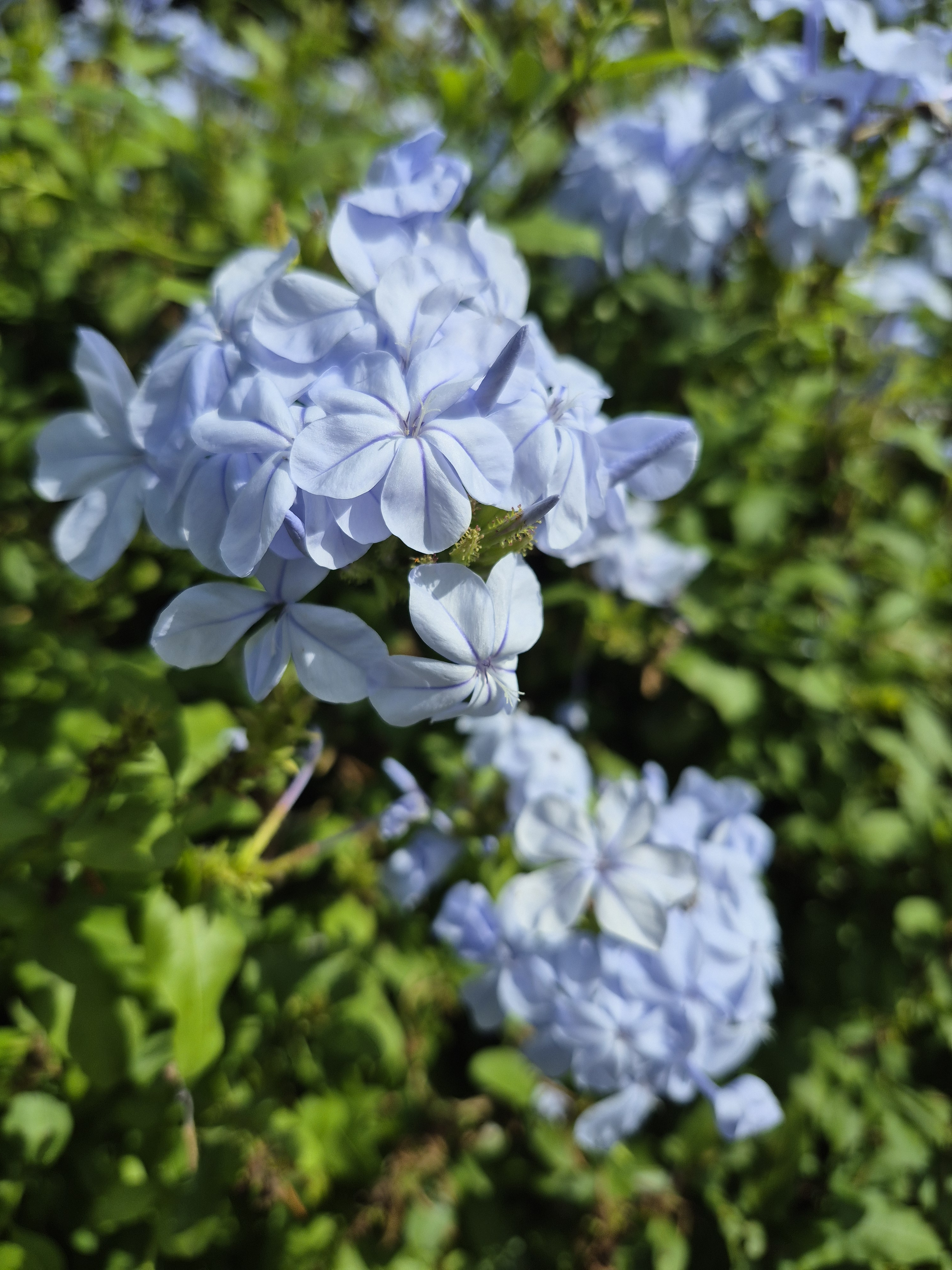
- Cultivated in Brazil

Scientific classification
- Kingdom: Plantae
- Clade: Tracheophytes
- Clade: Angiosperms
- Clade: Eudicots
- Order: Caryophyllales
- Family: Plumbaginaceae
- Genus: Plumbago
- Species: P. auriculata

Binomial name
- Plumbago auriculata Lam.

Synonyms
- Plumbagidium auriculatum (Lam.) Spach; Plumbago capensis Thunb.; Plumbago capensis Willd.

= Plumbago auriculata =

Species of carnivorous plant

Plumbago auriculata, the Cape leadwort, blue plumbago or Cape plumbago, is a species of flowering plant in the family Plumbaginaceae, native to South Africa and Mozambique.

The specific epithet auriculata means "with ears", referring to the shape of the leaves., leaf venation - reticulate.

== Description ==
Plumbago auriculata is an evergreen shrub, often grown as a climber, ascending rapidly to 6 m (20 ft) tall by 3 m (10 ft) wide in nature, though much smaller when cultivated as a houseplant. The leaves are a glossy green and grow to 5 cm (2 in) long. The stems are long, thin, and climbing. The leaves alternate and are 2–5 cm.

=== Inflorescences ===
The corolla with five petal-like lobes is about 2 cm wide and can be pale blue, blue or violet in color. There also variations with white (P. auriculata var. alba) or deep blue (P. auriculata 'Royal Cape') flowers. The flowers are complete and bisexual, and are arranged in corymb-like racemes.

The sepals and petals are connate while the pistil is adnate. The ovary of the flower is superior and the flower has regular symmetry. It has basal placentation, with 1 locule and 5 carpels. It flowers mostly in the summer, but in the right conditions it can bloom year-round.

== Distribution ==
Native to South Africa, it extends from the Southern Cape region to Eastern Cape and KwaZulu-Natal. It can also be found in Gauteng and the adjoining areas of Free State and the North West Province. There is also an isolated occurrence in Mpumalanga. Typically the species grows in bushes or thickets. As an ornamental plant, it is widespread today in the tropics and subtropics (including the Mediterranean region).

== Biology ==
It is visited by various butterflies. Their leaves serve as food for the caterpillar of the hummingbird hawk-moth. Conversely, the sticky sepals sometimes catch animals up to the size of a housefly. It is believed that the Plumbago species living today are very similar to the first ancestors of Drosera and other carnivorous plants.

== Phytochemistry ==
Many secondary metabolites have been discovered and isolated from Plumbago auriculata such as plumbagin and palmitic acids.

== Cultivation ==
In temperate regions, it may be grown outside in frost free areas, otherwise under glass. It grows best in full sun to part shade.

The species and the white-flowered form P. auriculata f. alba have both gained the Royal Horticultural Society's Award of Garden Merit.

Plumbago auriculata can be propagated sexually by seeds and asexually by cutting in summer. It needs well-aerated soil and light and prefers acidic soil.

== Gallery ==
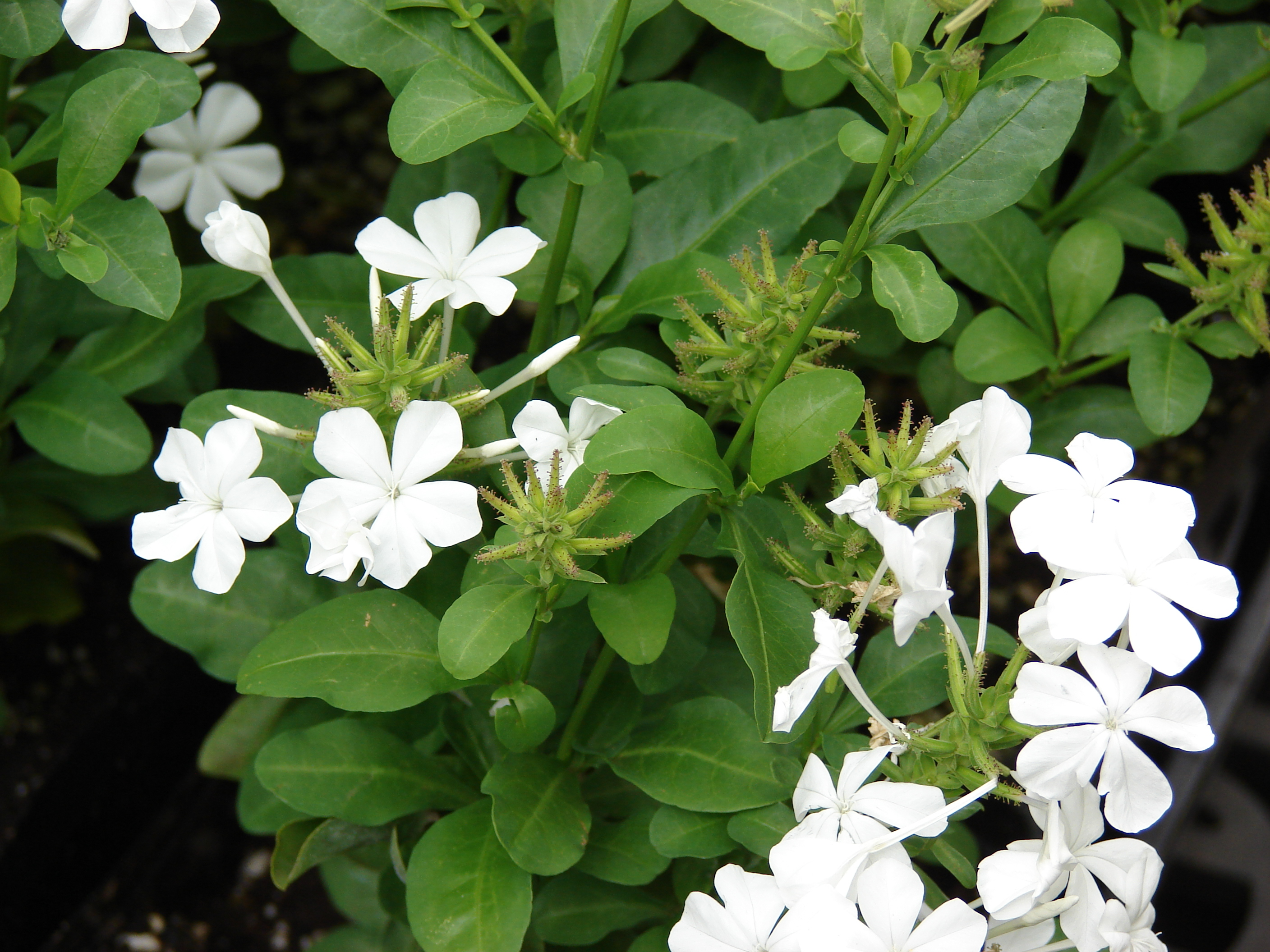
With white flowers

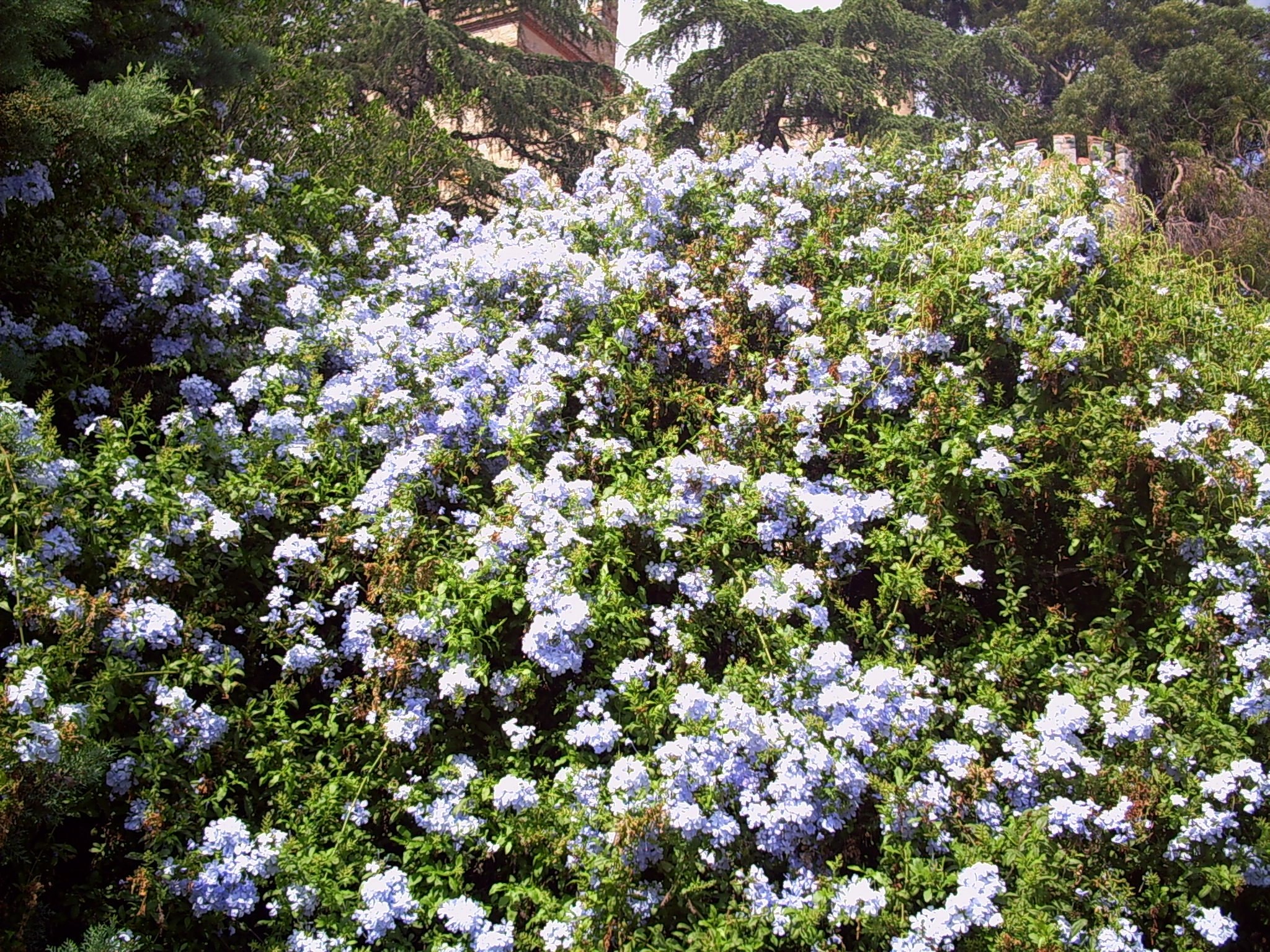
Shrub in Catalonia

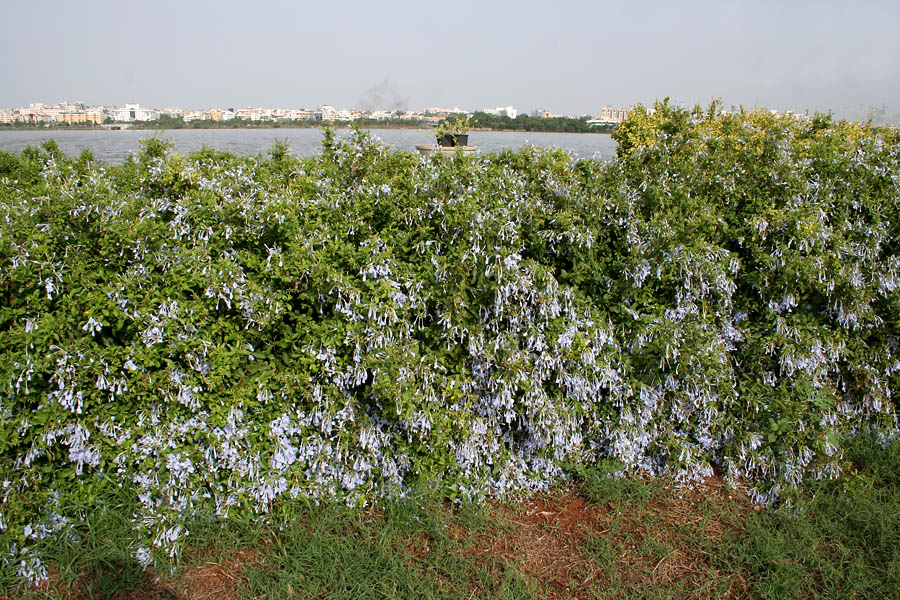
Flowering shrub growing along riverfront in Hyderabad

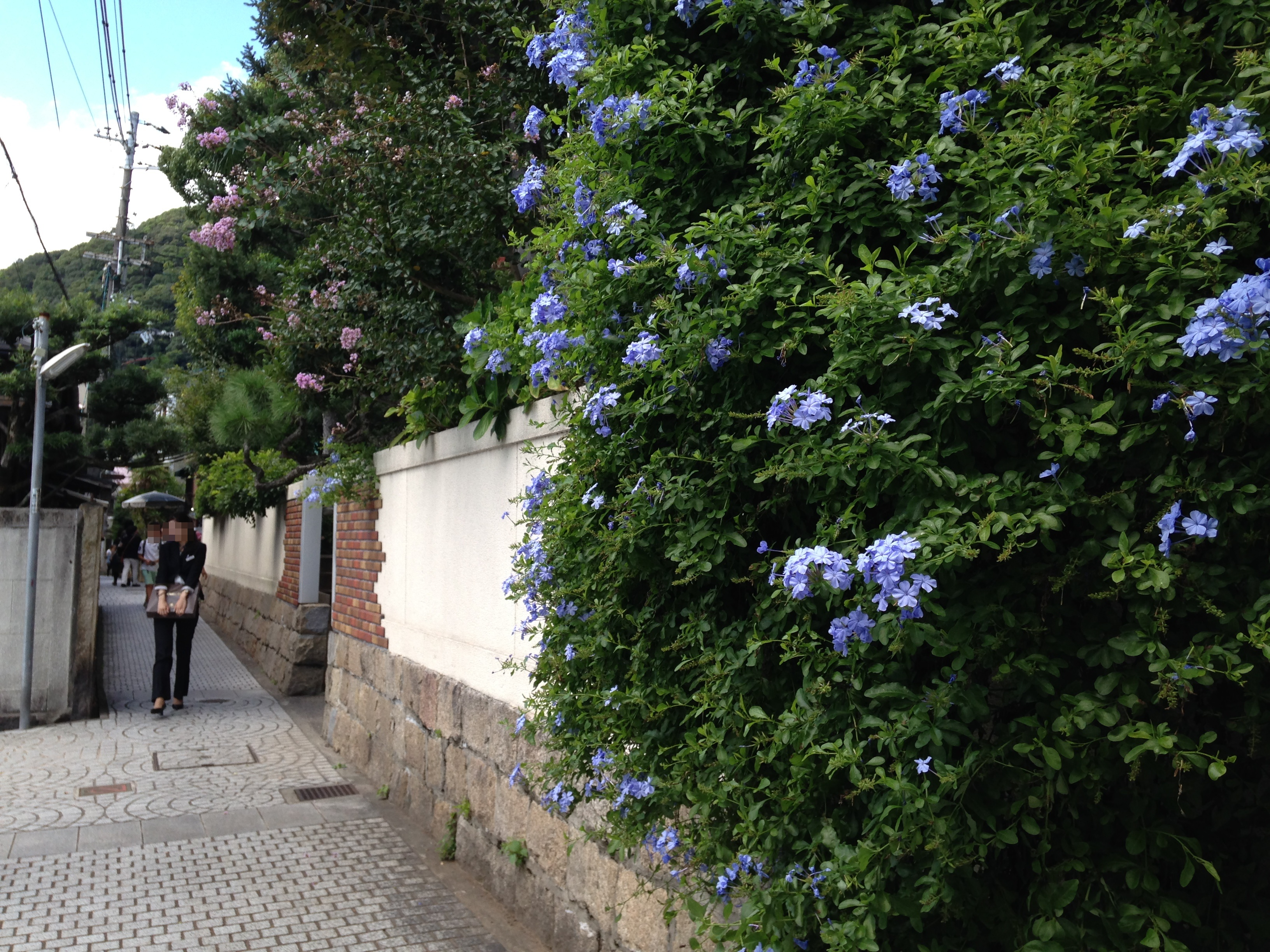
Growing on a fence in Kobe

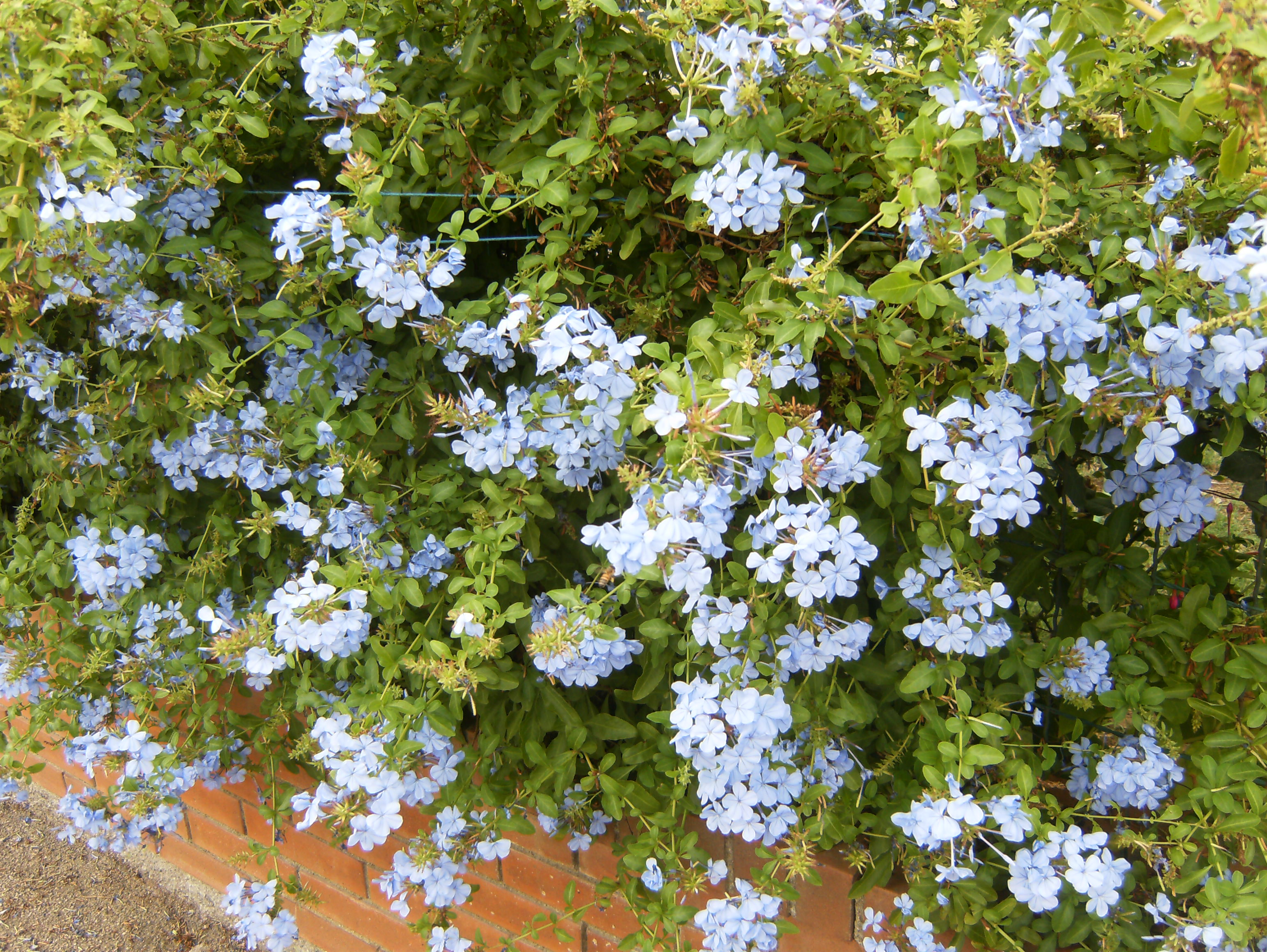
Flowering shrub in Tuscany

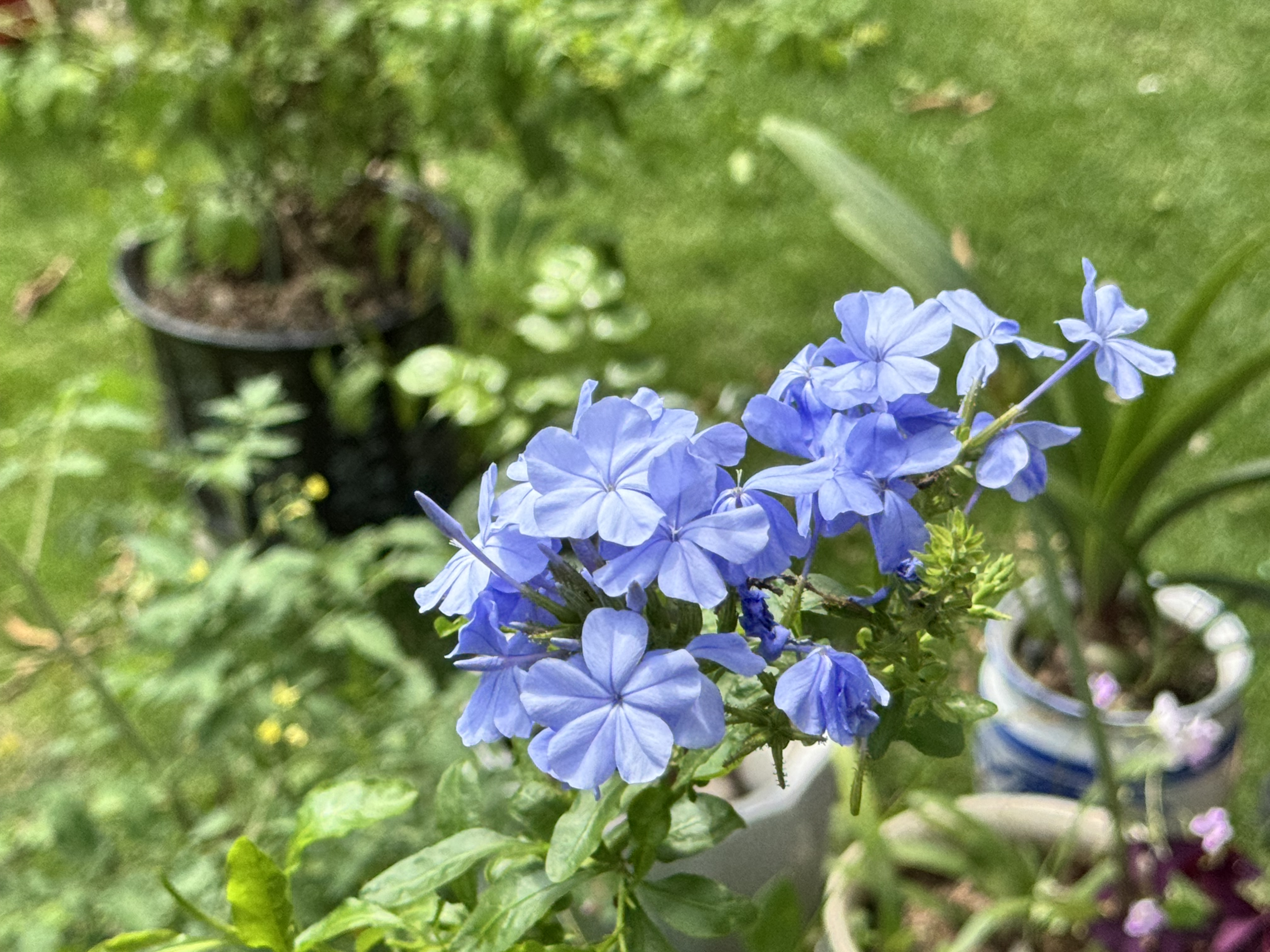
Planted in Zhuhai
