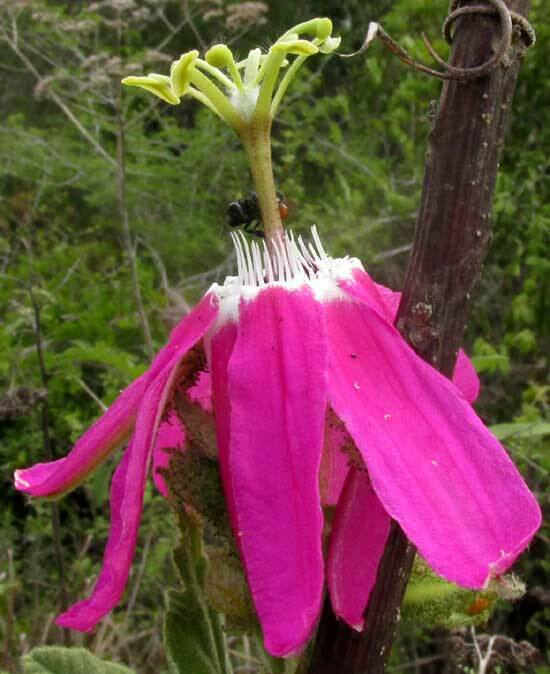
- Passiflora sublanceolata flower side view

Scientific classification
- Kingdom: Plantae
- Clade: Tracheophytes
- Clade: Angiosperms
- Clade: Eudicots
- Clade: Rosids
- Order: Malpighiales
- Family: Passifloraceae
- Subfamily: Passifloroideae
- Tribe: Passifloreae
- Genus: Passiflora
- Species: P. sublanceolata

Binomial name
- Passiflora sublanceolata (Killip) J.M.MacDougal, 2004

Synonyms
- Passiflora palmeri var. sublanceolata Killip (1936)

= Passiflora sublanceolata =

Genus of flowering plants

Passiflora sublanceolata is a species of the genus Passiflora, whose members often are known generally as passion flowers or passion vines. It belongs to the Passionflower family, the Passifloraceae.

== Description ==
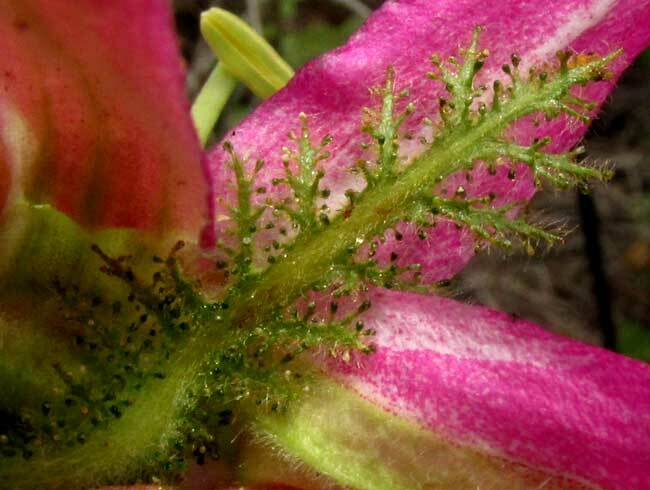
Passiflora sublanceolata much dissected, glandular bracts below flower

Passiflora sublanceolata is a tendril-bearing vine able to climb at least 3.6 m (12 ft) high in gardens. Leaves are up to 3 cm (1.2 in) long and 35 cm (14 in) wide, usually with modestly developed lobes at the base. Bracts immediately below the flowers are up to 10 mm (0.39 in) wide, and deeply 2-4 divided, with the ultimate segments threadlike and tipped with sticky glands.

Flowers are variously described as intense rose, bright purple-pink, or hot pink. The flowers' male and female parts, the stamens and pistils, are held above the petals on a special stalk, the androgynophore, up to 21 mm (0.83 in) high. The corona, consisting of slender, erect filaments surrounding the base of the androgynophore, is white, sometimes with pink or purple, and up to 10 mm (0.39 in) high. The spherical fruit is about 3 cm (1.2 in) in diameter and densely hairy.

== Distribution ==
Passiflora sublanceolata occurs in Mexico's Yucatan Peninsula, Belize and Guatemala.

== Habitat ==
In hot, subhumid areas with summer rains, Passiflora sublanceolata inhabits savannas, low-growing semi-deciduous forests which sometimes are inundated or not, and disturbed areas. Images on this page show an individual entangled with tall, dense weeds along a road in southern Mexico.

== Ecology ==
Passiflora sublanceolata is pollinated by hummingbirds.

== In gardens ==
Passiflora sublanceolata is easy to propagate from seeds, and the plants grow fast. It doesn't do well at temperatures lower than around 12 °C. (54 °F), but is suited for growing in pots or greenhouses.

== Taxonomy ==
In 1936 when Ellsworth Paine Killip first described Passiflora sublanceolata as Passiflora palmeri var. sublanceolata, it made sense because the supposed variety was very similar to the Passiflora sublanceolata. However, in 1991, John M. MacDougal determined that P. palmeri occurred in the desert of Baja California in northwestern Mexico, while his new P. sublanceolata inhabited the wetter though seasonally dry Yucatan Peninsula and Belize.

Historically, Passiflora species have been assigned to several subgenera. In 2021, phylogenetic analysis found that taxa in the traditional Passiflora section Decaloba, to which our species presumably belongs, can be recognized as belonging to the "Central American clade." However, with many of the approximately 600 Passiflora species still to be analyzed, many features of relationships of taxa at the subgenus level remain unclear.

== Etymology ==
In the genus name Passiflora, the -Passi derives from the New Latin passio, meaning "passion or suffering". This alludes to the floral morphology – the pistil's three styles representing nails, the corona representing the crown of thorns, and red coloration (if present) representing the blood of Christ – symbolizing Christ's crucifixion. The flora comes from the Latin flos, meaning "flower".

In the species name sublanceolata, the Sub- originally is from the ancient Greek sub, meaning "below or lower", and the -lanceolata is lanceolatus, which is Latin for a small lance; therefore, with this species, sublanceolata must refer to the leaf shape, which in technical botany is referred to as "sublanceolate".

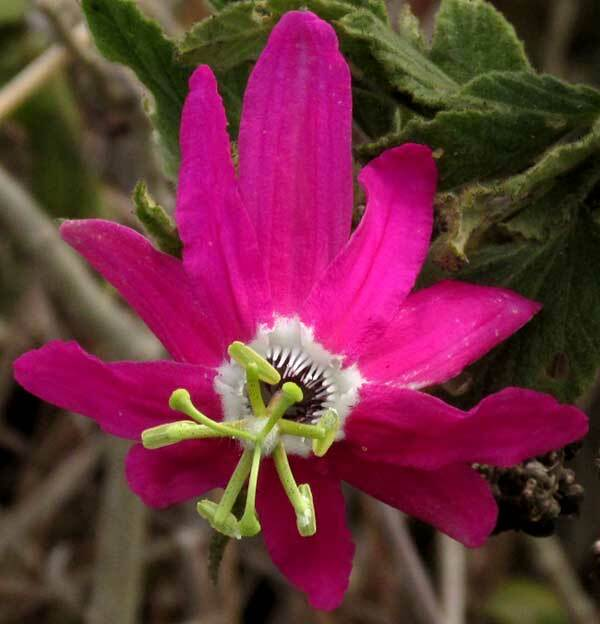
Passiflora sublanceolata, flower from above

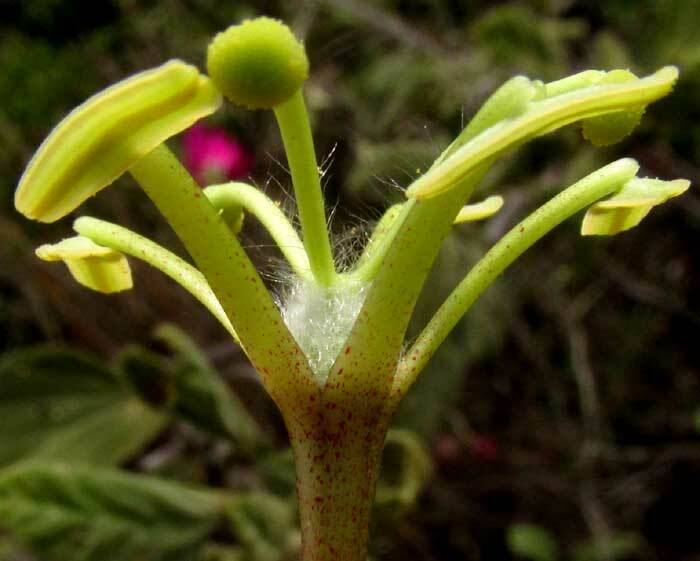
Passiflora sublanceolata, 5 stamens, 3 styles and a very hairy ovary atop the androgynophore

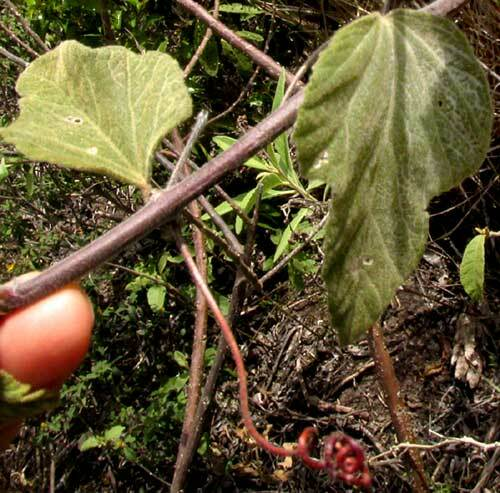
Passiflora sublanceolata, sublanceolate leaves and tendrils

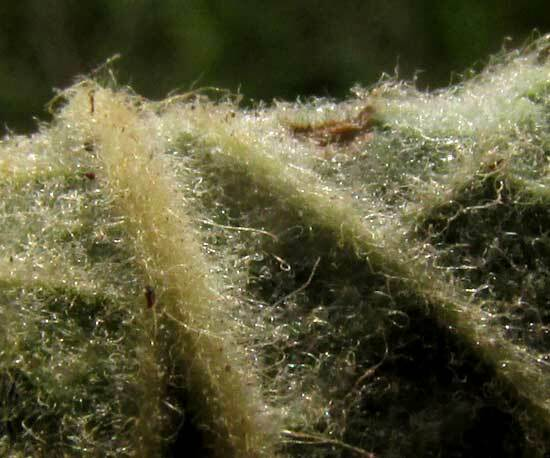
Passiflora sublanceolata, hairy, sticky-glandular leaf undersurface
