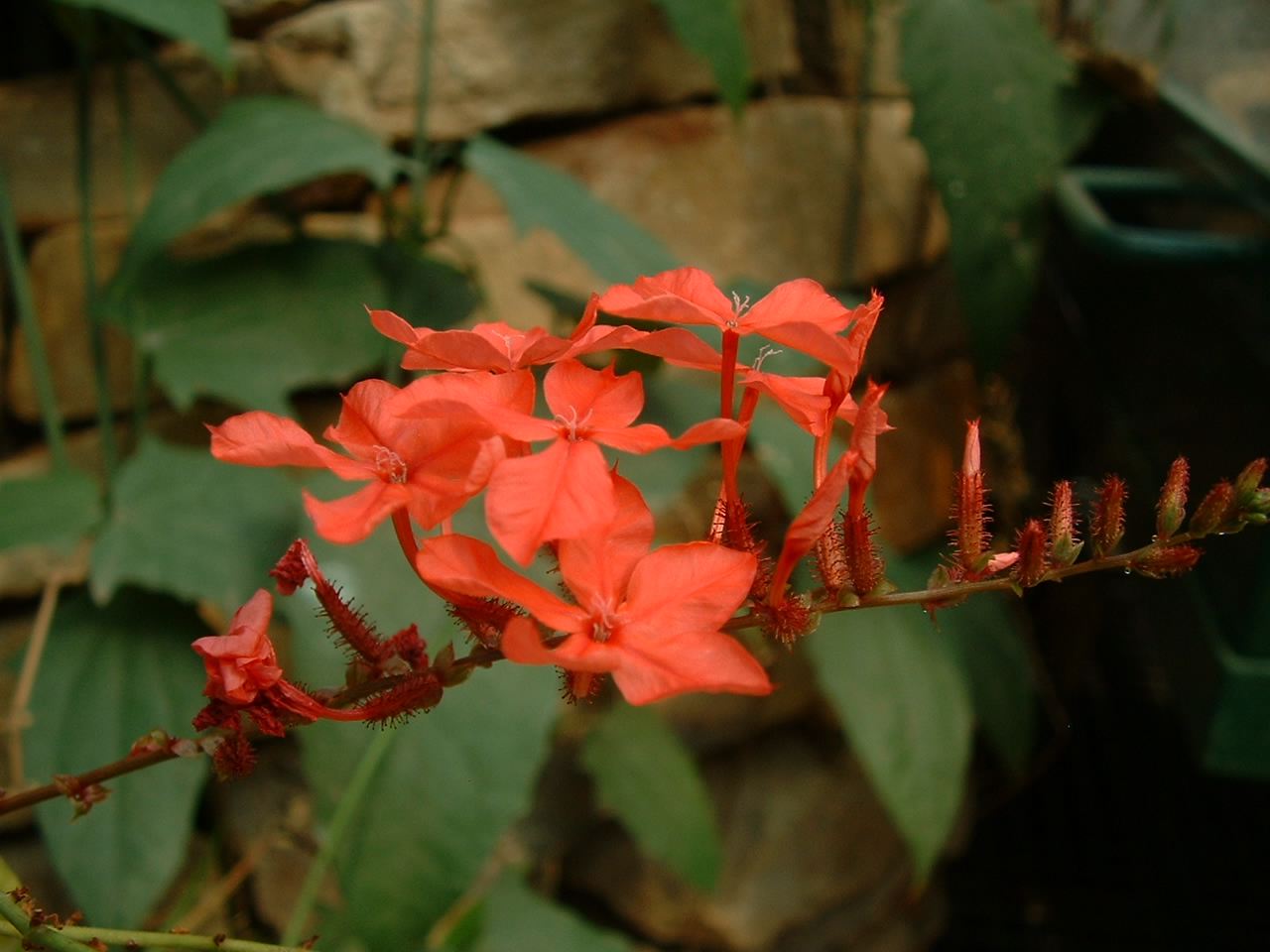

Scientific classification
- Kingdom: Plantae
- Clade: Tracheophytes
- Clade: Angiosperms
- Clade: Eudicots
- Order: Caryophyllales
- Family: Plumbaginaceae
- Genus: Plumbago
- Species: P. indica

Binomial name
- Plumbago indica L. (1754)

Synonyms
- Plumbagidium roseum (L.) Spach (1841); Plumbago coccinea Salisb. (1796), nom. superfl.; Plumbago rosea L. (1762); Plumbago rosea var. coccinea (Lour.) Hook. (1863); Thela coccinea Lour. (1790)

= Plumbago indica =

Species of flowering plant

Plumbago indica, the Indian leadwort, scarlet leadwort or whorled plantain, is a species of flowering plant in the family Plumbaginaceae, native to Southeast Asia, Indonesia, the Philippines, and Yunnan in southern China.

Growing to 2 m (7 ft) tall by 1 m (3 ft) wide, it is a spreading evergreen shrub with oval leaves. It produces racemes of deep pink or scarlet flowers in winter.

Plumbago indica is cultivated as an ornamental plant. With a minimum temperature of 7 °C (45 °F), it prefers subtropical or warm-temperate climates, or a greenhouse in cool climates.

It has gained the Royal Horticultural Society's Award of Garden Merit.
