= Barranco das Belharucas Beach =

Beach in Albufeira, Portugal

Coordinates: 37.08964°N 8.17841°W

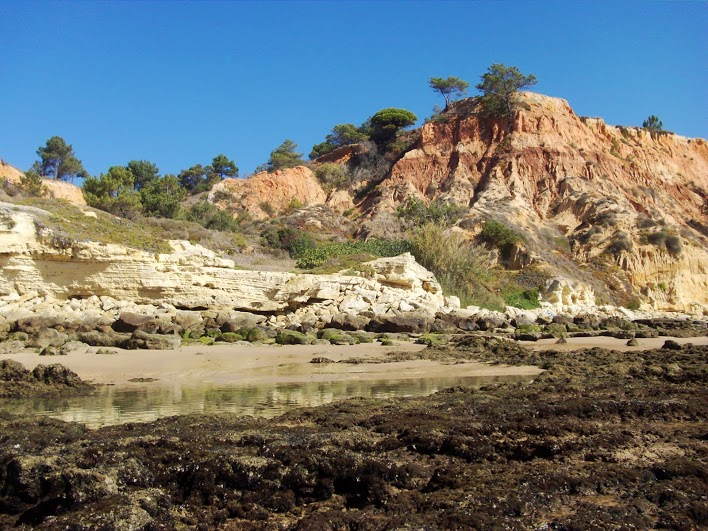
Natural Pool

Barranco das Belharucas Beach is a beach in the municipality of Albufeira, Portugal, between Olhos de Água and Açoteias. It begins the Falesia Beach that extends for 7 km to Vilamoura.

== Description ==
From this beach on, the deeply eroded limestone coastline of the western Algarve gives way to cliffs of sand and clay, which stretch eastwards to the municipality of Loulé. The trail runs through a deep gully with leafy vegetation growing alongside. The rocky slopes are deeply grooved due to rainwater runoff, creating a variety of sculpted shapes. The vegetation, mostly stone pines and typical coastal scrub plants such as juniper, sometimes grow on the edge of small abysses caused by landslides, with their tangled roots exposed to the air. Many birds dig shelters and nests in the rock face, including European bee-eaters, after which the beach is named.

== Access ==
Access can be made by car or on foot, by an unpaved track. There is a small parking lot next to the beach, with places for people with reduced mobility. Animals are not allowed on the beach.

== Infrastructure and equipment ==
The beach has lifeguards during the summer season (May to October). It has bathroom and showers, and umbrellas area. Services include pedal boats, jet skiing, water skiing and shark rides. There are two restaurants open to the public, one at the beginning of the beach and another on the east side belonging to the Sheraton Algarve Hotel & Pine Cliffs Resort.

== Sea temperature ==
The temperature of the seawater is maintained by 14 °C in January and August reaches 22 °C.

== Air temperature ==
A sea breeze usually maintains the annual average temperature of the Algarve which is 17,7 °C (12 °C in January to about 30 °C in August). The region has more than 3,000 hours of sunshine each year.

== Awards ==
Barranco das Belharucas is a Blue Flag beach. In 2000 it was awarded the "Bandeira Dourada" (Golden Flag) for its moderately used surroundings from an environmental point of view.
