= Praia da Rocha Baixinha =

Beach in Albufeira, Portugal

Praia da Rocha Baixinha (Praia dos Tomates)
- Beach
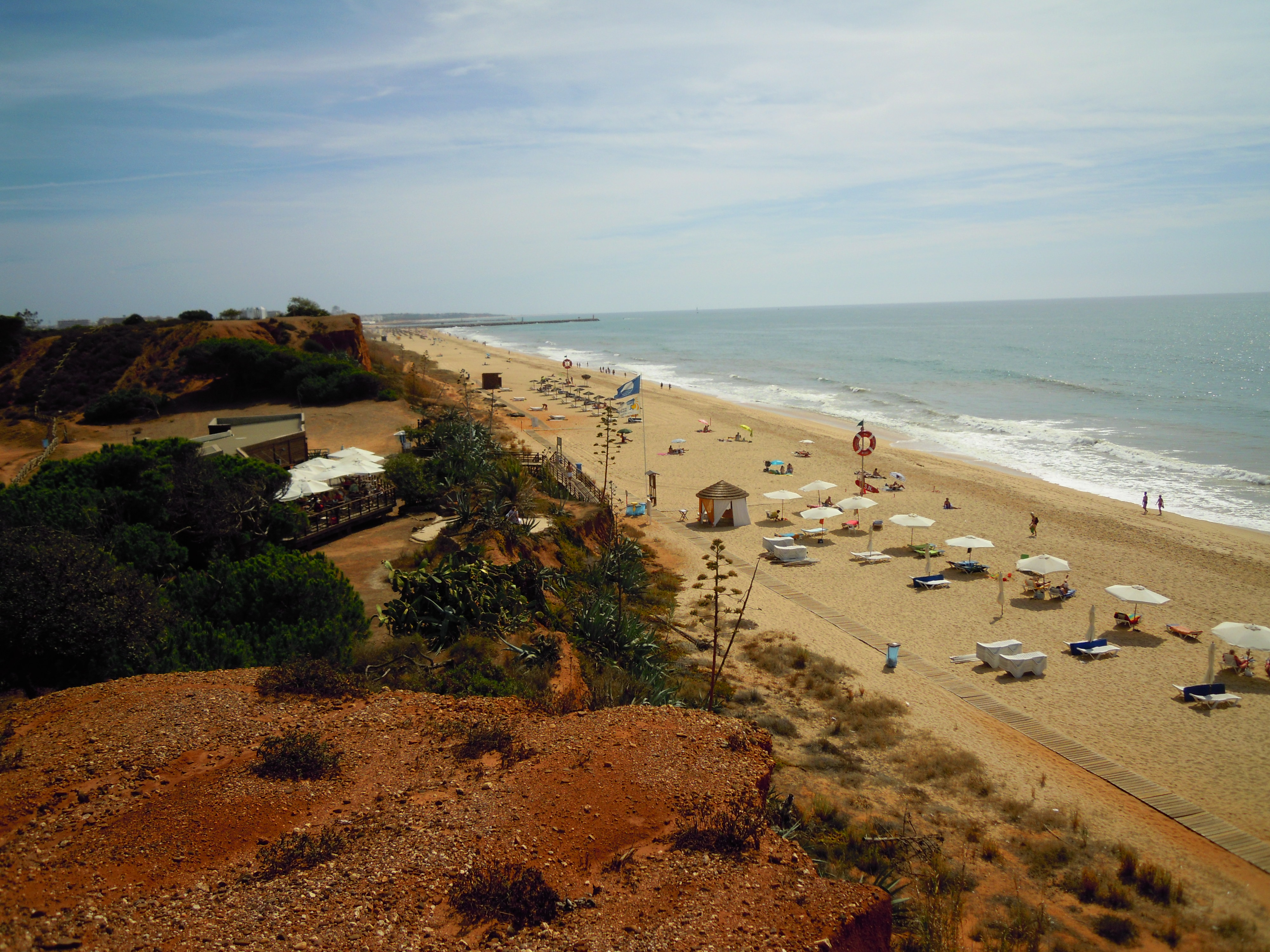
- Praia da Rocha Baixinha

- Location within Portugal
- Coordinates: 37°4′42″N 8°8′32″W
- Location: Albufeira, Western Algarve, Portugal

Praia da Rocha Baixinha or Praia dos Tomates (meaning in Portuguese Low Rock Beach and Tomatoes Beach respectively) is a beach within the Municipality of Albufeira, in the Algarve, Portugal. The beach is 13 kilometres (8.1 mi) east of the town of Albufeira and is 31.7 kilometres (19.7 mi) west of the regions capital of Faro. In 2012 Praia da Rocha Baixinha was designated a blue Flag beach.

Praia da Rocha Baixinha is the beach at the eastern end of Falesia Beach (Praia da Falésia) and is close to the marina and resort of Vilamoura. The beach is split into two areas, Rocha Baixinha Oeste (East) and Rocha Baixinha-Leste (West). Both beaches have been awarded blue flags. Rocha Baixinha Oeste is next to the mouth of the Quarteira River and the resort of Vilamoura is on the other side. The beach is wide with fine golden sand and stretches away westwards towards Praia da Falésia.
