= Dunas de Mira, Gândara e Gafanhas =

Protected area in Portugal

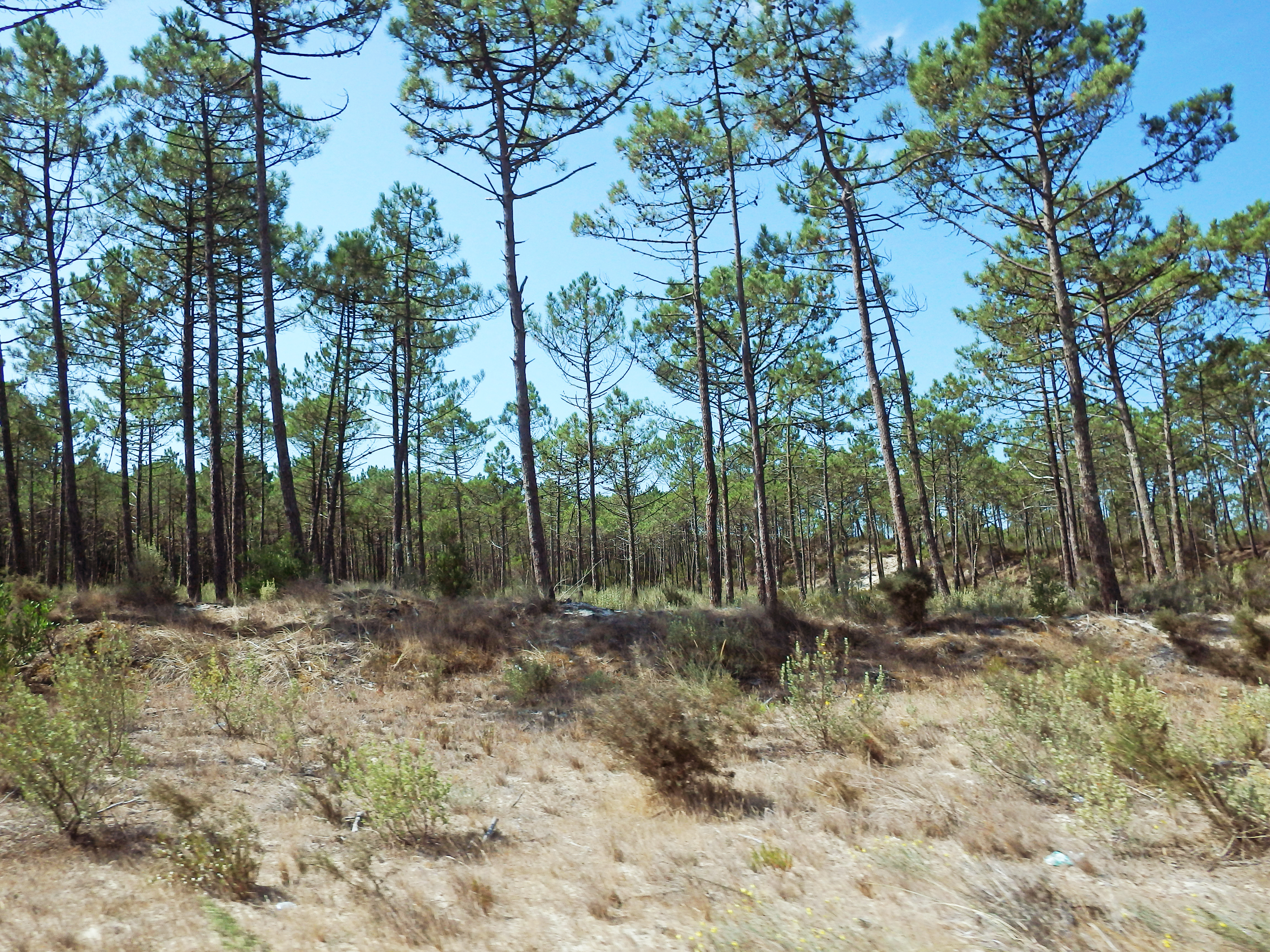
- Pinus pinaster, the dominant tree species in the Dunas de Mira, Gândara e Gafanhas Natura 2000 site
- Boundaries of the protected area
- Location: Centro, Portugal
- Coordinates: 40°21′21″N 8°48′45″W
- Area: 205.11 km^{2} (79.19 sq mi)
- Established: Resolução do Conselho de Ministros 76/00 de 5 de Julho
- Named for: its dune system
- Website: web.archive.org/web/20250102115153/https://www.icnf.pt/api/file/doc/f11e27c3140a5f15

Dunas de Mira, Gândara e Gafanhas (transl. Dunes of Mira, Gândara and Gafanhas), is a Natura 2000 Site of Community Importance (code: PTCON0055) in Portugal. It is located in the Centro region, in the districts of Aveiro and Coimbra.

== Geography ==
Dunas de Mira, Gândara e Gafanhas covers the dune system between Vagos and the Cape Mondego, in the municipalities of Vagos, Mira, Cantanhede, and Figueira da Foz. The protected area includes an area of 205.11 km^{2}.

=== Flora ===
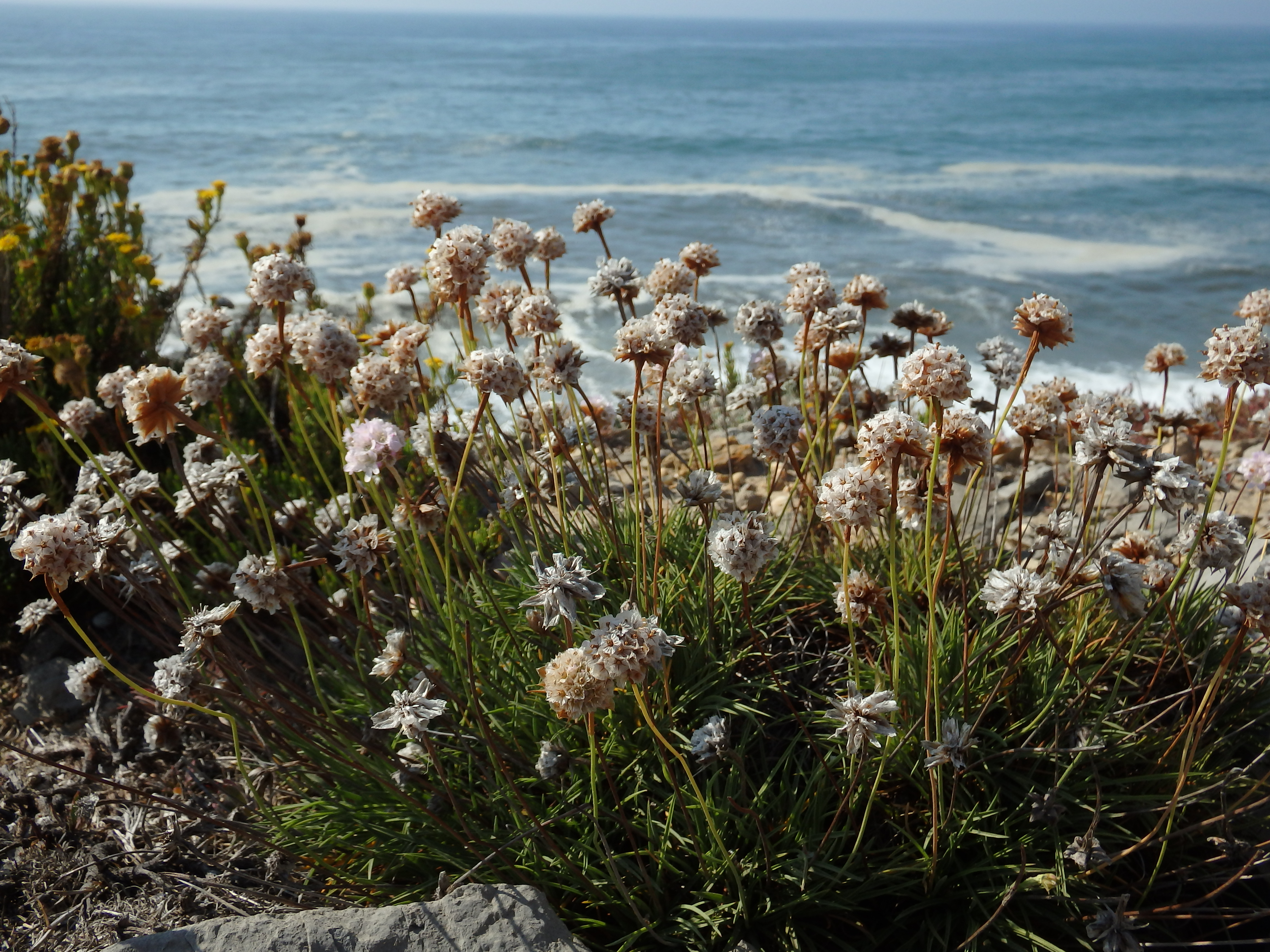
Armeria welwitschii, a Portuguese endemic, in the cliffs of the Cape Mondego

Vegetation within this protected area is dominated by plants adapted to coastal habitats, including Ammophila arenaria and Pinus pinaster. In the cliffs of Cape Mondego, Portuguese endemic species like Armeria welwitschii can be found. The area is also under threat by invasive species, including several Australian Acacia species, Carpobrotus edulis, Cortaderia selloana, and Myriophyllum aquaticum.
