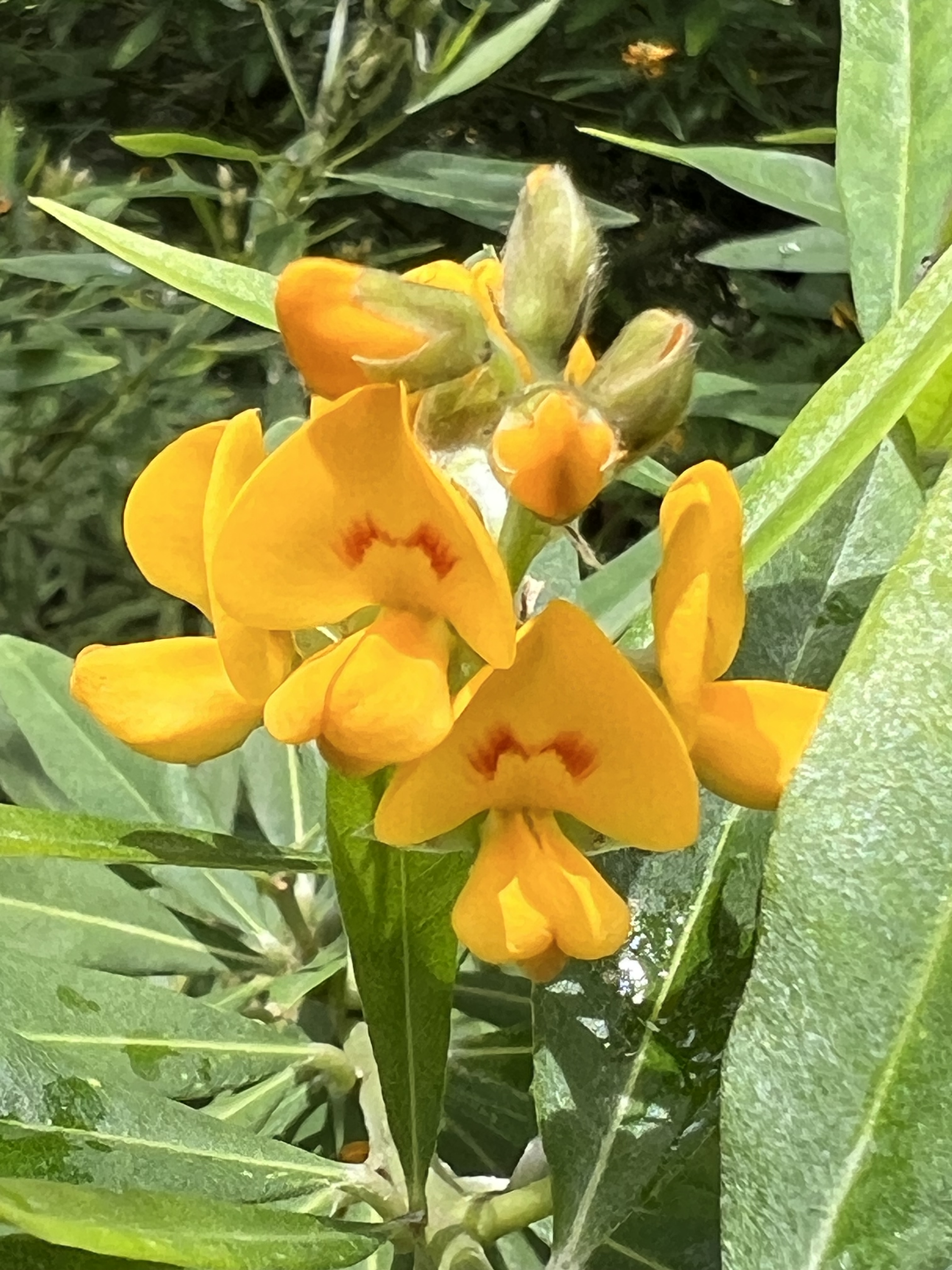

Scientific classification
- Kingdom: Plantae
- Clade: Tracheophytes
- Clade: Angiosperms
- Clade: Eudicots
- Clade: Rosids
- Order: Fabales
- Family: Fabaceae
- Subfamily: Faboideae
- Genus: Callistachys; Vent.
- Species: C. lanceolata

Binomial name
- Callistachys lanceolata Vent.

Synonyms
- Callistachys lancifolia F.Cels nom. illeg.; Chorizema callistachys F.Muell. nom. illeg.; Chorozema callistachys F.Muell. orth. var.; Oxylobium callistachys Benth. nom. illeg.; Oxylobium lanceolatum (Vent.) Daveau nom. illeg.; Oxylobium lanceolatum (Vent.) Ostenf. isonym; Oxylobium lanceolatum (Vent.) Domin isonym; Oxylobium lanceolatum (Vent.) Domin isonym; Pultenaea lanceolata (Vent.) Dum.Cours.; Pultenaea lanciolata Dum.Cours. orth. var.

= Callistachys =

Species of legume

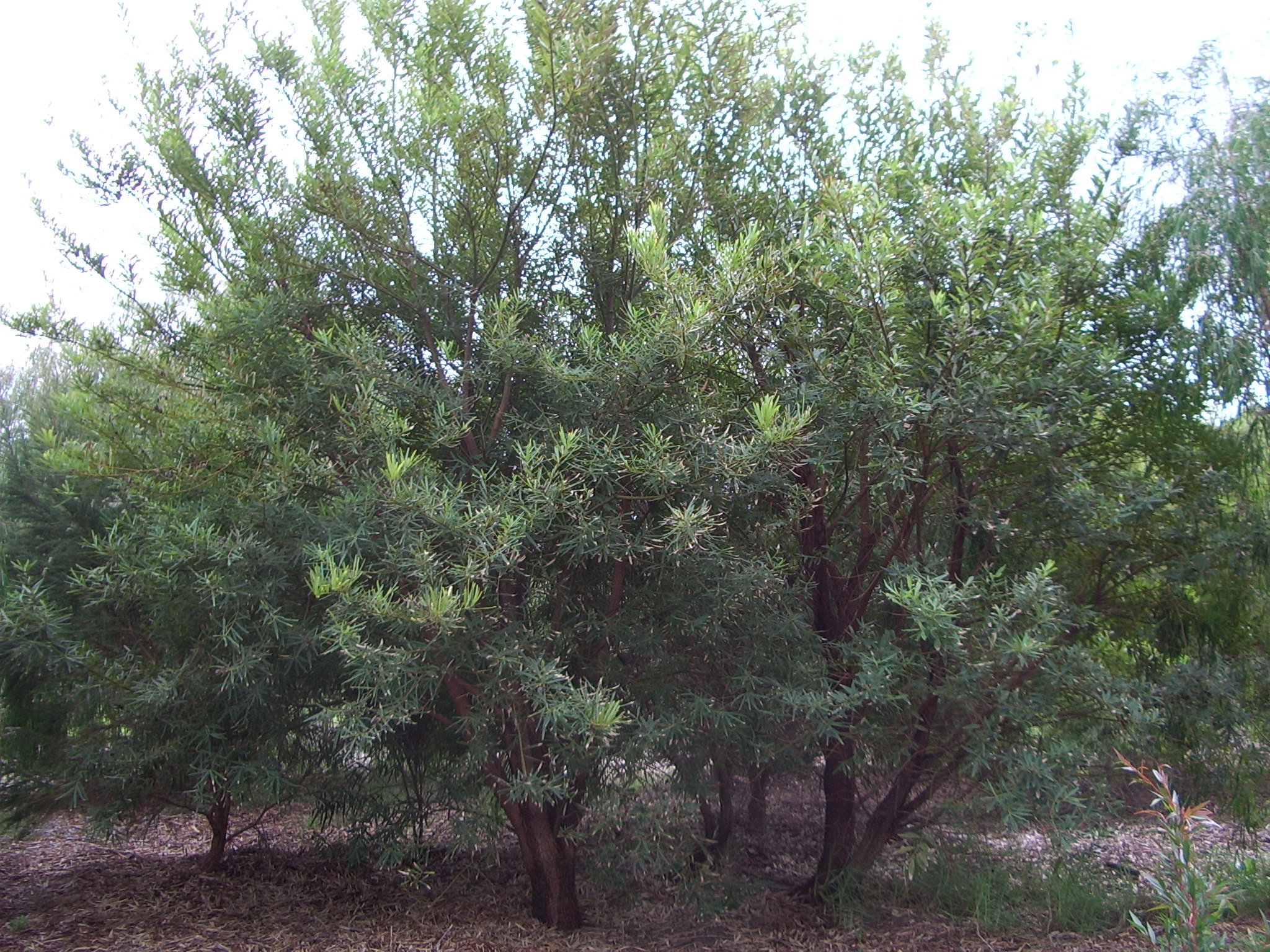
Habit

Callistachys lanceolata, commonly known as the wonnich, native willow, or greenbush is the sole species in the genus Callistachys. It is a species of erect shrub or small tree that is native to the south-west of Western Australia and is naturalised in some other Australian states.

== Description ==
Callistachys lanceolata is an erect evergreen tree or shrub that typically grows to a height of 1.5–7 m (4 ft 11 in – 23 ft 0 in) and has silky-hairy young stems. The plant has conspicuous and attractive inflorescence composed of racemes with yellow flowers. The plant flowers from September to January. The leaves of the plant are leathery and are arranged in whorls, most typically with three leaves per whorl. The leaves are generally regular in shape between 40 mm (1.6 in) to 170 mm (6.7 in) in length and 4 mm (0.16 in) to 30 mm (1.2 in) in width and have pointed tips.

== Distribution and habitat ==
Callistachys lanceolata occurs in the South West corner and South Coast of Western Australia. It grows well in sandy soils in areas that are damp, particularly along watercourses, swamps and culverts.

== Taxonomy ==
The genus Callistachys and Callistachys lanceolata were first formally described in 1805 by Étienne Pierre Ventenat in his book, Jardin de la Malmaison. The genus name, Callistachys means 'beautiful flower spike', and the species epithet (lanceolata) means lanceolate.

== Use in horticulture ==
Seeds can be collected from the plant but the pods the seeds are found in should be left to dry on the plant before they are broken open. The seeds should be scarified before sowing.
