= Falésia Beach =

Beach in Albufeira, Algarve, Portugal

Coordinates: 37.0867°N 8.1700°W

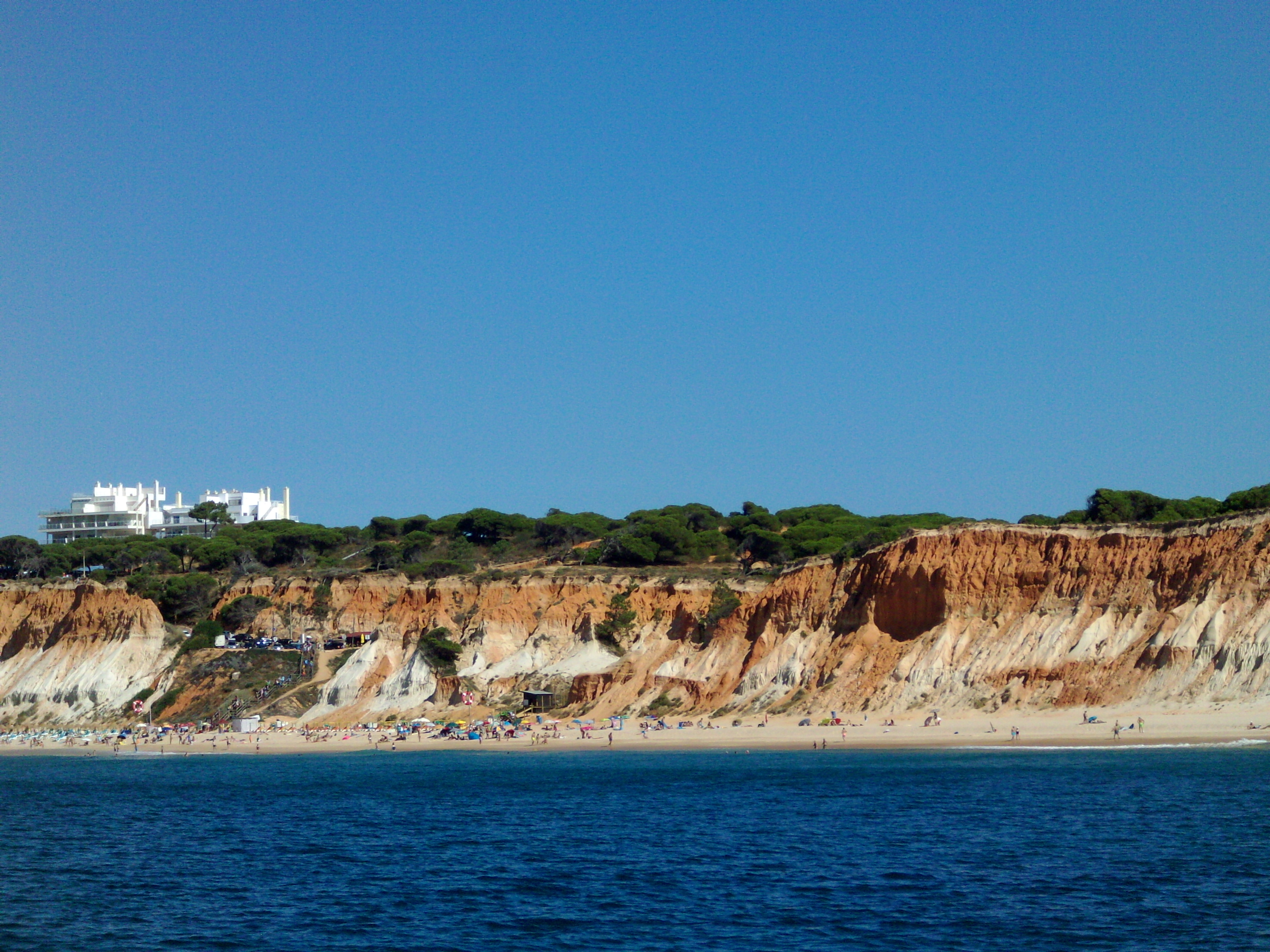
Falésia Beach seen from the sea

Falésia Beach (Portuguese: Praia da Falésia, meaning Cliff Beach) is a beach in Albufeira, Algarve, southern Portugal. It has a cliff that begins in the Barranco das Belharucas Beach and extends to Vilamoura.

== Description ==
The beach is part of a continuous stretch of sand almost 6 km in length. It is flanked by a line of high cliffs in deep tones ranging from reds to whitish, in contrasting colours with the green of the pine groves above. At the western end, the cliff is high but soft, composed of sand and clay, so the rain wears away grooves and gullies. To the east, the cliff is gradually losing height, while remaining deeply eroded. It is this erosion that keeps the beach sandy. As a result, small cones of sand form at the base of these cliffs, where typical dune plants such as sea daffodils, sea bindweed, spiny thrift, Cretan trefoil and sea holly have taken root. These species intermingle with the more monotonously-coloured vegetation typically found on cliffs, which here mostly consist of Mediterranean saltbush.

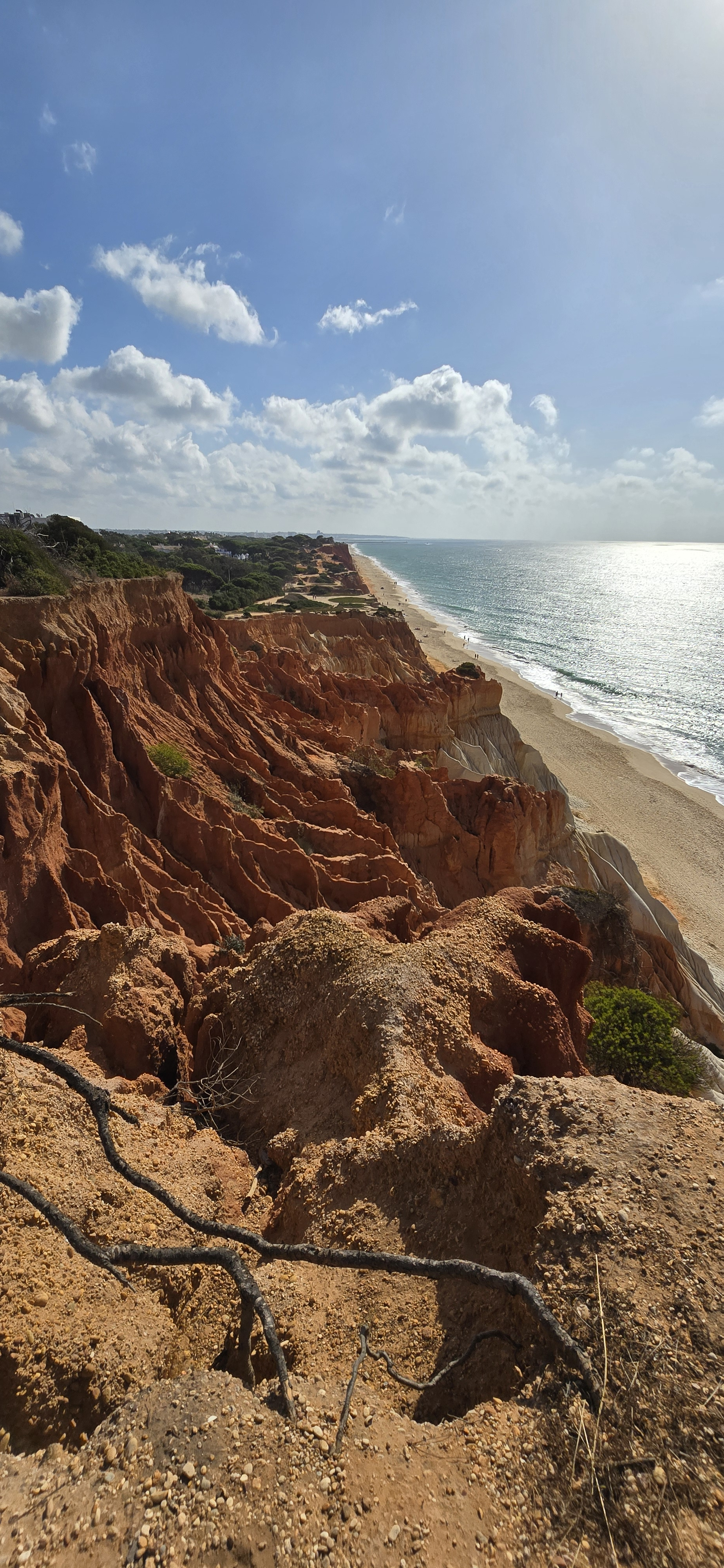
View from the cliffs above Falésia beach, looking east

== Access ==
Road access on tarmacked roads is via the Aldeia das Açoteias resort. There is parking at Açoteias, 300 m from the beach, and at the Alfamar resort, 250 m from the beach. The support infrastructure includes restaurants, WC and information facilities, as well as recreational facilities at Açoteias only. There are lifeguards on duty in the summer holiday season.

In Acoteias there are two camperhomes, each for 100 campers.
