= Albufeira (parish) =

Coordinates: 37.089°N 8.251°W

Albufeira is a former freguesia ("civil parish"), located in Albufeira Municipality, Portugal. In 2013, the parish merged into the new parish Albufeira e Olhos de Água. It has a population of 16,237 (2001) and an area of 26.49 km². It belongs to the city of Albufeira.
