= Albufeira e Olhos de Água =

- Civil parish
- Location in Portugal
- Coordinates: 37°05′43″N 8°13′05″W
- Country: Portugal
- Region: Algarve
- Intermunic. comm.: Algarve
- District: Faro
- Municipality: Albufeira

Area
  - Total: 41.18 km^{2} (15.90 sq mi)

Population (2011)
  - Total: 26,742
  - Density: 649.4/km^{2} (1,682/sq mi)
- Time zone: UTC+00:00 (WET)
  - Summer (DST): UTC+01:00 (WEST)

Albufeira e Olhos de Água is a freguesia ("civil parish") in Albufeira Municipality, Portugal. It was formed in 2013 by the merger of the former parishes Albufeira and Olhos de Água. The population in 2011 was 26,742, in an area of 41.18 km^{2}.
