= Armeria splendens =

Scientific classification
- Kingdom: Plantae
- Clade: Tracheophytes
- Clade: Angiosperms
- Clade: Eudicots
- Order: Caryophyllales
- Family: Plumbaginaceae
- Genus: Armeria
- Species: A. splendens

Binomial name
- Armeria splendens (Lag. & Rodr.) Webb

Species of flowering plant

Armeria splendens is an ornamental plant in the family Plumbaginaceae, which is native to Europe.
