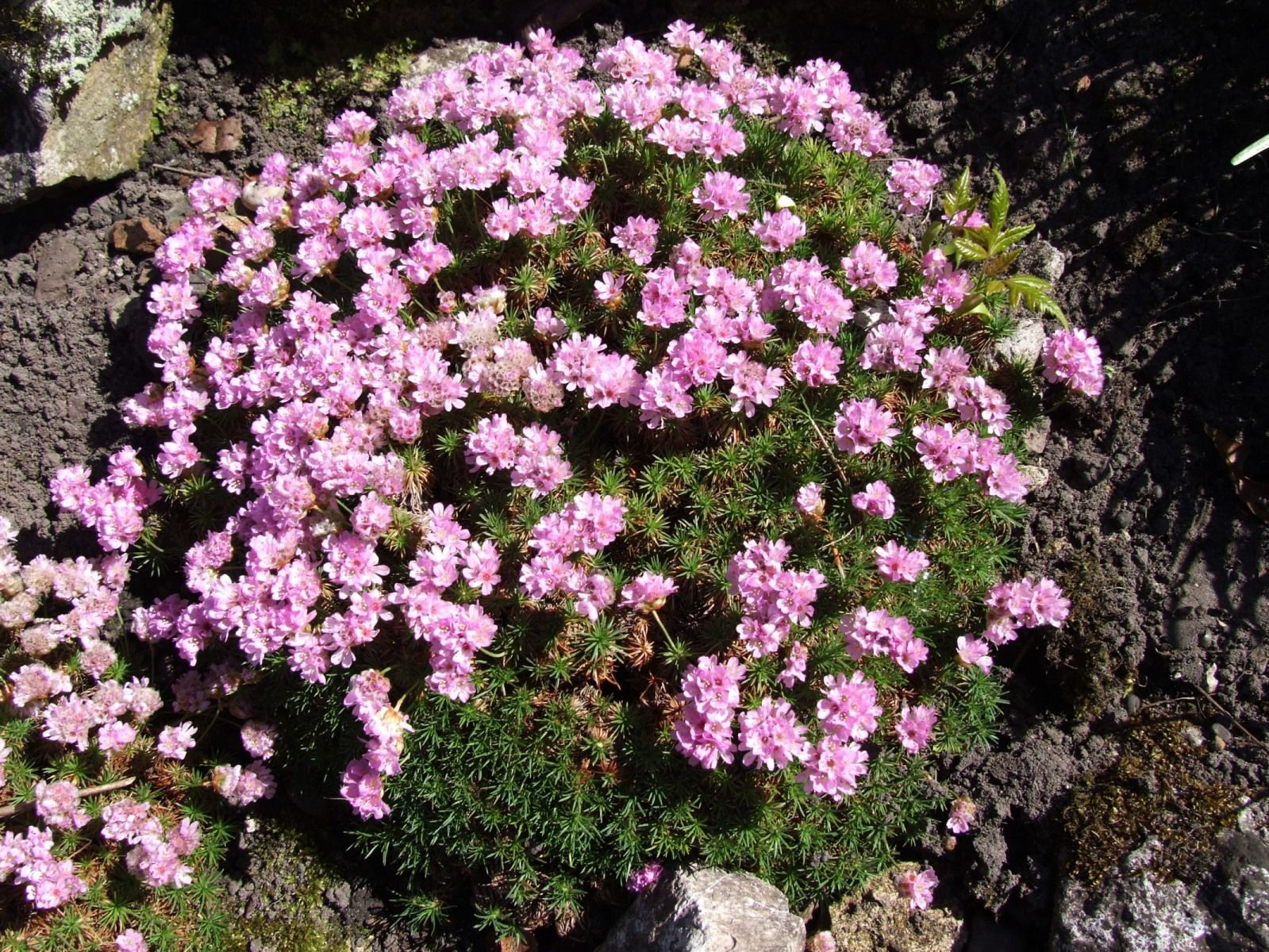

Scientific classification
- Kingdom: Plantae
- Clade: Tracheophytes
- Clade: Angiosperms
- Clade: Eudicots
- Order: Caryophyllales
- Family: Plumbaginaceae
- Genus: Armeria
- Species: A. humilis

Binomial name
- Armeria humilis (Link) Schult.

Subspecies
- Armeria humilis subsp. humilis; Armeria humilis subsp. odorata (Samp.) P.Silva

Synonyms
- Armeria caespitosa var. humilis (Link) Pau, C.Vicioso & Beltrán; Armeria maritima var. humilis (Link) Bernis; Armeria maritima subsp. humilis (Link) Bernis; Armeria vulgaris pubescens T.Marsson, nom. illeg.; Statice humilis Link; synonyms of subsp. humilis: Armeria juniperifolia (Vahl) Hoffmanns. & Link; Armeria willkommii Henriq.; Statice caespitosa Cav., nom. illeg. homonym. post.; Statice juniperifolia Vahl, nom. rej.; synonyms of subsp. odorata: Armeria maritima subsp. odorata (Samp.) Bernis; Armeria maritima var. odorata (Samp.) Bernis; Armeria willkommii var. odorata Samp.; Statice humilis var. odorata (Samp.) Samp.

= Armeria humilis =

Species of flowering plant

Armeria humilis, the juniper-leaved thrift, is a species of flowering plant in the family Plumbaginaceae. It is a subshrub native to the Serra Amarela and Serra do Gerês of Portugal and Spain in the northwestern Iberian Peninsula.

It is a mat-forming evergreen perennial, with pale pink clover-like flowers appearing in Spring above dark green, needle-like foliage.

The species was first described as Statice humilis by Johann Heinrich Friedrich Link in 1801. In 1820 Josef August Schultes placed the species in genus Armeria as A. humilis. Two subspecies are accepted:

- Armeria humilis subsp. humilis
- Armeria humilis subsp. odorata (Samp.) P.Silva

Cultivars, mostly known by the synonym Armeria juniperifolia, have been developed for garden use, where it is suitable for cultivation in the alpine or rock garden. Previously this species and the cultivar 'Bevan's Variety' gained the Royal Horticultural Society's Award of Garden Merit, but the plants tested turned out be members of the species Armeria caespitosa, so the Awards have been reassigned.

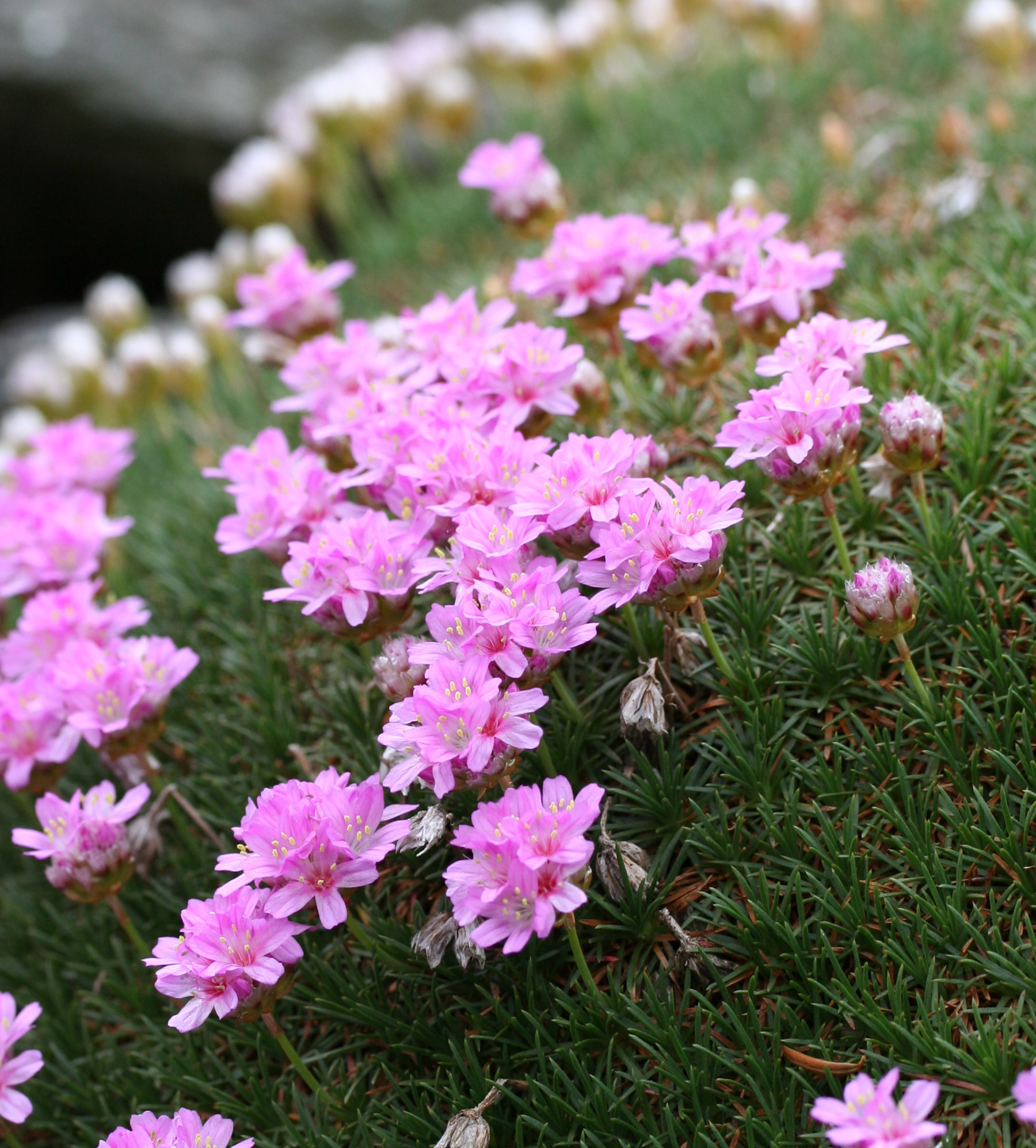
A. juniperifolia, Dresden Botanical Garden
