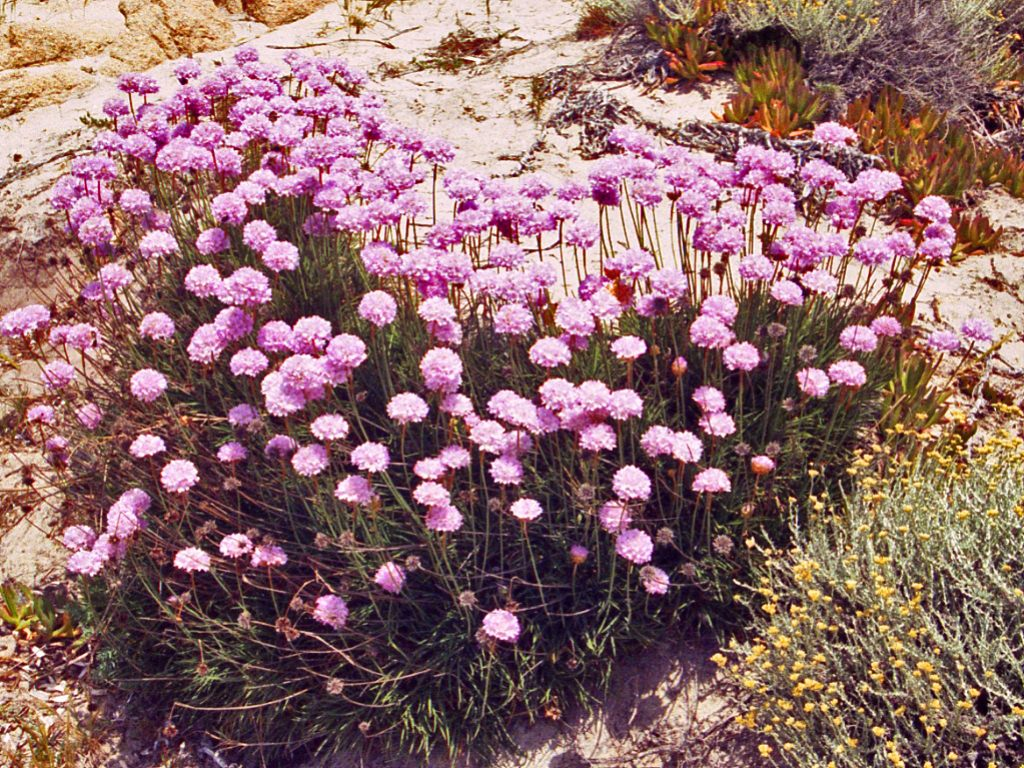
- Plants of Armeria pungens in Sardinia

Scientific classification
- Kingdom: Plantae
- Clade: Embryophytes
- Clade: Tracheophytes
- Clade: Spermatophytes
- Clade: Angiosperms
- Clade: Eudicots
- Order: Caryophyllales
- Family: Plumbaginaceae
- Genus: Armeria
- Species: A. pungens

Binomial name
- Armeria pungens (Brot.) Hoffmanns. & Link

= Armeria pungens =

Species of flowering plant

Armeria pungens, common name spiny thrift, is a rare plant of the genus Armeria of the family Plumbaginaceae.

== Description ==
Armeria pungens grows in small shrubs, reaching heights of about 80 centimetres (31 in). The stems are lignified at the base, robust, highly branched. Leaves are glabrous, linear to lanceolate, pointed, about 60–150 millimetres (2.4–5.9 in) long and about 1–3.5 millimetres (0.039–0.138 in) wide. Flower heads are pale pink, gathered in globose inflorescences at the top of long pedicels. Flowering period extends from May through July.

== Distribution ==
This plant is endemic to Italy (Sardinia), France (Corsica), Portugal and Spain.

== Habitat ==
This small shrub grows in coastal sand-dunes and beaches, at an elevation of about 0–1 metre (0.0–3.3 ft) above sea level.

== Synonyms ==
- Armeria fasciculata var. intermedia Daveau
- Armeria fasciculata var. pungens (Link) Arcang.
- Armeria fasciculata (Vent.) Willd.
- Armeria maritima subsp. pungens (Link) Bernis
- Reverchonia fasciculata (Vent.) Gand.
- Reverchonia pungens (Link) Gand.
- Statice fasciculata var. pungens (Link) Samp.
- Statice fasciculata Vent.
- Statice pungens Brot.

== Gallery ==
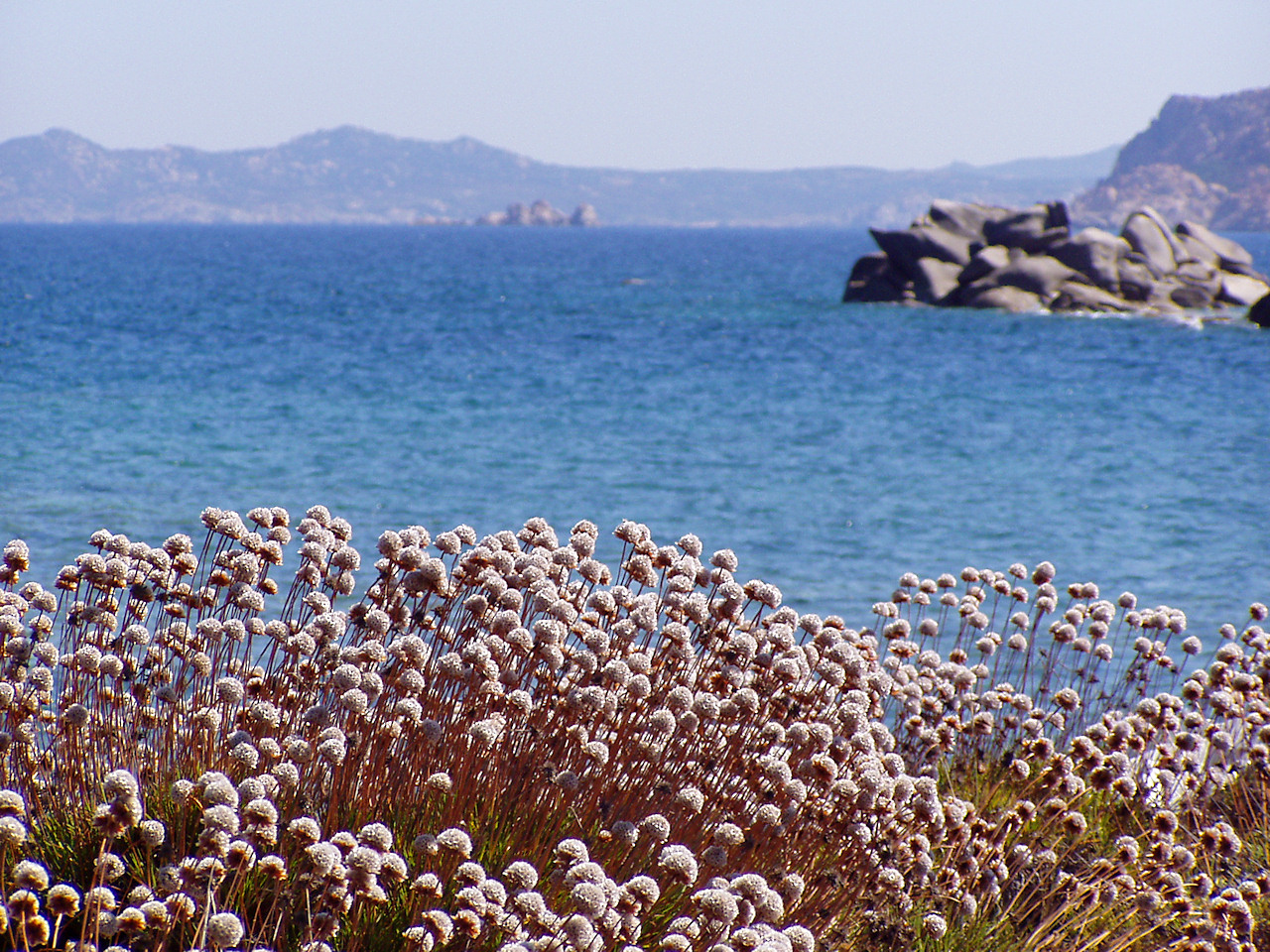
Armeria pungens in Sardinia, Italy

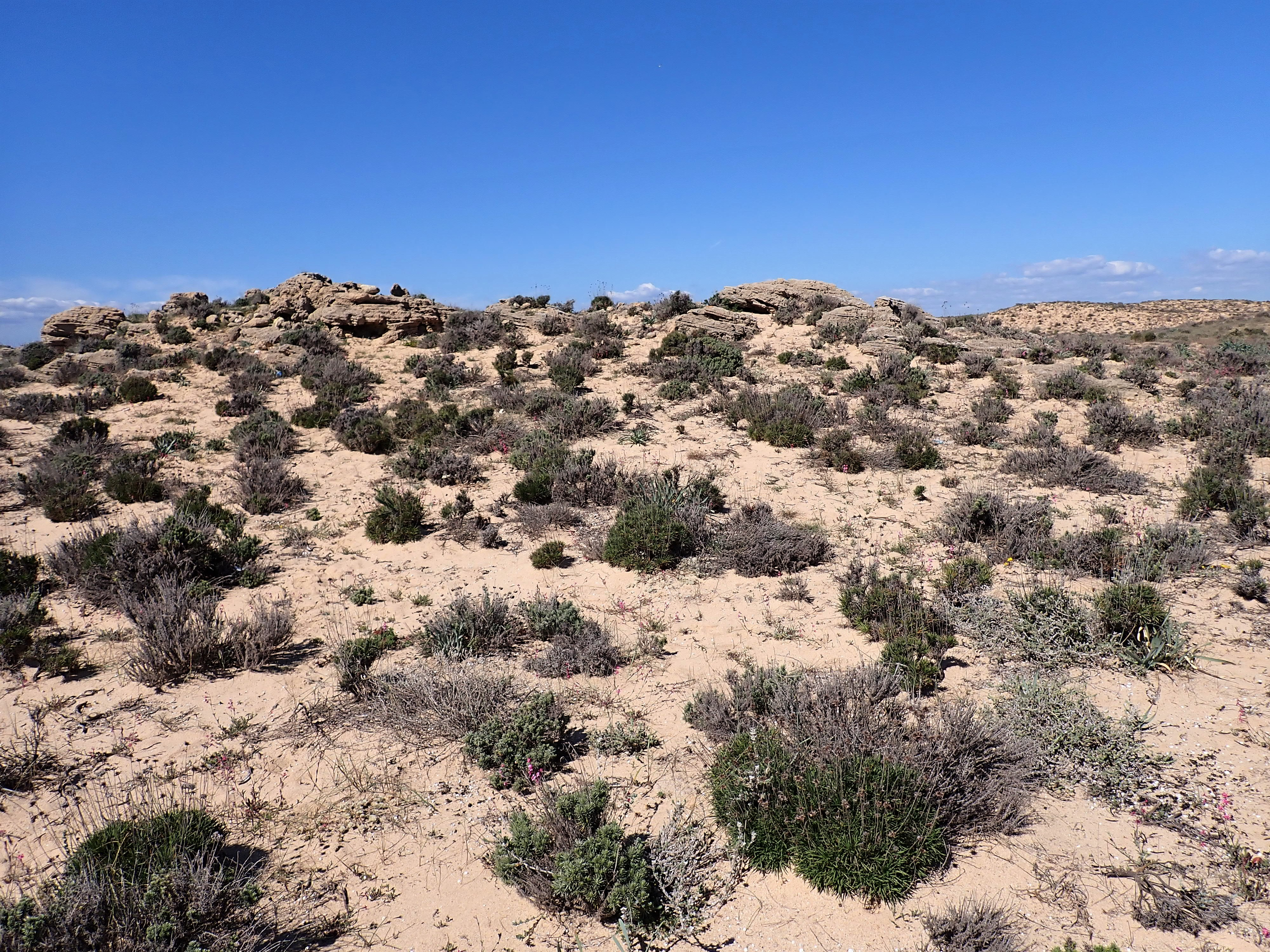
Praia Grande Nascente in district Faro in Portugal
