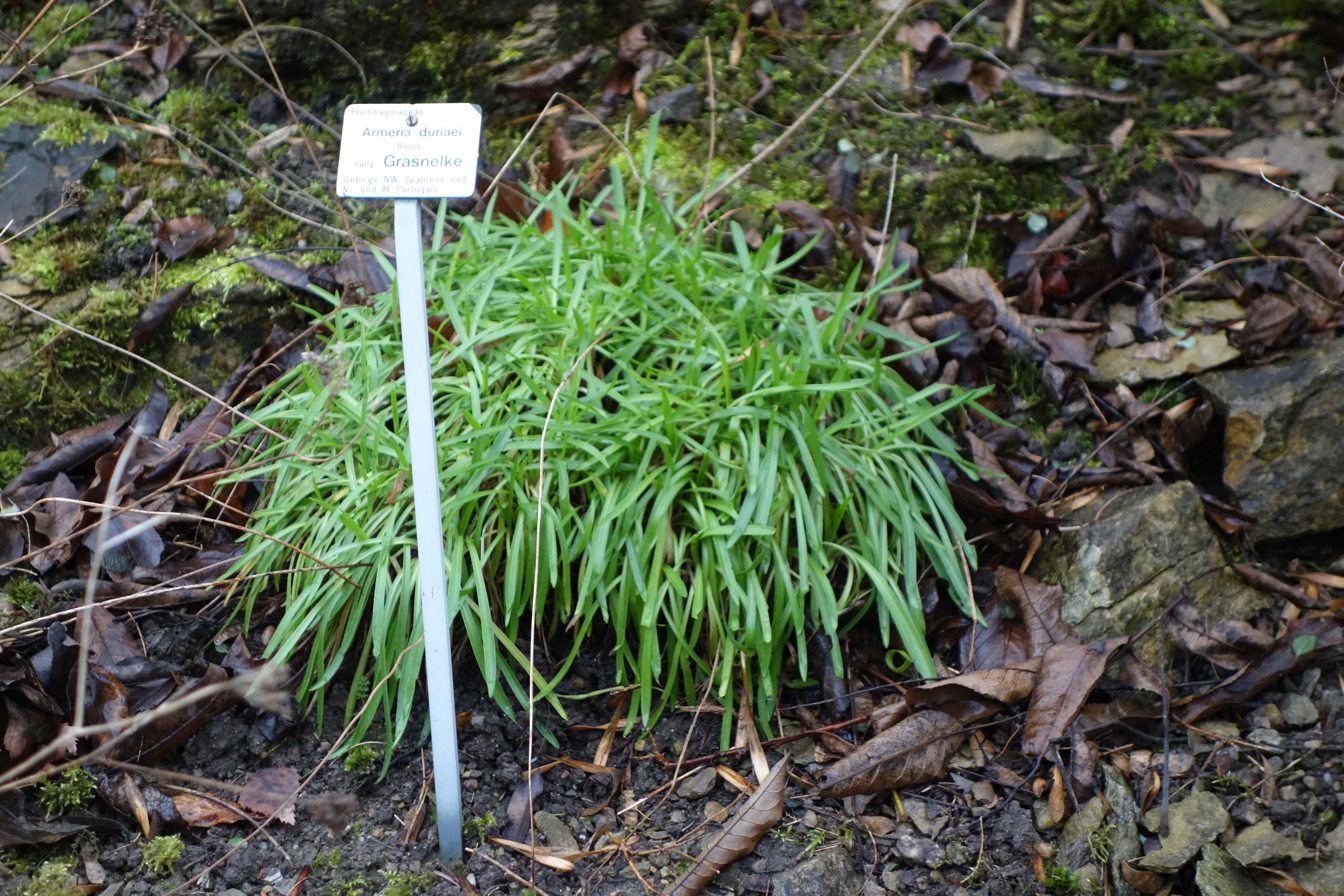

Scientific classification
- Kingdom: Plantae
- Clade: Embryophytes
- Clade: Tracheophytes
- Clade: Angiosperms
- Clade: Eudicots
- Order: Caryophyllales
- Family: Plumbaginaceae
- Genus: Armeria
- Species: A. duriaei

Binomial name
- Armeria duriaei Boiss.

Synonyms
- Armeria juniperifolia J.Gay ex Boiss.; Statice asturiana Rothm.

= Armeria duriaei =

Species of flowering plant

Armeria duriaei is a flowering plant in the family Plumbaginaceae. It is endemic to mountains of north-western Spain. Its flowers are usually pink, or rarely white.

== Sources ==
- The Plant List entry
- Alpine Garden Society entry
- JSTOR entry
