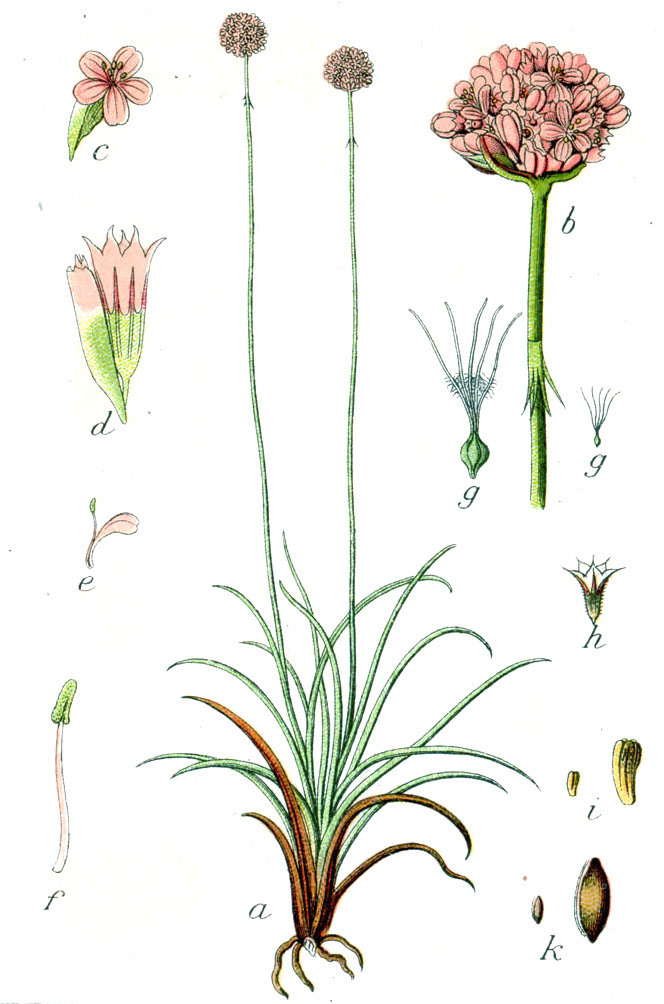
- by Sturm (1796)

Scientific classification
- Kingdom: Plantae
- Clade: Tracheophytes
- Clade: Angiosperms
- Clade: Eudicots
- Order: Caryophyllales
- Family: Plumbaginaceae
- Genus: Armeria (DC.) Willd.

Species
- 101; see text

Synonyms
- Polyanthemum Medik.; Statice L., nom. rej.

= Armeria =

Genus of flowering plants

Armeria is a genus of flowering plants. These plants are sometimes known as lady's cushion, thrift, or sea pink (the latter because as they are often found on coastlines). The genus counts over a hundred species, mostly native to the Mediterranean, although Armeria maritima is an exception, being distributed along the coasts of the Northern Hemisphere, including Ireland, parts of the United Kingdom such as Cornwall, and the Pembrokeshire Coast National Park in Wales.

Some are popular with gardeners as rockery plants.

During the Second World War, the UK thruppenny bit coin (3 old pence), which had featured a portcullis on its reverse side, changed to a depiction of the thrift plant, as a means of reminding the population of the need to avoid waste and practise thrift. After the war, it reverted to the portcullis.

== Species ==
101 species are currently accepted:

- Armeria alboi (Bernis) Nieto Fel.
- Armeria alliacea (Cav.) Hoffmanns. & Link
- Armeria alpina (DC.) Willd.
- Armeria alpinifolia Pau & Font Quer
- Armeria apollinaris Sennen & Mauricio
- Armeria arcuata Welw. ex Boiss. & Reut.
- Armeria arenaria (Pers.) F.Dietr.
- Armeria aspromontana Brullo, Scelsi & Sampinato
- Armeria atlantica Pomel
- Armeria beirana Franco
- Armeria belgenciensis Donad. ex Kerguélen
- Armeria berlengensis Daveau
- Armeria bigerrensis (Pau ex C.Vicioso & Beltrán) Pau ex Rivas Mart.
- Armeria bourgaei Boiss. ex Merino
- Armeria brutia Brullo, Gangale & Uzunov
- Armeria caballeroi (Bernis) Donad.
- Armeria caespitosa (Ortega) Boiss.
- Armeria canescens (Host) Boiss.
- Armeria cantabrica Boiss. & Reut. ex Willk.
- Armeria capitella Pau
- Armeria cariensis Boiss.
- Armeria × carnotana Blanco-Dios
- Armeria castellana Boiss. & Reut. ex Leresche
- Armeria castrovalnerana Alejandre, Barredo & M.J.Escal.
- Armeria castroviejoi Nieto Fel.
- Armeria choulettiana Pomel
- Armeria ciliata (Lange) Nieto Fel.
- Armeria × cintrana Taul.Gomes
- Armeria colorata Pau
- Armeria curvifolia Bertero
- Armeria denticulata (Bertol.) DC.
- Armeria duriaei Boiss.
- Armeria ebracteata Pomel
- Armeria eriophylla Willk.
- Armeria euscadiensis Donad. & Vivant
- Armeria filicaulis (Boiss.) Boiss.
- Armeria fontqueri Pau
- Armeria gaditana Boiss.
- Armeria garganica Arrigoni
- Armeria genesiana Nieto Fel.
- Armeria girardii (Bernis) Litard.
- Armeria godayana Font Quer
- Armeria gracilis Ten.
- Armeria grajoana Casim.-Sor.Solanas & Cabezudo
- Armeria gussonei Boiss.
- Armeria helodes F.Martini & Poldini
- Armeria hirta Willd.
- Armeria hispalensis Pau
- Armeria humilis (Link) Schult.
- Armeria icarica Edm.
- Armeria johnsenii Papan. & Kokkini
- Armeria langei Boiss.
- Armeria leonis Sennen
- Armeria leucocephala Salzm. ex W.D.J.Koch
- Armeria linkiana Nieto Fel.
- Armeria macrophylla Boiss. & Reut.
- Armeria macropoda Boiss.
- Armeria maderensis Lowe
- Armeria malacitana Nieto Fel.
- Armeria malinvaudii H.J.Coste & Soulié
- Armeria maritima – sea thrift, sea cushion, sea pink
- Armeria masguindalii (Pau) Nieto Fel.
- Armeria mauritanica Wallr.
- Armeria merinoi (Bernis) Nieto Fel. & Silva Pando
- Armeria montiberica García Cardo, Fabado & Mateo
- Armeria morisii Boiss.
- Armeria muelleri A.L.P.Huet
- Armeria nebrodensis (Guss.) Boiss.
- Armeria neglecta Girard
- Armeria × nieto-felineri Rivas Mart., T.E.Díaz & Fern.Gonz.
- Armeria pauana (Bernis) Nieto Fel.
- Armeria × pilariae Sánchez Gullón, Muñoz Rodr. & Polo Ávila
- Armeria pinifolia (Brot.) Hoffmanns. & Link
- Armeria pocutica Pawł.
- Armeria pseudarmeria (Murray) Mansf.
- Armeria pubigera (Desf.) Boiss.
- Armeria pubinervis Boiss.
- Armeria pungens (Brot.) Hoffmanns. & Link
- Armeria quichiotis (Gonz.Albo) A.W.Hill
- Armeria rhodopea Velen.
- Armeria rivasmartinezii Sard.Rosc. & Nieto Fel.
- Armeria rothmaleri Nieto Fel.
- Armeria rouyana Daveau
- Armeria rumelica Boiss.
- Armeria ruscinonensis Girard
- Armeria × salmantica (Bernis) Nieto Fel.
- Armeria sampaioi (Bernis) Nieto Fel.
- Armeria sancta Janka
- Armeria sardoa Spreng.
- Armeria saviana Selvi
- Armeria seticeps Rchb.
- Armeria simplex Pomel
- Armeria soleirolii (Duby) Godr.
- Armeria spinulosa Boiss.
- Armeria splendens (Lag. & Rodr.) Webb
- Armeria sulcitana Arrigoni
- Armeria tingitana Boiss. & Reut.
- Armeria trachyphylla Lange
- Armeria transmontana (Samp.) G.H.M.Lawr.
- Armeria trianoi Nieto Fel.
- Armeria trojana Bokhari & Quézel
- Armeria undulata (Bory & Chaub.) Boiss.
- Armeria vandasii Hayek
- Armeria velutina Welw. ex Boiss. & Reut.
- Armeria villosa Girard
- Armeria welwitschii Boiss.

== Bibliography ==
Armitage, James (2013), "Longshore thrift", The Garden, 138 (4), Royal Horticultural Society: 47–50

- Media related to Armeria at Wikimedia Commons
