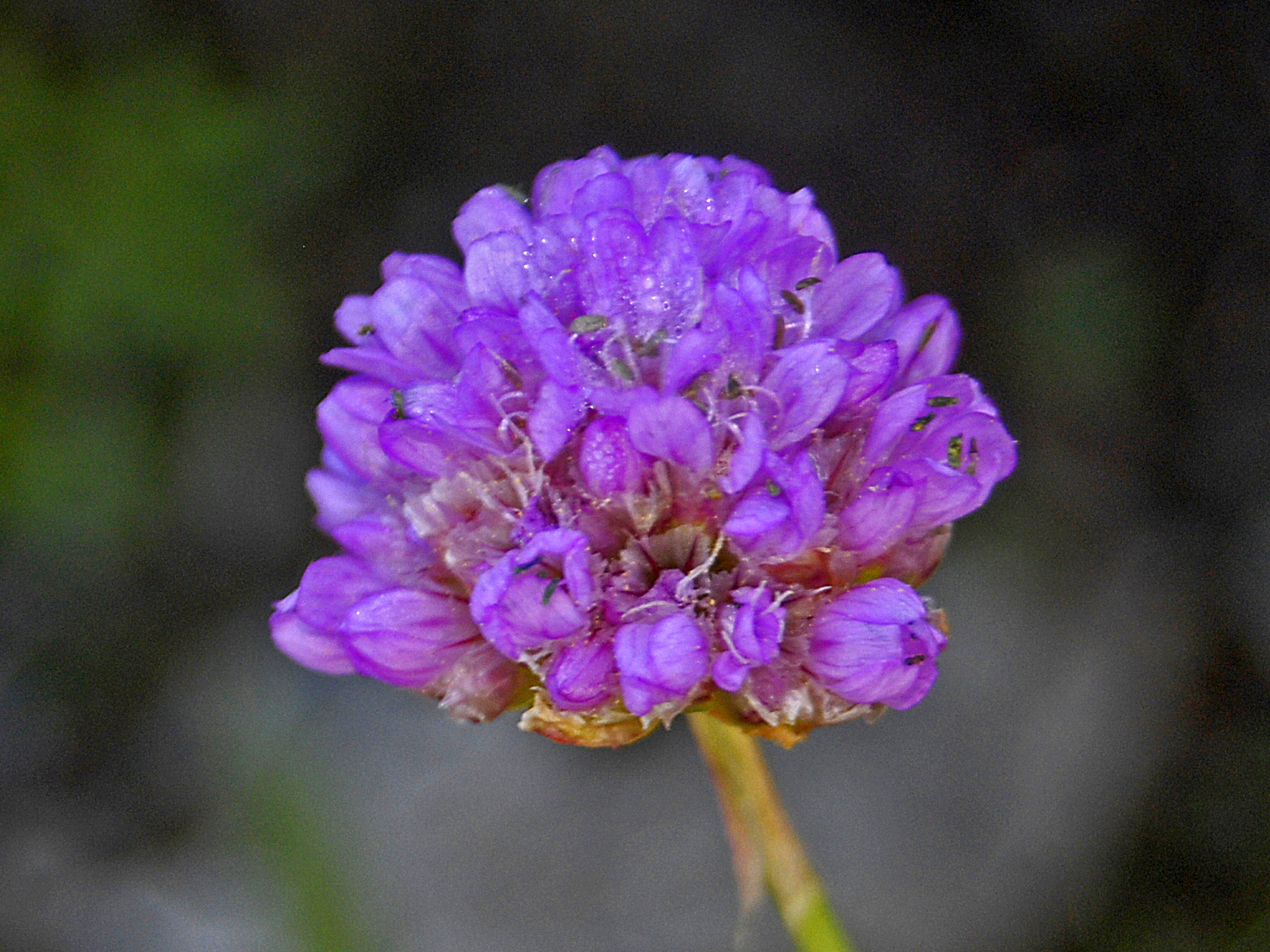
- Armeria alpina flower, at the Giardino Botanico Alpino Chanousia

Scientific classification
- Kingdom: Plantae
- Clade: Tracheophytes
- Clade: Angiosperms
- Clade: Eudicots
- Order: Caryophyllales
- Family: Plumbaginaceae
- Genus: Armeria
- Species: A. alpina

Binomial name
- Armeria alpina Willd.

Synonyms
- Armeria maritima subsp. alpina (Willd.) P.Silva

= Armeria alpina =

Species of flowering plant

Armeria alpina is a flowering plant in the family Plumbaginaceae.

== Description ==
Armeria alpina can reach a height of 7–30 centimetres (2.8–11.8 in). Leaves are simple and mostly hairless. They form dense basal rosettes of about 25 leaves. The flowers are small, with five pink petals. They are grouped into inflorescences at the end of long pedicels. They bloom from July to August.

== Distribution ==
Armeria alpina is native to France, Italy, Austria and the Balkan Peninsula and Spain, in the Pyrenees.

== Habitat ==
This species prefers rocks, gravel and meadows at an elevation 1,400–2,700 metres (4,600–8,900 ft) above sea level.
