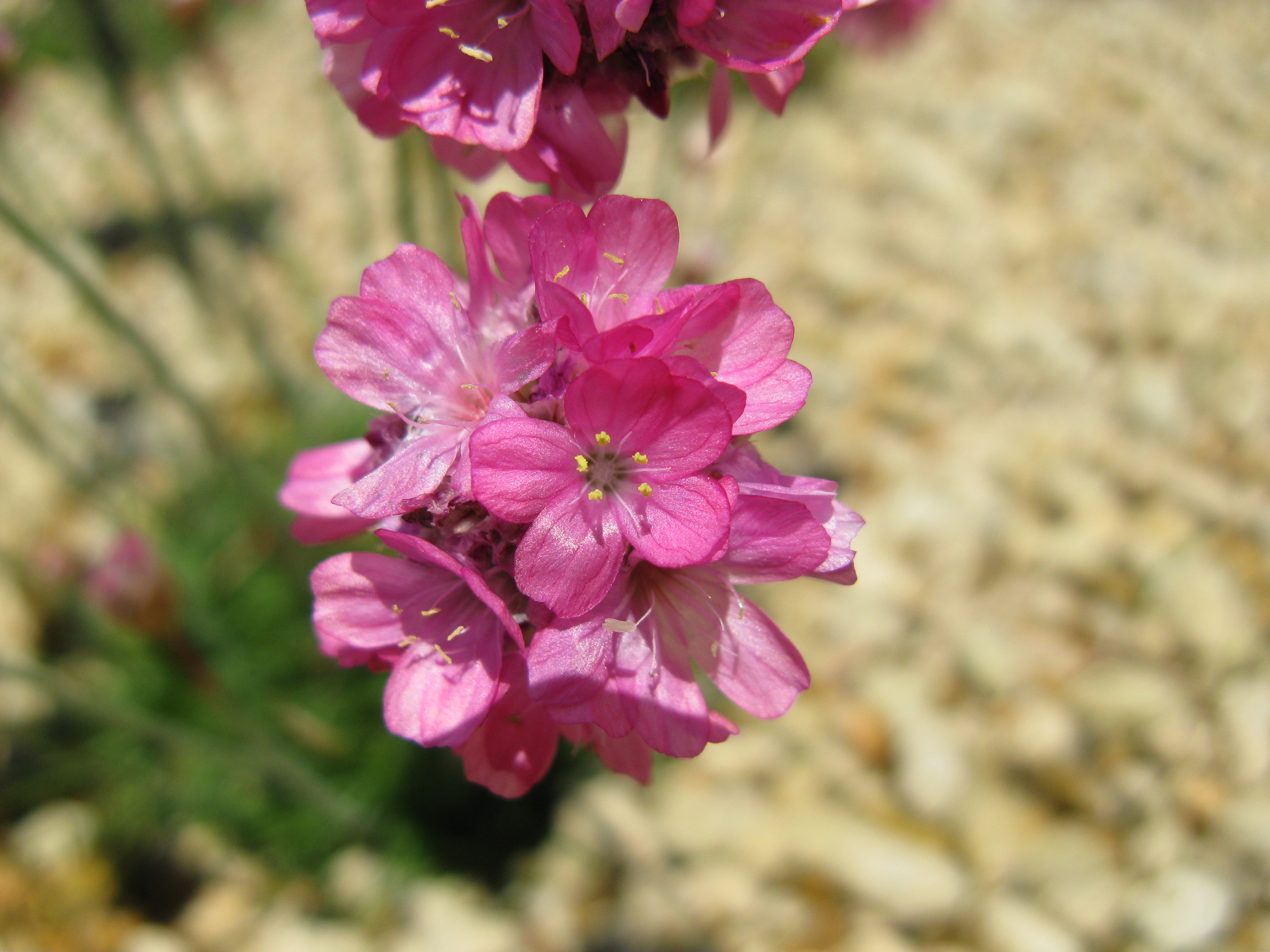
- Close-up of flowers
- Habit

Scientific classification
- Kingdom: Plantae
- Clade: Tracheophytes
- Clade: Angiosperms
- Clade: Eudicots
- Order: Caryophyllales
- Family: Plumbaginaceae
- Genus: Armeria
- Species: A. caespitosa

Binomial name
- Armeria caespitosa (Ortega) Boiss.

Synonyms
- List: Armeria caespitosa var. isernii Vicioso & Beltrán; Armeria juniperifolia var. isernii (Vicioso & Beltrán) G.H.M.Lawr.; Armeria maritima var. caespitosa (Ortega) Bernis; Statice caespitosa Ortega; Statice isernii (Vicioso & Beltrán) Font Quer & Rothm.

= Armeria caespitosa =

Species of plant

Armeria caespitosa, the juniper-leaved thrift (a name it shares with Armeria juniperifolia), is a species of flowering plant in the family Plumbaginaceae. It is native to central Spain. A mat-forming evergreen perennial reaching 5 cm (2 in) tall and 30 cm (12 in) wide, it is recommended for rock and trough gardens. With its dark pink flowers and prostrate cushion habit, it and its cultivar 'Bevan's Variety' have gained the Royal Horticultural Society's Award of Garden Merit; previously the Award was incorrectly assigned to Armeria juniperifolia.
