= Olhos de Água =

Former civil parish in Portugal

Coordinates: 37°05′43″N 8°10′26″W

Olhos de Água is a former freguesia ("civil parish"), located in the municipality of Albufeira, Portugal. In 2013, the parish merged into the new parish Albufeira e Olhos de Água. It has a population of 3,221 (2001) and an area of 15.69 km^{2}. The name (literally: "eyes of water") refers to the fresh water springs on the beach, visible when the sea is on low tide.
