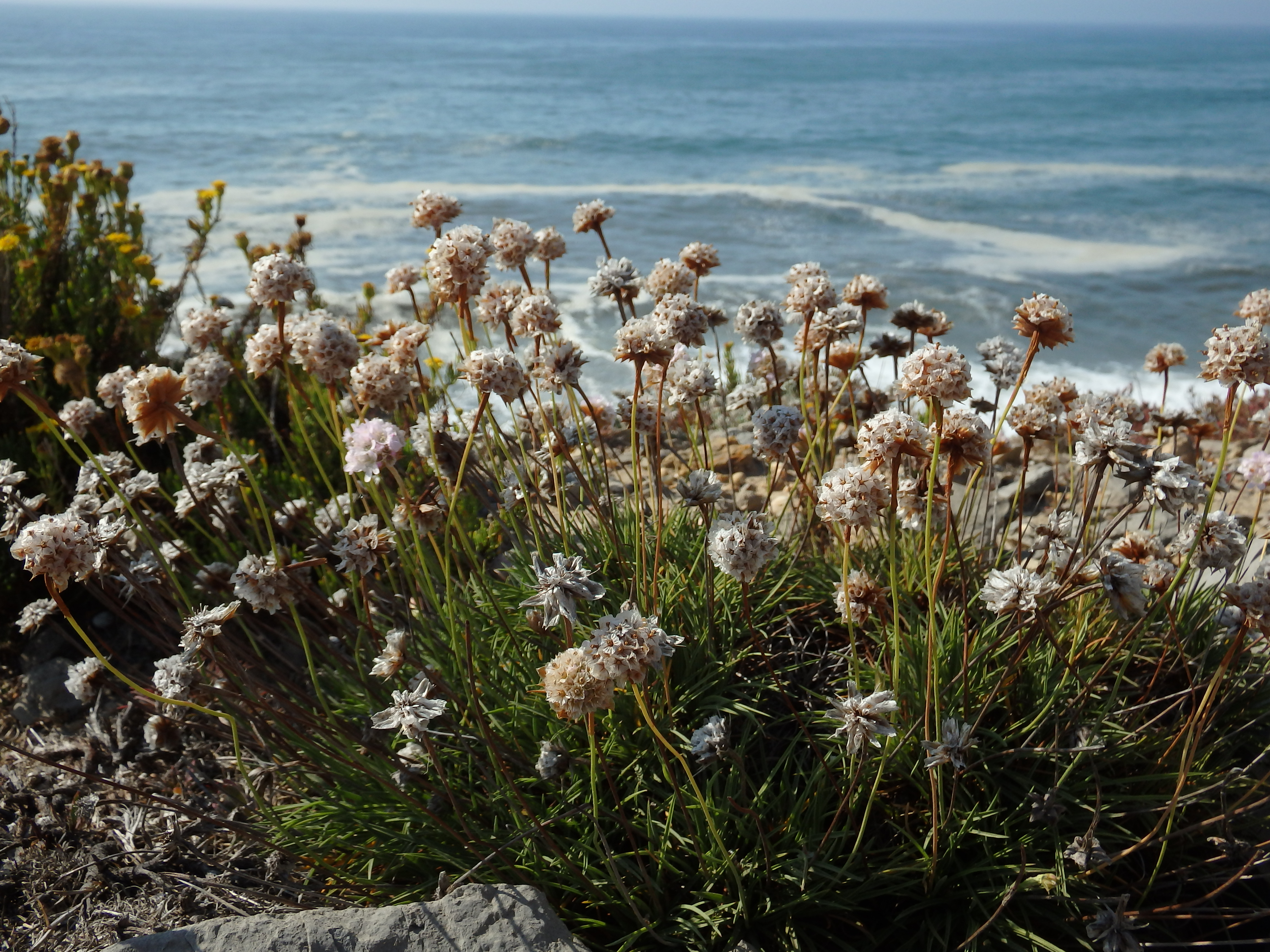
- Armeria welwitschii on Cabo Mondego

Scientific classification
- Kingdom: Plantae
- Clade: Tracheophytes
- Clade: Angiosperms
- Clade: Eudicots
- Order: Caryophyllales
- Family: Plumbaginaceae
- Genus: Armeria
- Species: A. welwitschii

Binomial name
- Armeria welwitschii Boiss.

Synonyms
- Armeria platyphylla (Daveau) Franco; Statice welwitschii (Boiss.) Samp.; Armeria welwitschii var. diversifolia Franco; Armeria cinerea Boiss. & Welw.; Armeria welwitschii var. cinerea (Boiss. & Welw.) Govaerts; Armeria welwitschii var. platyphylla Daveau; Armeria littoralis Boiss.; Statice armeria Brot.

= Armeria welwitschii =

Species of plant

Armeria welwitschii is a species of flowering plant in the thrift family (Plumbaginaceae), endemic to central coastal Portugal. It is often cultivated as an ornamental in rock gardens.

== Description ==
Armeria welwitschii is a perennial evergreen subshrub up to 50 cm (20 in) in height. It has numerous aerial branches, covered with dry leaves. It has lanceolate leaves that reach up to 10 cm (3.9 in) long by 0.7 cm (0.28 in) wide. Its pods are reddish, scapes are 7–30 cm (2.8–11.8 in) long and sometimes pubescent. The flower calyx is 7–10 mm (0.28–0.39 in) and has pink to white, sometimes purple flower petals. 2n=18; n=9. It flowers between February and May.

== Distribution and habitat ==
Armeria welwitschii grows in sand dunes and coastal cliffs on sandy or rocky soils from Cabo Mondego south to Cascais in central coastal Portugal. It lives in frost-free Mediterranean climates in its native habitat but can tolerate USDA hardiness zone 6.

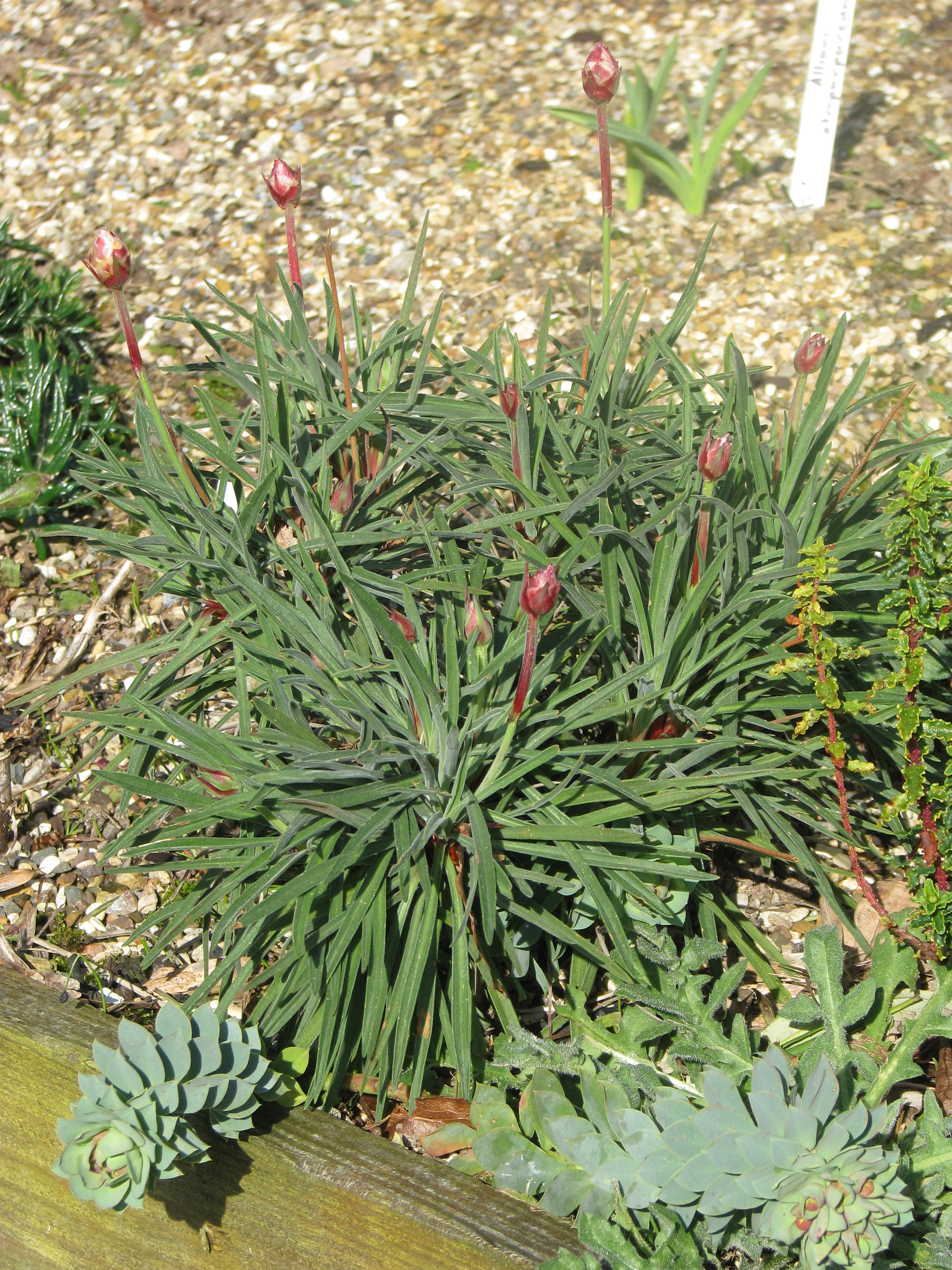

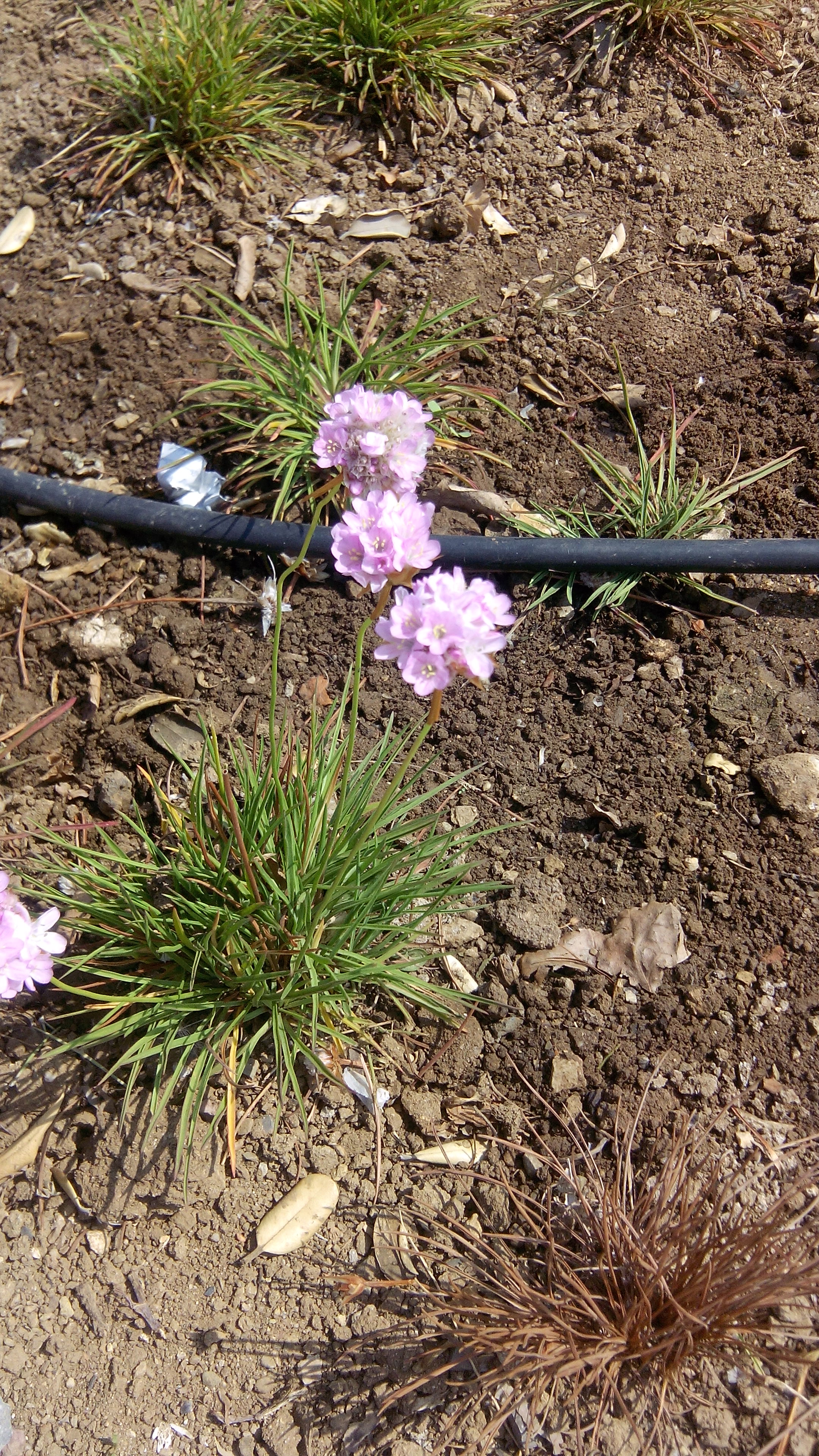

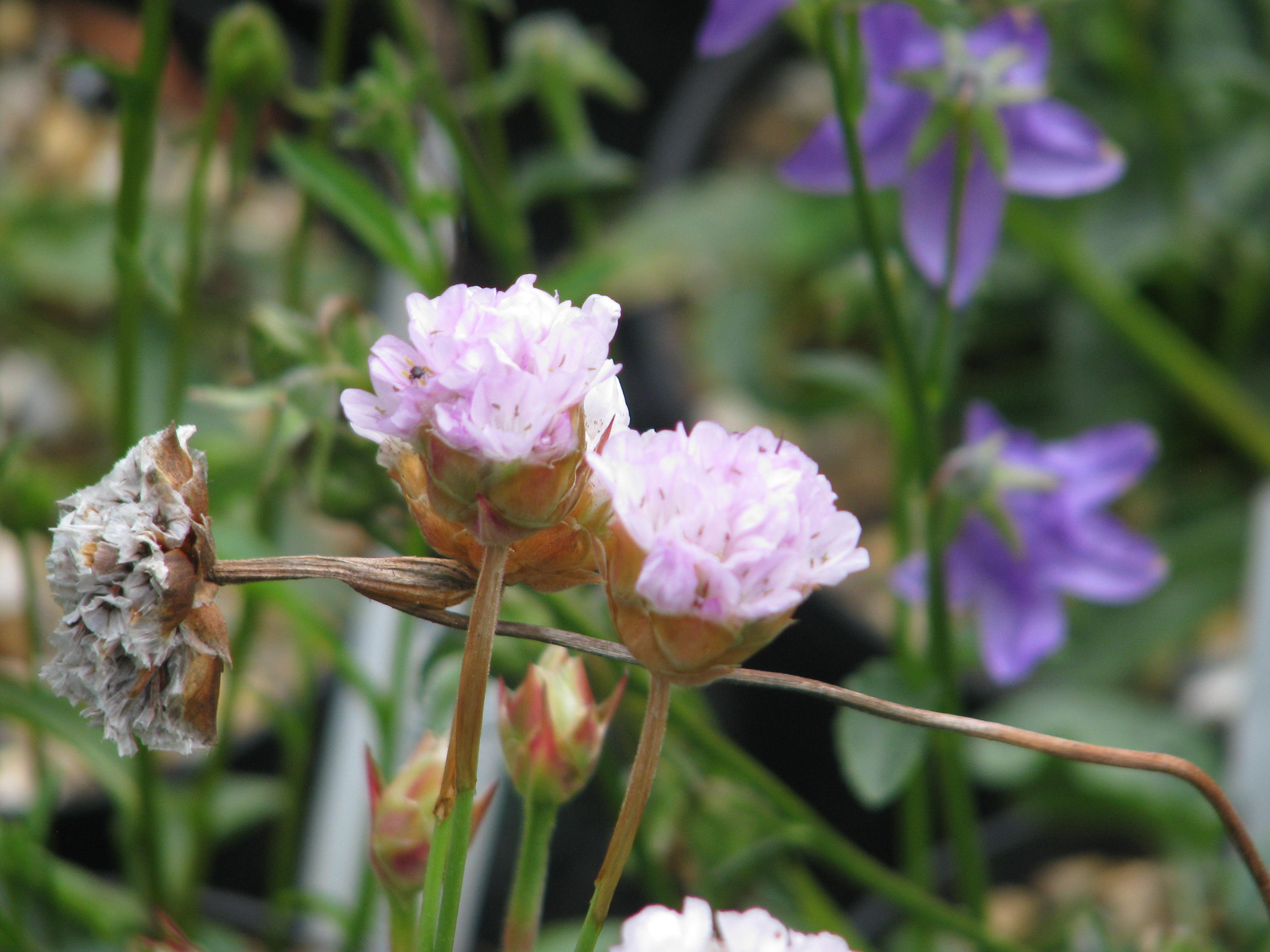
