= Daveau =

Daveau is a surname. Notable people with the surname include:

- Jules Alexandre Daveau (1852–1929), French botanist
- Suzanne Daveau (born 1925), Franco-Portuguese researcher
