= Albufeira =

- Municipality
- City of Albufeira
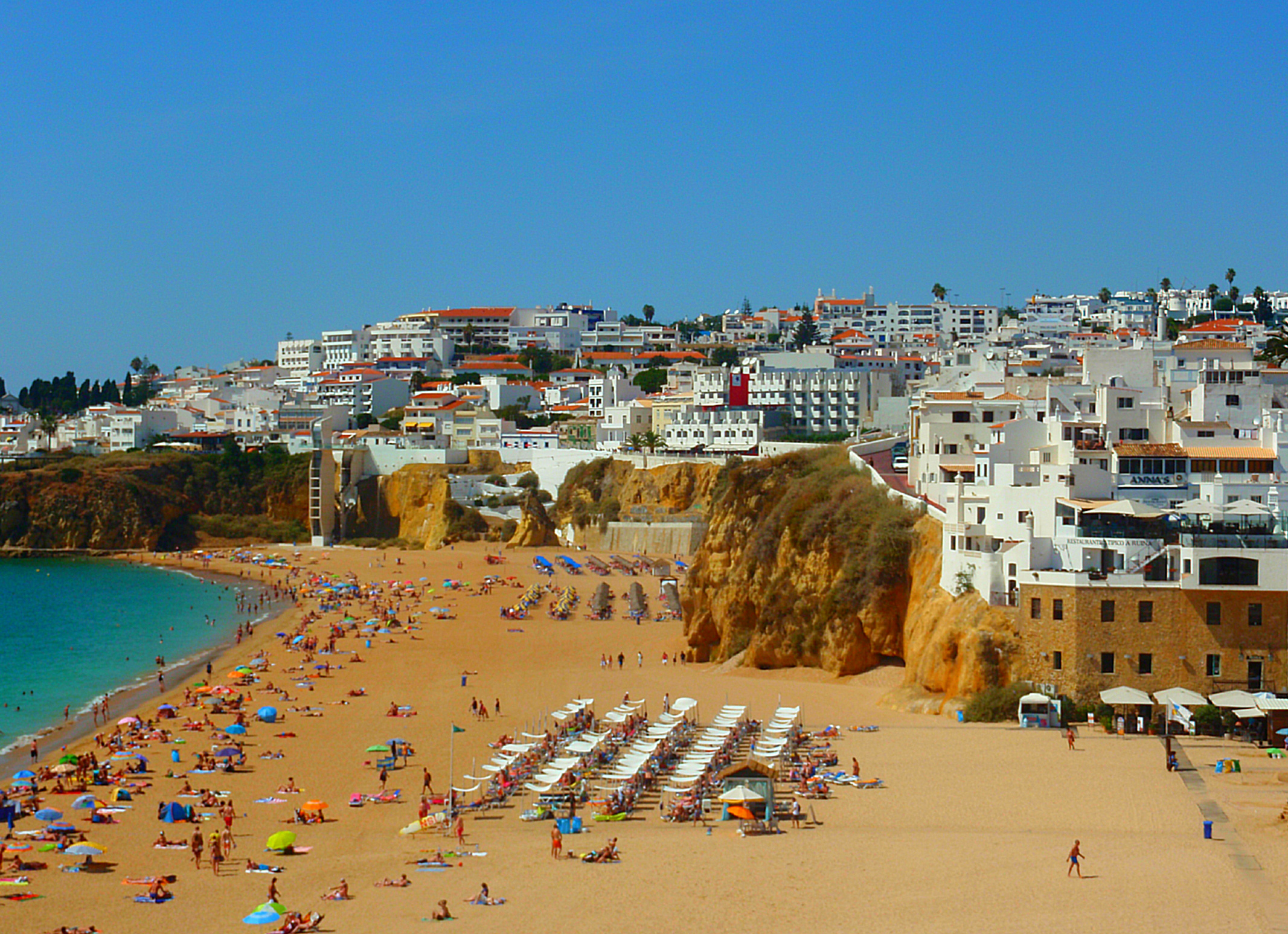
- The city of Albufeira with the Fishermen's Beach

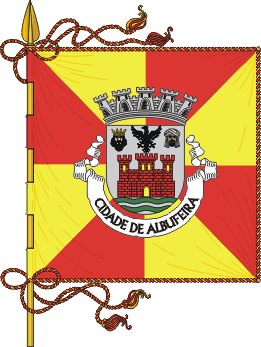
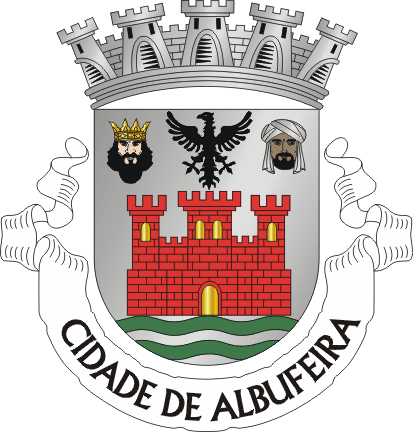
- Flag Coat of arms
- Interactive map of Albufeira
- Location in Portugal
- Coordinates: 37°5′23″N 8°14′45″W
- Country: Portugal
- Region: Algarve
- Intermunic. comm.: Algarve
- District: Faro
- Parishes: 4

Government
  - President: Rui Cristina (CH)

Area
  - Total: 140.66 km^{2} (54.31 sq mi)
- Lowest elevation: 0 m (0 ft)

Population (2021)
  - Total: 44,158
  - Density: 313.93/km^{2} (813.09/sq mi)
- Time zone: UTC+00:00 (WET)
  - Summer (DST): UTC+01:00 (WEST)
- Postal code: 8200
- Area code: 289
- Patron: Nossa Senhora da Conceição
- Website: cm-albufeira.pt

Albufeira (pronounced [alβuˈfɐjɾɐ], locally [aɫbʷˈfeɾɐ, aɫbˈfeɾɐ]), officially the City of Albufeira (Portuguese: Cidade de Albufeira), is a city and municipality of Faro District in the Algarve region of southern Portugal. The population in 2021 was 44,158, in an area of 140.66 square kilometres (54.31 square miles). The city proper had a population of 28,645 in 2021.

A tourist destination due to its coastal conditions, Albufeira's population expands to around 300,000 in the summer and at Christmas and New Year owing to the number of hotels that includes marina facilities, golf courses, restaurants and bars.

== History ==
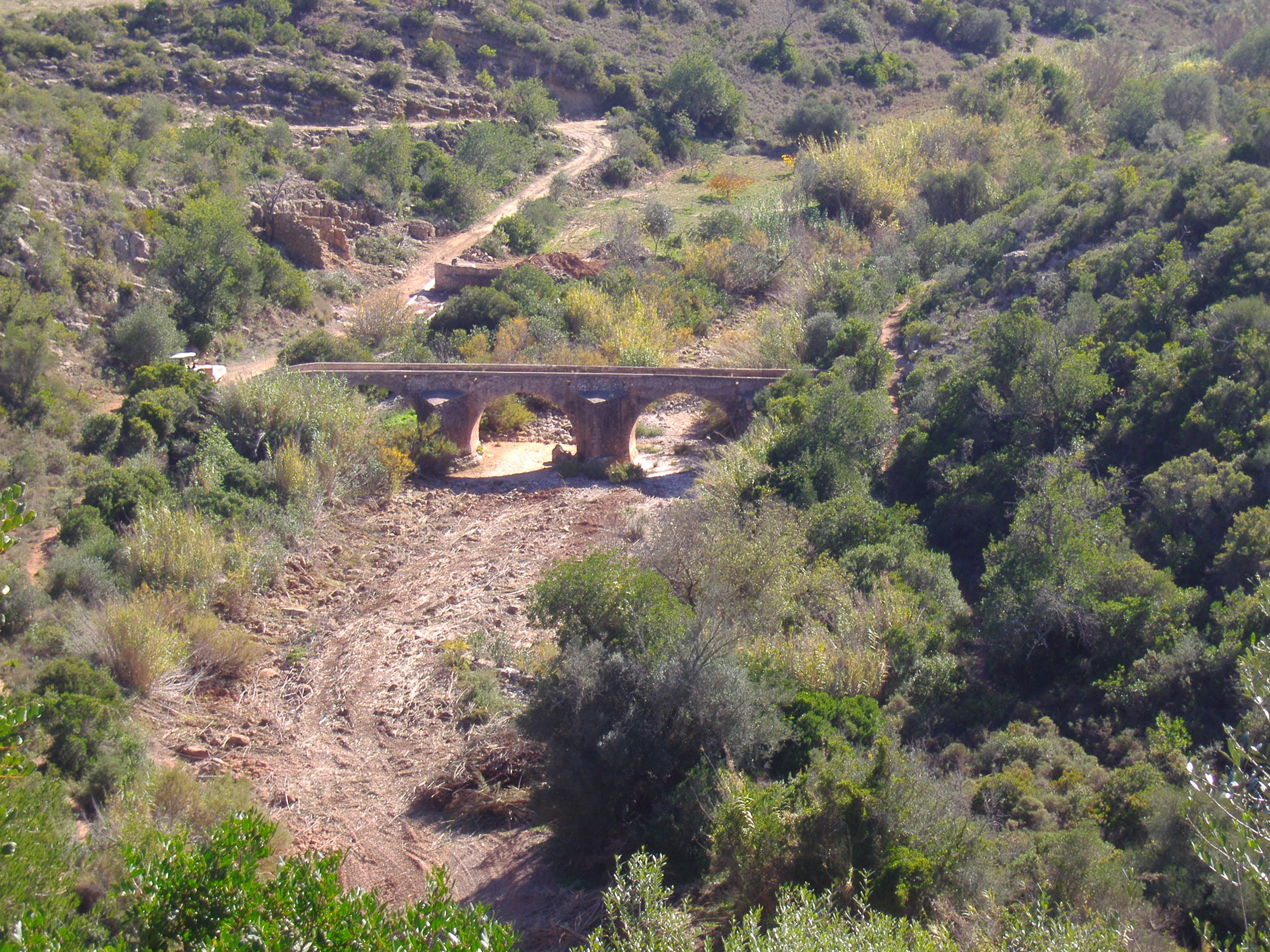
The medieval Bridge of Paderne, rebuilt in 1771

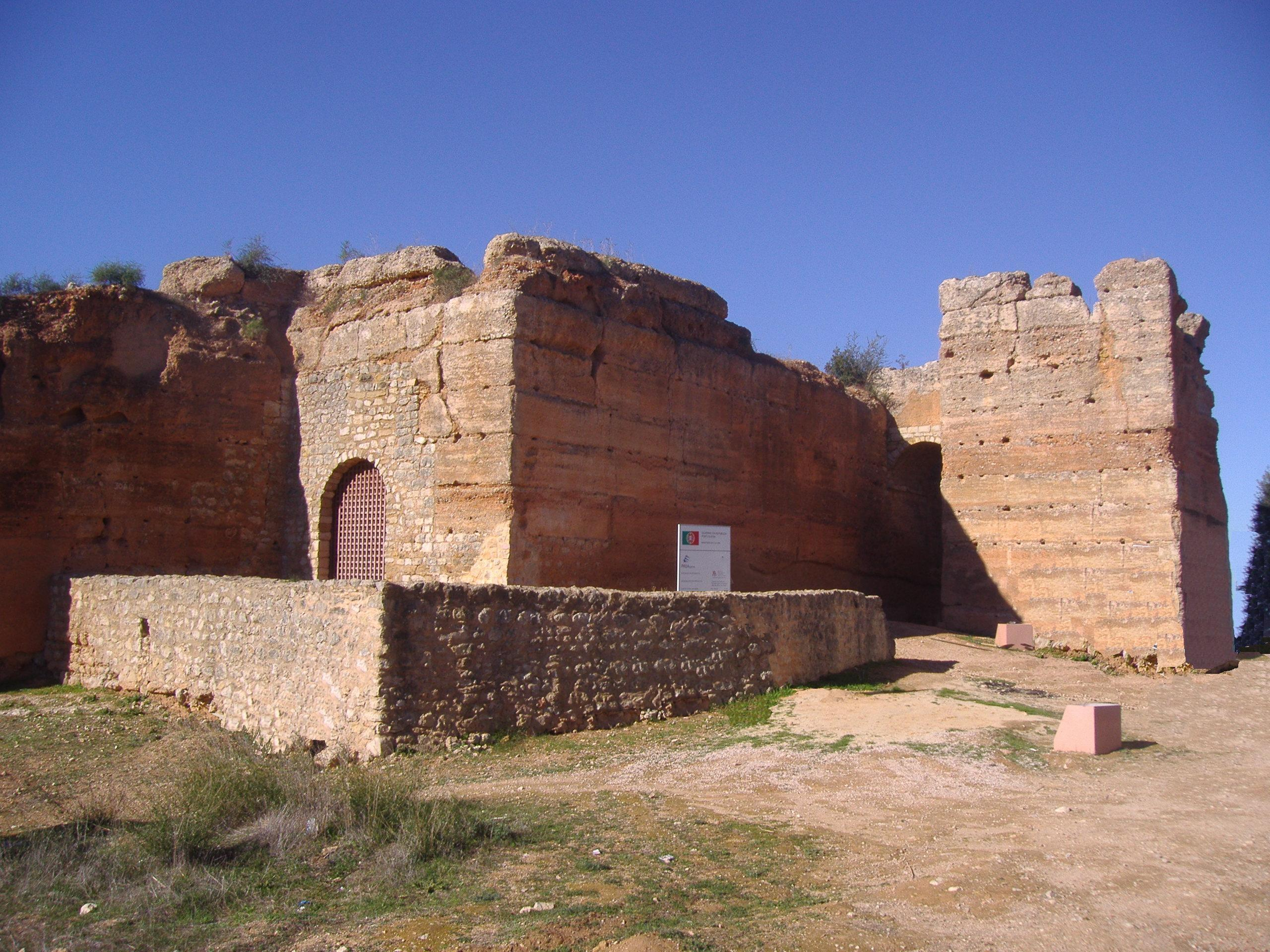
The massive walls of the remains of the Castle of Paderne, a Moorish castle constructed in the period before the Portuguese Reconquista

It is unclear when the first settlements specifically formed in the region of Albufeira, although scientific research suggests origins during the pre-historic epoch, and that the town of Albufeira formed as an out-port of the maritime fishery. The primitive settlement was occupied by the Romans, who named it Baltum, introducing a centralized administrative structure and developing intense agricultural activities along with commerce. The Romans constructed aqueducts, roads and bridges, of which parts still remain.

After the fall of the Roman Empire, the region was ruled by Germanic peoples like the Visigoths. In the early 8th century, it was conquered by invading Muslims from northern Africa. The modern name originated from the Arabic word al-Buħayra (البحيرة), for the lagoon, in reference to the lagoon that formed in the lowlands.

The Moors constructed strong defensive structures, making the area almost impregnable, allowing this area to remain in the hands of their forces longer than other possessions in Portugal. The development of agriculture during this period was notable, with the introduction of new techniques and plant species. The Moors used the plow, fertilizers, and winches for lifting water from the wells, introducing the irrigation of fields, constructing dams and transforming uncultivated areas into gardens and orchards.

=== Middle Ages ===
The Christian conquest of the region began at the end of the 12th century. When Afonso III of Portugal occupied the throne, most of the Algarve had already fallen into the hands of the Christians. Templar and Hospitaller Knights, military and religious orders that supported the Reconquista, assaulted many of the lands occupied by the Arabs, but were never successful in taking Albufeira. It was following the capture of Faro that the siege of Albufeira became unsupportable. Encircled by enemy forces on all sides, it fell in 1249 to the forces of Afonso III, who donated the lands to the Order of Aviz in 1250.

The Moors were persecuted terribly by the victorious army, which chased the remaining forces into a cavern, known today as Cova do Xorino, situated near the southern limits of the old city. The town became part of the kingdom of Portugal and the Algarves. King D. Manuel I awarded a Charter (foral) to the Town of Albufeira on 20 August 1504. From that day, the town was governed under standard national laws.

=== 18th and 19th centuries ===
The taking of Albufeira on 26 July 1833, by Remexido's guerrilla forces, is an example of the slaughter and looting perpetrated by the antiliberal absolutist faction under the leadership of Remexido during and well after the Liberal Wars.

Albufeira was one of the towns of the Algarve most affected by natural calamities. The 1755 Lisbon earthquake caused the worst damage. The sea invaded the town with 10 metres (33 ft) waves, destroying almost all the buildings along the coast. In the town proper, only 27 residential buildings survived the natural disaster, but in states of ruin. The parochial church, an old mosque adapted by the Christians, where many of the residents sought refuge during the cataclysm, collapsed causing 227 deaths. The Algarve continued to experience aftershocks, until 20 August of the following year, which hindered the reconstruction under the Bishop D. Francisco Gomes de Avelar.

In 1833, during the Liberal Wars between absolutist and liberal forces, Albufeira was encircled and attacked by Remexido's soldiers: an anti-liberal, absolutist leader who was as popular as feared and damaged the village's buildings, having executed many of its inhabitants. After the 19th century, the community grew through the expansion of the fishery. This is why the locals annually celebrate 'Festival de Peixes', which has been tradition and serves to honor the fisheries in Albufeira that helped with the growth of the city.

=== 20th century ===
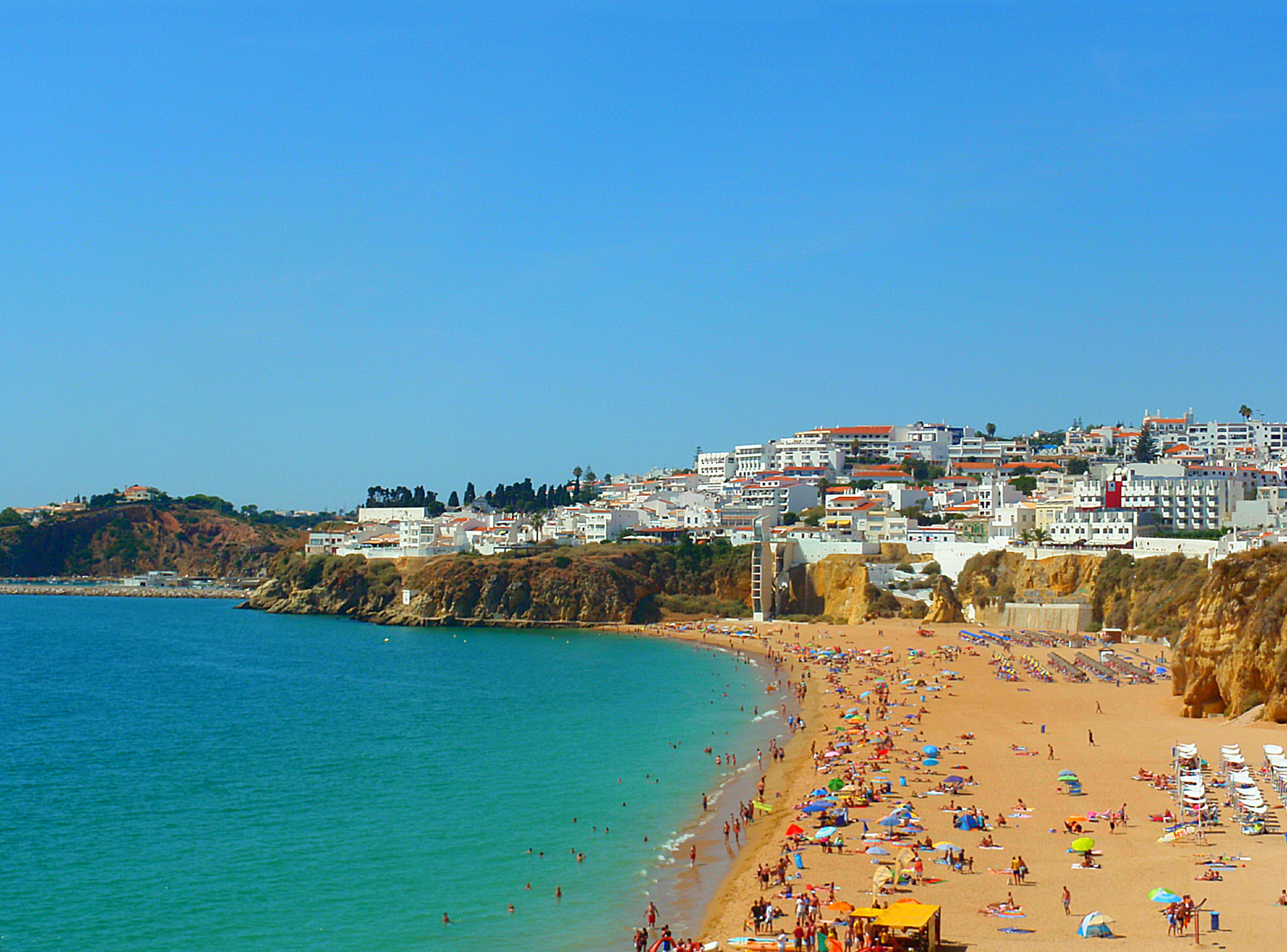
Albufeira's beach

In the first decades of the 20th century, the export of fish and nuts were central to the local economy. The town had five factories employing 700-800 people, mostly wives of fishermen working in local production. Between 1930 and 1960, there was a considerable decline in fortunes, resulting in the closing of many of these factories, the reduction in fishing boats along the coast and the abandonment of many of the homes. The population was reduced by half, and the fishing industry became a subsistence activity, supporting local consumption only.

The town started to become a hub for tourism in the 1960s, and has grown to accommodate this since, growing out into the surrounding hills to accommodate thousands of the 5 million tourists who visit the Algarve region each year.

== Governance ==
The municipality of Albufeira is governed by the Câmara municipal of Albufeira. During the 2021 municipal election, sitting mayor José Carlos Rolo (PPD/PSD) has been reinstated with 32,04% of the votes.

== Geography ==
Since 2013, Albufeira is divided into four freguesias (civil parishes):

- Albufeira e Olhos de Água
- Ferreiras
- Guia
- Paderne

=== Destinations from Albufeira ===
It is 250 kilometres (160 mi) from Lisbon, close to Paderne Castle. Lagoa is 30 kilometres (19 mi) to the west, and Faro 45 kilometres (28 mi) to the southeast.

=== International relations ===
Albufeira is twinned with:

Dunfermline, Fife, Scotland, United Kingdom, since May 1995.

=== Climate ===
Climate data for Albufeira (12m amsl)
Month	Jan	Feb	Mar	Apr	May	Jun	Jul	Aug	Sep	Oct	Nov	Dec	Year
Mean daily maximum °C (°F)	16.2 (61.2)	17.0 (62.6)	19.0 (66.2)	20.7 (69.3)	23.1 (73.6)	26.7 (80.1)	29.1 (84.4)	28.5 (83.3)	26.0 (78.8)	23.2 (73.8)	19.4 (66.9)	16.9 (62.4)	22.2 (71.9)
Average rainfall mm (inches)	60 (2.4)	47 (1.9)	46 (1.8)	38 (1.5)	27 (1.1)	3 (0.1)	1 (0.0)	4 (0.2)	26 (1.0)	56 (2.2)	81 (3.2)	96 (3.8)	485 (19.2)
Average relative humidity (%)	76	75	72	69	66	63	57	62	68	73	74	77	69
Mean monthly sunshine hours	186.0	169.5	217.0	240.0	279.0	330.0	372.0	341.0	270.0	217.0	180.0	155.0	2,956.5
Source: Met Office

== Economy ==
Tourism and commerce are the main activities in Albufeira. Most tourists arrive via Faro Airport.

=== Tourism ===
In 2025, Albufeira was the second most popular tourist destination in Portugal by number of overnight stays, and the most popular in the Algarve region.

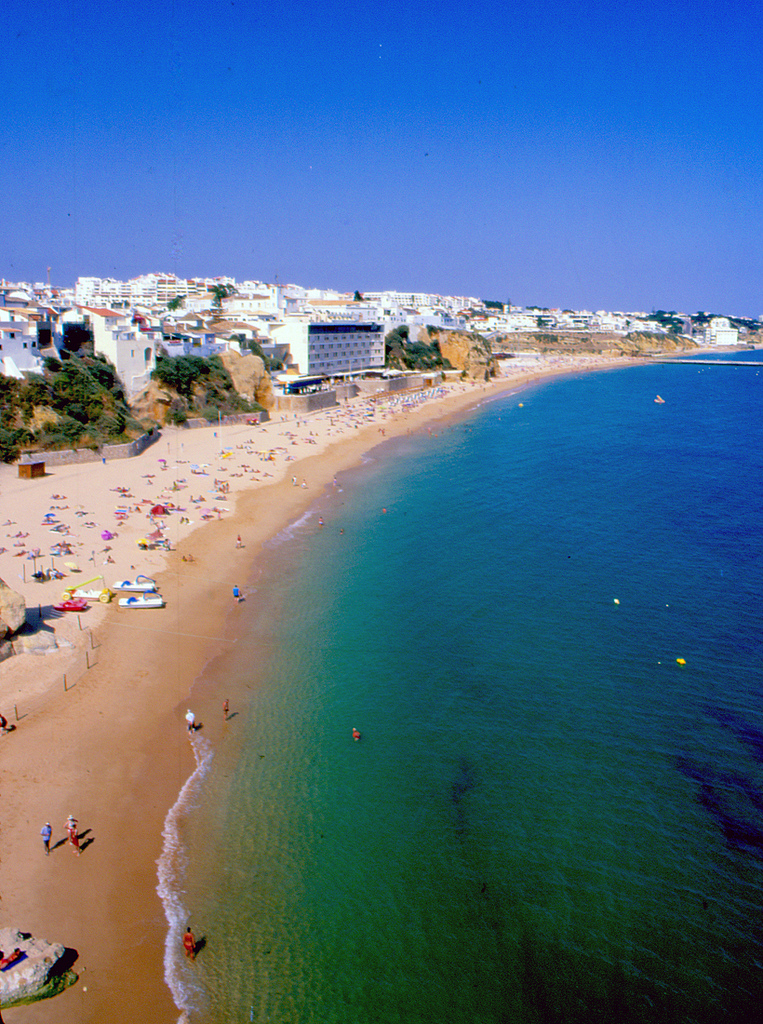
The beach in Albufeira

The tourist areas are divided into two main areas, Areias de São João, known colloquially as The Strip, and the Old Town. The Strip's main street is Avenida Francisco Sá Carneiro which is full of bars, restaurants and open-air discothèques.

== Culture ==
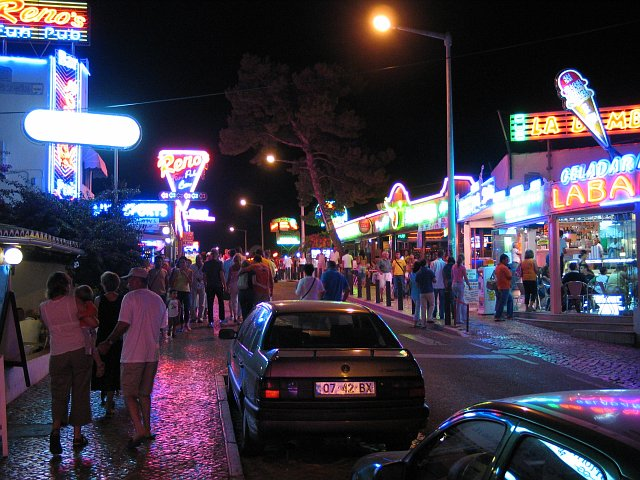
Nightlife in Albufeira

A local culinary specialty is a rich steamed stew dish of local shellfish, traditionally referred to as Cataplana, named for the cookware used in its preparation, which is a well-known dish from the Algarve. Similarly, the Caldeirada, or fish stew, and the simple grilled sardines, are popular examples of the traditional dishes, typical of Portugal's coastal areas.

== Landmarks ==
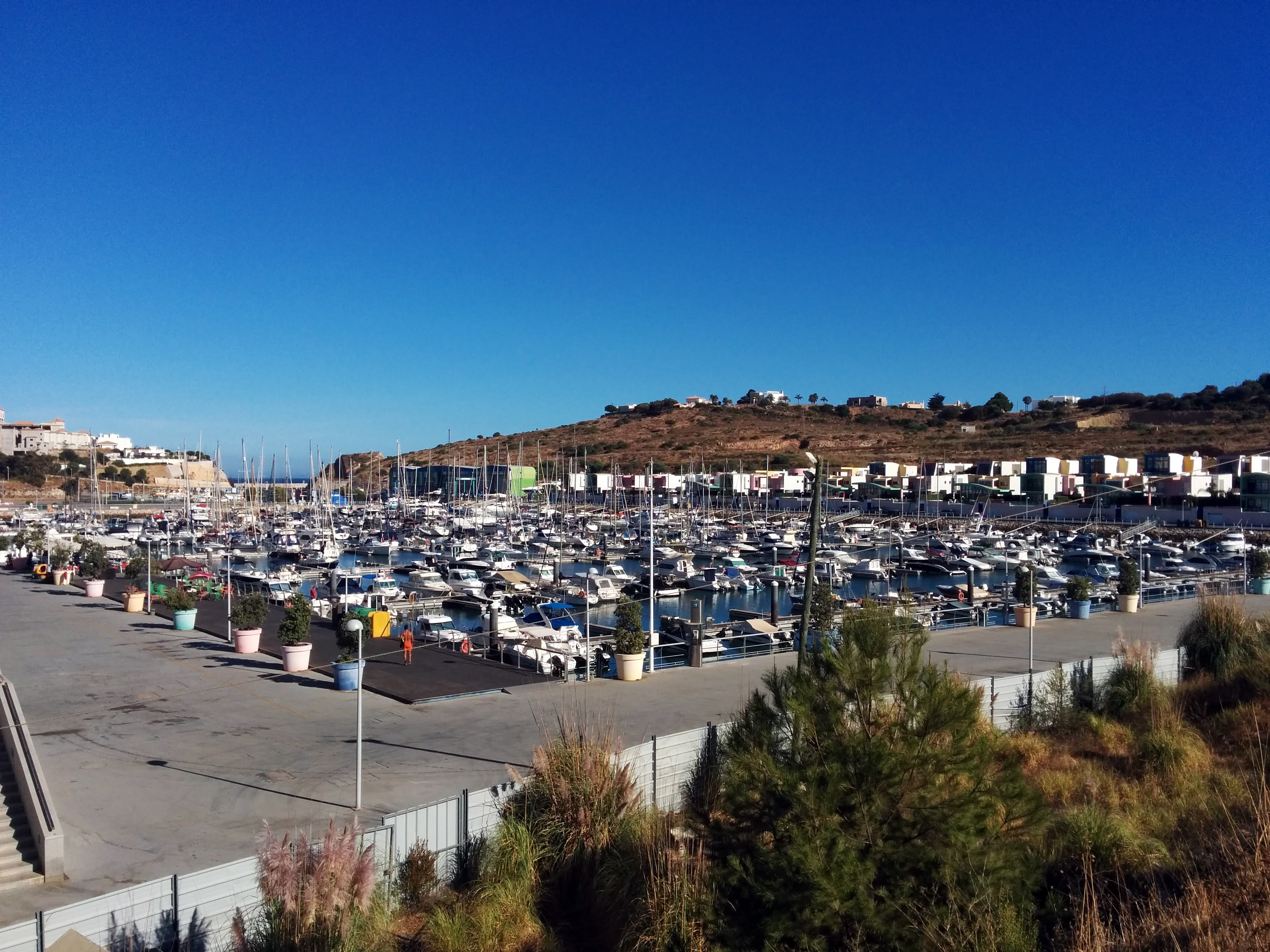
Albufeira marina facing south east

The architecture of the region is an eclectic mix of typical Portuguese Algarvean pale white and tiled residential homes, along narrow streets, intermixed with modern tourist developments. This can be seen in the design of many buildings in the area. In addition, the municipality is dotted with rich historical and architectural landmarks, such as the following:

=== Civic ===
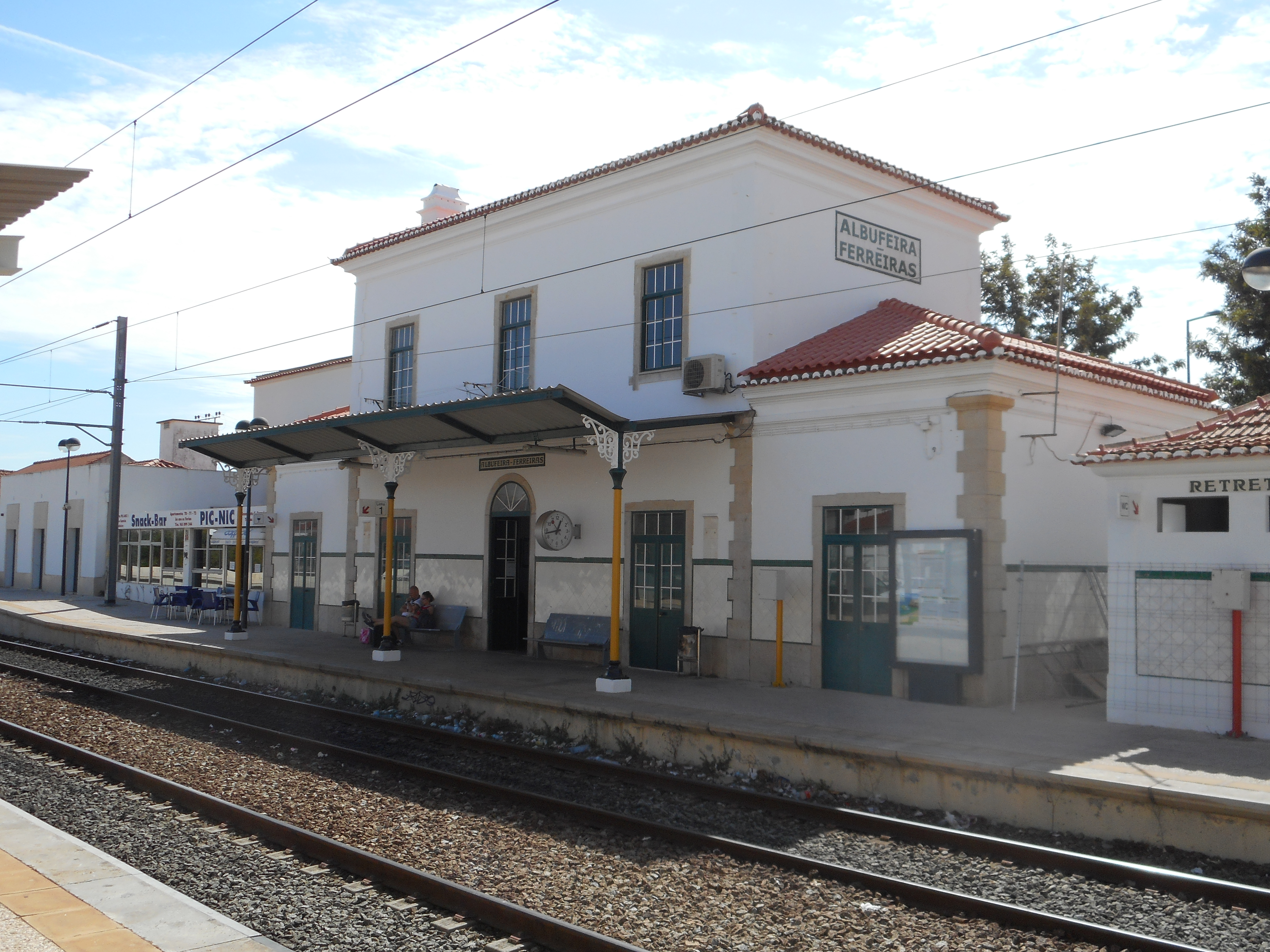
The 19th century railway station of Albufeira-Ferreiras

- Albufeira-Ferreiras Railway Station (Portuguese: Estação Ferroviária de Albufeira-Ferreiras), the iconic station was originally identified in 1918 pamphlet, as part of the Terreiro do Paço-Barreiro route. After November 1926, faster locomotives began to serve this line, while in 1938, the Empresa de Viação do Algarve began regular service between Albufeira and Ferreiras.
- Bridge of Paderne (Portuguese: Ponte de Paderne)
- Cine-Theatre of Albufeira (Portuguese: Cine-Teatro de Albufeira/Discoteca Silver Screen)
- Electrical Station of Albufeira (Portuguese: Central Eléctrica de Albufeira/Galeria de Arte Pintor Samora Barros)
- Fiscal Guard Post of Albufeira (Portuguese: Ponte de Paderne)
- Fountain of Paderne (Portuguese: Fonte em Paderne)
- Judicial Courthouse of Albufeira (Portuguese: Tribunal Judicial de Albufeira)
- Lighthouse of Albufeira (Portuguese: Farol de Albufeira)
- Hospital of the Santa Casa da Misericórdia of Albufeira (Portuguese: Edifício, Igreja e Hospital da Santa Casa da Misericórdia de Albufeira)
- Hotel of Balaia (Portuguese: Hotel da Balaia/Club Med Balaia)
- Municipal Palace/Hall of Albufeira (Portuguese: Câmara Municipal de Albufeira/Museu Municipal de Arqueologia)
- Postal, Telegraph & Telephones (CTT) of Albufeira (Portuguese: Edifício dos Correios, Telégrafos e Telefones, CTT, de Albufeira)
- Residence of Paderne (Portuguese: Moradia em Mem Moniz/Casa de Paderne)
- Tower Clock (Portuguese: Torre do Relogio), situated on Rua Bernardino de Sousa, it is considered by the city of Albufeira as its ex-libris; constructed in the 19th century, it consists of a tower with a crown of iron, representing a belfry tower, with its solitary bell hung from its structure. It is a functioning belltower and illuminated normally during feast days and religious celebrations.
- Watermill of Paderne (Portuguese: Azenha em Paderne/Moinho de Água em Paderne)

=== Military ===
- Battery of Albufeira (Portuguese: Bateria de Albufeira)
- Castle of Albufeira (Portuguese: Castelo de Albufeira/Castelo e cerca urbana de Albufeira)
- Castle of Paderne (Portuguese: Castelo de Paderne), came to be situated on the remnants of an ancient Calcolithic or even Neolithic settlement that was adapted by the Romans as an outpost overlooking the roads between settlements. Following the 713 capture of the emplacement, the Almohads built the Castle to enforce their occupation, in a series of fortifications that included Silves, Loulé and Faro.
- Tower of Guia (Portuguese: Torre Velho)
- Tower of Medronheira (Portuguese: Torre da Medronheira), constructed during the reign of King John III of Portugal, this lookout served to announce the approach of ships and/or attacks by pirates or privateers.

=== Religious ===
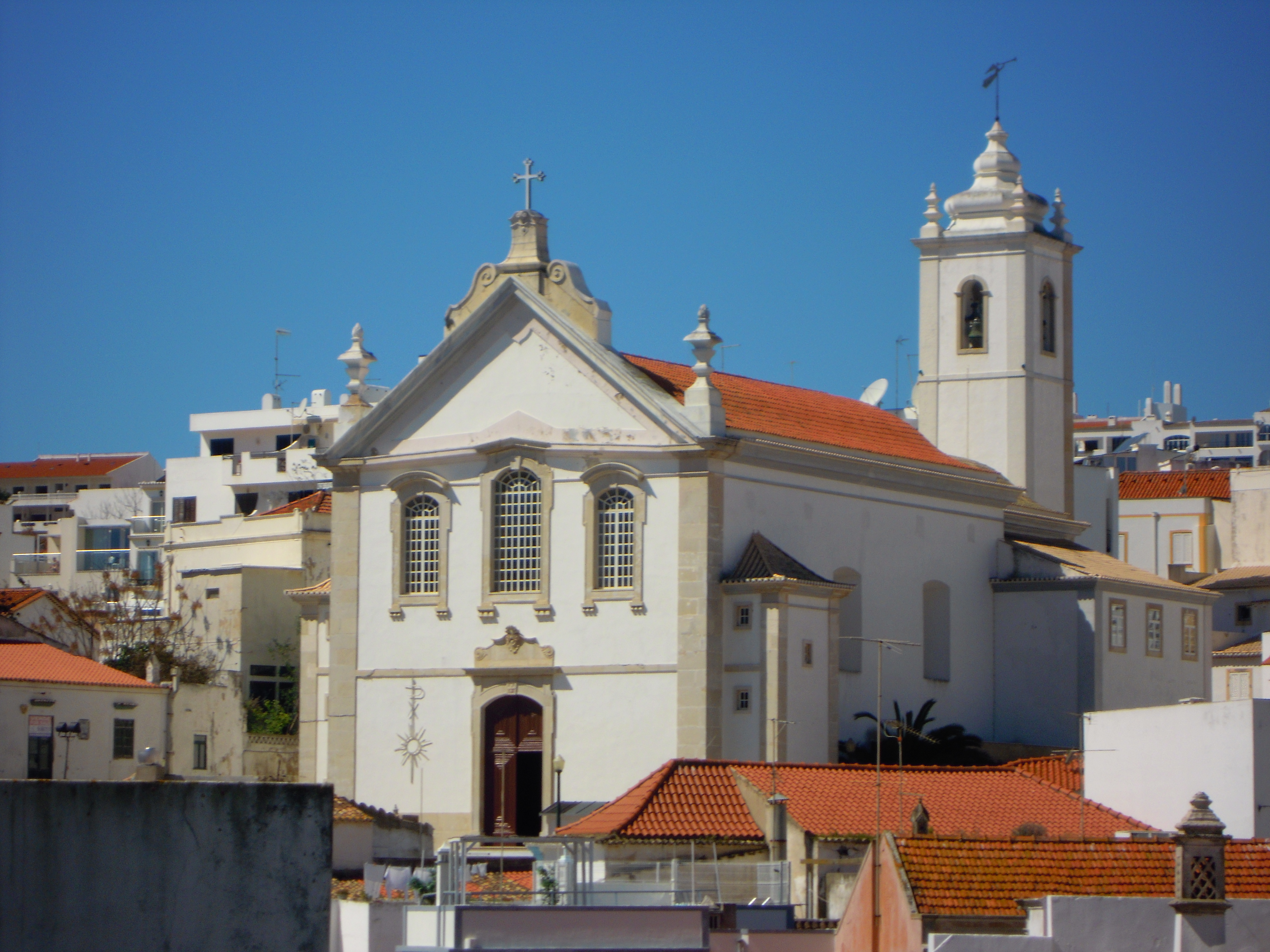
The two-story tall parochial church of Albufeira dedicated to Nossa Senhora da Conceição

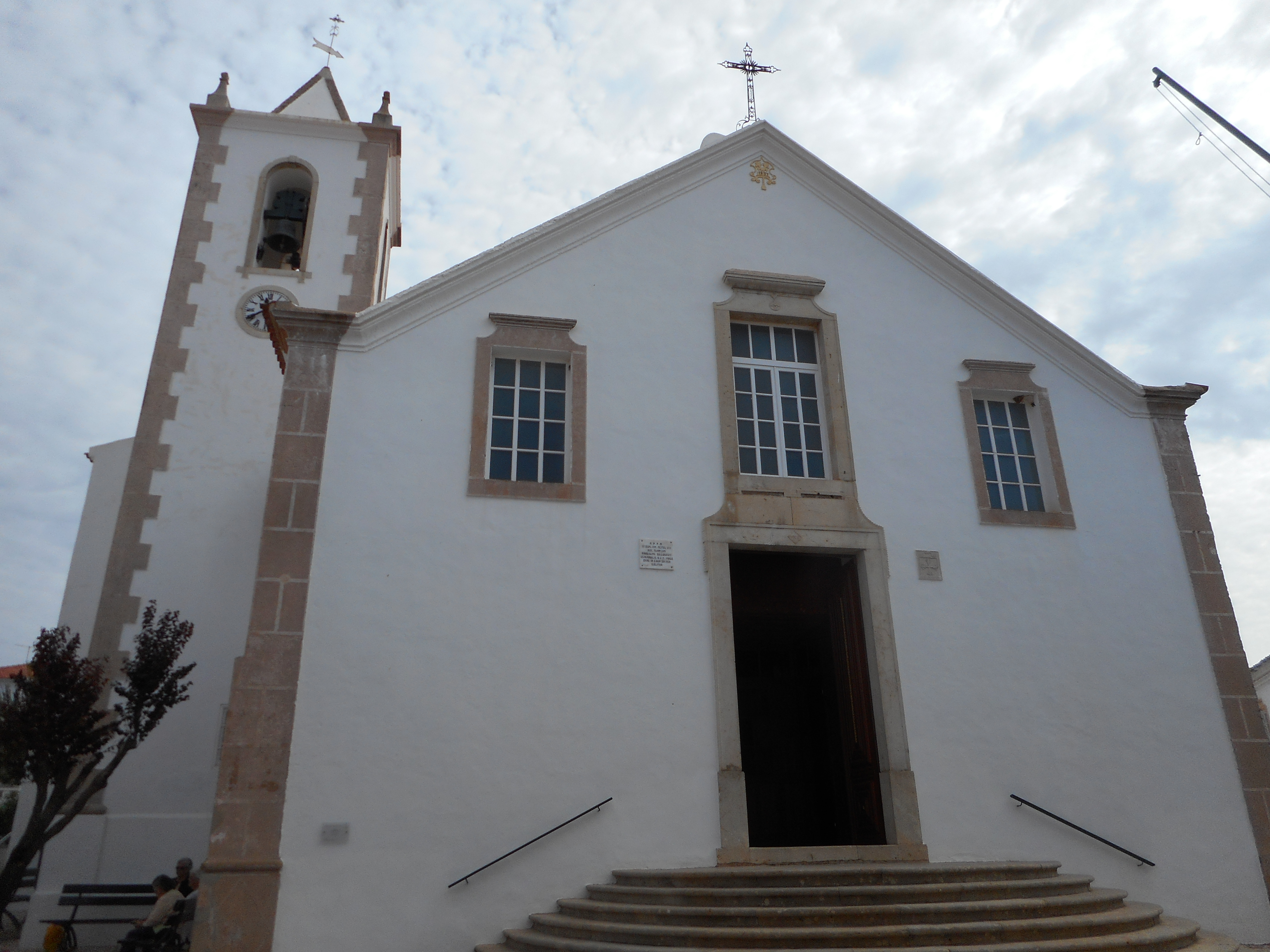
The front façade of the Church of Nossa Senhora da Esperança

- Church of Nossa Senhora da Conceição (Portuguese: Igreja Matriz de Albufeira/Igreja de Nossa Senhora da Conceição), situated on Rua da Igreja Nova it dates from the 18th century (1782) and was consecrated on 15 July 1800 by the Bishop of the Algarve (then D. Francisco Gomes de Avelar), to replace the old parochial church destroyed in 1755. The destroyed church building was a converted former mosque. The Neoclassic church, consisting of single nave, four lateral chapels, baptismal chapel, choir, two pulpits and lateral halls, is dedicated to Bishop São Luís, Our Lady of Fátima and the Sacred Heart of Jesus. Highlighting this temple is a painting by Albufeirense Samora Barros that emblazons the altar, and serves as the base for the image of Our Lady of the Conception, patron saint of Albufeira. Above the principal triumphal arch is the Cross of Aviz, from the religious-military order, that Albufeira was associated with at the foundation of Portugal.
- Church of Nossa Senhora da Guia (Portuguese: Igreja Paroquial da Guia/Igreja de Nossa Senhora da Visitação), commonly referred as the Church of Our Lady of the Guide or Our Lady of the Visitation, the parochial church of Guia is a 17th-century building, noted for an 18th-century image of Our Lady of the Visitation, Saint Anthony of Padua, and Crucified Christ, from the same period, in addition to images of Nossa Senhora do Rosário (Our Lady of the Rosary) and Nossa Senhora das Dores (Our Lady of Sorrows), from the 18th century, in addition to azulejo tile that fills the footers of the body of the church.
- Church of Nossa Senhora da Visitação (Portuguese: Igreja Paroquial da Guia/Igreja de Nossa Senhora da Visitação)
- Church of Santa Ana (Portuguese: Igreja de Santa Ana)
- Church of São Sebastião (Portuguese: Igreja de São Sebastião)
- Church of São Sebastião da Guia (Portuguese: Igreja de São Sebastião)
- Church of Senhora da Esperança (Portuguese: Igreja Paroquial de Paderne/Igreja da Senhora da Esperança)
- Hermitage of Nossa Senhora da Guia (Portuguese: Ermida de Nossa Senhora da Guia), dating from the 16th century, this structure was damaged by the earthquake of 1755, rebuilt in the first quarter of the 18th century, when the gilded retable was installed. An important work of the Baroque in the Algarve, it has a simple interior with polychromatic azulejo tile and image of the patron saint dating from the 17th century.
- Hermitage of Nossa Senhora do Pé da Cruz (Portuguese: Ermida de Nossa Senhora do Pé da Cruz)
- Hermitage of Nossa Senhora da Orada (Portuguese: Ermida Nossa Senhora da Orada)
- Hermitage of São Sebastião (Portuguese: Igreja de São Sebastião/Ermida de São Sebastião), built around the 16th century, or early 17th century, it was greatly damaged by the 1755 earthquake, yet was completely restored in three months time. Dedicated to Saint Sebastian (since he was the legendary saint responsible for the disappearance of the Black Plague), a 17th-century, wood image of the saint (which was initially housed in this hermitage) is located in the sacristy of the parochial church of Guia.

== Sport ==
The main local football and basketball teams are those of Imortal DC. Several regular football tournaments are played in the Algarve, notably the Algarve Cup. Also, many British teams spend the summer in Albufeira for pre-season training sessions, participating in friendly games, including Sunderland, Ipswich Town, Aston Villa, Fulham, Sheffield Wednesday, Oxford United and Brentford.

The city plays host to the Almond Blossom Cross Country competition annually. Established in 1977, the event attracts international-calibre runners, boosting this sport and tourism to the area.

== Notable people ==
- Bonnie Tyler (1951-2026), Welsh singer, who lived in Albufeira from 1988 until 2026.
- Daniel Gonçalves (born 1982), football coach and assistant manager of Primeira Liga side Boavista
- Filipa Sousa (born 1985), singer who represented Portugal at the Eurovision Song Contest 2012
