= List of Acantholimon species =

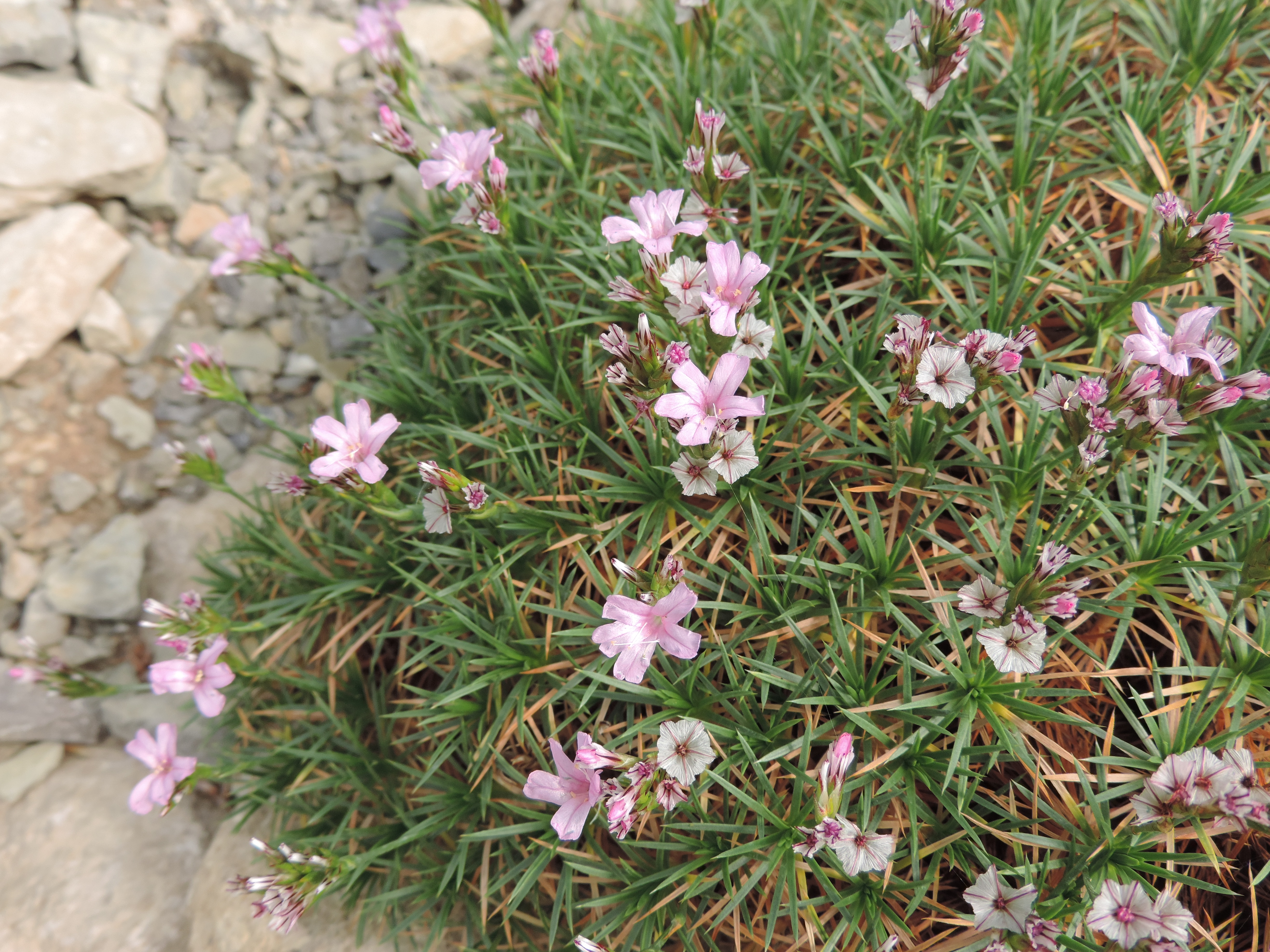
Acantholimon ulicinum

Acantholimon (prickly thrift) is a genus of flowering plants in the family Plumbaginaceae. They are native to southeastern Europe and western and central Asia.

According to Plants of the World Online, the genus has 321 accepted species.

== A ==
- Acantholimon acanthobryum Rech.f. & Schiman-Czeika
- Acantholimon acerosum (Willd.) Boiss.
- Acantholimon acmostegium Boiss. & Buhse
- Acantholimon aegaeum F.W.Mey.
- Acantholimon afanassievii Lincz.
- Acantholimon agropyroideum Mobayen
- Acantholimon ahangarense Rech.f. & Schiman-Czeika
- Acantholimon akaydinii Özüdoğru
- Acantholimon alaicum Czerniak.
- Acantholimon alatavicum Bunge
- Acantholimon alavae Rech.f. & Schiman-Czeika
- Acantholimon albanicum O.Schwarz & F.Mey.
- Acantholimon alberti Regel
- Acantholimon albocalycinum Assadi & Mirtadz.
- Acantholimon alexandri Fed.
- Acantholimon alexeenkoanum Czerniak. ex Ikonn.
- Acantholimon amoenum Rech.f. & Schiman-Czeika
- Acantholimon anatolicum Yıld.
- Acantholimon androsaceum (Jaub. & Spach) Boiss.
- Acantholimon anisophyllum Rech.f. & Schiman-Czeika
- Acantholimon annae Lincz.
- Acantholimon antilibanoticum Mouterde
- Acantholimon anzobicum Lincz.
- Acantholimon araxanum Bunge
- Acantholimon argyrostachyum Rech.f. & Schiman-Czeika
- Acantholimon aristulatum Bunge
- Acantholimon armenum Boiss. & A.Huet
- Acantholimon artosense Doğan & Akaydın
- Acantholimon arundoscapum Mobayen
- Acantholimon aspadanum Bunge
- Acantholimon asphodelinum Mobayen
- Acantholimon assadii Mirtadz. & Bordbar
- Acantholimon astragalinum Mobayen
- Acantholimon atrofuscum Rech.f.
- Acantholimon atropatanum Bunge
- Acantholimon auganum Bunge
- Acantholimon aulieatense Czerniak.
- Acantholimon austroiranicum Rech.f. & Schiman-Czeika
- Acantholimon avanosicum Doan & Akaydn
- Acantholimon avenaceum Bunge
- Acantholimon azizae Mobayen

== B ==
- Acantholimon bakhtiaricum Assadi
- Acantholimon balchanicum Korovin
- Acantholimon bashkaleicum Doğan & Akaydın
- Acantholimon × baubaschatense Lazkov
- Acantholimon birandii Doan & Akaydn
- Acantholimon blakelockii Mobayen
- Acantholimon blandum Czerniak.
- Acantholimon bodeanum Bunge
- Acantholimon bonesseae Parsa
- Acantholimon borodinii Krasn.
- Acantholimon brachyphyllum Boiss.
- Acantholimon brachystachyum Boiss. ex Bunge
- Acantholimon bracteatum (Girard) Boiss.
- Acantholimon brecklei Rech.f. & Schiman-Czeika
- Acantholimon bromifolium Boiss. ex Bunge
- Acantholimon butkovii Lincz.

== C ==
- Acantholimon cabulicum Boiss.
- Acantholimon caesareum Boiss. & Balansa
- Acantholimon calocephalum Aitch. & Hemsl.
- Acantholimon calvertii Boiss.
- Acantholimon capitatum Sosn.
- Acantholimon carinatum Rech.f. & Schiman-Czeika
- Acantholimon caryophyllaceum Boiss.
- Acantholimon catenatum Rech.f. & Schiman-Czeika
- Acantholimon cephalotes Boiss.
- Acantholimon cephalotoides Rech.f.
- Acantholimon chitralicum Rech.f. & Schiman-Czeika
- Acantholimon chlorostegium Rech.f. & Schiman-Czeika
- Acantholimon chrysostegium Rech.f. & Schiman-Czeika
- Acantholimon cleistocalyx Hand.-Mazz.
- Acantholimon collare Köie & Rech.f.
- Acantholimon compactum Korovin
- Acantholimon confertiflorum Bokhari
- Acantholimon cupreo-olivascens Rech.f. & Schiman-Czeika
- Acantholimon cymosum Bunge

== D ==
- Acantholimon damassanum Mobayen
- Acantholimon davisii Akaydın & M.B.Crespo
- Acantholimon demavendicum Bornm.
- Acantholimon densiflorum Assadi
- Acantholimon desertorum Regel
- Acantholimon dianthifolium Bokhari
- Acantholimon diapensioides Boiss.
- Acantholimon distachyum Boiss.
- Acantholimon distichum Rech.f. & Schiman-Czeika
- Acantholimon diversifolium O.Schwarz & F.Mey.
- Acantholimon doganii Bağcı, Doğu & Akaydın

== E ==
- Acantholimon ecae Aitch. & Hemsl.
- Acantholimon edmondsonii Rech.f. & Schiman-Czeika
- Acantholimon ekatherinae (B.Fedtsch.) Czerniak.
- Acantholimon ekbergianum Rech.f. & Schiman-Czeika
- Acantholimon ekimii Doğan & Akaydın
- Acantholimon embergeri Mobayen
- Acantholimon erinaceum (Jaub. & Spach) Lincz.
- Acantholimon erythraeum Bunge
- Acantholimon eschkerense Boiss. & Hausskn.
- Acantholimon esfandiarii Rech.f. & Schiman-Czeika
- Acantholimon evrenii Doğan & Akaydın

== F ==
- Acantholimon fasciculare Boiss.
- Acantholimon faustii Trautv.
- Acantholimon fedorovii Tamamsch. & Mirzojeva
- Acantholimon festucaceum (Jaub. & Spach) Boiss.
- Acantholimon fetissovii Regel
- Acantholimon flabellum Assadi
- Acantholimon flexuosum Boiss. & Hausskn. ex Bunge
- Acantholimon fominii Kusn.

== G ==
- Acantholimon gabrieljaniae Mirzoeva
- Acantholimon gadukense Mobayen
- Acantholimon gaudanense Czerniak.
- Acantholimon gemicianum Kaptaner İğci, Körüklü & Aytaç
- Acantholimon genistioides (Jaub. & Spach) Boiss.
- Acantholimon ghoranum Rech.f. & Schiman-Czeika
- Acantholimon gilliatii Turrill
- Acantholimon gillii Rech.f. & Köie
- Acantholimon glabratum Assadi
- Acantholimon glumaceum (Jaub. & Spach) Boiss.
- Acantholimon glutinosum Rech.f. & Köie
- Acantholimon goeksunicum Doan & Akaydn
- Acantholimon gontscharovii Czerniak.
- Acantholimon gorganense Mobayen
- Acantholimon gracillimum Rech.f. & Schiman-Czeika
- Acantholimon graecum F.W.Mey.
- Acantholimon grammophyllum Rech.f. & Köie
- Acantholimon griffithianum Boiss.
- Acantholimon gulistanum Bunge

== H ==
- Acantholimon haesarensis Bornm. ex Rech.f. & Schiman-Czeika
- Acantholimon halophilum Bokhari
- Acantholimon hamadannicum Assadi & Mahmoodi
- Acantholimon hariabense Rech.f. & Köie
- Acantholimon haussknechtii Bunge
- Acantholimon hedinii Ostenf.
- Acantholimon heratense Bunge
- Acantholimon heweri Rech.f. & Schiman-Czeika
- Acantholimon hilariae Ikonn.
- Acantholimon hindukushum Mobayen
- Acantholimon hissaricum Lincz.
- Acantholimon hohenackeri (Jaub. & Spach) Boiss.
- Acantholimon homophyllum Rech.f. & Schiman-Czeika
- Acantholimon hormozganense Assadi
- Acantholimon horridum Bunge
- Acantholimon hoshapicum Doğan & Akaydın
- Acantholimon huetii Boiss.
- Acantholimon hyalinum Rech.f. & Köie
- Acantholimon hypochaerum Bokhari
- Acantholimon hystrix Stapf

== I ==
- Acantholimon ibrahimii Akaydın
- Acantholimon iconicum (Boiss.) Boiss. & Heldr.
- Acantholimon incomptum Boiss. & Buhse
- Acantholimon inerme Rech.f. & Köie

== J ==
- Acantholimon jarmilae Halda

== K ==
- Acantholimon kandaharense Rech.f.
- Acantholimon karabajeviorum Lazkov
- Acantholimon karadarjense Lincz.
- Acantholimon karamanicum Akaydın & Doan
- Acantholimon karatavicum Pavlov
- Acantholimon karelinii (Stschegl.) Bunge
- Acantholimon kaschgaricum Lincz.
- Acantholimon katrantavicum Lincz.
- Acantholimon kermanense Assadi & Mirtadz.
- Acantholimon kjurendaghi Meszer.
- Acantholimon knorringianum Lincz.
- Acantholimon koeiei Rech.f. & Schiman-Czeika
- Acantholimon koelzii Rech.f. & Köie
- Acantholimon koeycegizicum Doan & Akaydn
- Acantholimon kokandense Bunge
- Acantholimon komarovii Czerniak.
- Acantholimon korolkovii (Regel) Korovin
- Acantholimon korovinii Czerniak.
- Acantholimon kotschyi (Jaub. & Spach) Boiss.
- Acantholimon kuramense Lincz.
- Acantholimon kutschanense Rech.f.

== L ==
- Acantholimon laevigatum (T.X.Peng) Kamelin
- Acantholimon langaricum O.Fedtsch. & B.Fedtsch.
- Acantholimon latifolium Boiss.
- Acantholimon laxiflorum Boiss. ex Bunge
- Acantholimon laxum Czerniak.
- Acantholimon lepturoides (Jaub. & Spach) Boiss.
- Acantholimon leucacanthum (Jaub. & Spach) Boiss.
- Acantholimon leucochlorum Rech.f. & Schiman-Czeika
- Acantholimon libanoticum Boiss.
- Acantholimon limbatum (Lincz.) Sennikov
- Acantholimon linczevskianum Lazkov
- Acantholimon linczevskii Pavlov
- Acantholimon litvinovii Lincz.
- Acantholimon longiflorum Boiss.
- Acantholimon longiscapum Bokhari
- Acantholimon lycaonicum Boiss. & Heldr.
- Acantholimon lycopodioides (Girard) Boiss.

== M ==
- Acantholimon macranthum Rech.f. & Köie
- Acantholimon macropetalum Rech.f. & Schiman-Czeika
- Acantholimon macrostachyum Rech.f. & Schiman-Czeika
- Acantholimon majewianum Regel
- Acantholimon manakyanii Ogan.
- Acantholimon margaritae Korovin
- Acantholimon melananthum Boiss.
- Acantholimon mikeschinii Lincz.
- Acantholimon minshelkense Pavlov
- Acantholimon mirtadzadinii Assadi
- Acantholimon mishaudaghense Mobayen
- Acantholimon mobayenii Assadi & Ghahr.
- Acantholimon modestum Bornm. ex Rech.f. & Schiman-Czeika
- Acantholimon moradii Assadi
- Acantholimon movdarinum Parsa
- Acantholimon muchamedshanovii Lincz.
- Acantholimon multiflorum (Bokhari) Doğan & Akaydın
- Acantholimon muradicum O.Schwarz & F.Mey.

== N ==
- Acantholimon nabievii Lincz.
- Acantholimon narynense Lazkov
- Acantholimon nawaricum Rech.f. & Schiman-Czeika
- Acantholimon nigricans Mobayen
- Acantholimon nikitinii Lincz.
- Acantholimon nuratavicum Zakirov

== O ==
- Acantholimon oliganthum Boiss.
- Acantholimon oliveri (Jaub. & Spach) Boiss.
- Acantholimon olympicum (Boiss.) F.W.Mey.
- Acantholimon ophiocladus Rech.f. & Schiman-Czeika

== P ==
- Acantholimon pamiricum Czerniak.
- Acantholimon parviflorum Regel
- Acantholimon pavlovii Lincz.
- Acantholimon peculiare Rech.f.
- Acantholimon petraeum Boiss. & Hausskn. ex Bunge
- Acantholimon petuniiflorum Mobayen
- Acantholimon physostegium Rech.f. & Schiman-Czeika
- Acantholimon podlechii Rech.f. & Schiman-Czeika
- Acantholimon poliochlorum Rech.f. & Schiman-Czeika
- Acantholimon polystachyum Boiss.
- Acantholimon popovii Czerniak.
- Acantholimon procumbens Czerniak.
- Acantholimon pskemense Lincz.
- Acantholimon pterostegium Bunge
- Acantholimon puberulum Boiss. & Balansa
- Acantholimon pulchellum Korovin
- Acantholimon purpureum Korovin

== Q ==
- Acantholimon quettensis Rech.f. & Schiman-Czeika
- Acantholimon quinquelobum Bunge

== R ==
- Acantholimon raddeanum Czerniak.
- Acantholimon raikoviae Czerniak. ex Minchevskii
- Acantholimon rechingeri Freitag
- Acantholimon reflexifolium Bokhari
- Acantholimon restiaceum Bunge
- Acantholimon revolutum Rech.f. & Köie
- Acantholimon rhodopolium Rech.f. & Schiman-Czeika
- Acantholimon riyatguelii Yıldırım
- Acantholimon roborowskii Czerniak.
- Acantholimon rudbaricum (Bornm.) Bornm.
- Acantholimon ruprechtii Bunge

== S ==
- Acantholimon saadii Assadi & Zeraatkar
- Acantholimon sackenii Bunge
- Acantholimon sahendicum Boiss. & Buhse
- Acantholimon salangensis Bokhari
- Acantholimon saravschanicum Regel
- Acantholimon sarytavicum Lincz.
- Acantholimon saxifragiforme Hausskn. & Sint. ex Bokhari
- Acantholimon scabrellum Boiss. & Hausskn.
- Acantholimon schachimardanicum Lincz.
- Acantholimon schahrudicum Bunge
- Acantholimon schemachense Gross
- Acantholimon schirazianum Boiss.
- Acantholimon schizostegium Rech.f. & Schiman-Czeika
- Acantholimon scirpinum Bunge
- Acantholimon sclerophyllum Rech.f. & Schiman-Czeika
- Acantholimon scorpius (Jaub. & Spach) Boiss.
- Acantholimon senganense Bunge
- Acantholimon serotinum Rech.f. & Schiman-Czeika
- Acantholimon setiferum Bunge
- Acantholimon sirchense Assadi & Mirtadz.
- Acantholimon sogdianum (Lincz.) Sennikov
- Acantholimon solidum Rech.f. & Köie
- Acantholimon sorchense Rech.f.
- Acantholimon speciosissimum Aitch. & Hemsl.
- Acantholimon spinicalyx Köie & Rech.f.
- Acantholimon spirizianum Mobayen
- Acantholimon squarrosum Pavlov
- Acantholimon stanjukoviczii Lincz. ex Ikonn.
- Acantholimon stapfianum Rech.f. & Schiman-Czeika
- Acantholimon stenorhaphium Rech.f.
- Acantholimon stereophyllum Rech.f. & Schiman-Czeika
- Acantholimon stocksii Boiss.
- Acantholimon strictiforme Nikitina ex Lazkov
- Acantholimon strictum Czerniak.
- Acantholimon strigillosum Bokhari
- Acantholimon stroterophyllum Rech.f. & Schiman-Czeika
- Acantholimon subavenaceum Lincz.
- Acantholimon subflavescens Rech.f. & Schiman-Czeika
- Acantholimon subsimile Rech.f. & Schiman-Czeika
- Acantholimon subulatum Boiss.

== T ==
- Acantholimon takhtajanii Ogan.
- Acantholimon talagonicum Boiss.
- Acantholimon tarbagataicum Gamajun.
- Acantholimon taschkurganicum Lincz. & N.I.Akshigitova
- Acantholimon tataricum Boiss.
- Acantholimon tenuiflorum Boiss.
- Acantholimon termei Rech.f. & Schiman-Czeika
- Acantholimon tianschanicum Czerniak.
- Acantholimon titovii Lincz.
- Acantholimon tomentellum Boiss.
- Acantholimon tournefortii Boiss.
- Acantholimon tragacanthinum (Jaub. & Spach) Boiss.
- Acantholimon trautvetteri Kusn.
- Acantholimon tricolor Rech.f. & Köie
- Acantholimon trojanum F.W.Mey.
- Acantholimon truncatum Bunge
- Acantholimon tulakensis Rech.f. & Schiman-Czeika
- Acantholimon turcicum Doğan & Akaydın

== U ==
- Acantholimon ulicinum (Willd. ex Schult.) Boiss.

== V ==
- Acantholimon vacillans Rech.f. & Schiman-Czeika
- Acantholimon varivtzevae Czerniak.
- Acantholimon vedicum Mirzoeva
- Acantholimon velutinum Czerniak.
- Acantholimon venustum Boiss.
- Acantholimon virens Czerniak.
- Acantholimon viscidulum Boiss.
- Acantholimon vvedenskyi Lincz.

== W ==
- Acantholimon wendelboi Rech.f. & Schiman-Czeika
- Acantholimon wiedemanii Bunge
- Acantholimon wilhelminae Rech.f. & Schiman-Czeika

== X ==
- Acantholimon xanthacanthum Rech.f. & Köie
- Acantholimon yamense Turrill

== Y ==
- Acantholimon yildizelicum Akaydın

== Z ==
- Acantholimon zaeifii Assadi
- Acantholimon zakirovii Beshko
- Acantholimon zaprjagaevii Lincz.
