= Acantholimon amoenum =

Scientific classification
- Kingdom: Plantae
- Clade: Tracheophytes
- Clade: Angiosperms
- Clade: Eudicots
- Order: Caryophyllales
- Family: Plumbaginaceae
- Genus: Acantholimon
- Species: A. amoenum

Binomial name
- Acantholimon amoenum Rech.f. & Schiman-Czeika (1974)

Species of flowering plant

Acantholimon amoenum is a species of flowering plant in the family Plumbaginaceae. The native range of this species is Afghanistan. It is a subshrub and grows primarily in the temperate biome and was described by Rech.f. & Schiman-Czeika.

== See also ==
- List of Acantholimon species
