= Acantholimon ahangarense =

Scientific classification
- Kingdom: Plantae
- Clade: Tracheophytes
- Clade: Angiosperms
- Clade: Eudicots
- Order: Caryophyllales
- Family: Plumbaginaceae
- Genus: Acantholimon
- Species: A. ahangarense

Binomial name
- Acantholimon ahangarense Rech.f. & Schiman-Czeika.

Species of flowering plant

Acantholimon ahangarense is a species of flowering plant in the family Plumbaginaceae. The native range of this species is Afghanistan (Ghorat) and was described by Rech.f. & Schiman-Czeika.

== See also ==
- List of Acantholimon species
