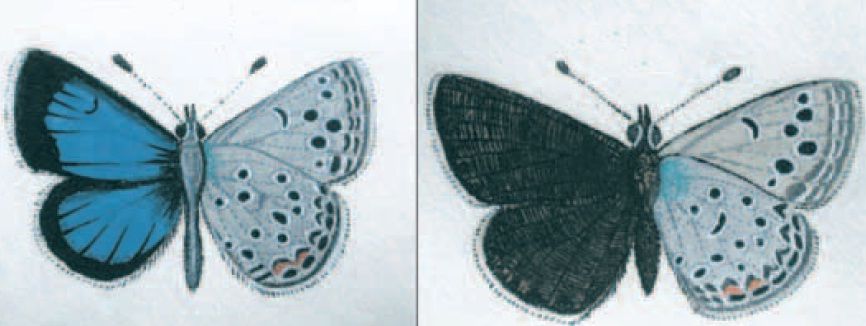
- Male and female

Scientific classification
- Domain: Eukaryota
- Kingdom: Animalia
- Phylum: Arthropoda
- Class: Insecta
- Order: Lepidoptera
- Family: Lycaenidae
- Genus: Turanana
- Species: T. endymion

Binomial name
- Turanana endymion (Freyer, 1850)

Synonyms
- Papilio endymion Freyer, 1850; Lycaena panagaea Herrich-Schäffer, [1851]; Actizera panagaea; Glaucopsyche panagaea; Turanana panagea; Lycaena endymion Freyer, 1852; Lycaena panagaea ahasveros Bytinski-Salz & Brandt, 1937

= Turanana endymion =

Species of butterfly

Turanana endymion, the odd-spot blue or Anatolian odd-spot blue, is a butterfly of the family Lycaenidae. It was described by Christian Friedrich Freyer in 1850. It is found in Turkey, Lebanon and Iran. Records from Europe refer to Turanana taygetica.

The length of the forewings is 10–12 mm. The ground colour of the upperside of the wings is blue with blackish marginal borders. The underside ground colour is light grey brown.

== Description in Seitz ==
L. panagaea H.-Schdff. (= endymion Frr.) (79 b). Above like a small alcedo [ Kretania alcedo (Christoph, 1877)]; male blue with a very broad black margin; female black-brown. At once recognized by the underside, on which the fourth spot of the discal row of ocelli of the forewing, which stands before the upper median vein, is shifted towards the outer margin, being entirely removed from the row. — Syria and Asia Minor, especially near Amasia, also in Armenia, Persia and Turkestan, from June till August, in damp localities, not rare.

The larvae feed on Acantholimon species.

== Subspecies ==
- Turanana endymion endymion (eastern Asiatic Turkey, Lebanon)
- Turanana endymion ahasveros (Bytinski-Salz & Brandt, 1937) (Iran: Elburz Mountains)
