= Acantholimon vvedenskyi =

Scientific classification
- Kingdom: Plantae
- Clade: Tracheophytes
- Clade: Angiosperms
- Clade: Eudicots
- Order: Caryophyllales
- Family: Plumbaginaceae
- Genus: Acantholimon
- Species: A. vvedenskyi

Binomial name
- Acantholimon vvedenskyi Lincz. (1961)

Species of flowering plant

Acantholimon vvedenskyi is a species of flowering plant in the family Plumbaginaceae. The native range of this species is from Central Asia (Uzbekistan). It is a subshrub and grows primarily in the subalpine or subarctic biome and was described by Lincz.

== See also ==
- List of Acantholimon species
