= Acantholimon distichum =

Scientific classification
- Kingdom: Plantae
- Clade: Tracheophytes
- Clade: Angiosperms
- Clade: Eudicots
- Order: Caryophyllales
- Family: Plumbaginaceae
- Genus: Acantholimon
- Species: A. distichum

Binomial name
- Acantholimon distichum Rech.f. & Schiman-Czeika (1974)

Species of flowering plant

Acantholimon distichum is a species of flowering plant within the family Plumbaginaceae. This species is endemic to Sangcharak, Afghanistan. It is a short woody plant that grows primarily in the temperate biome.

It was first described in 1974 by Austrian botanists and phytogeographers, Karl Heinz Rechinger and Helene Schiman-Czeika.

== See also ==
- List of Acantholimon species
