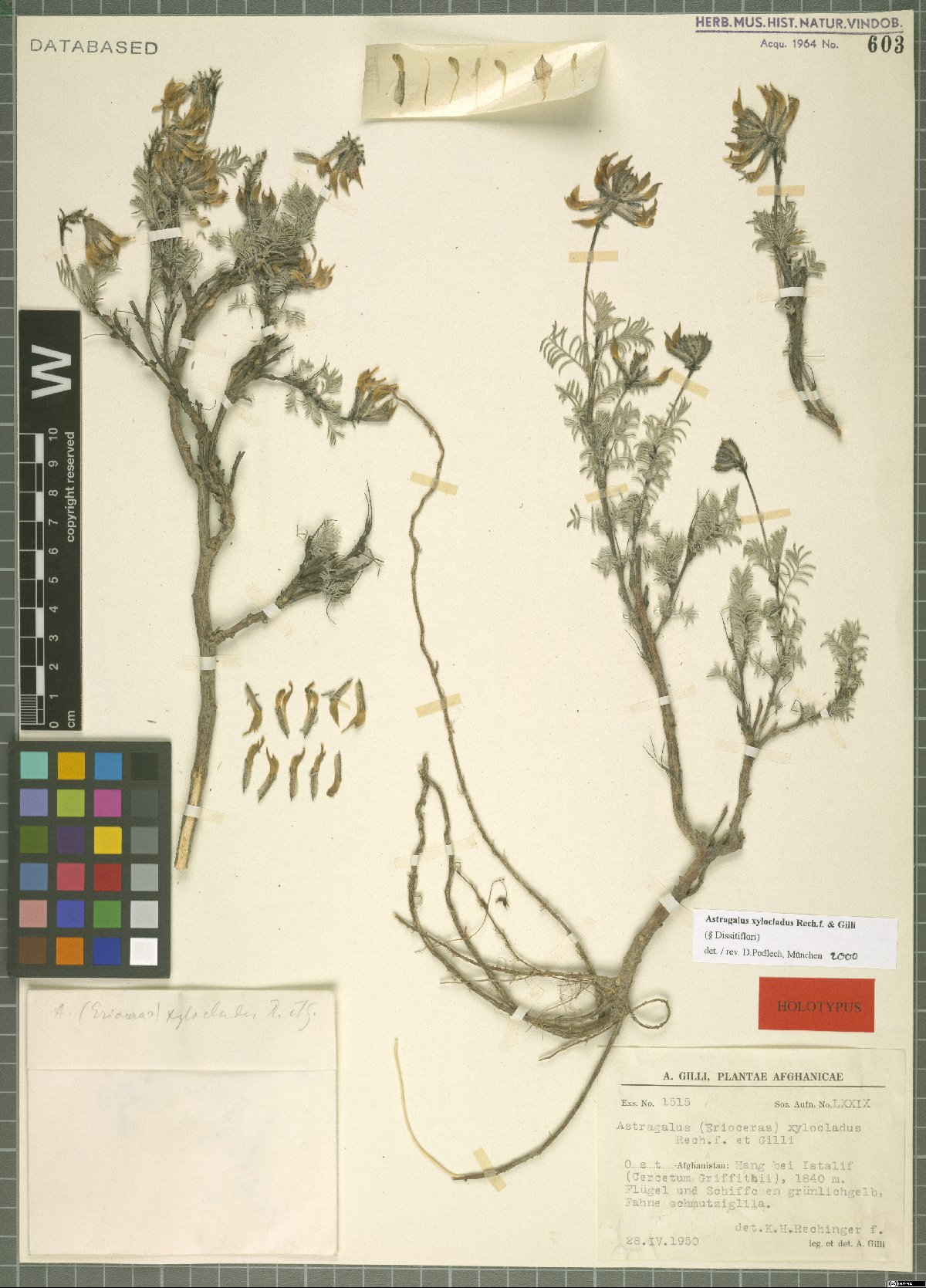

Scientific classification
- Kingdom: Plantae
- Clade: Tracheophytes
- Clade: Angiosperms
- Clade: Eudicots
- Clade: Rosids
- Order: Fabales
- Family: Fabaceae
- Subfamily: Faboideae
- Genus: Astragalus
- Species: A. xylocladus

Binomial name
- Astragalus xylocladus Rech.f. & Gilli.

= Astragalus xylocladus =

Species of flowering plant

Astragalus xylocladus is a species of flowering plant in the family Fabaceae.

The species was described by Karl Heinz Rechinger and Alexander Gilli in 1958.

== Description ==
Astragalus xylocladus is a perennial herb. It is native to Afghanistan.
