= Acantholimon edmondsonii =

Scientific classification
- Kingdom: Plantae
- Clade: Tracheophytes
- Clade: Angiosperms
- Clade: Eudicots
- Order: Caryophyllales
- Family: Plumbaginaceae
- Genus: Acantholimon
- Species: A. edmondsonii

Binomial name
- Acantholimon edmondsonii Rech.f. & Schiman-Czeika (1974)

Species of flowering plant

Acantholimon edmondsonii is a species of flowering plant in the family Plumbaginaceae. The native range of this species is North East Iran. It is a subshrub and grows primarily in the temperate biome.

It was first described in 1974 by Austrian botanists and phytogeographers, Karl Heinz Rechinger and Helene Schiman-Czeika.

== See also ==
- List of Acantholimon species
