= Acantholimon collare =

Scientific classification
- Kingdom: Plantae
- Clade: Tracheophytes
- Clade: Angiosperms
- Clade: Eudicots
- Order: Caryophyllales
- Family: Plumbaginaceae
- Genus: Acantholimon
- Species: A. collare

Binomial name
- Acantholimon collare Köie & Rech.f.

Species of flowering plant

Acantholimon collare is a species of flowering plant in the Plumbaginaceae family described by Mogens Engell Köie and Karl Heinz Rechinger. The native range of this species is North East Iran. A phytochemical analysis from the University of Birjand found that the antimicrobial nature of compounds found in A. collare make it potentially suitable for pharmaceutical use.

== See also ==
- List of Acantholimon species
