= Alexander Gilli =

Austrian botanist (1904–2007)

Alexander Gilli (29 April 1904 - 16 May 2007) was an Austrian botanist and pteridologist. He was a pioneer in research on plant communities.

== Some publications ==
- 1968. Afghanische Pflanzengesellschaften. Vegetatio 16 (5/6): 307—375 doi 10.1007/BF00257022
- 1979. Beiträge zur Flora von Papua-New Guinea, II. Dicotyledones. Ann. des Naturhistorischen Museums in Wien 83: 417—474

== Honors ==
- Corresponding member of the "Naturhistorisches Museum"

=== Eponyms ===
Several species are named after Gilli, including:

- (Alliaceae) Allium gillii Wendelbo
- (Plumbaginaceae) Acantholimon gillii Rech.f. & Koeie
