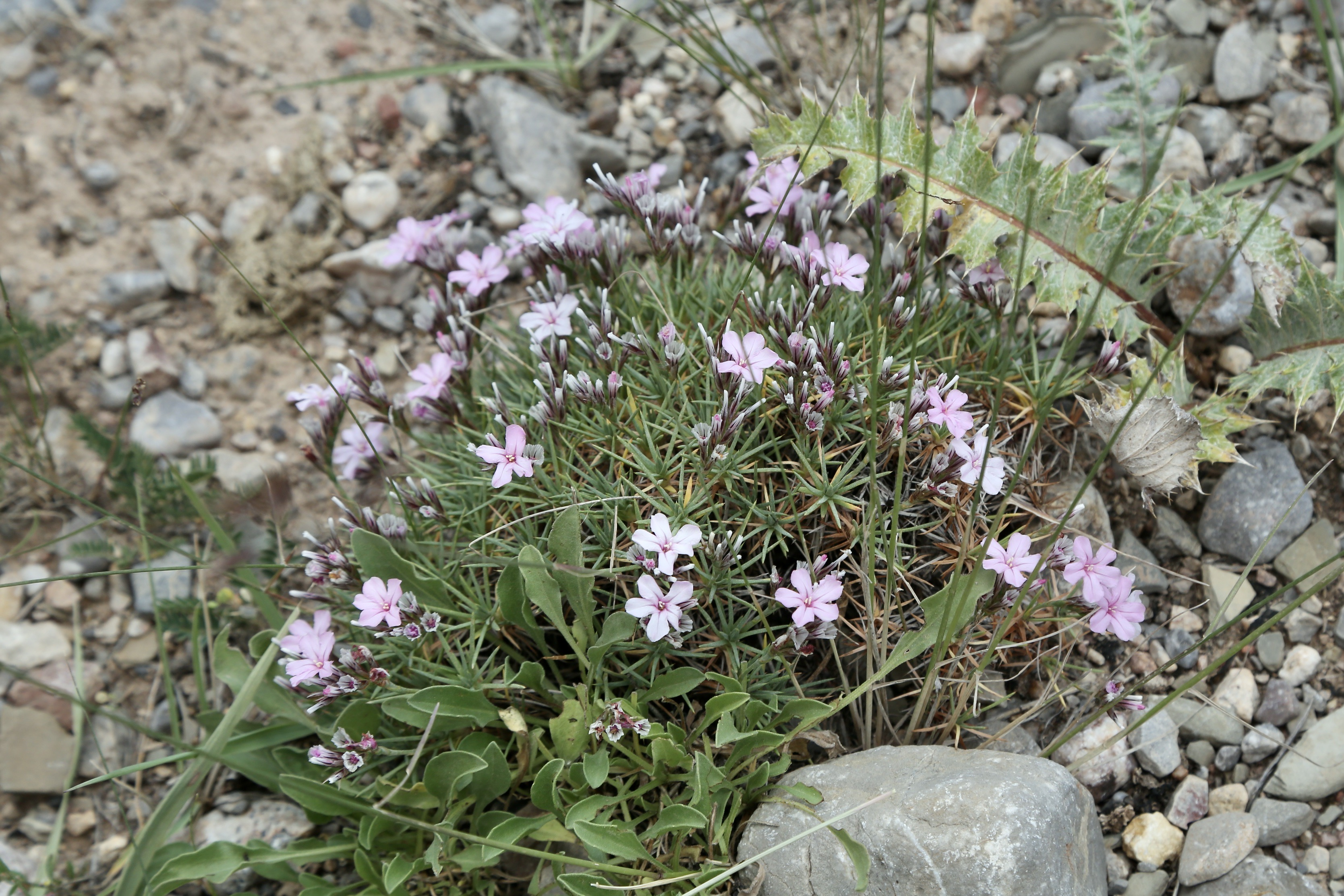

Scientific classification
- Kingdom: Plantae
- Clade: Tracheophytes
- Clade: Angiosperms
- Clade: Eudicots
- Order: Caryophyllales
- Family: Plumbaginaceae
- Genus: Acantholimon
- Species: A. alatavicum

Binomial name
- Acantholimon alatavicum Bunge.

= Acantholimon alatavicum =

Species of flowering plant

Acantholimon alatavicum is a species of flowering plant in the family Plumbaginaceae. The native range of this species is from Central Asia to West Xinjiang and was described by Bunge.

== See also ==
- List of Acantholimon species
