= Acantholimon zaprjagaevii =

Scientific classification
- Kingdom: Plantae
- Clade: Tracheophytes
- Clade: Angiosperms
- Clade: Eudicots
- Order: Caryophyllales
- Family: Plumbaginaceae
- Genus: Acantholimon
- Species: A. zaprjagaevii

Binomial name
- Acantholimon zaprjagaevii Lincz.

Species of flowering plant

Acantholimon zaprjagaevii is a species of flowering plant in the family Plumbaginaceae. The native range of this species is from Tajikistan to Afghanistan. It is a subshrub and grows primarily in the temperate biome and was discovered by Igor Lintchevski.
