= Dipchasphecia kopica =

Scientific classification
- Kingdom: Animalia
- Phylum: Arthropoda
- Class: Insecta
- Order: Lepidoptera
- Family: Sesiidae
- Genus: Dipchasphecia
- Species: D. kopica

Binomial name
- Dipchasphecia kopica Gorbunov & Špatenka, 2001

Species of moth

Dipchasphecia kopica is a moth of the family Sesiidae. It is found in north-eastern Turkey.

The larvae feed on the roots of Acantholimon species.
