= Acantholimon acanthobryum =

Scientific classification
- Kingdom: Plantae
- Clade: Tracheophytes
- Clade: Angiosperms
- Clade: Eudicots
- Order: Caryophyllales
- Family: Plumbaginaceae
- Genus: Acantholimon
- Species: A. acanthobryum

Binomial name
- Acantholimon acanthobryum Rech.f. & Schiman-Czeika

Species of flowering plant

Acantholimon acanthobryum is a species of flowering plant in the Plumbaginaceae family. The species is epidemic to Ghazni, Afghanistan and was discovered by Rech.f. & Schiman-Czeika.

== See also ==
- List of Acantholimon species
