= Karvandarina =

Scientific classification
- Kingdom: Plantae
- Clade: Tracheophytes
- Clade: Angiosperms
- Clade: Eudicots
- Clade: Asterids
- Order: Asterales
- Family: Asteraceae
- Subtribe: Centaureinae
- Genus: Karvandarina; Rech.f.

Species
- See text.

Genus of flowering plants

Karvandarina is a genus of flowering plants in the tribe Cardueae within the family Asteraceae, it contains two described species that are native to Iran and Pakistan.

As of May 2024, Plants of the World Online accepted two species:

- Karvandarina aphylla Rech.f., Aellen & Esfand.
- Karvandarina cartilaginea (Mozaff.) Parishani, Mirtadz. & Bordbar
