= Acantholimon afanassievii =

Scientific classification
- Kingdom: Plantae
- Clade: Tracheophytes
- Clade: Angiosperms
- Clade: Eudicots
- Order: Caryophyllales
- Family: Plumbaginaceae
- Genus: Acantholimon
- Species: A. afanassievii

Binomial name
- Acantholimon afanassievii Lincz.

Species of flowering plant

Acantholimon afanassievii is a species of flowering plant in the family Plumbaginaceae. The native range of this species is in Central Asia and it was discovered by Lincz.

== See also ==
- List of Acantholimon species
