= Acantholimon alavae =

Scientific classification
- Kingdom: Plantae
- Clade: Tracheophytes
- Clade: Angiosperms
- Clade: Eudicots
- Order: Caryophyllales
- Family: Plumbaginaceae
- Genus: Acantholimon
- Species: A. alavae

Binomial name
- Acantholimon alavae Rech.f. & Schiman-Czeika

Species of flowering plant

Acantholimon alavae is a species of flowering plant in the family Plumbaginaceae. The native range of this species is Iran and was described by Rech.f. & Schiman-Czeika.
