= Igor Lintchevski =

Igor Alexandrovitch Lintchevski
- Born: 16 June 1908; Saint Petersburg, Russian Empire
- Died: 18 July 1997 (aged 89); Saint Petersburg, Russia
- Scientific career
- Fields: Botany
- Workplaces: Komarov Botanical Institute
- Author abbrev. (botany): Lincz.

Igor Alexandrovitch Lintchevski (Russian: Игорь Александрович Линчевский) (16 June 1908 – 18 July 1997) was a Russian botanist.

== Biography ==
Igor Lintchevski was born in Leningrad in a teaching family. His childhood and education were in Tashkent . In 1926–1930, he studied at the National University of Uzbekistan, then became assistant to the Vavilov Institute and collaborated with Mikhail Grigorevich Popov . He later moved to Almaty and worked in the Kazakh section in the Russian Academy of Sciences . In 1939 he moved to Leningrad . In November 1941, while the war raged in the besieged city, Lintchevski had his viva. He also worked on the drafting of the 10th volume of the Flora USSR encyclopedia. Later he was awarded the Medal "For the Defence of Leningrad" . From 1964 to 1971 he was the chief editor of the magazine dedicated to the Botanical Journal of the taxonomy of terrestrial plants ( "Новости систематики высших растений"). He retired in 1995.

The standard author abbreviation Lincz. is used to indicate this person as the author when citing a botanical name.

== Career ==
He has conducted extensive botanical expeditions in Central Asia between 1928 and 1932, in Kamchatka in 1935 and in the Urals between 1921 and 1927 [3] . As well as the Sino-Soviet expedition to Yunnan in 1956–1957 with scientists like Andrei Fyodorov, Moissey Kirpitchnikov and zoologists as VV Popov and entomologist Oleg Kryjanovski.

== Eponyms ==
- (Apiaceae) Bupleurum linczevskii Pimenov & Sdobnina
- (Asteraceae) Steptorhamphus linczevskii Kirp.
- (Lamiaceae) Perovskia linczevskii Kudrj.
- (Leguminosae) Oxytropis linczevskii Gontsch.
- (Plumbaginaceae) Acantholimon linczevskii Pavlov
- (Poaceae) Roegneria linczevskii Czopanov
- (Rosaceae) Malus linczevskii Poljakov
- (Scrophulariaceae) Orobanche linczevskii Novopokr.
