= Dipchasphecia sertavula =

Scientific classification
- Kingdom: Animalia
- Phylum: Arthropoda
- Class: Insecta
- Order: Lepidoptera
- Family: Sesiidae
- Genus: Dipchasphecia
- Species: D. sertavula

Binomial name
- Dipchasphecia sertavula Bartsch & Špatenka, 2002

Synonyms
- Dipchasphecia servatula Bartsch & Špatenka, 2002

Species of moth

Dipchasphecia sertavula is a moth of the family Sesiidae. It is found only in the Sertavul Pass in southern Turkey.

The larvae feed on the roots of Acantholimon species.
