= Turanana chitrali =

Scientific classification
- Kingdom: Animalia
- Phylum: Arthropoda
- Clade: Pancrustacea
- Class: Insecta
- Order: Lepidoptera
- Family: Lycaenidae
- Genus: Turanana
- Species: T. chitrali

Binomial name
- Turanana chitrali Charmeux and Pagès, 2004

Species of butterfly

Turanana chitrali, the Chitral argus blue, is a butterfly in the family Lycaenidae. It is found in Zani Pass in Pakistan and Kashmir and was described in 2004.

== Description ==
=== Male ===
The upperside is brown, with whitish fringes and some violet-blue scales. The submarginal border is wide, approximately 3 mm. The underside forewing is greyish beige with a submarginal mark, while the hindwing has two spots in the basal area.

=== Female ===
The upperside is similar to the male, but the violet is less extensive. The underside is also similar but the white submarginal line is more contrasted.

This species is distinguished from Turanana cytis, Turanana laspura and Turanana jurileontyi by the absence of black spots on the upperside.
