= Acantholimon alaicum =

Scientific classification
- Kingdom: Plantae
- Clade: Tracheophytes
- Clade: Angiosperms
- Clade: Eudicots
- Order: Caryophyllales
- Family: Plumbaginaceae
- Genus: Acantholimon
- Species: A. alaicum

Binomial name
- Acantholimon alaicum Czerniak.

Species of flowering plant

Acantholimon alaicum is a species of flowering plant in the family Plumbaginaceae. The native range of this species is Central Asia, more specifically Kyrgyzstan and was described by Czerniak.

== See also ==
- List of Acantholimon species
