= Acantholimon aegaeum =

Conservation status
- Vulnerable (IUCN 3.1)

Scientific classification
- Kingdom: Plantae
- Clade: Tracheophytes
- Clade: Angiosperms
- Clade: Eudicots
- Order: Caryophyllales
- Family: Plumbaginaceae
- Genus: Acantholimon
- Species: A. aegaeum

Binomial name
- Acantholimon aegaeum F.W.Mey. (1987)

Species of flowering plant

Acantholimon aegaeum is a species of flowering plant in the Plumbaginaceae family. It is a subshrub native to the East Aegean Islands. It was first described by Fred W. Meyer in 1987.

== See also ==
- List of Acantholimon species
