= Acantholimon albanicum =

Scientific classification
- Kingdom: Plantae
- Clade: Tracheophytes
- Clade: Angiosperms
- Clade: Eudicots
- Order: Caryophyllales
- Family: Plumbaginaceae
- Genus: Acantholimon
- Species: A. albanicum

Binomial name
- Acantholimon albanicum O.Schwarz & F.Mey.

Species of flowering plant

Acantholimon albanicum is a species of flowering plant in the family Plumbaginaceae. The native range of this species is South East Albania. It is a perennial and grows primarily in the temperate biome and was described by O.Schwarz & F.Mey.

== See also ==
- List of Acantholimon species
