= Astragalus zerabulaki =

Scientific classification
- Kingdom: Plantae
- Clade: Tracheophytes
- Clade: Angiosperms
- Clade: Eudicots
- Clade: Rosids
- Order: Fabales
- Family: Fabaceae
- Subfamily: Faboideae
- Genus: Astragalus
- Species: A. zerabulaki

Binomial name
- Astragalus zerabulaki Popov

Species of flowering plant

Astragalus zerabulaki is a species of flowering plant in the family Fabaceae. It is a perennial native to Uzbekistan, and was described in 1947.

== Taxonomy ==
The species was described by Mikhail Grigorevich Popov in 1947.

== Distribution ==
Astragalus zerabulaki is native to the temperate biome of Uzbekistan.

== Description ==
Astragalus zerabulaki is a perennial.
