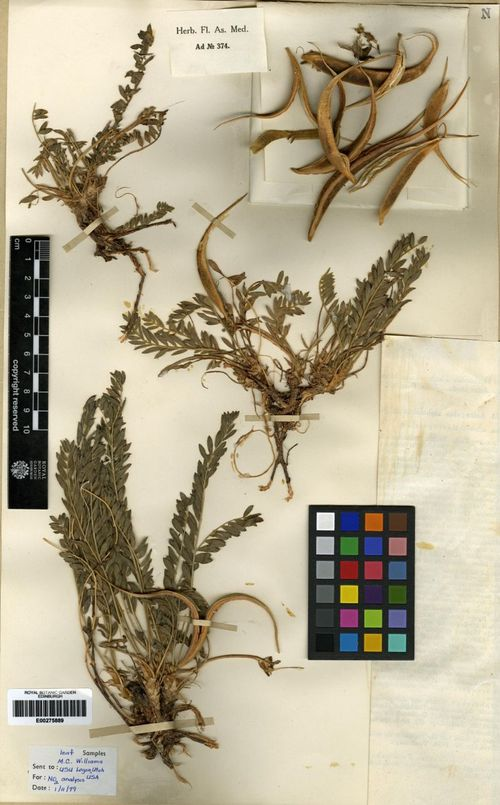

Scientific classification
- Kingdom: Plantae
- Clade: Tracheophytes
- Clade: Angiosperms
- Clade: Eudicots
- Clade: Rosids
- Order: Fabales
- Family: Fabaceae
- Subfamily: Faboideae
- Genus: Astragalus
- Species: A. xipholobus

Binomial name
- Astragalus xipholobus Popov.

= Astragalus xipholobus =

Species of flowering plant

Astragalus xipholobus is a species of flowering plant in the family Fabaceae.

The species was named by Mikhail Grigorevich Popov in 1928.

== Description ==
Astragalus xipholobus is a perennial.

== Distribution ==
The species is native to Kazakhstan and Kyrgyzstan. It has been recorded in Shymkent, Taraz, and Bishkek.
