= Acantholimon albocalycinum =

Scientific classification
- Kingdom: Plantae
- Clade: Tracheophytes
- Clade: Angiosperms
- Clade: Eudicots
- Order: Caryophyllales
- Family: Plumbaginaceae
- Genus: Acantholimon
- Species: A. albocalycinum

Binomial name
- Acantholimon albocalycinum Assadi & Mirtadz (2006)

Species of flowering plant

Acantholimon albocalycinum is a species of flowering plant in the family Plumbaginaceae. The native range of this species is Iran (Kerman). It is a subshrub and grows primarily in the temperate biome and was described by Assadi & Mirtadz.

== See also ==
- List of Acantholimon species
