= Acantholimon agropyroideum =

Scientific classification
- Kingdom: Plantae
- Clade: Tracheophytes
- Clade: Angiosperms
- Clade: Eudicots
- Order: Caryophyllales
- Family: Plumbaginaceae
- Genus: Acantholimon
- Species: A. agropyroideum

Binomial name
- Acantholimon agropyroideum Mobayen

Species of flowering plant

Acantholimon agropyroideum is a species of flowering plant in the Plumbaginaceae family. The native range of this species is Syria and Lebanon and was discovered by Mobayen.

== See also ==
- List of Acantholimon species
