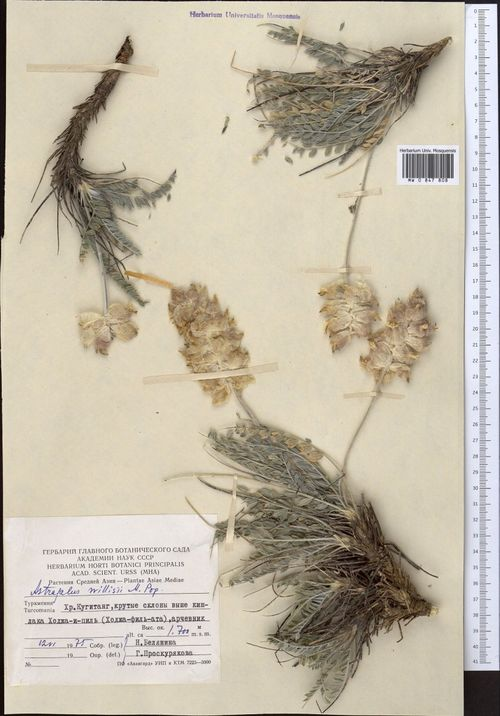

Scientific classification
- Kingdom: Plantae
- Clade: Embryophytes
- Clade: Tracheophytes
- Clade: Spermatophytes
- Clade: Angiosperms
- Clade: Eudicots
- Clade: Rosids
- Order: Fabales
- Family: Fabaceae
- Subfamily: Faboideae
- Genus: Astragalus
- Species: A. willisii

Binomial name
- Astragalus willisii Popov

Synonyms
- Halicacabus willisii (Popov) Nevski

= Astragalus willisii =

Species of flowering plant

Astragalus willisii is a species of flowering plant in the family Fabaceae. It is a subshrub.

The species is native to Uzbekistan and Turkmenistan, and was described in 1923.

== Taxonomy ==
Astragalus willisii was described by Mikhail Grigorevich Popov in 1923.

== Distribution ==
Astragalus willisii is native to the temperate biome of Uzbekistan and Turkmenistan.

== Nomenclature ==
In Russian, the species is known as Астрагал Виллиса (Astragal Villisa).
