= Registaniella =

Scientific classification
- Kingdom: Plantae
- Clade: Tracheophytes
- Clade: Angiosperms
- Clade: Eudicots
- Clade: Asterids
- Order: Apiales
- Family: Apiaceae
- Genus: Registaniella; Rech.f.

Genus of plants

Registaniella is a genus of flowering plants belonging to the family Apiaceae.

Its native range is Afghanistan.

Species:

- Registaniella hapaxlegomena Rech.f.
