= Mastigosciadium =

Scientific classification
- Kingdom: Plantae
- Clade: Tracheophytes
- Clade: Angiosperms
- Clade: Eudicots
- Clade: Asterids
- Order: Apiales
- Family: Apiaceae
- Subfamily: Apioideae
- Tribe: Komarovieae
- Genus: Mastigosciadium; Rech.f. & Kuber
- Species: M. hysteranthum

Binomial name
- Mastigosciadium hysteranthum Rech.f. & Kuber

Genus of plants

Mastigosciadium is a genus of flowering plants belonging to the family Apiaceae. It contains a single species, Mastigosciadium hysteranthum, a perennial endemic to southwestern Afghanistan.
