= Astragalus xanthoxiphidiopsis =

Scientific classification
- Kingdom: Plantae
- Clade: Tracheophytes
- Clade: Angiosperms
- Clade: Eudicots
- Clade: Rosids
- Order: Fabales
- Family: Fabaceae
- Subfamily: Faboideae
- Genus: Astragalus
- Species: A. xanthoxiphidiopsis

Binomial name
- Astragalus xanthoxiphidiopsis Rech.f.

Species of flowering plant

Astragalus xanthoxiphidiopsis is a species of flowering plant in the family Fabaceae.

A. xanthoxiphidiopsis is native to Pakistan and eastern Afghanistan.

== Taxonomy ==
Astragalus xanthoxiphidiopsis was named by Karl Heinz Rechinger in 1958. The type specimen repository is LMU Munich.

== Description ==
A. xanthoxiphidiopsis is a perennial herb.

The stems are covered with short, soft, hairs, which are black and white. The leaves are compound, and have an odd number of primary segments. Leaves are 2.5–8 centimetres (0.98–3.15 in) long. The leaflets are 5–10 millimetres (0.20–0.39 in) long, 1–3 millimetres (0.039–0.118 in) wide, and have hairs on both sides. The leaves have 2–2.5 millimetres (0.079–0.098 in) appendages at the base.

The flowers are produced in a series, on stalks. The flower stalk is 6–22 millimetres (0.24–0.87 in). The calyx is 12–16 millimetres (0.47–0.63 in) long, and has 3–4 millimetres (0.12–0.16 in) long teeth. The upper petal is 2.2–2.5 centimetres (0.87–0.98 in) long.

The fruits are 2–3.5 centimetres (0.79–1.38 in) long, and around 2 millimetres (0.079 in) wide.
