= Acantholimon akaydinii =

Scientific classification
- Kingdom: Plantae
- Clade: Tracheophytes
- Clade: Angiosperms
- Clade: Eudicots
- Order: Caryophyllales
- Family: Plumbaginaceae
- Genus: Acantholimon
- Species: A. akaydinii

Binomial name
- Acantholimon akaydinii Özüdoğru

Species of flowering plant

Acantholimon akaydinii is a species of flowering plant in the family Plumbaginaceae. The native range of this species is Turkey and was discovered by Özüdoğru.

== See also ==
- List of Acantholimon species
