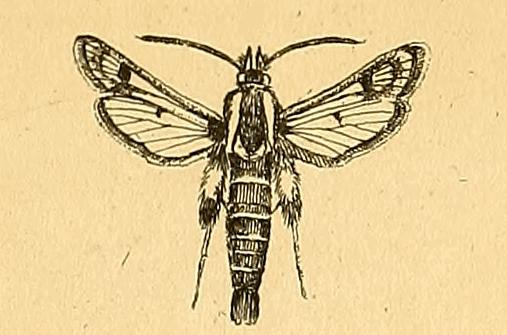

Scientific classification
- Domain: Eukaryota
- Kingdom: Animalia
- Phylum: Arthropoda
- Class: Insecta
- Order: Lepidoptera
- Family: Sesiidae
- Tribe: Synanthedonini
- Genus: Dipchasphecia; Capuse, 1973

Species
- See text

= Dipchasphecia =

Genus of moths

Dipchasphecia is a genus of moths in the family Sesiidae.

== Species ==
- Dipchasphecia altaica Gorbunov, 1991
- Dipchasphecia consobrina (Le Cerf, 1938)
- Dipchasphecia intermedia Špatenka, 1997
- Dipchasphecia iskander Gorbunov, 1994
- Dipchasphecia kashgarensis Špatenka & Kallies, 2001
- Dipchasphecia kopica Gorbunov & Špatenka, 2001
- Dipchasphecia krocha Gorbunov, 1991
- Dipchasphecia kurdaica Špatenka, Petersen & Kallies, 1997
- Dipchasphecia lanipes (Lederer, 1863)
- Dipchasphecia ljusiae Gorbunov, 1991
- Dipchasphecia naumanni Gorbunov, 1991
- Dipchasphecia nigra Gorbunov, 1991
- Dipchasphecia pudorina (Staudinger, 1881)
- Dipchasphecia rhodocnemis Gorbunov, 1991
- Dipchasphecia roseiventris (Bartel, 1912)
- Dipchasphecia sertavula Bartsch & Špatenka, 2002
- Dipchasphecia turkmena Gorbunov, 1994
