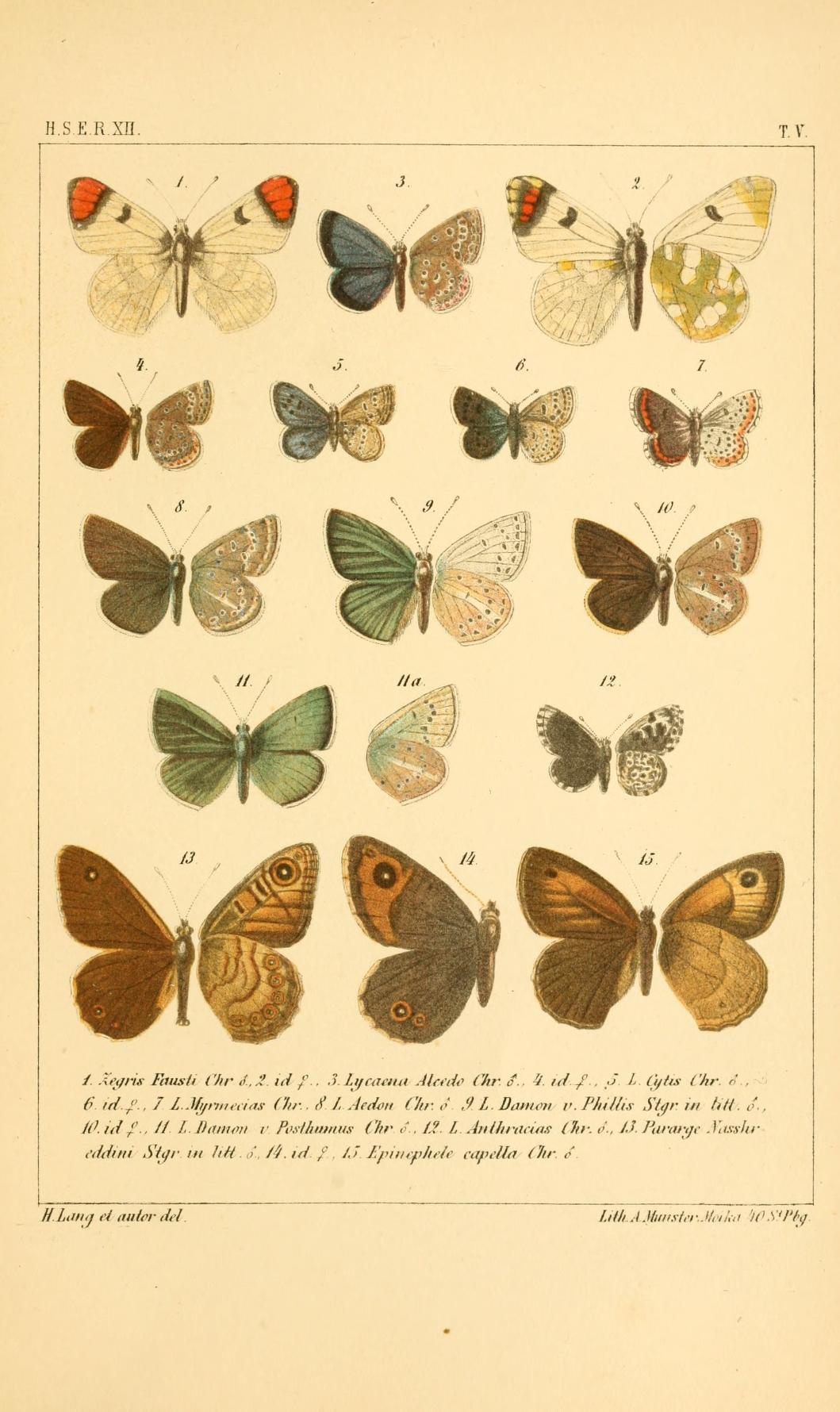
- In Horae Societatis Entomologicae Rossicae

Scientific classification
- Domain: Eukaryota
- Kingdom: Animalia
- Phylum: Arthropoda
- Class: Insecta
- Order: Lepidoptera
- Family: Lycaenidae
- Genus: Turanana
- Species: T. cytis

Binomial name
- Turanana cytis (Christoph, 1877)

Synonyms
- Lycaena cytis Christoph, 1877

= Turanana cytis =

Species of butterfly

Turanana cytis, the Persian odd-spot blue, is a butterfly of the family Lycaenidae. It was described by Hugo Theodor Christoph in 1877. It is found in Turkey, the Kopet-Dagh and Iran (the Alborz and Zagros Mountains).

The larvae feed on Acantholimon species.
