= Karvandarina aphylla =

Scientific classification
- Kingdom: Plantae
- Clade: Tracheophytes
- Clade: Angiosperms
- Clade: Eudicots
- Clade: Asterids
- Order: Asterales
- Family: Asteraceae
- Genus: Karvandarina
- Species: K. aphylla

Binomial name
- Karvandarina aphylla Rech.f., Aellen & Esfand.

Species of plant

Karvandarina aphylla is a species of flowering plant in the tribe Cardueae within the family Asteraceae, native to Iran and Pakistan. It was first described in 1950.

It is an erect, 60-70 cm tall, woody herb. Stem much branched, basally whitish villous, green-glabrous above. Leaves linear-lanceolate, 10-20 cm long, 4-7 mm wide, fragile, glabrous, pale to green, sinuate-serrate, tooth prolonged into 1-3 mm long spinules. Capitula solitary, terminal. Flowers pink.
