= Allium gillii =

Scientific classification
- Kingdom: Plantae
- Clade: Tracheophytes
- Clade: Angiosperms
- Clade: Monocots
- Order: Asparagales
- Family: Amaryllidaceae
- Subfamily: Allioideae
- Genus: Allium
- Species: A. gillii

Binomial name
- Allium gillii (Gilli) Wendelbo

Synonyms
- Allium scabrum Gilli 1954, illegitimate homonym of Gilib. 1792.

Species of plant

Allium gillii is a plant species found in Pakistan and Afghanistan. It is a bulb-forming perennial up to 35 cm tall, with an umbel of long-pediceled pale purple flowers.
