= Acantholimon gillii =

Scientific classification
- Kingdom: Plantae
- Clade: Tracheophytes
- Clade: Angiosperms
- Clade: Eudicots
- Order: Caryophyllales
- Family: Plumbaginaceae
- Genus: Acantholimon
- Species: A. gillii

Binomial name
- Acantholimon gillii Rech.f. & Köie

Species of plant

Acantholimon gillii is a species of plant described by Karl Heinz Rechinger and Mogens Engell Köie. Acantholimon gillii is part of the genus Acantholimon and the family Plumbaginaceae.
