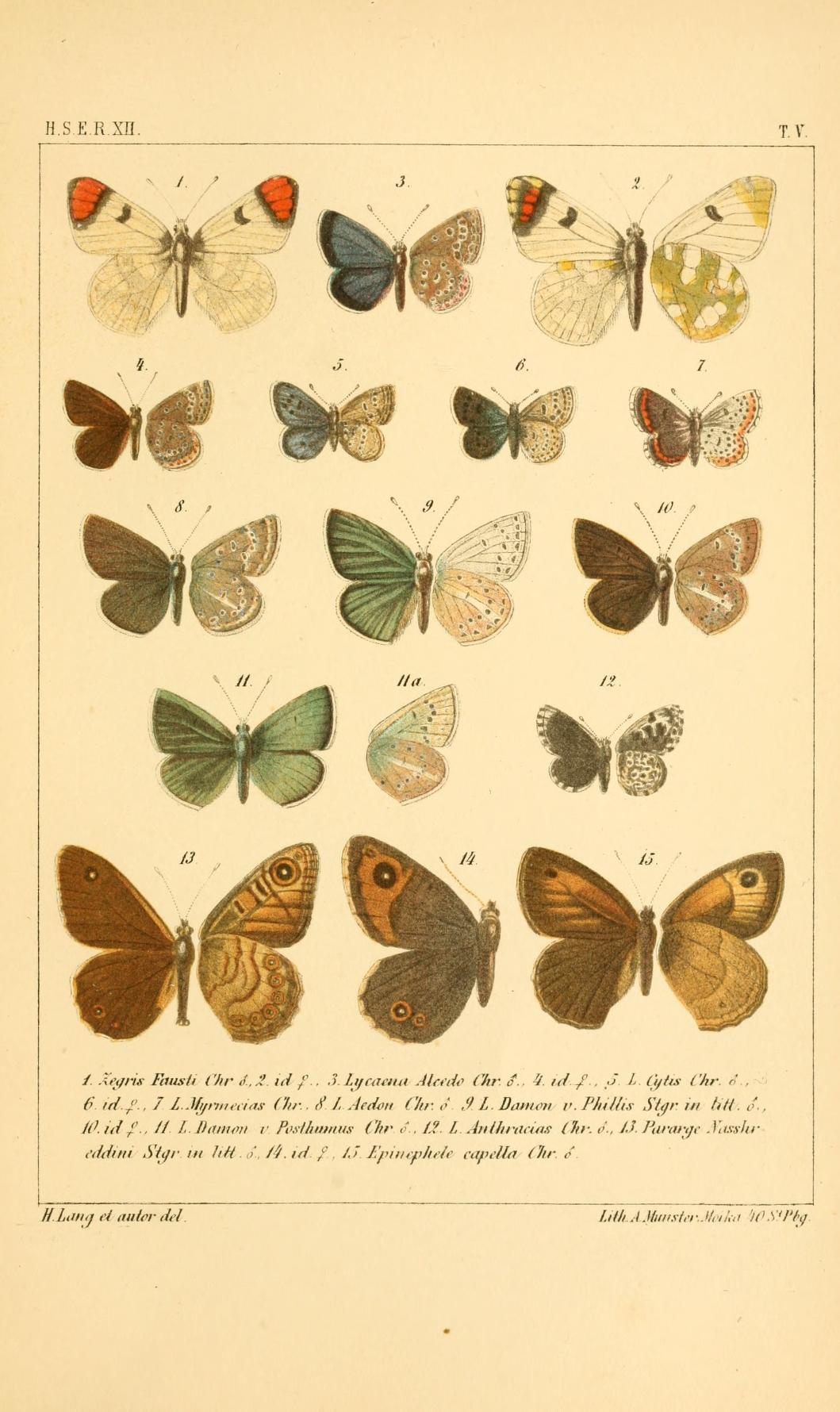
- Turanana cytis figured in Horae Societatis entomologicae rossicae

Scientific classification
- Kingdom: Animalia
- Phylum: Arthropoda
- Class: Insecta
- Order: Lepidoptera
- Family: Lycaenidae
- Subfamily: Polyommatinae
- Tribe: Polyommatini
- Genus: Turanana; Bethune-Baker, 1916

Synonyms
- Turania Bethune-Baker, 1914 (preocc.)

= Turanana =

Butterfly genus in family Lycaenidae

Turanana is a genus of butterflies in the family Lycaenidae. It is found in the east Palearctic from Greece to Central Asia.

== Species ==
- Turanana anisophthalma (Kollar, [1849]) Kopet-Dagh Mountains, West Pamirs, Iran (Elburs Mountains, Zagros Mountains), Afghanistan (Hindu Kush)
- Turanana chitrali Charmeux & Pagès, 2004 Pakistan (Zani Pass)
- Turanana cytis (Christoph, 1877)
- Turanana dushak Dubatolov, 1989 Kopet-Dagh Mountains
- Turanana endymion (Freyer, 1850)
- Turanana grumi Forster, 1937 Pamirs, Northeast Hindu Kush
- Turanana jurileontyi Shchetkin, 1986 Turkenstansky Mountains
- Turanana kugitangi Zhdanko, 1984 Armenia (mountains), Kopet-Dagh Mountains, South Ghissar
- Turanana laspura (Evans, 1932) Turkestansky Mountains, Ghissar, Darvaz, Pamirs, Alai, NorthWest Himalaya
- Turanana mystica Morgun & Tikhonov, 2010 Daghestan
- Turanana panaegides (Staudinger, 1886) Ghissar, West Tian-Shan, Inner Tian-Shan, Alai, Pamirs, Hindu Kush
- Turanana taygetica (Rebel, 1902)
