= Acantholimon antilibanoticum =

Scientific classification
- Kingdom: Plantae
- Clade: Tracheophytes
- Clade: Angiosperms
- Clade: Eudicots
- Order: Caryophyllales
- Family: Plumbaginaceae
- Genus: Acantholimon
- Species: A. antilibanoticum

Binomial name
- Acantholimon antilibanoticum Mouterde

Synonyms
- Acantholimon caryophyllaceum var. brachystachium Boiss.; Armeriastrum libanoticum Kuntze

Species of flowering plant

Acantholimon antilibanoticum is a species of flowering plant in the family Plumbaginaceae. The species was described by the French Jesuit botanist Paul Mouterde and is named for the Anti-Lebanon mountain range, the limestone ridge that forms the majority of the border between Lebanon and Syria.

== Distribution and habitat ==
The species is native to Lebanon and Syria and has been recorded in the Anti-Lebanon Mountains.
