= Acantholimon alberti =

Scientific classification
- Kingdom: Plantae
- Clade: Tracheophytes
- Clade: Angiosperms
- Clade: Eudicots
- Order: Caryophyllales
- Family: Plumbaginaceae
- Genus: Acantholimon
- Species: A. alberti

Binomial name
- Acantholimon alberti Regel

Species of flowering plant

Acantholimon alberti is a species of flowering plant in the family Plumbaginaceae. The native range of this species is Central Asia (Tian Shan Mountains), it is a subshrub and grows primarily in the temperate biome and was described by Regel.

== See also ==
- List of Acantholimon species
