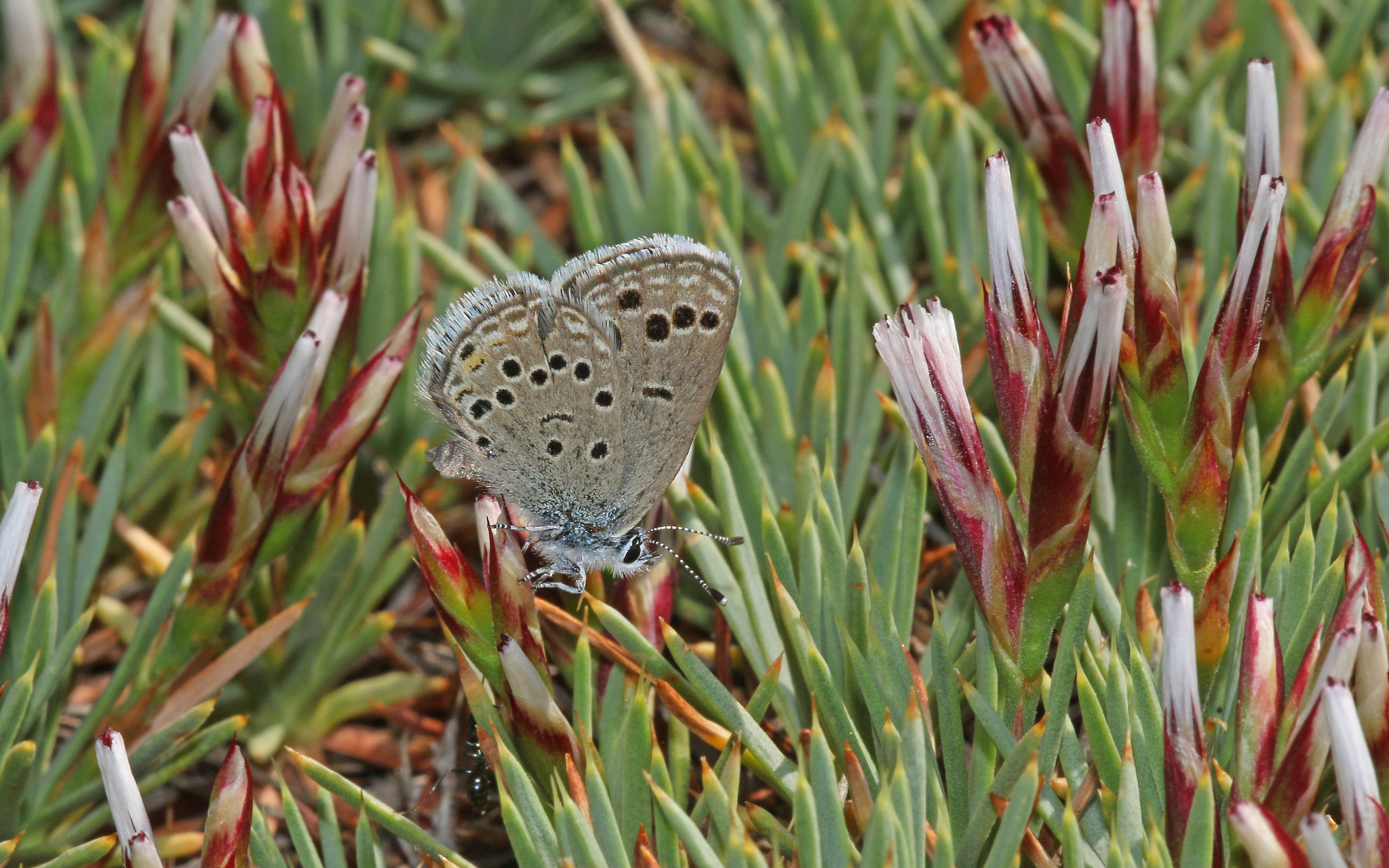

Conservation status
- Near Threatened (IUCN 3.1)

Scientific classification
- Kingdom: Animalia
- Phylum: Arthropoda
- Class: Insecta
- Order: Lepidoptera
- Family: Lycaenidae
- Genus: Turanana
- Species: T. taygetica

Binomial name
- Turanana taygetica (Rebel, 1902)

Synonyms
- Lycaena panagaea taygetica Rebel, 1902

= Turanana taygetica =

Species of butterfly

Turanana taygetica is a butterfly of the family Lycaenidae. It was described by Rebel in 1902. It is found in Greece and Turkey.

The length of the forewings is 10–12 mm.

The larvae probably feed on Acantholimon species.

== Subspecies ==
- Turanana taygetica taygetica (Greece: Peloponnese)
- Turanana taygetica endymionoides Coutsis, 2004 (western Asiatic Turkey, Greece: Peloponnese)
