= Acantholimon tataricum =

Scientific classification
- Kingdom: Plantae
- Clade: Tracheophytes
- Clade: Angiosperms
- Clade: Eudicots
- Order: Caryophyllales
- Family: Plumbaginaceae
- Genus: Acantholimon
- Species: A. tataricum

Binomial name
- Acantholimon tataricum Boiss.

Species of flowering plant

Acantholimon tataricum is a species of flowering plant in the family Plumbaginaceae. The native range of this species is in Xinjiang and the Western Himalayas and it was discovered by Boiss.

== See also ==
- List of Acantholimon species
