= Buhse =

Buhse or Bühse is a surname. Notable people with this surname include:

- Friedrich Alexander Buhse (1821–1898), Baltic-German botanist
- Rudolf Buhse (1905–1997), German military officer
- Werner Bühse (born 1951), German sports shooter
