= Acantholimon schemachense =

Scientific classification
- Kingdom: Plantae
- Clade: Tracheophytes
- Clade: Angiosperms
- Clade: Eudicots
- Order: Caryophyllales
- Family: Plumbaginaceae
- Genus: Acantholimon
- Species: A. schemachense

Binomial name
- Acantholimon schemachense Gross.

Species of flowering plant

Acantholimon schemachense is a species of flowering plant in the Plumbaginaceae family. The native range of this species is in the North Caucasus and the Transcaucasus, and it was described by Gross in 1931.

== See also ==
- List of Acantholimon species
