= Acantholimon acmostegium =

Scientific classification
- Kingdom: Plantae
- Clade: Tracheophytes
- Clade: Angiosperms
- Clade: Eudicots
- Order: Caryophyllales
- Family: Plumbaginaceae
- Genus: Acantholimon
- Species: A. acmostegium

Binomial name
- Acantholimon acmostegium Boiss. & Buhse

Species of flowering plant

Acantholimon acmostegium is a species of Plumbaginaceae that occurs in Iran. The species was described by Pierre Edmond Boissier and Friedrich Alexander Buhse in 1860.
