= Acantholimon venustum =

Scientific classification
- Kingdom: Plantae
- Clade: Tracheophytes
- Clade: Angiosperms
- Clade: Eudicots
- Order: Caryophyllales
- Family: Plumbaginaceae
- Genus: Acantholimon
- Species: A. venustum

Binomial name
- Acantholimon venustum Boiss.

Species of flowering plant

Acantholimon venustum is a species of flowering plant in the family Plumbaginaceae. The native range of this species is from Turkey to Iran and West Syria, it is a subshrub and grows primarily in the temperate biome and was described by Boiss. The plant is a broadleaf evergreen perennial with blue foliage, In the spring, white flowers emerge. The plant is also known as prickly thrift.

== See also ==
- List of Acantholimon species
