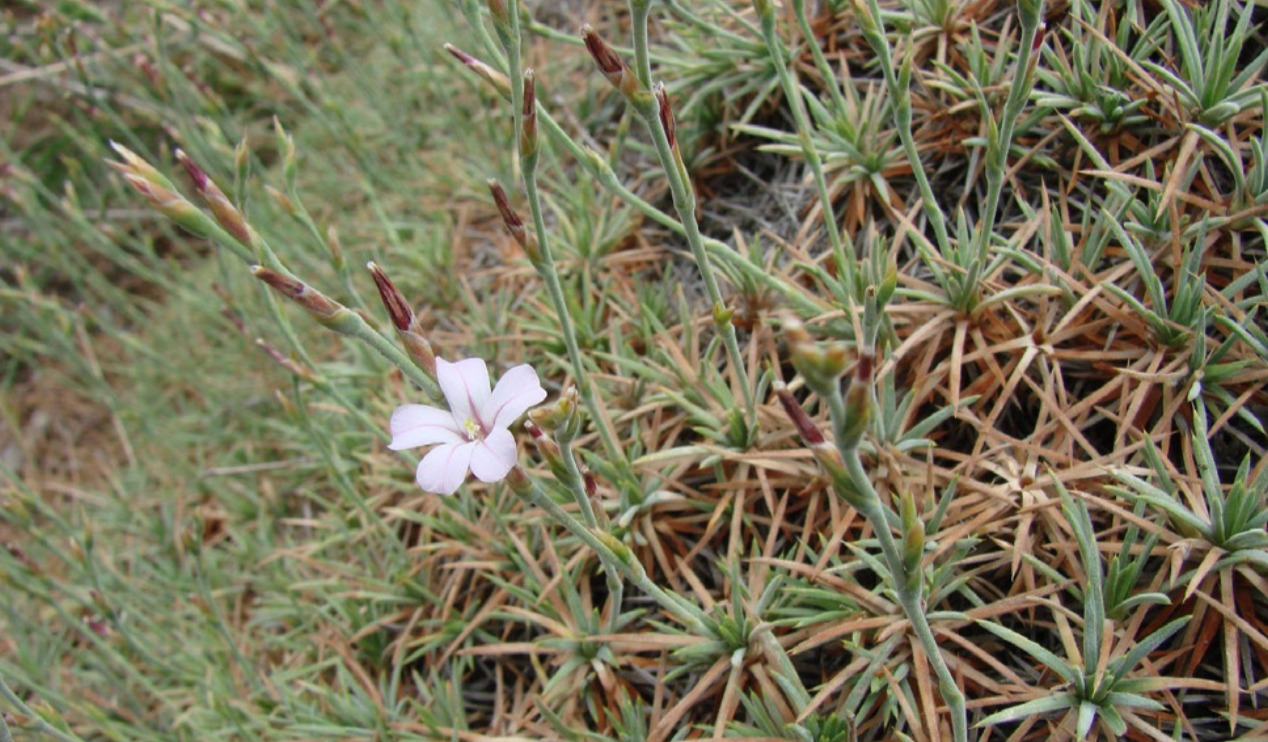

Scientific classification
- Kingdom: Plantae
- Clade: Tracheophytes
- Clade: Angiosperms
- Clade: Eudicots
- Order: Caryophyllales
- Family: Plumbaginaceae
- Genus: Acantholimon
- Species: A. zakirovii

Binomial name
- Acantholimon zakirovii Beshko (2015)

= Acantholimon zakirovii =

Species of flowering plant

Acantholimon zakirovii is a species of flowering plant in the family Plumbaginaceae. The native range of this species is Uzbekistan. It is a subshrub and grows primarily in the subalpine or subarctic biome and was described by Beshko.
