= Acantholimon zaeifii =

Scientific classification
- Kingdom: Plantae
- Clade: Tracheophytes
- Clade: Angiosperms
- Clade: Eudicots
- Order: Caryophyllales
- Family: Plumbaginaceae
- Genus: Acantholimon
- Species: A. zaeifii

Binomial name
- Acantholimon zaeifii Assadi

Species of flowering plant

Acantholimon zaeifii is a species of flowering plant in the family Plumbaginaceae. The native range of this species is Iran. It is a subshrub and grows primarily in the temperate biome and was described by Assadi.
