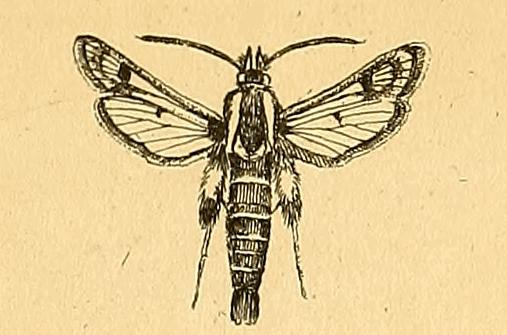

Scientific classification
- Domain: Eukaryota
- Kingdom: Animalia
- Phylum: Arthropoda
- Class: Insecta
- Order: Lepidoptera
- Family: Sesiidae
- Genus: Dipchasphecia
- Species: D. lanipes

Binomial name
- Dipchasphecia lanipes (Lederer, 1863)

Synonyms
- Sesia lanipes Lederer, 1863; Chamaesphecia lanipes

= Dipchasphecia lanipes =

Species of moth

Dipchasphecia lanipes is a moth of the family Sesiidae. It is found in Bulgaria and Asia Minor.

The larvae possibly feed on Plumbaginaceae and/or Caryophyllaceae species.
