= Acantholimon gabrieljaniae =

Conservation status
- Data Deficient (IUCN 3.1)

Scientific classification
- Kingdom: Plantae
- Clade: Tracheophytes
- Clade: Angiosperms
- Clade: Eudicots
- Order: Caryophyllales
- Family: Plumbaginaceae
- Genus: Acantholimon
- Species: A. gabrieljaniae

Binomial name
- Acantholimon gabrieljaniae Mirzoeva

Species of flowering plant

Acantholimon gabrieljaniae, or Gabrielyan's prickly thrift, is a species of leadwort that is endemic to Armenia. It is found only in the Sevan floristic region, and is only known from its type specimen. It may be related or synonymous to A. bracteatum. It grows on limestone slopes at elevations around 2,000 m. It is threatened by nomadic livestock farming, which can degrade and destroy its habitat. The type specimen was found in the Sevan National Park, and so is afforded some protection.
