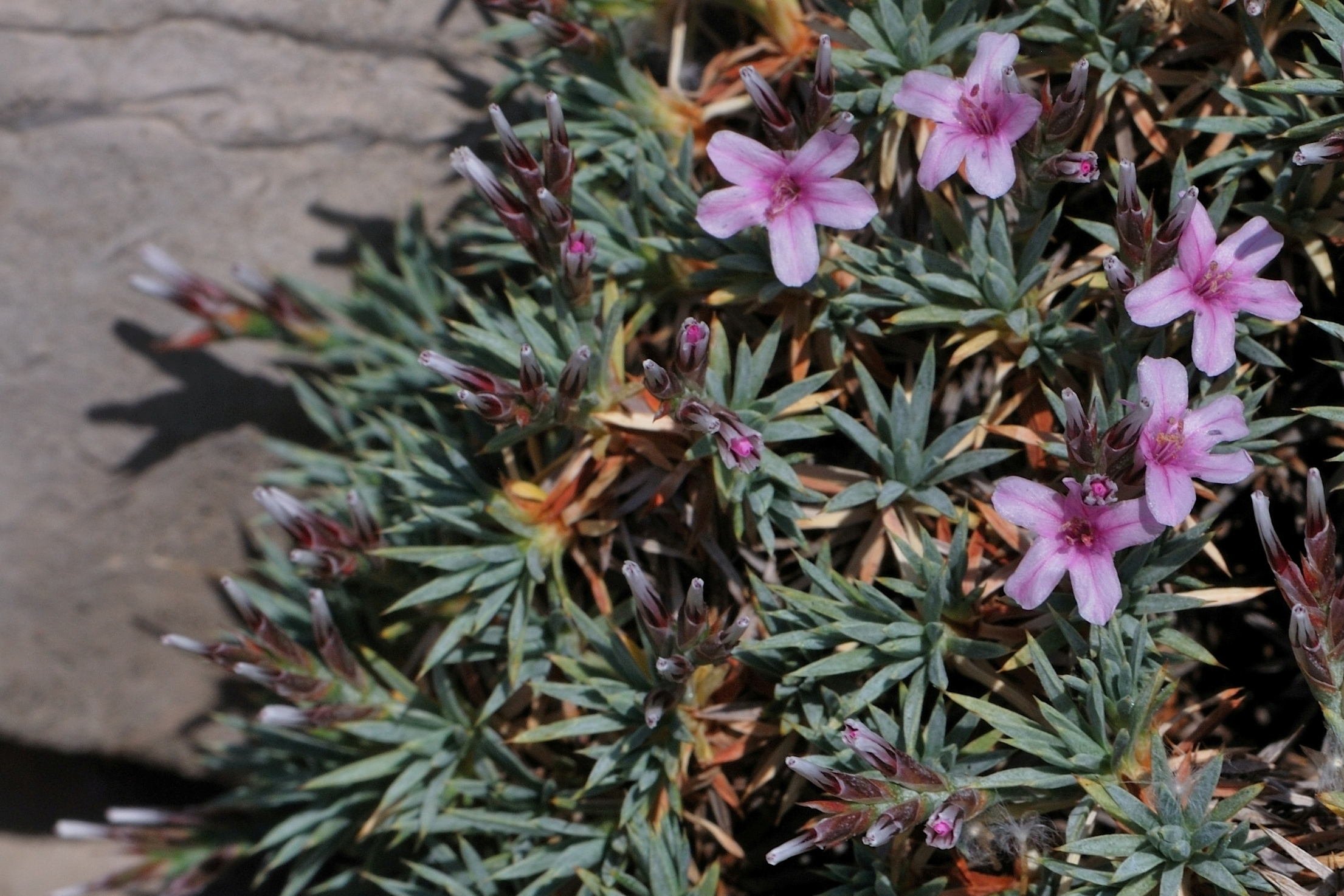

Scientific classification
- Kingdom: Plantae
- Clade: Embryophytes
- Clade: Tracheophytes
- Clade: Angiosperms
- Clade: Eudicots
- Order: Caryophyllales
- Family: Plumbaginaceae
- Genus: Acantholimon
- Species: A. libanoticum

Binomial name
- Acantholimon libanoticum Boiss.

Synonyms
- Armeriastrum libanoticum Kuntze; Acantholimon caryophyllaceum var. brachystachium Boiss.

= Acantholimon libanoticum =

Species of flowering plant

Acantholimon libanoticum (Lebanese prickly thrift, غملول لبناني) is a plant in the family Plumbaginaceae first described by Pierre Edmond Boissier. It is native to Western Asia from Turkey to Syria and Lebanon.

== Description ==
Acantholimon libanoticum is evergreen. The simple leaves are alternate. They are acicular with entire margins. It flowers from July to August.
