= Rudolf Buhse =

West German army general (1905-1997)

- Born: 10 April 1905; Graudenz
- Died: 26 November 1997 (aged 92); Tutzing
- Military career
- Allegiance: Weimar Republic (to 1933); Nazi Germany (to 1945); West Germany
- Branch: Army
- Service years: 1924–45; 1956–62
- Rank: Oberst (Wehrmacht); Brigadegeneral (Bundeswehr)
- Conflicts: World War II
- Awards: Knight's Cross of the Iron Cross

Rudolf Gustav Buhse (10 April 1905 – 26 November 1997) was an officer in the Wehrmacht of Nazi Germany during World War II and a Brigadegeneral in Bundeswehr. He was a recipient of the Knight's Cross of the Iron Cross. Buhse surrendered to the Allied troops during the fall of Tunisia in 1943.

== Post-war ==
Buhse was released in 1946, he joined the West German Bundeswehr on 1 September 1956 (rank Oberst). He headed the commission for the admission of former Wehrmacht soldiers into the Bundeswehr in Hannover and later worked in the Federal Ministry of Defence in Bonn. From 1 July 1959 to 31 October 1960 he commanded the Panzergrenadierbrigade 2 in Braunschweig and became commander of the Infantry school in Hammelburg on 1 November 1960 (promoted to Brigadegeneral in December 1960). Buhse retired on 30 September 1962.

== Awards and decorations ==
- Knight's Cross of the Iron Cross on 17 August 1942 as Oberstleutnant and commander of Infanterie-Regiment 47
- Grand Merit Cross of the Federal Republic of Germany (Bundesverdienstkreuz) (13 September 1962)
