= Mogens Engell Køie =

Danish botanist and professor (1911–2000)

Mogens Engell Køie (February 4, 1911 – May 21, 2000) was a Danish botanist and ecologist, and the first professor of ecological botany at the University of Copenhagen.

== Biography ==
Mogens Køie was born in Copenhagen but grew up and attended high school in Rønne on the island of Bornholm. He studied at the University of Copenhagen, earning a master's degree in botany in 1936. In 1938, he was employed at the Botanical Laboratory, becoming an assistant professor in 1944. He defended his doctoral dissertation in 1951 and was appointed as a lecturer in 1956.

Early in his career, Køie participated in classic style expeditions, including Henning Haslund-Christensen’s Third Central Asian Expedition to Afghanistan in 1948-1949. Later, his research focused on the relationship between plants and their environment, particularly trace metals in soil, such as lithium.

== Academic contributions ==
Køie was a co-founder of the Nordic Society Oikos and a member of the editorial committee for the society’s scientific journal Oikos from its inception in 1949. He served as chairman of the Danish Botanical Society from 1966 to 1970 and was also a member of the Danish UNESCO National Committee.

== Legacy ==
His research contributed to a deeper understanding of plant ecology in Denmark and the Nordic region. Køie’s work remains an essential part of botanical education and research in Scandinavia.

== Selected publications ==
- 1938. The soil vegetation of the Danish conifer plantations of its ecology. Kongelige Danske Videnskabernes Selskabs Skrifter – Naturvidenskabelig og Mathematisk Afdeling, 9.ª ed. vol. VII (2): 1-86
- 1943. Tøj fra yngre Bronzealder fremstillet af Stor Nælde (Utrica dioeca L.). Aarbøger for nordisk Oldkyndighed og Historie
- kai Gram, c.a. Jørgensen, m. Køie. 1944. De jydske Egekrat og deres Flora. Biologiske Skrifter, Det Kongelige Danske Videnskabernes Selskab 3 (3). 210 pp.
- m. Köie. 1951. Relations of vegetation, soil and subsoil in Denmark. Dansk Botanisk Arkiv 15 (5)
- --------, karl h. Rechinger. 1954. Symbolae Afghanicae: enumeration and descriptions of the plants collected by L. Edelberg and M. Køie on "The 3rd Danish Expedition to Central Asia" and by W. Koelz, H.F. Neubauer, O.H. Volk, and others in Afghanistan. Biologiske Skrifter, Det Kongelige Danske Videnskabernes Selskab 8 (1)
- marie Hammer, m. Køie, r. Spärck. 1955. Undersøgelser over ernæringen hos agerhøns, fasaner og urfugle i Danmark. Danske Vildtundersøgelser 4. Aarhus, 22 pp.

== Honors ==
=== Eponyms ===
- (Acanthaceae) Dicliptera koiei Leonard
- (Asteraceae) Cousinia koieana Bornm.
- (Lamiaceae) Nepeta koieana Rech.f.
- (Salicaceae) Salix × koiei Kimura
