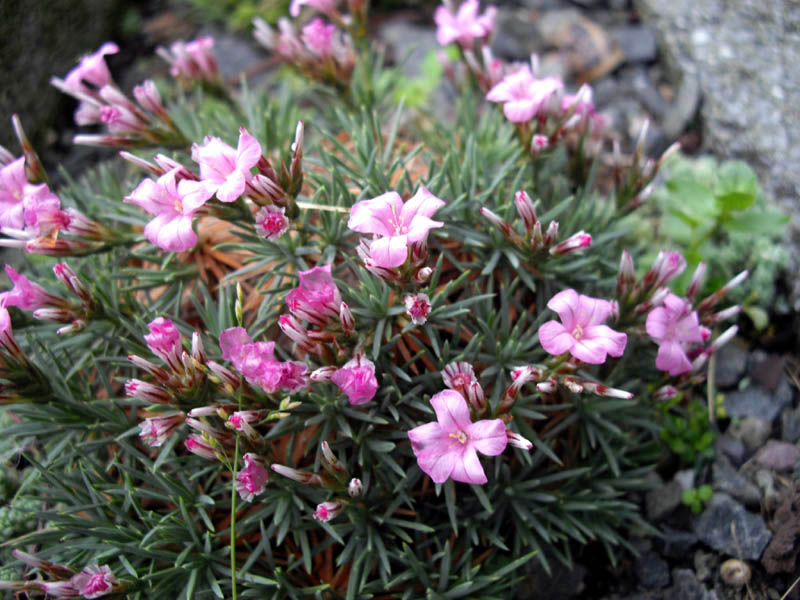

Scientific classification
- Kingdom: Plantae
- Clade: Embryophytes
- Clade: Tracheophytes
- Clade: Spermatophytes
- Clade: Angiosperms
- Clade: Eudicots
- Order: Caryophyllales
- Family: Plumbaginaceae
- Genus: Acantholimon
- Species: A. ulicinum

Binomial name
- Acantholimon ulicinum (Willd. ex Schult.) Boiss.

Synonyms
- Armeriastrum ulicinum (Willd. ex Schult.) Kuntze; Statice ulicina Willd. ex Schult.

= Acantholimon ulicinum =

Species of broadleaf evergreen plant

Acantholimon ulicinum (ulicinum: yoo-lih-SEE-num), also known as the prickly thrift, is a species of broadleaf evergreen plants in the family Plumbaginaceae. Acantholimon ulicinum is around 10 cm (4 in) tall and has a spread of 30 cm (1 ft). The species is endemic to the eastern Mediterranean region (Greece, the Balkans and Turkey) where it grows in dry soil. From June to July is when Acantholimon ulicinum blooms, with pale pink flowers. It has crowded, rigid, hard-textured, spiny-tipped, linear and needle-like leaves, and five-petaled pink flowers in short-stalked inflorescences.
