= Pimenov =

Pimenov (masculine, Russian: Пименов) or Pimenova (feminine, Russian: Пименова) is a Russian surname. Notable people with the surname include:

- Kristina Pimenova (born 2005), Russian fashion model, daughter of Ruslan
- Mikhail Pimenov (born 1983), Russian soccer player
- Nikolaj Pimenov (born 1997), Serbian rower
- Nikolay Pimenov (born 1958), Russian rower
- Ruslan Pimenov (born 1981), Russian soccer player, father of Kristina
- Sergei Pimenov (born 1969), Russian soccer player
- Stepan Pimenov (1784–1833), Russian artist and sculptor
- Yuri Pimenov (1903–1977), Russian paonter
- Yuriy Pimenov (1958–2019), Russian rower
- Vyacheslav Pimenov (born 1991), Russian triathlete
