= Acantholimon koeycegizicum =

Scientific classification
- Kingdom: Plantae
- Clade: Embryophytes
- Clade: Tracheophytes
- Clade: Spermatophytes
- Clade: Angiosperms
- Clade: Eudicots
- Order: Caryophyllales
- Family: Plumbaginaceae
- Genus: Acantholimon
- Species: A. koeycegizicum

Binomial name
- Acantholimon koeycegizicum Doğan & Akaydın

Species of flowering plant

Acantholimon koeycegizicum, is a species of plant belonging to the family Plumbaginaceae.

It is only found in coastal regions of southwestern Anatolia (Turkey), often associated with forests of Turkish pine. It is a robust, rather spiny shrublet which produces dense spikes of pink flowers borne on long (up to 30 cm) scapes. Flowering occurs in July and August.
