= Ivan Novopokrovskiy =

Botanist

Ivan Vasilyevich Novopokrovskiy
- Born: Ivan Vasilyevich Novopokrovskiy; Иван Васильевич Новопокровский; 7 December 1880; Mikhaylov
- Died: 30 May 1951 (aged 70); Rostov-on-Don
- Occupation: botanist

Ivan Vasilyevich Novopokrovskiy (Russian: Иван Васильевич Новопокровский; 7 December 1880, Mikhaylov — 30 May 1951, Rostov-on-Don) was a botanist and a specialist in the field of botanical geography and systematics of higher plants.

== Biography ==
Ivan Vasilyevich Novopokrovskiy was born on 7 December 1880 in Mikhaylov (present-day Ryazan Oblast). In 1904 he graduated from the Natural Department of the Physics and Mathematics Faculty of Moscow University. In 1920—1931 he was a Professor in Novocherkassk Institute of Agriculture and Melioration. Until 1934 he was a professor at Krasnodar Agricultural Institute.

From 1934 to 1944 he worked in Rostov-on-Don State University (RSU), where he was the head of the Department of Botanics and Dean of the Faculty of Biology. In 1936 he founded (with the participation of Professors A. Flerov and V. N. Vershkovsky) Herbarium of the Rostov University.

He also worked at Donskoy Polytechnic Institute (Novocherkassk) and in the North Caucasus Department of the State Institute for the Study of Arid Regions. Since 1945 he worked at the Botanical Institute of the USSR Academy of Sciences (Leningrad), where he was in charge of the Central Asian herbarium.

In the years 1935—1942 he was persecuted by the Stalin regime.

He spoke several foreign languages.

=== Scientific work ===
Novopokrovskiy studied flora and vegetation of the southeastern European part of the USSR. He is today known for his work on the systematics of some genera of plants from the family of Compositae and the family of Broomrape, among which he described many new species. He is the author of more than 120 scientific works, including "Zonal types of steppes of the European part of the USSR", "Vegetation of the Rostov region", "Quarantine weeds of the Rostov region".

== Memory ==
In 1985, in connection with the 70th anniversary of Rostov State University and in recognition of Ivan Novopokrovsky's merits for the organization of the University's herbarium, the Herbarium of Rostov University was named after him. This is one of the largest herbariums in whole of Russia.
