= Acantholimon riyatguelii =

Scientific classification
- Kingdom: Plantae
- Clade: Tracheophytes
- Clade: Angiosperms
- Clade: Eudicots
- Order: Caryophyllales
- Family: Plumbaginaceae
- Genus: Acantholimon
- Species: A. riyatguelii

Binomial name
- Acantholimon riyatguelii Yildirim (2014)

Species of flowering plant

Acantholimon riyatguelii is a species of flowering plant in the family Plumbaginaceae. The native range of this species is in Turkey and Iran. It was first described by Hasan Yıldırım in 2014.
