= Moisey Kirpichnikov =

Soviet botanist

Moisey Elevich Kirpicznikov
- Born: 5 June 1913; Gomel, Russian Empire
- Died: 18 May 1995 (aged 81); Saint Petersburg, Russia
- Scientific career
- Fields: Botany
- Workplaces: Komarov Botanical Institute
- Author abbrev. (botany): Kirp.

Moisey Elevich Kirpicznikov (Russian: Моисей Э́льевич Кирпичников) (5 June 1913 - 18 May 1995) was a Soviet botanist. The standard author abbreviation Kirp. is used to indicate this person as the author when citing a botanical name.
