= Acantholimon vedicum =

Conservation status
- Data Deficient (IUCN 3.1)

Scientific classification
- Kingdom: Plantae
- Clade: Tracheophytes
- Clade: Angiosperms
- Clade: Eudicots
- Order: Caryophyllales
- Family: Plumbaginaceae
- Genus: Acantholimon
- Species: A. vedicum

Binomial name
- Acantholimon vedicum Mirzoeva

Species of flowering plant

Acantholimon vedicum, the Vedian prickly thrift, is a species of leadwort that is endemic to central Armenia, and is only found in the Yerevan floristic region, on the limestone massif Erakh between elevations of 900–1,000 m, close to the city of Vedi. It is only known from its type specimens, and little is known of this species. It is threatened by nomadic livestock farming, which can lead to habitat loss and degradation.
