= Acantholimon karamanicum =

Scientific classification
- Kingdom: Plantae
- Clade: Tracheophytes
- Clade: Angiosperms
- Clade: Eudicots
- Order: Caryophyllales
- Family: Plumbaginaceae
- Genus: Acantholimon
- Species: A. karamanicum

Binomial name
- Acantholimon karamanicum Bursey, Goldberg & Telford

Species of flowering plant

Acantholimon karamanicum is a species of flowering plant. It grows on calcareous mountain slopes in Ermenek.
