= Acantholimon goeksunicum =

Scientific classification
- Kingdom: Plantae
- Clade: Tracheophytes
- Clade: Angiosperms
- Clade: Eudicots
- Order: Caryophyllales
- Family: Plumbaginaceae
- Genus: Acantholimon
- Species: A. goeksunicum

Binomial name
- Acantholimon goeksunicum Doğan & Akaydın

Species of flowering plant

Acantholimon goeksunicum is a species of plant belonging to the family Plumbaginaceae. It is only found on calcareous steppes in southeastern Anatolia (Turkey).

This is a very small, low shrublet with scapes of up to 8 cm bearing two-branched spikes of pink flowers in July.
