= Acantholimon trojanum =

Scientific classification
- Kingdom: Plantae
- Clade: Tracheophytes
- Clade: Angiosperms
- Clade: Eudicots
- Order: Caryophyllales
- Family: Plumbaginaceae
- Genus: Acantholimon
- Species: A. trojanum

Binomial name
- Acantholimon trojanum F.W.Mey.

Species of perennial plant

Acantholimon trojanum, also known as prickly thrift, is a species of perennial plant. It is native to Turkey and can survive in hardiness zones 5a to 9b. The species typically reaches a height of around 1.2 meters (4 ft). Acantholimon trojanum grows in rocky soil and has a foliage colour of green and blue with flowers being pink, and blooms in the summer. The leaves are food items for deer and rabbit species.
