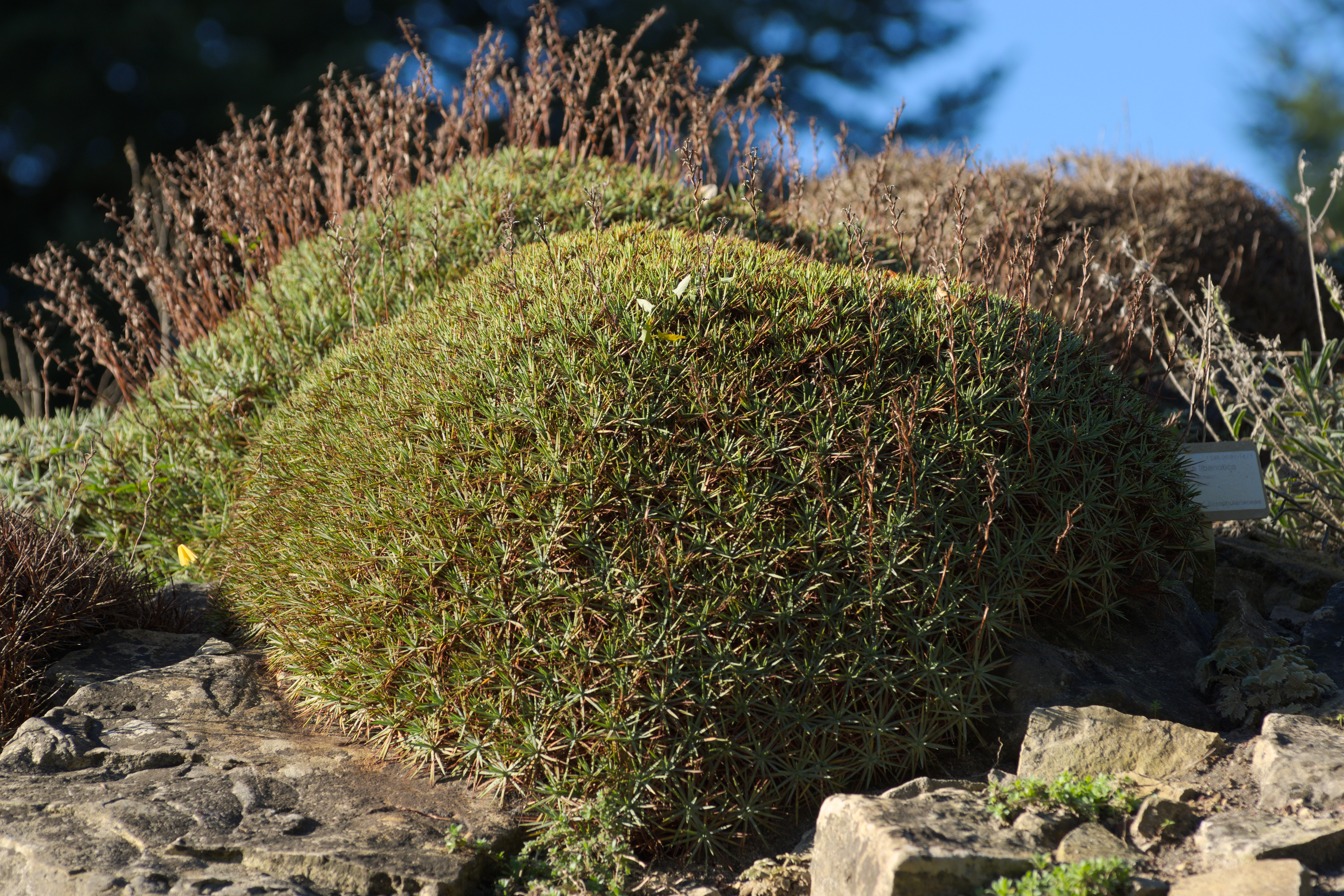

Scientific classification
- Kingdom: Plantae
- Clade: Tracheophytes
- Clade: Angiosperms
- Clade: Eudicots
- Order: Caryophyllales
- Family: Plumbaginaceae
- Genus: Acantholimon
- Species: A. acerosum

Binomial name
- Acantholimon acerosum (Willd.) Boiss.

= Acantholimon acerosum =

Species of flowering plant

Acantholimon acerosum is a species of plant in the Plumbaginaceae family that is native from Turkey to Northwest Iran. The species are evergreen and sprout flowers June. Acantholimon acerosum grows in light well drained soil that is gritty and limey.
