= Acantholimon ekatherinae =

Scientific classification
- Kingdom: Plantae
- Clade: Tracheophytes
- Clade: Angiosperms
- Clade: Eudicots
- Order: Caryophyllales
- Family: Plumbaginaceae
- Genus: Acantholimon
- Species: A. ekatherinae

Binomial name
- Acantholimon ekatherinae (O.Fedtsch.) Czerniak.

Species of flowering plant

Acantholimon ekatherinae is a species of Plumbaginaceae in the genus Acantholimon. It native to Kazakhstan and Uzbekistan in central Asia.
