= Mikhail Grigorevich Popov =

- Born: 5(17) April 1893; Volsk, Saratov Oblast, Russia
- Died: 18 December 1955 (aged 62); Leningrad, Russia
- Scientific career
- Fields: Botany, Geobotany
- Workplaces: Saratov University, Tashkent University, All-Union Institute of Horticulture, Kazakhstan branch of the Academy of Sciences of the USSR, Batumi Botanical Garden
- Author abbrev. (botany): Popov

Mikhail Grigorevich Popov (Russian: Михаил Григорьевич Попов) (5(17) April, 1893 – 18 December, 1955) was a Soviet botanist. He is known for developing a theory on the role of hybridization in plant evolution, and studying the flora of the Soviet Union and Eastern Europe. The standard author abbreviation Popov is used to indicate this person as the author when citing a botanical name.

== Eponyms ==
- Popoviocodonia Fed. 1957 Campanulaceae
- Popoviolimon Lincz. Plumbaginaceae
