= Karl Heinz Rechinger =

Austrian botanist (1906–1998)

Professor Karl Heinz Rechinger HonFRSE
- Born: 16 October 1906; Vienna, Austria
- Died: 30 December 1998 (aged 92); Vienna, Austria
- Scientific career
- Fields: Botany, phytogeography

Karl Heinz Rechinger (16 October 1906, Vienna – 30 December 1998, Vienna) was an Austrian botanist and phytogeographer.

== Life ==
Karl Heinz Rechinger was born in Vienna on 16 October 1906. He was the son of Dr Karl Rechinger, then assistant at the Department of Botany in the Imperial Natural History Museum, and Rosa Elisabeth (Lily) Rechinger. Karl Heinz was raised in a refined, well-to-do Viennese family surrounded by art, music and science. He attended the prestigious Schottengymnasium in Vienna. Importantly, his father introduced him to botany, specimen collecting and how to carefully observe nature - activities that would shape his life and career.

He accompanied his father on botanical excursions around Vienna, and learnt how to prepare and handle specimens, interpret labels and identify handwriting for material they brought back to a small private herbarium within their house.

Rechinger married twice. He had two children with his second wife Wilhelmina.

== Career ==
Rechinger studied botany, geography and geology at the University of Vienna. During this time, he began writing a thesis that revised part of the genus Rumex, and also worked as a paid demonstrator under Richard Wettstein in Vienna's Institute of Botany. He was awarded his Doctor of Philosophy on 15 May 1931. Despite an economic recession, he continued to work in the Department of Botany after graduating in volunteer or low-paid roles.

In the early 1930s, Rechinger undertook many botanical excursions to Croatia, Greece, and the former Yugoslavia. Although only in his late-20s, he quickly became an expert on the flora of the Balkan Peninsula, having collected extensively from most countries in the area. In 1937, he was appointed provisional scientific assistant at the Natural History Museum in Vienna, where he would work for almost 35 years until his retirement in 1971. He was the museum's director from 1961 to 1971. Throughout this tenure, Rechinger continued to undertake botanical work. He travelled extensively in Iran, where he collected an impressive number of specimens. He also met and exchanged ideas with prominent contemporaries such as Heinrich Carl Haussknecht and Joseph Friedrich Nicolaus Bornmüller. Following the Anschluss, in which Nazi Germany annexed Austria in 1938, Rechinger was submitted to basic military training before serving as a clerk.

Allied air raids against Berlin resulted in the almost complete destruction of the Botanical Museum Berlin-Dahlem, and also led to the evacuation of specimens from the Natural History Museum in Vienna. Rechinger was not involved in evacuating the specimens, but the museum was empty when he returned from military service. In a twist of fate, his temporary position at the Natural History Museum was made permanent in 1943.

After the war, he continued to work at the Natural History Museum and also wrote several papers, including "Phytogeographia aegea". In this paper, he proposed the idea of a phytogeographical border between Europe and Asia, which has since become known as "Rechinger's line".

In 1953, Rechinger visited the United States on a Fulbright Scholarship. There, he worked for three months at the herbarium of the New York Botanical Garden on the genus Rumex.

He made important contributions involving flora native to Southwestern Asia and Greece, being recognized for his work on Flora Iranica and as the author of Flora Aegaea. As a taxonomist, he described many species of plants.

Rechinger was also a lecturer of botany at the University of Vienna, and in 1956–57 was a visiting professor in Baghdad, where he founded a herbarium. With Nicholas Vladimir Polunin he edited the exsiccata Exsiccatae ex Herb. Univ. Baghdadensis. Cent. Prim. Fide K. H. Rechinger, Edit. N. Polunin. He was in 1971 elected a member of the Royal Swedish Academy of Sciences.

He retired from lecturing in 1971, but carried on with his plant explorations. He went to Iran in 1977. He also collected in Western Australia in 1982, Indonesia in 1985, Chile in 1987 and Sri Lanka in 1990. He went deaf in old age.

In 1986, Scottish botanist Ian Charleson Hedge and Karl Rechinger published Plant life of South-West Asia by the Royal Society of Edinburgh, It was based on a symposium that was dedicated to Karl Heinz Rechinger on his eightieth birthday.

He died on 30 December 1998.

== Botanical specimens ==
Botanical specimens collected by Rechinger are held at herbaria around the world, including the National Herbarium of Victoria at the Royal Botanic Gardens Victoria, Harvard University Herbaria, and the Swedish Museum of Natural History.

== Publications ==
- Flora Aegaea (1944)
- Flora of Lower Iraq (1967)
- Flora Iranica (1998)

== Eponymy ==
The lichen genus Rechingeria, the fungus genus Rechingeriella, the plant taxa Androcymbium rechingeri, Carthamus rechingeri, Centaurea rechingeri, Erysimum rechingeri, Campanula rechingeri, Paronychia rechingeri, Euphorbia rechingeri, Onosma kaheirei, Trifolium rechingeri, Stipa rechingeri, Trisetum rechingeri and the land snail Albinaria rechingeri are named in his honor. He also collected reptiles on his journeys, including two species and one subspecies that were named after him; Elaphe rechingeri (now treated as synonym of Elaphe quatuorlineata), Eirenis rechingeri and Podarcis erhardii rechingeri.

== See also ==
- Category:Taxa named by Karl Heinz Rechinger
