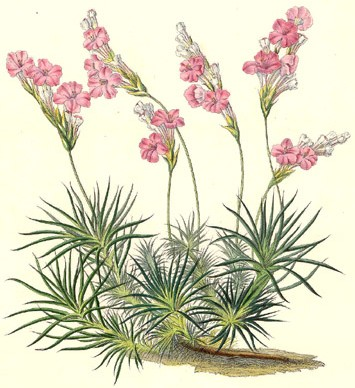
- Acantholimon glumaceum

Scientific classification
- Kingdom: Plantae
- Clade: Embryophytes
- Clade: Tracheophytes
- Clade: Angiosperms
- Clade: Eudicots
- Order: Caryophyllales
- Family: Plumbaginaceae
- Genus: Acantholimon; Boiss. (1846), nom. cons.

Species
- 321; see text

Synonyms
- Armeriastrum Lindl. (1847); Chaetolimon (Bunge) Lincz. (1938 publ. 1940); Chomutowia B.Fedtsch. (1922); Ghaznianthus Linchevskii (1979); Gladiolimon Mobayen (1964); Vassilczenkoa Lincz. (1979)

= Acantholimon =

Genus of flowering plants

Acantholimon (prickly thrift) is a genus of small flowering plants within the plumbago or leadwort family, Plumbaginaceae. They are distributed from southeastern Europe to central Asia, and also cultivated elsewhere in rock gardens.

== Form ==
The evergreen subshrubs are generally cushion to mat-forming, with densely tufted shoots bearing mostly awl (long, pointed spike) to needle or grass-like, prickle to spine-tipped hard-textured leaves. They have shortish, simple or branched flower stems which can be loose or dense. The summer-borne flowers are composed of a funnel-shaped calyx, usually with a flared membranous margin, and five spreading petals.

== Species ==
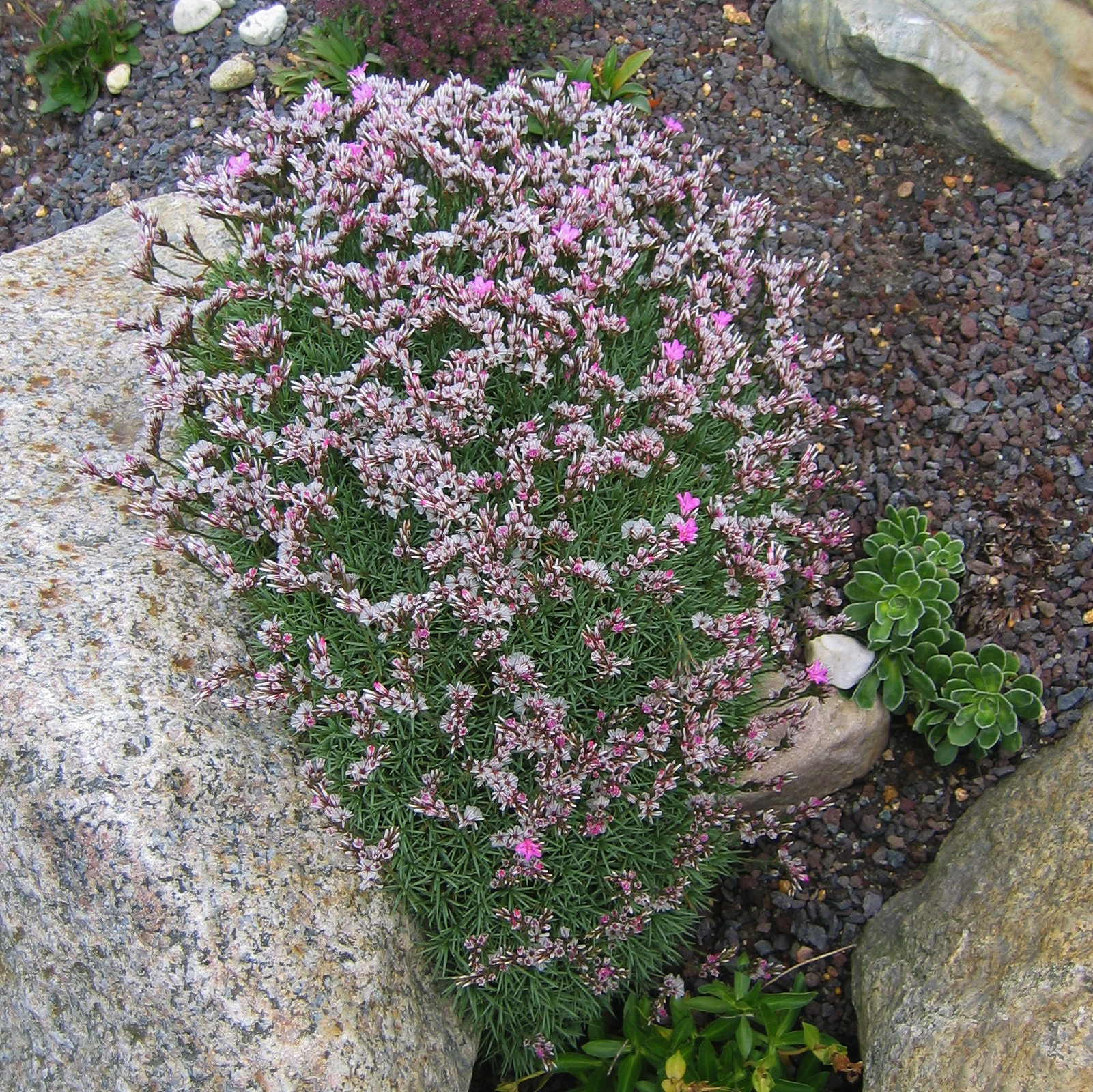
Acantholimon sp.

321 species are currently accepted. Selected species of Acantholimon include:

- Acantholimon acanthobryum
- Acantholimon acerosum
- Acantholimon acmostegium
- Acantholimon afanassievii
- Acantholimon alberti
- Acantholimon anatolicum
- Acantholimon armenum
- Acantholimon artosense
- Acantholimon avenaceum
- Acantholimon bashkaleicum
- Acantholimon birandii
- Acantholimon calvertii
- Acantholimon capitatum
- Acantholimon collare
- Acantholimon davisii
- Acantholimon doganii
- Acantholimon ekatherinae
- Acantholimon gabrieljaniae
- Acantholimon gillii
- Acantholimon glumaceum
- Acantholimon goeksunicum
- Acantholimon hoshapicum
- Acantholimon ibrahimii
- Acantholimon karamanicum
- Acantholimon koeycegizicum
- Acantholimon kotschyi
- Acantholimon libanoticum
- Acantholimon riyatguelii
- Acantholimon schemachense
- Acantholimon tataricum
- Acantholimon trojanum
- Acantholimon turcicum
- Acantholimon ulicinum
- Acantholimon vedicum
- Acantholimon venustum
- Acantholimon yildizelicum
