= Brumaire =

2nd month of the French Republican calendar

Brumaire (French pronunciation: [bʁymɛʁ]) was the second month in the French Republican calendar. The month was named after the French brume 'fog', which occurs frequently in France at that time of the year. Brumaire was the second month of the autumn quarter (mois d'automne). It started between 22 October and 24 October, ending between 20 November and 22 November. It follows Vendémiaire and precedes Frimaire.

In political/historical usage, Brumaire can refer to the coup of 18 Brumaire in the year VIII (9 November 1799), by which General Napoleon Bonaparte overthrew the government of the Directory to replace it with the Consulate, as referenced by Karl Marx in his pamphlet, The Eighteenth Brumaire of Louis Bonaparte, in which Marx parallels Napoleon's original coup with the later 1851 Coup of his nephew, Louis-Napoleon.

Year: 3
Month: Brumaire
Year: III

Weekday:
Primidi
Duodi
Tridi
Quartidi
Quintidi
Sextidi
Septidi
Octidi
Nonidi
Décadi

décade 4
1	Wednesday; 22 October 1794
2	Thursday; 23 October 1794
3	Friday; 24 October 1794
4	Saturday; 25 October 1794
5	Sunday; 26 October 1794
6	Monday; 27 October 1794
7	Tuesday; 28 October 1794
8	Wednesday; 29 October 1794
9	Thursday; 30 October 1794
10	Friday; 31 October 1794

décade 5
11	Saturday; 1 November 1794
12	Sunday; 2 November 1794
13	Monday; 3 November 1794
14	Tuesday; 4 November 1794
15	Wednesday; 5 November 1794
16	Thursday; 6 November 1794
17	Friday; 7 November 1794
18	Saturday; 8 November 1794
19	Sunday; 9 November 1794
20	Monday; 10 November 1794

décade 6
21	Tuesday; 11 November 1794
22	Wednesday; 12 November 1794
23	Thursday; 13 November 1794
24	Friday; 14 November 1794
25	Saturday; 15 November 1794
26	Sunday; 16 November 1794
27	Monday; 17 November 1794
28	Tuesday; 18 November 1794
29	Wednesday; 19 November 1794
30	Thursday; 20 November 1794

Decimal time – 10 h/day
Paris
7h23m59s

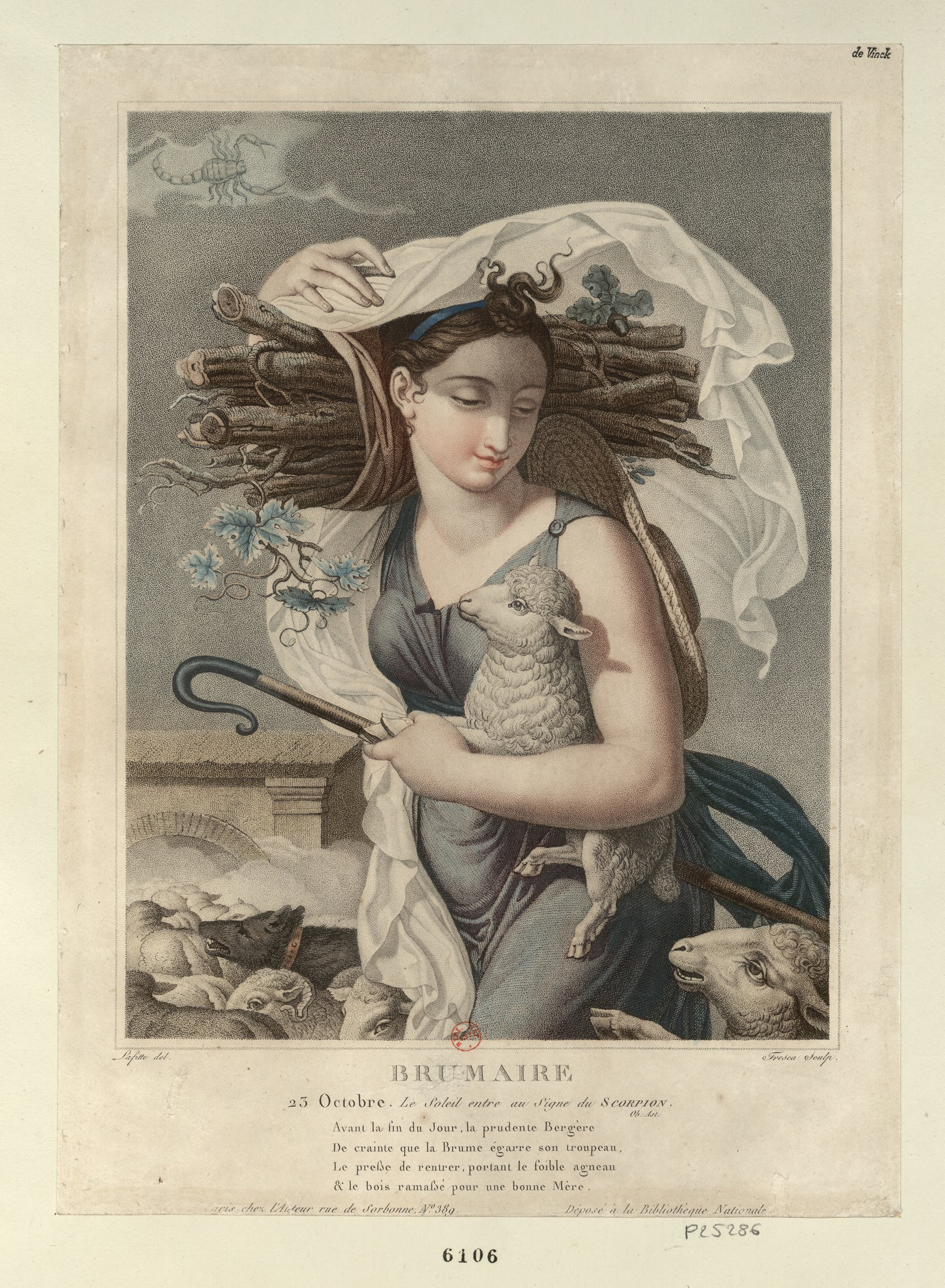
Brumaire

17:12:38
Time of day - 24 h/day
Greenwich

Conversion between Republican and Gregorian calendar for the years I - XIV

Year: 1
Month: Brumaire
Year: I

Weekday:
Primidi
Duodi
Tridi
Quartidi
Quintidi
Sextidi
Septidi
Octidi
Nonidi
Décadi

décade 4
1	Monday; 22 October 1792
2	Tuesday; 23 October 1792
3	Wednesday; 24 October 1792
4	Thursday; 25 October 1792
5	Friday; 26 October 1792
6	Saturday; 27 October 1792
7	Sunday; 28 October 1792
8	Monday; 29 October 1792
9	Tuesday; 30 October 1792
10	Wednesday; 31 October 1792

décade 5
11	Thursday; 1 November 1792
12	Friday; 2 November 1792
13	Saturday; 3 November 1792
14	Sunday; 4 November 1792
15	Monday; 5 November 1792
16	Tuesday; 6 November 1792
17	Wednesday; 7 November 1792
18	Thursday; 8 November 1792
19	Friday; 9 November 1792
20	Saturday; 10 November 1792

décade 6
21	Sunday; 11 November 1792
22	Monday; 12 November 1792
23	Tuesday; 13 November 1792
24	Wednesday; 14 November 1792
25	Thursday; 15 November 1792
26	Friday; 16 November 1792
27	Saturday; 17 November 1792
28	Sunday; 18 November 1792
29	Monday; 19 November 1792
30	Tuesday; 20 November 1792

Decimal time – 10 h/day
Paris
7:17:10

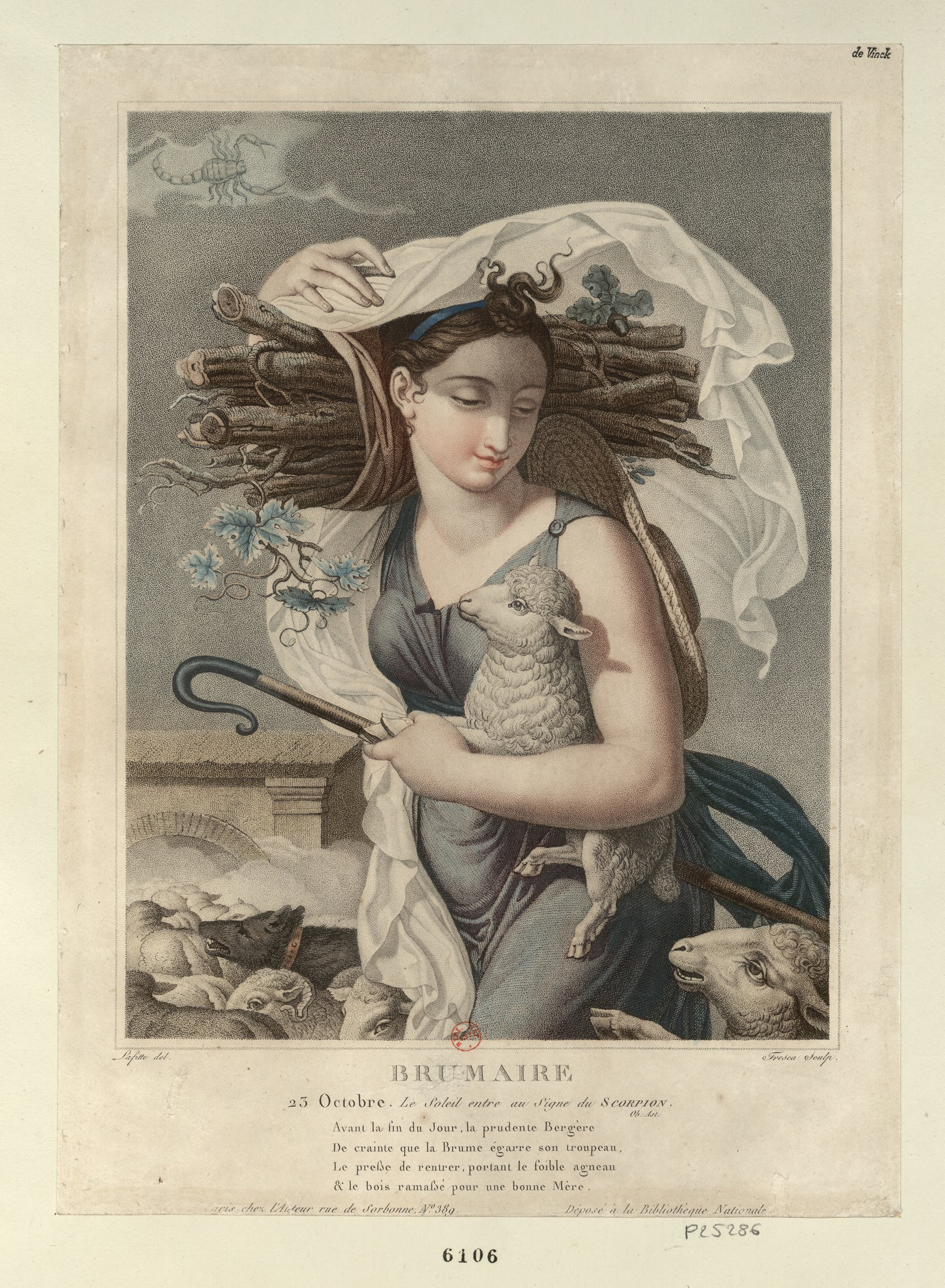
Brumaire

17:12:38
Time of day - 24 h/day
Greenwich

Year: 2
Month: Brumaire
Year: II

Weekday:
Primidi
Duodi
Tridi
Quartidi
Quintidi
Sextidi
Septidi
Octidi
Nonidi
Décadi

décade 4
1	Tuesday; 22 October 1793
2	Wednesday; 23 October 1793
3	Thursday; 24 October 1793
4	Friday; 25 October 1793
5	Saturday; 26 October 1793
6	Sunday; 27 October 1793
7	Monday; 28 October 1793
8	Tuesday; 29 October 1793
9	Wednesday; 30 October 1793
10	Thursday; 31 October 1793

décade 5
11	Friday; 1 November 1793
12	Saturday; 2 November 1793
13	Sunday; 3 November 1793
14	Monday; 4 November 1793
15	Tuesday; 5 November 1793
16	Wednesday; 6 November 1793
17	Thursday; 7 November 1793
18	Friday; 8 November 1793
19	Saturday; 9 November 1793
20	Sunday; 10 November 1793

décade 6
21	Monday; 11 November 1793
22	Tuesday; 12 November 1793
23	Wednesday; 13 November 1793
24	Thursday; 14 November 1793
25	Friday; 15 November 1793
26	Saturday; 16 November 1793
27	Sunday; 17 November 1793
28	Monday; 18 November 1793
29	Tuesday; 19 November 1793
30	Wednesday; 20 November 1793

Decimal time – 10 h/day
Paris
7:17:10

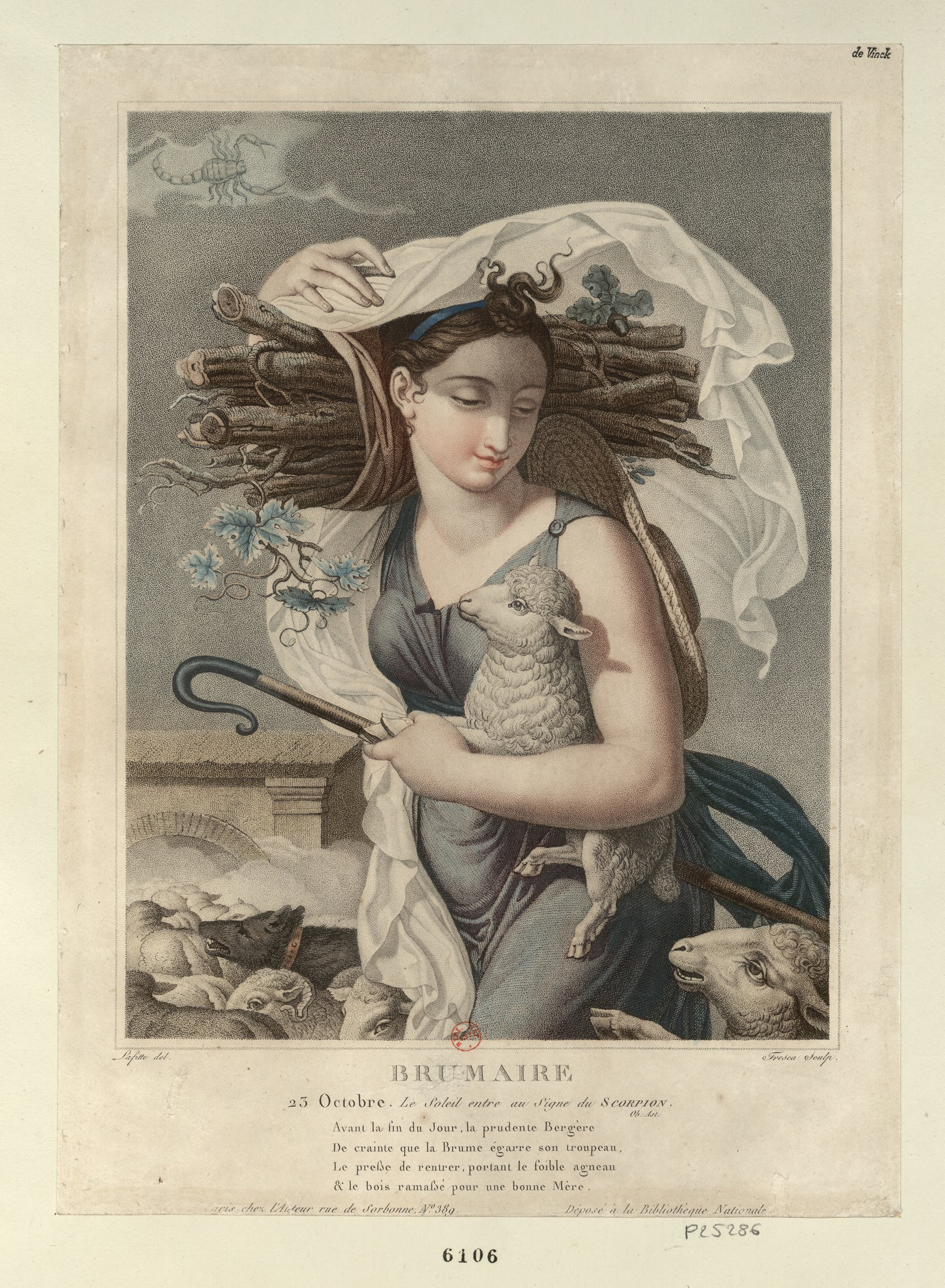
Brumaire

17:12:38
Time of day - 24 h/day
Greenwich

Year: 3
Month: Brumaire
Year: III

Weekday:
Primidi
Duodi
Tridi
Quartidi
Quintidi
Sextidi
Septidi
Octidi
Nonidi
Décadi

décade 4
1	Wednesday; 22 October 1794
2	Thursday; 23 October 1794
3	Friday; 24 October 1794
4	Saturday; 25 October 1794
5	Sunday; 26 October 1794
6	Monday; 27 October 1794
7	Tuesday; 28 October 1794
8	Wednesday; 29 October 1794
9	Thursday; 30 October 1794
10	Friday; 31 October 1794

décade 5
11	Saturday; 1 November 1794
12	Sunday; 2 November 1794
13	Monday; 3 November 1794
14	Tuesday; 4 November 1794
15	Wednesday; 5 November 1794
16	Thursday; 6 November 1794
17	Friday; 7 November 1794
18	Saturday; 8 November 1794
19	Sunday; 9 November 1794
20	Monday; 10 November 1794

décade 6
21	Tuesday; 11 November 1794
22	Wednesday; 12 November 1794
23	Thursday; 13 November 1794
24	Friday; 14 November 1794
25	Saturday; 15 November 1794
26	Sunday; 16 November 1794
27	Monday; 17 November 1794
28	Tuesday; 18 November 1794
29	Wednesday; 19 November 1794
30	Thursday; 20 November 1794

Decimal time – 10 h/day
Paris
7:17:10

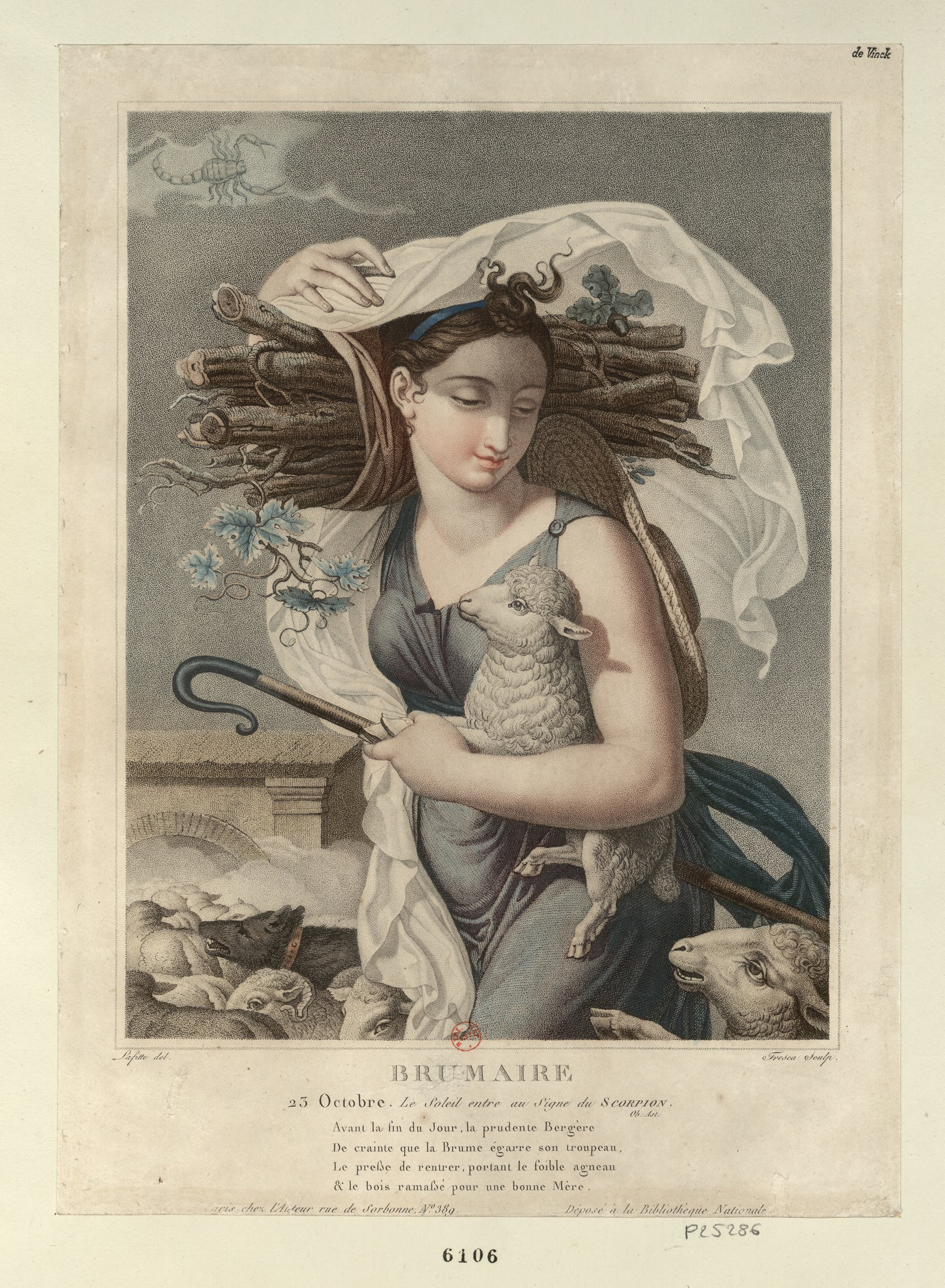
Brumaire

17:12:38
Time of day - 24 h/day
Greenwich

Year: 4
Month: Brumaire
Year: IV

Weekday:
Primidi
Duodi
Tridi
Quartidi
Quintidi
Sextidi
Septidi
Octidi
Nonidi
Décadi

décade 4
1	Friday; 23 October 1795
2	Saturday; 24 October 1795
3	Sunday; 25 October 1795
4	Monday; 26 October 1795
5	Tuesday; 27 October 1795
6	Wednesday; 28 October 1795
7	Thursday; 29 October 1795
8	Friday; 30 October 1795
9	Saturday; 31 October 1795
10	Sunday; 1 November 1795

décade 5
11	Monday; 2 November 1795
12	Tuesday; 3 November 1795
13	Wednesday; 4 November 1795
14	Thursday; 5 November 1795
15	Friday; 6 November 1795
16	Saturday; 7 November 1795
17	Sunday; 8 November 1795
18	Monday; 9 November 1795
19	Tuesday; 10 November 1795
20	Wednesday; 11 November 1795

décade 6
21	Thursday; 12 November 1795
22	Friday; 13 November 1795
23	Saturday; 14 November 1795
24	Sunday; 15 November 1795
25	Monday; 16 November 1795
26	Tuesday; 17 November 1795
27	Wednesday; 18 November 1795
28	Thursday; 19 November 1795
29	Friday; 20 November 1795
30	Saturday; 21 November 1795

Decimal time – 10 h/day
Paris
7:17:10

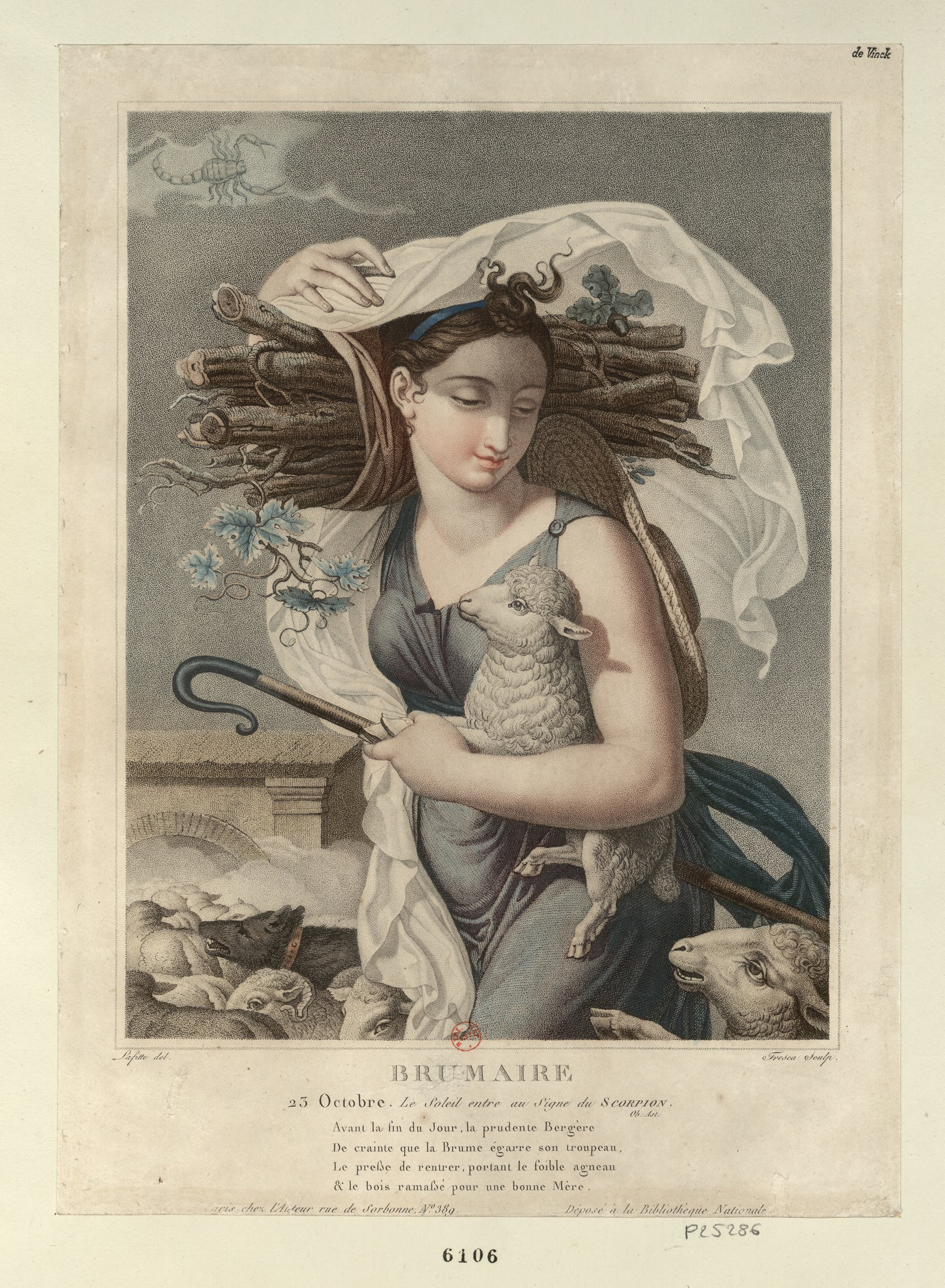
Brumaire

17:12:38
Time of day - 24 h/day
Greenwich

Year: 5
Month: Brumaire
Year: V

Weekday:
Primidi
Duodi
Tridi
Quartidi
Quintidi
Sextidi
Septidi
Octidi
Nonidi
Décadi

décade 4
1	Saturday; 22 October 1796
2	Sunday; 23 October 1796
3	Monday; 24 October 1796
4	Tuesday; 25 October 1796
5	Wednesday; 26 October 1796
6	Thursday; 27 October 1796
7	Friday; 28 October 1796
8	Saturday; 29 October 1796
9	Sunday; 30 October 1796
10	Monday; 31 October 1796

décade 5
11	Tuesday; 1 November 1796
12	Wednesday; 2 November 1796
13	Thursday; 3 November 1796
14	Friday; 4 November 1796
15	Saturday; 5 November 1796
16	Sunday; 6 November 1796
17	Monday; 7 November 1796
18	Tuesday; 8 November 1796
19	Wednesday; 9 November 1796
20	Thursday; 10 November 1796

décade 6
21	Friday; 11 November 1796
22	Saturday; 12 November 1796
23	Sunday; 13 November 1796
24	Monday; 14 November 1796
25	Tuesday; 15 November 1796
26	Wednesday; 16 November 1796
27	Thursday; 17 November 1796
28	Friday; 18 November 1796
29	Saturday; 19 November 1796
30	Sunday; 20 November 1796

Decimal time – 10 h/day
Paris
7:17:10

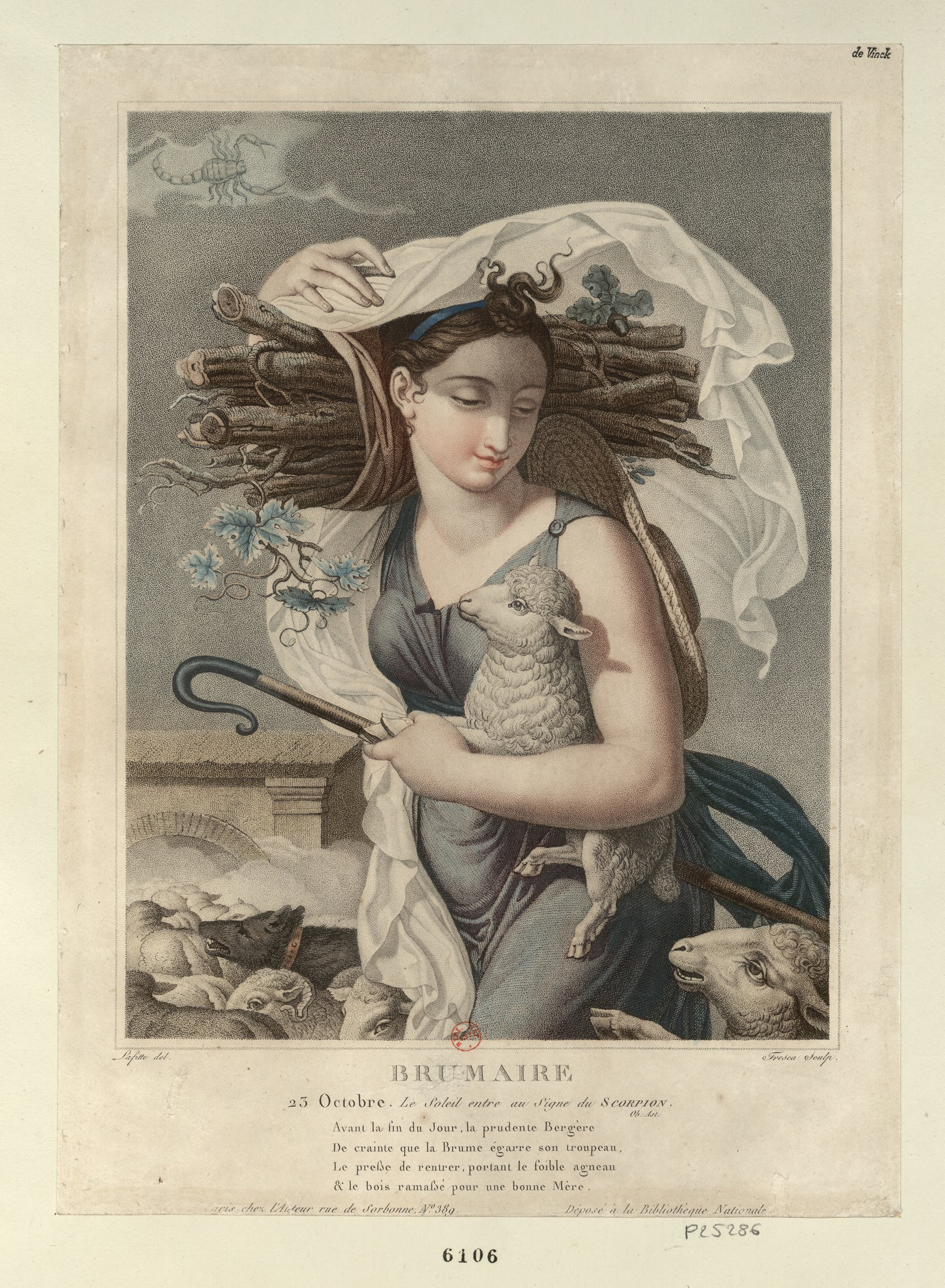
Brumaire

17:12:38
Time of day - 24 h/day
Greenwich

Year: 6
Month: Brumaire
Year: VI

Weekday:
Primidi
Duodi
Tridi
Quartidi
Quintidi
Sextidi
Septidi
Octidi
Nonidi
Décadi

décade 4
1	Sunday; 22 October 1797
2	Monday; 23 October 1797
3	Tuesday; 24 October 1797
4	Wednesday; 25 October 1797
5	Thursday; 26 October 1797
6	Friday; 27 October 1797
7	Saturday; 28 October 1797
8	Sunday; 29 October 1797
9	Monday; 30 October 1797
10	Tuesday; 31 October 1797

décade 5
11	Wednesday; 1 November 1797
12	Thursday; 2 November 1797
13	Friday; 3 November 1797
14	Saturday; 4 November 1797
15	Sunday; 5 November 1797
16	Monday; 6 November 1797
17	Tuesday; 7 November 1797
18	Wednesday; 8 November 1797
19	Thursday; 9 November 1797
20	Friday; 10 November 1797

décade 6
21	Saturday; 11 November 1797
22	Sunday; 12 November 1797
23	Monday; 13 November 1797
24	Tuesday; 14 November 1797
25	Wednesday; 15 November 1797
26	Thursday; 16 November 1797
27	Friday; 17 November 1797
28	Saturday; 18 November 1797
29	Sunday; 19 November 1797
30	Monday; 20 November 1797

Decimal time – 10 h/day
Paris
7:17:10

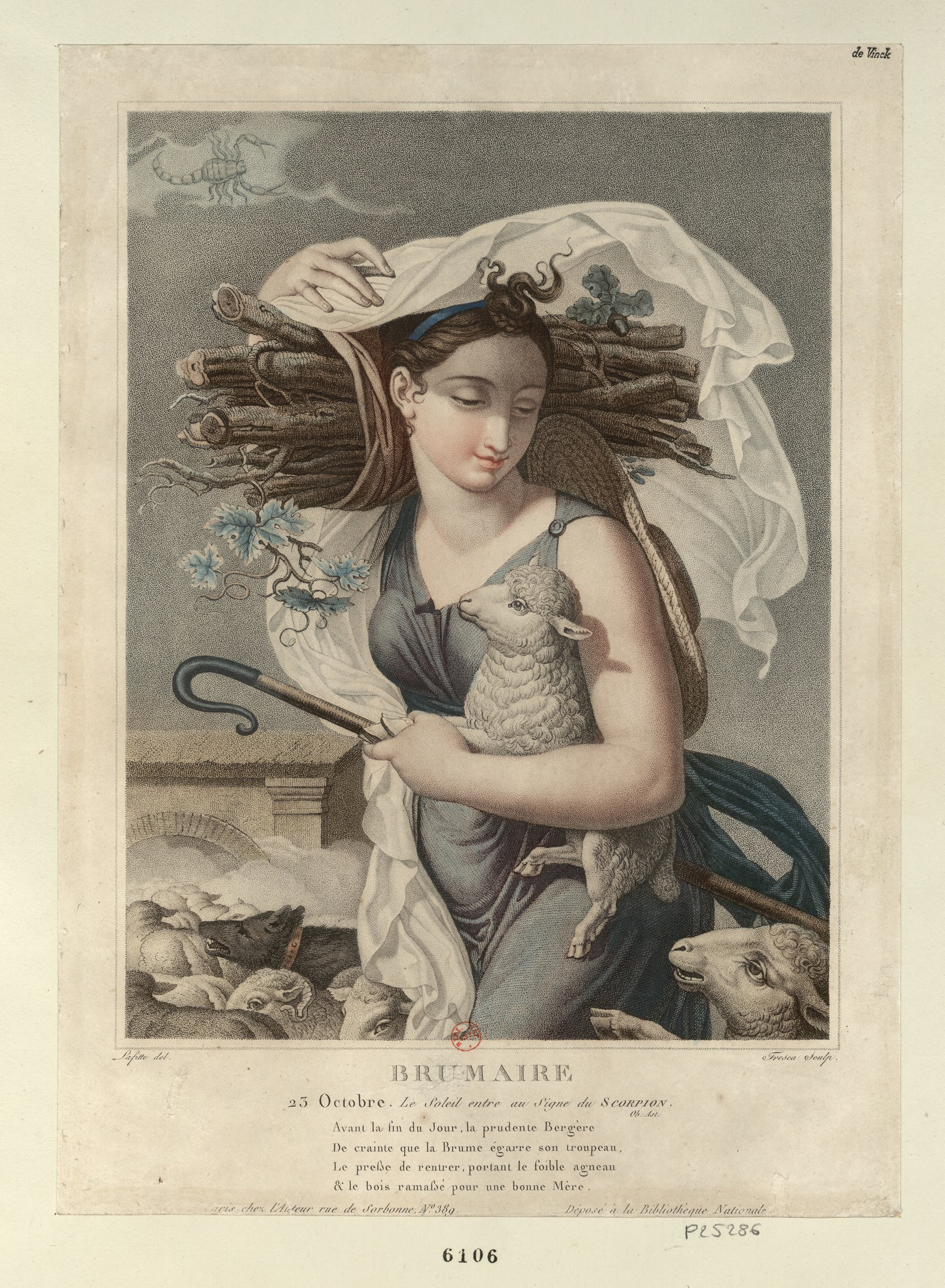
Brumaire

17:12:38
Time of day - 24 h/day
Greenwich

Year: 7
Month: Brumaire
Year: VII

Weekday:
Primidi
Duodi
Tridi
Quartidi
Quintidi
Sextidi
Septidi
Octidi
Nonidi
Décadi

décade 4
1	Monday; 22 October 1798
2	Tuesday; 23 October 1798
3	Wednesday; 24 October 1798
4	Thursday; 25 October 1798
5	Friday; 26 October 1798
6	Saturday; 27 October 1798
7	Sunday; 28 October 1798
8	Monday; 29 October 1798
9	Tuesday; 30 October 1798
10	Wednesday; 31 October 1798

décade 5
11	Thursday; 1 November 1798
12	Friday; 2 November 1798
13	Saturday; 3 November 1798
14	Sunday; 4 November 1798
15	Monday; 5 November 1798
16	Tuesday; 6 November 1798
17	Wednesday; 7 November 1798
18	Thursday; 8 November 1798
19	Friday; 9 November 1798
20	Saturday; 10 November 1798

décade 6
21	Sunday; 11 November 1798
22	Monday; 12 November 1798
23	Tuesday; 13 November 1798
24	Wednesday; 14 November 1798
25	Thursday; 15 November 1798
26	Friday; 16 November 1798
27	Saturday; 17 November 1798
28	Sunday; 18 November 1798
29	Monday; 19 November 1798
30	Tuesday; 20 November 1798

Decimal time – 10 h/day
Paris
7:17:10

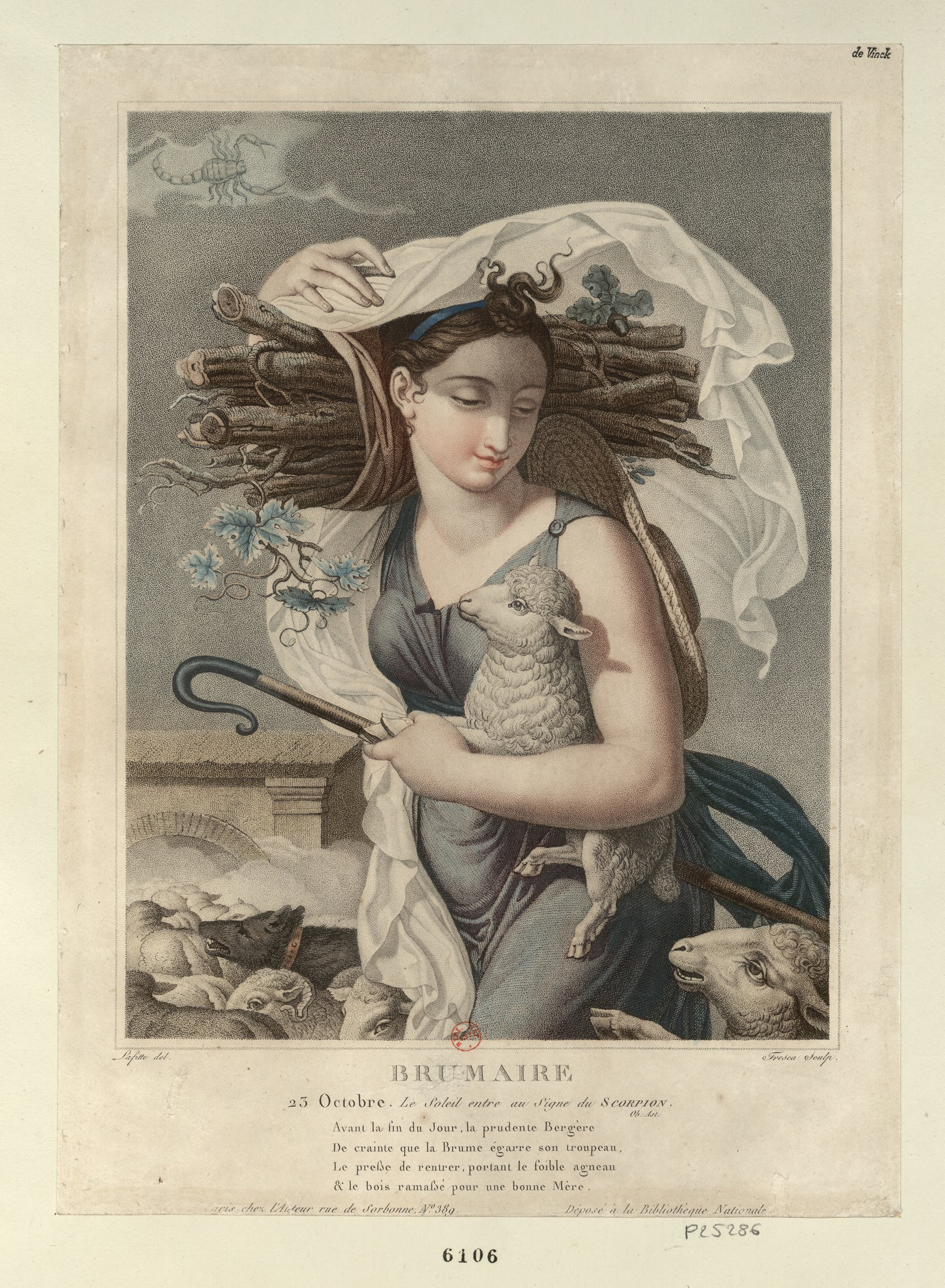
Brumaire

17:12:38
Time of day - 24 h/day
Greenwich

Year: 8
Month: Brumaire
Year: VIII

Weekday:
Primidi
Duodi
Tridi
Quartidi
Quintidi
Sextidi
Septidi
Octidi
Nonidi
Décadi

décade 4
1	Wednesday; 23 October 1799
2	Thursday; 24 October 1799
3	Friday; 25 October 1799
4	Saturday; 26 October 1799
5	Sunday; 27 October 1799
6	Monday; 28 October 1799
7	Tuesday; 29 October 1799
8	Wednesday; 30 October 1799
9	Thursday; 31 October 1799
10	Friday; 1 November 1799

décade 5
11	Saturday; 2 November 1799
12	Sunday; 3 November 1799
13	Monday; 4 November 1799
14	Tuesday; 5 November 1799
15	Wednesday; 6 November 1799
16	Thursday; 7 November 1799
17	Friday; 8 November 1799
18	Saturday; 9 November 1799
19	Sunday; 10 November 1799
20	Monday; 11 November 1799

décade 6
21	Tuesday; 12 November 1799
22	Wednesday; 13 November 1799
23	Thursday; 14 November 1799
24	Friday; 15 November 1799
25	Saturday; 16 November 1799
26	Sunday; 17 November 1799
27	Monday; 18 November 1799
28	Tuesday; 19 November 1799
29	Wednesday; 20 November 1799
30	Thursday; 21 November 1799

Decimal time – 10 h/day
Paris
7:17:10

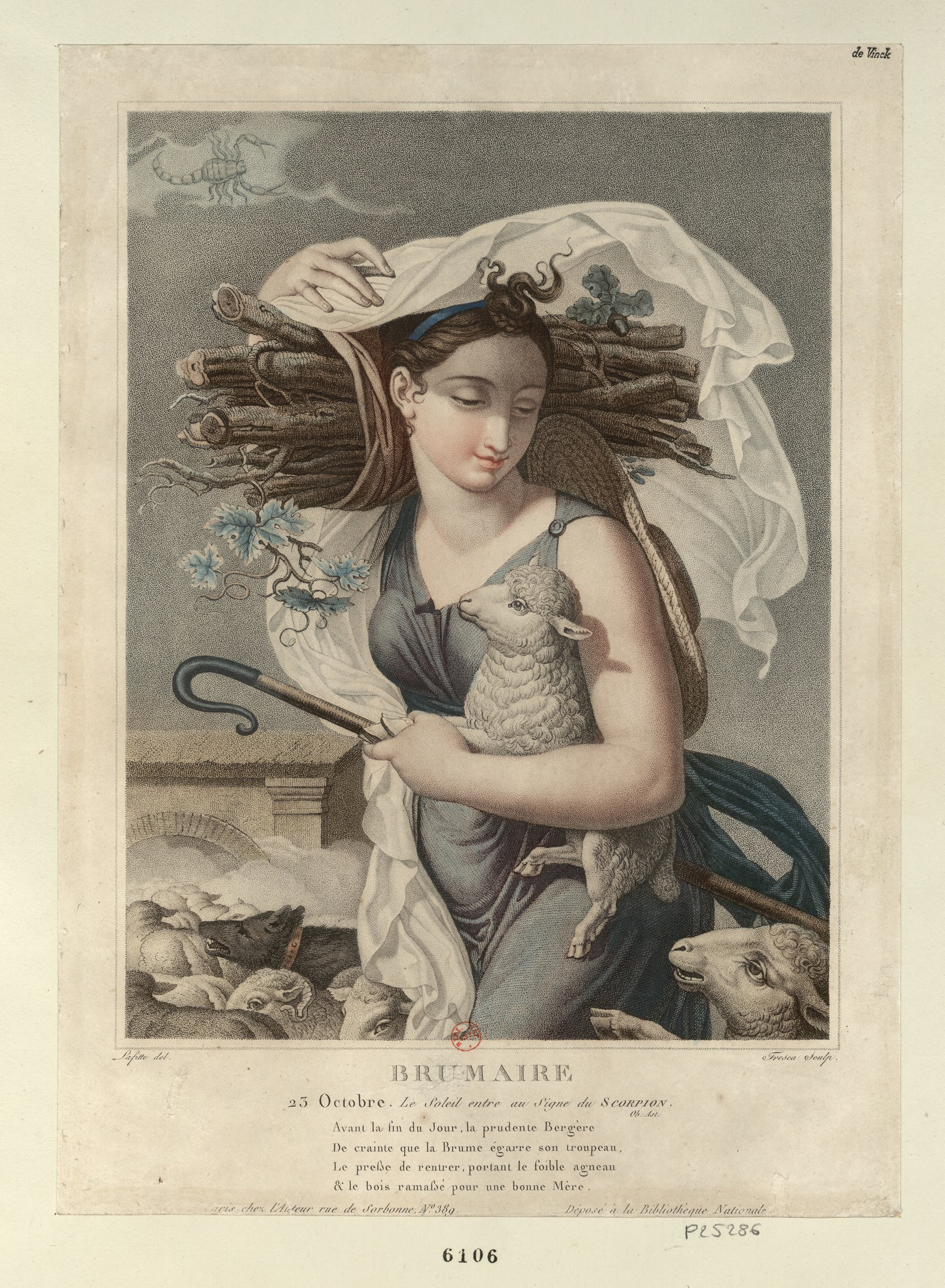
Brumaire

17:12:38
Time of day - 24 h/day
Greenwich

Year: 9
Month: Brumaire
Year: IX

Weekday:
Primidi
Duodi
Tridi
Quartidi
Quintidi
Sextidi
Septidi
Octidi
Nonidi
Décadi

décade 4
1	Thursday; 23 October 1800
2	Friday; 24 October 1800
3	Saturday; 25 October 1800
4	Sunday; 26 October 1800
5	Monday; 27 October 1800
6	Tuesday; 28 October 1800
7	Wednesday; 29 October 1800
8	Thursday; 30 October 1800
9	Friday; 31 October 1800
10	Saturday; 1 November 1800

décade 5
11	Sunday; 2 November 1800
12	Monday; 3 November 1800
13	Tuesday; 4 November 1800
14	Wednesday; 5 November 1800
15	Thursday; 6 November 1800
16	Friday; 7 November 1800
17	Saturday; 8 November 1800
18	Sunday; 9 November 1800
19	Monday; 10 November 1800
20	Tuesday; 11 November 1800

décade 6
21	Wednesday; 12 November 1800
22	Thursday; 13 November 1800
23	Friday; 14 November 1800
24	Saturday; 15 November 1800
25	Sunday; 16 November 1800
26	Monday; 17 November 1800
27	Tuesday; 18 November 1800
28	Wednesday; 19 November 1800
29	Thursday; 20 November 1800
30	Friday; 21 November 1800

Decimal time – 10 h/day
Paris
7:17:10

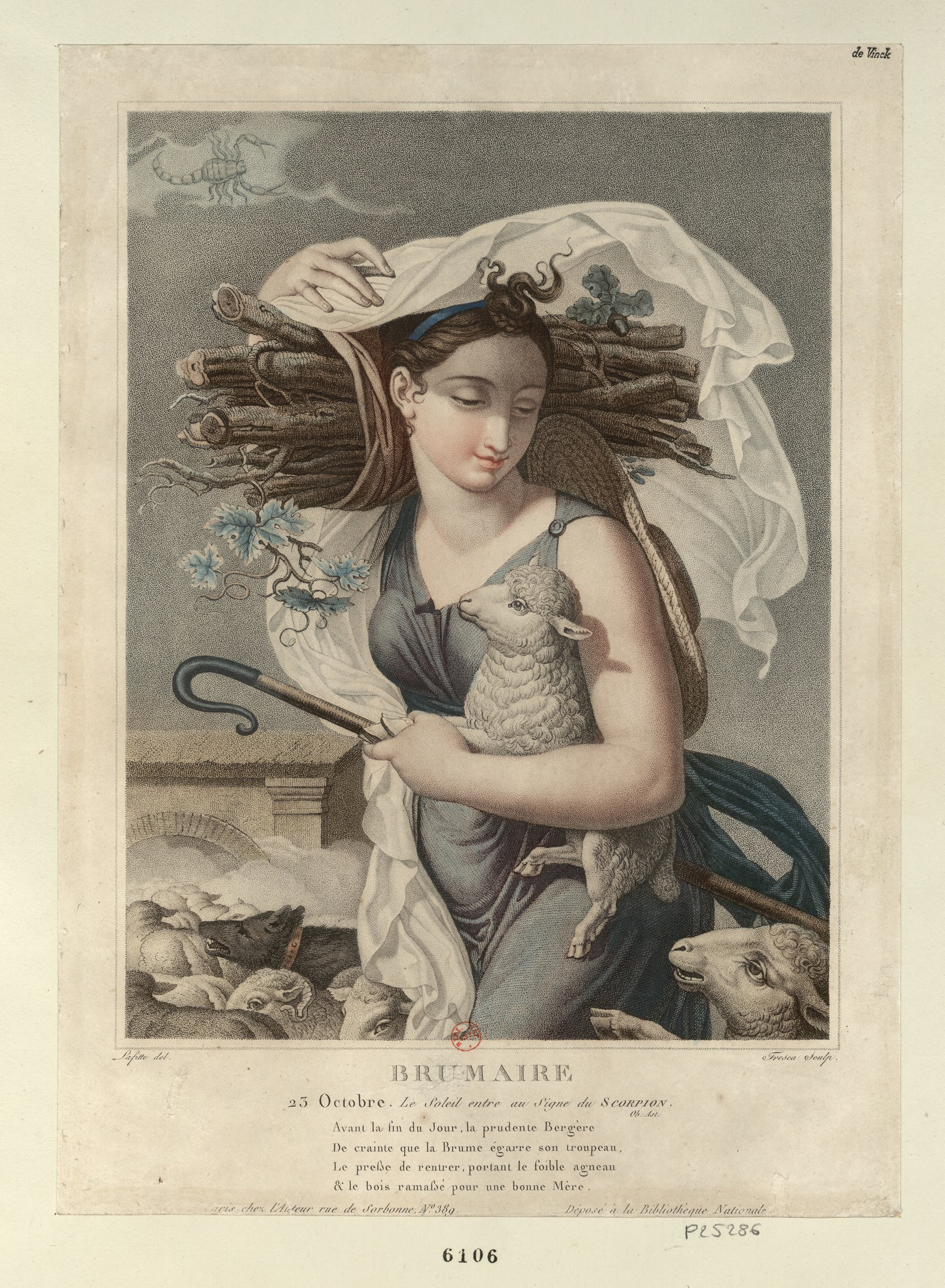
Brumaire

17:12:38
Time of day - 24 h/day
Greenwich

Year: 10
Month: Brumaire
Year: X

Weekday:
Primidi
Duodi
Tridi
Quartidi
Quintidi
Sextidi
Septidi
Octidi
Nonidi
Décadi

décade 4
1	Friday; 23 October 1801
2	Saturday; 24 October 1801
3	Sunday; 25 October 1801
4	Monday; 26 October 1801
5	Tuesday; 27 October 1801
6	Wednesday; 28 October 1801
7	Thursday; 29 October 1801
8	Friday; 30 October 1801
9	Saturday; 31 October 1801
10	Sunday; 1 November 1801

décade 5
11	Monday; 2 November 1801
12	Tuesday; 3 November 1801
13	Wednesday; 4 November 1801
14	Thursday; 5 November 1801
15	Friday; 6 November 1801
16	Saturday; 7 November 1801
17	Sunday; 8 November 1801
18	Monday; 9 November 1801
19	Tuesday; 10 November 1801
20	Wednesday; 11 November 1801

décade 6
21	Thursday; 12 November 1801
22	Friday; 13 November 1801
23	Saturday; 14 November 1801
24	Sunday; 15 November 1801
25	Monday; 16 November 1801
26	Tuesday; 17 November 1801
27	Wednesday; 18 November 1801
28	Thursday; 19 November 1801
29	Friday; 20 November 1801
30	Saturday; 21 November 1801

Decimal time – 10 h/day
Paris
7:17:10

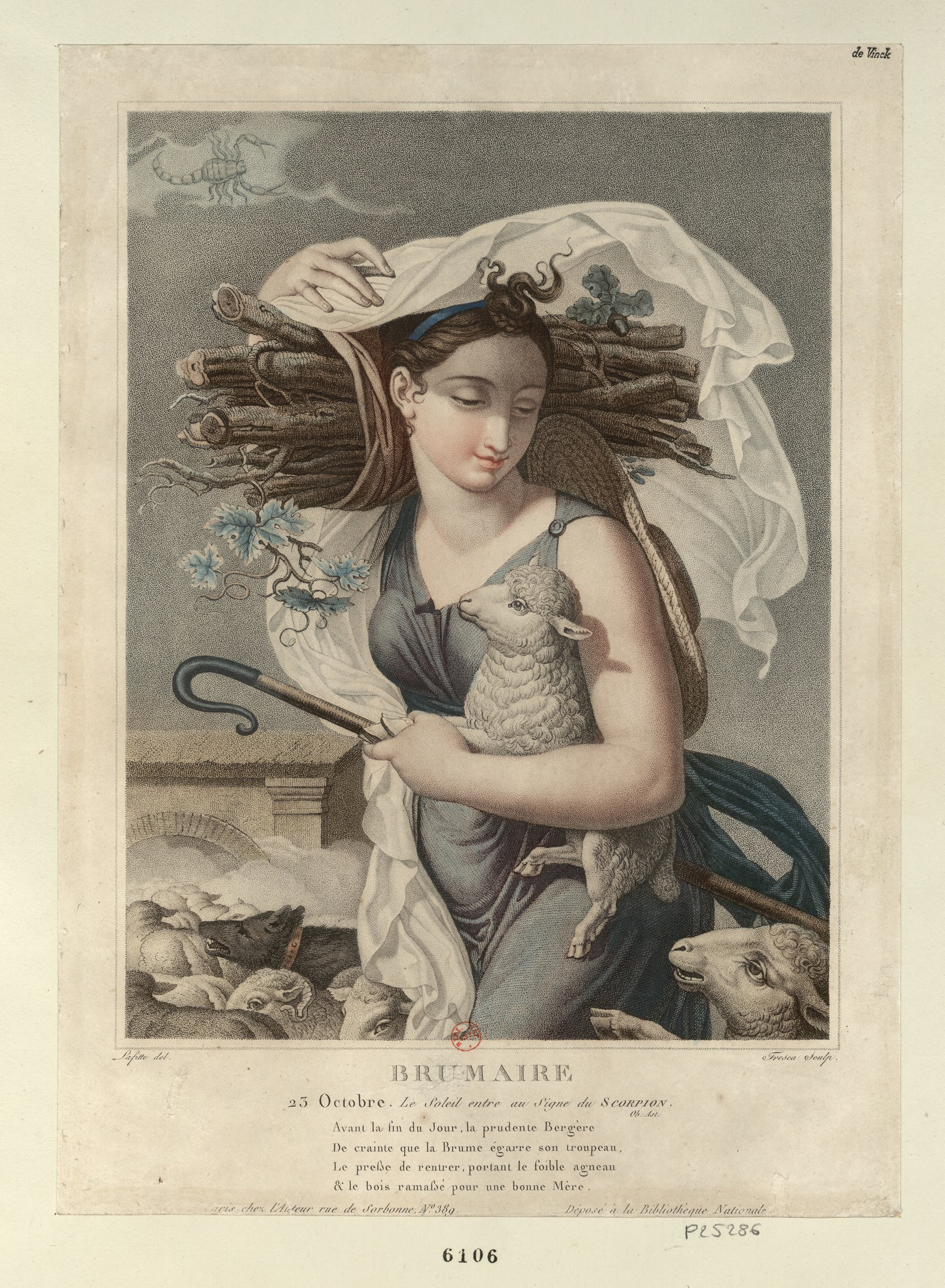
Brumaire

17:12:38
Time of day - 24 h/day
Greenwich

Year: 11
Month: Brumaire
Year: XI

Weekday:
Primidi
Duodi
Tridi
Quartidi
Quintidi
Sextidi
Septidi
Octidi
Nonidi
Décadi

décade 4
1	Saturday; 23 October 1802
2	Sunday; 24 October 1802
3	Monday; 25 October 1802
4	Tuesday; 26 October 1802
5	Wednesday; 27 October 1802
6	Thursday; 28 October 1802
7	Friday; 29 October 1802
8	Saturday; 30 October 1802
9	Sunday; 31 October 1802
10	Monday; 1 November 1802

décade 5
11	Tuesday; 2 November 1802
12	Wednesday; 3 November 1802
13	Thursday; 4 November 1802
14	Friday; 5 November 1802
15	Saturday; 6 November 1802
16	Sunday; 7 November 1802
17	Monday; 8 November 1802
18	Tuesday; 9 November 1802
19	Wednesday; 10 November 1802
20	Thursday; 11 November 1802

décade 6
21	Friday; 12 November 1802
22	Saturday; 13 November 1802
23	Sunday; 14 November 1802
24	Monday; 15 November 1802
25	Tuesday; 16 November 1802
26	Wednesday; 17 November 1802
27	Thursday; 18 November 1802
28	Friday; 19 November 1802
29	Saturday; 20 November 1802
30	Sunday; 21 November 1802

Decimal time – 10 h/day
Paris
7:17:10

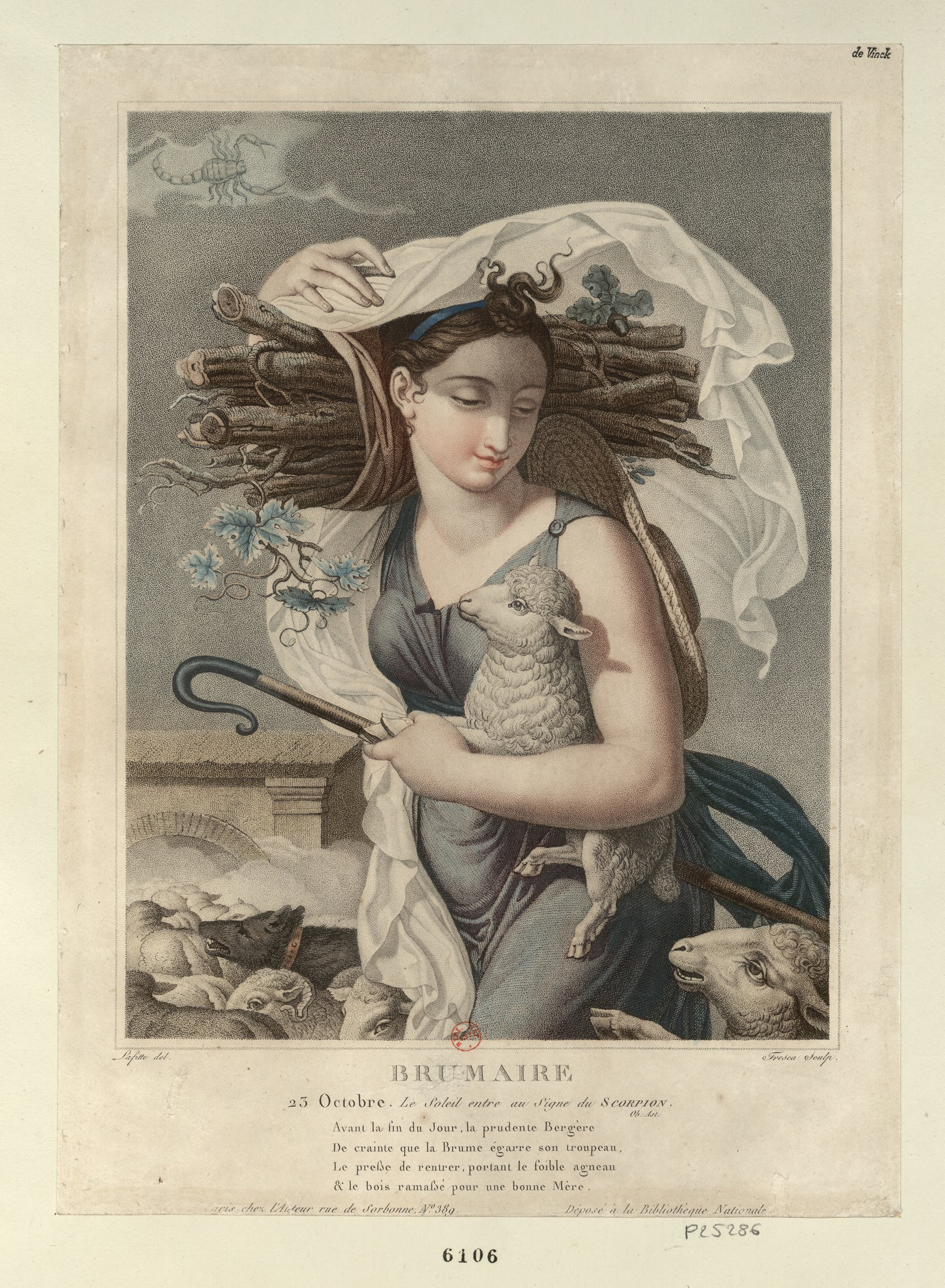
Brumaire

17:12:38
Time of day - 24 h/day
Greenwich

Year: 12
Month: Brumaire
Year: XII

Weekday:
Primidi
Duodi
Tridi
Quartidi
Quintidi
Sextidi
Septidi
Octidi
Nonidi
Décadi

décade 4
1	Monday; 24 October 1803
2	Tuesday; 25 October 1803
3	Wednesday; 26 October 1803
4	Thursday; 27 October 1803
5	Friday; 28 October 1803
6	Saturday; 29 October 1803
7	Sunday; 30 October 1803
8	Monday; 31 October 1803
9	Tuesday; 1 November 1803
10	Wednesday; 2 November 1803

décade 5
11	Thursday; 3 November 1803
12	Friday; 4 November 1803
13	Saturday; 5 November 1803
14	Sunday; 6 November 1803
15	Monday; 7 November 1803
16	Tuesday; 8 November 1803
17	Wednesday; 9 November 1803
18	Thursday; 10 November 1803
19	Friday; 11 November 1803
20	Saturday; 12 November 1803

décade 6
21	Sunday; 13 November 1803
22	Monday; 14 November 1803
23	Tuesday; 15 November 1803
24	Wednesday; 16 November 1803
25	Thursday; 17 November 1803
26	Friday; 18 November 1803
27	Saturday; 19 November 1803
28	Sunday; 20 November 1803
29	Monday; 21 November 1803
30	Tuesday; 22 November 1803

Decimal time – 10 h/day
Paris
7:17:10

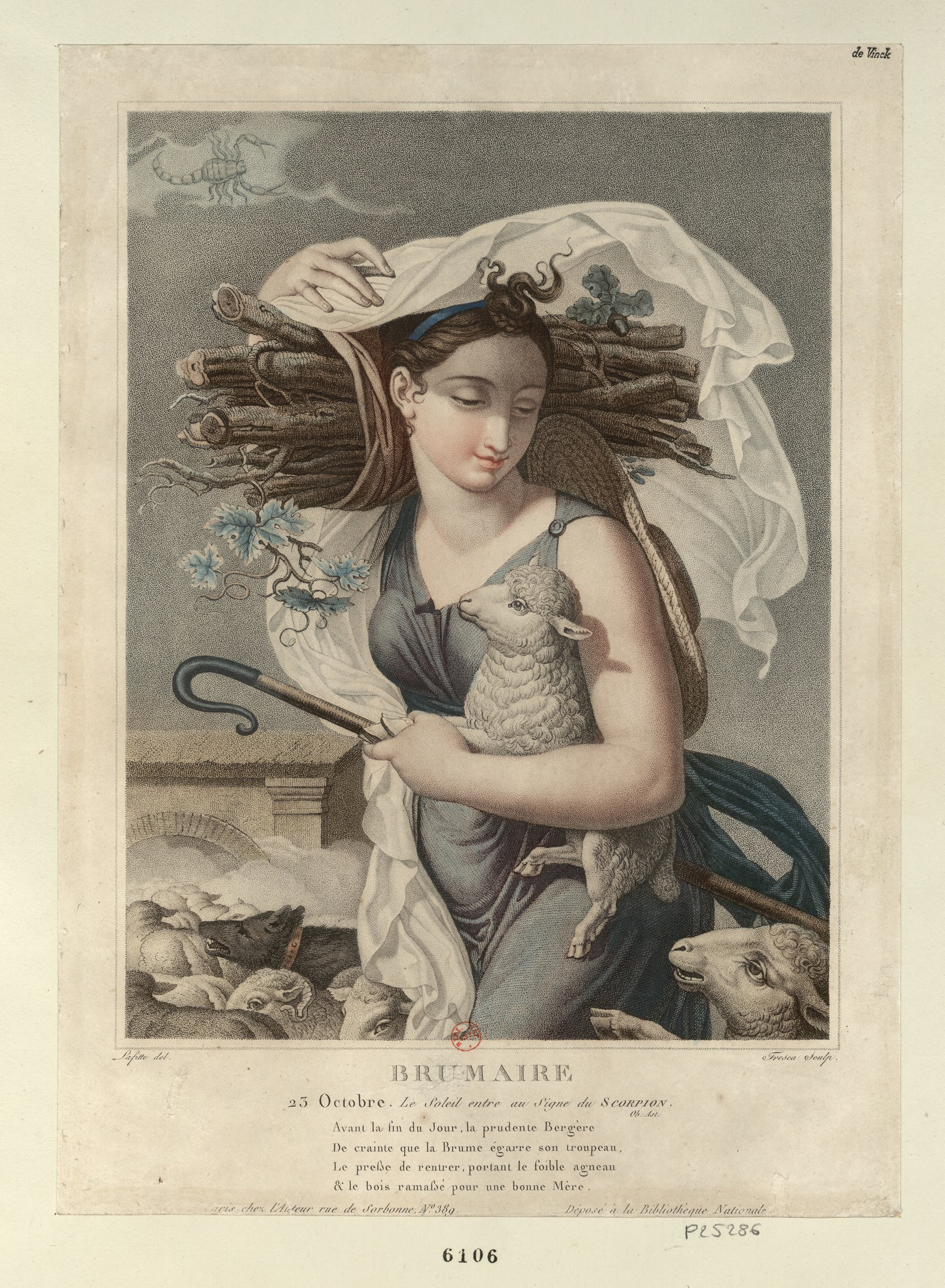
Brumaire

17:12:38
Time of day - 24 h/day
Greenwich

Year: 13
Month: Brumaire
Year: XIII

Weekday:
Primidi
Duodi
Tridi
Quartidi
Quintidi
Sextidi
Septidi
Octidi
Nonidi
Décadi

décade 4
1	Tuesday; 23 October 1804
2	Wednesday; 24 October 1804
3	Thursday; 25 October 1804
4	Friday; 26 October 1804
5	Saturday; 27 October 1804
6	Sunday; 28 October 1804
7	Monday; 29 October 1804
8	Tuesday; 30 October 1804
9	Wednesday; 31 October 1804
10	Thursday; 1 November 1804

décade 5
11	Friday; 2 November 1804
12	Saturday; 3 November 1804
13	Sunday; 4 November 1804
14	Monday; 5 November 1804
15	Tuesday; 6 November 1804
16	Wednesday; 7 November 1804
17	Thursday; 8 November 1804
18	Friday; 9 November 1804
19	Saturday; 10 November 1804
20	Sunday; 11 November 1804

décade 6
21	Monday; 12 November 1804
22	Tuesday; 13 November 1804
23	Wednesday; 14 November 1804
24	Thursday; 15 November 1804
25	Friday; 16 November 1804
26	Saturday; 17 November 1804
27	Sunday; 18 November 1804
28	Monday; 19 November 1804
29	Tuesday; 20 November 1804
30	Wednesday; 21 November 1804

Decimal time – 10 h/day
Paris
7:17:10

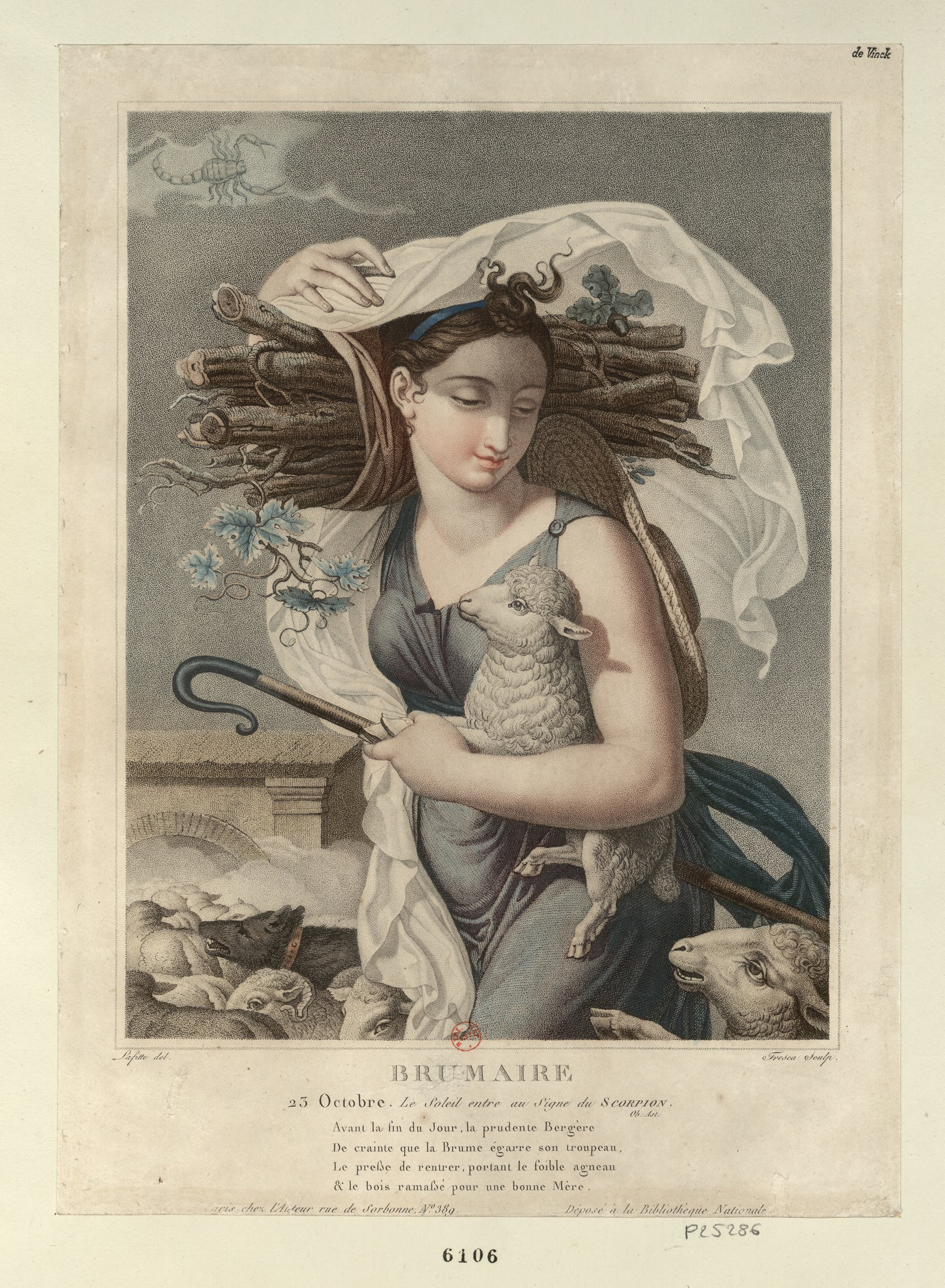
Brumaire

17:12:38
Time of day - 24 h/day
Greenwich

Year: 14
Month: Brumaire
Year: XIV

Weekday:
Primidi
Duodi
Tridi
Quartidi
Quintidi
Sextidi
Septidi
Octidi
Nonidi
Décadi

décade 4
1	Wednesday; 23 October 1805
2	Thursday; 24 October 1805
3	Friday; 25 October 1805
4	Saturday; 26 October 1805
5	Sunday; 27 October 1805
6	Monday; 28 October 1805
7	Tuesday; 29 October 1805
8	Wednesday; 30 October 1805
9	Thursday; 31 October 1805
10	Friday; 1 November 1805

décade 5
11	Saturday; 2 November 1805
12	Sunday; 3 November 1805
13	Monday; 4 November 1805
14	Tuesday; 5 November 1805
15	Wednesday; 6 November 1805
16	Thursday; 7 November 1805
17	Friday; 8 November 1805
18	Saturday; 9 November 1805
19	Sunday; 10 November 1805
20	Monday; 11 November 1805

décade 6
21	Tuesday; 12 November 1805
22	Wednesday; 13 November 1805
23	Thursday; 14 November 1805
24	Friday; 15 November 1805
25	Saturday; 16 November 1805
26	Sunday; 17 November 1805
27	Monday; 18 November 1805
28	Tuesday; 19 November 1805
29	Wednesday; 20 November 1805
30	Thursday; 21 November 1805

Decimal time – 10 h/day
Paris
7:17:10

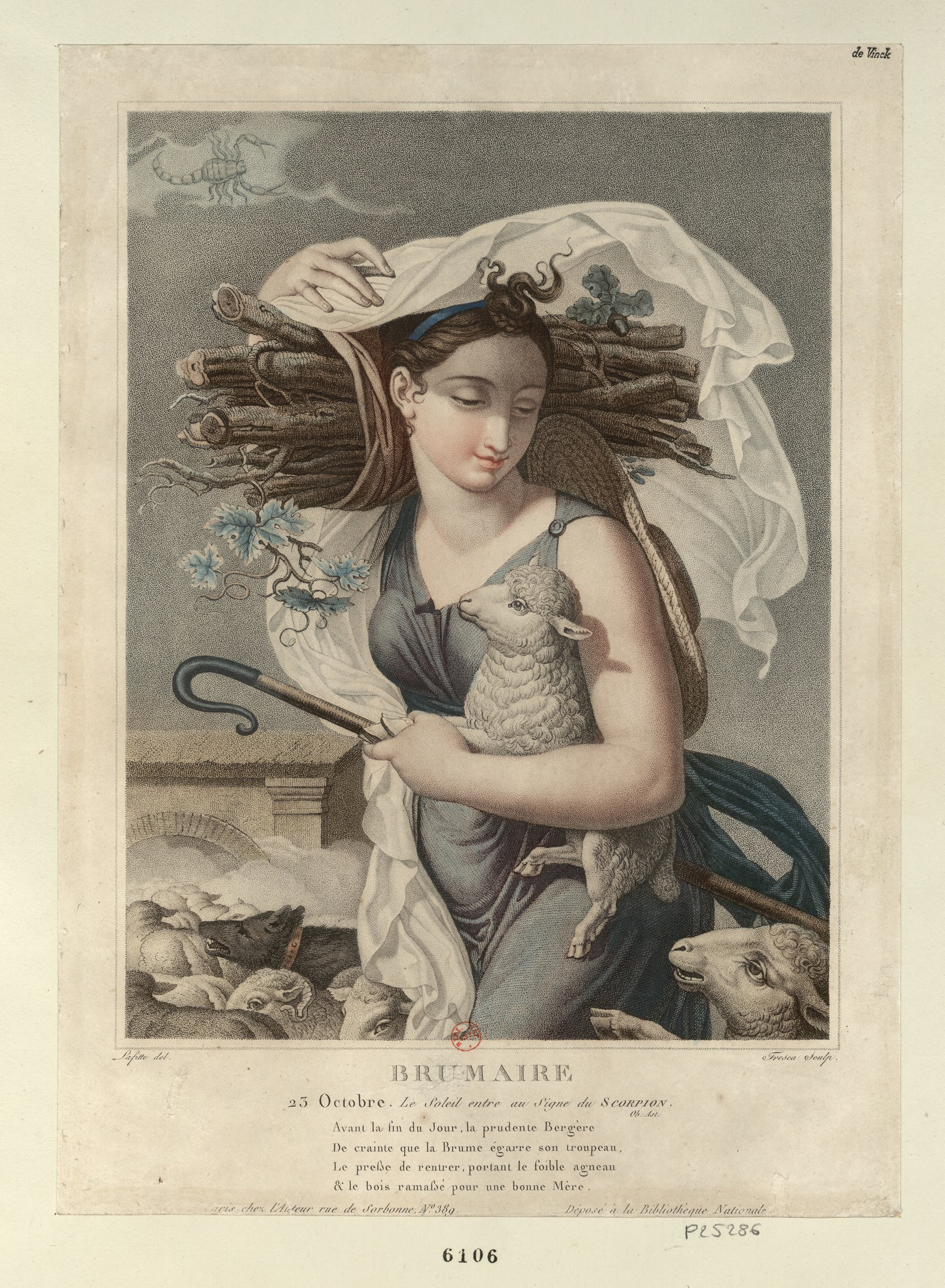
Brumaire

17:12:38
Time of day - 24 h/day
Greenwich

== Day name table ==
Like all FRC months Brumaire lasted 30 days and was divided into three 10-day weeks called décades (decades). Every day had the name of an agricultural plant, except the 5th (Quintidi) and 10th day (Decadi) of every decade, which had the name of a domestic animal (Quintidi) or an agricultural tool (Decadi).

	1^{re} Décade		2^{e} Décade		3^{e} Décade
Primidi	1.	Pomme (Apple)	11.	Salsifis (Salsify)	21.	Bacchante (Wild Ginger)
Duodi	2.	Céleri (Celery)	12.	Macre (Water Chestnut)	22.	Azerole (Crete Hawthorn)
Tridi	3.	Poire (Pear)	13.	Topinambour (Jerusalem Artichoke)	23.	Garence (Madder)
Quartidi	4.	Betterave (Beet Root)	14.	Endive (Endive)	24.	Orange (Orange)
Quintidi	5.	Oye (Goose)	15.	Dindon (Turkey)	25.	Faisan (Pheasant)
Sextidi	6.	Héliotrope (European Turnsole)	16.	Chervi (Skirret)	26.	Pistache (Pistachio)
Septidi	7.	Figue (Fig)	17.	Cresson (Watercress)	27.	Macjonc (Sweetpea)
Octidi	8.	Scorsonère (Black Salsify)	18.	Dentelaire (Leadwort)	28.	Coing (Quince)
Nonidi	9.	Alisier (Chequer Tree)	19.	Grenade (Pomegranate)	29.	Cormier (Service Tree)
Decadi	10.	Charrue (Plough)	20.	Herse (Harrow)	30.	Rouleau (Roller)

== Conversion table ==
Table for conversion between Republican and Gregorian Calendar
for the month "Brumaire"

I / II / III / V / VI / VII
1	2	3	4	5	6	7	8	9	10	11	12	13	14	15	16	17	18	19	20	21	22	23	24	25	26	27	28	29	30
22	23	24	25	26	27	28	29	30	31	1	2	3	4	5	6	7	8	9	10	11	12	13	14	15	16	17	18	19	20
October / 1792 / 1793 / 1794 / 1796 / 1797 / 1798 / November

IV / VIII / IX / X / XI / XIII / XIV
1	2	3	4	5	6	7	8	9	10	11	12	13	14	15	16	17	18	19	20	21	22	23	24	25	26	27	28	29	30
23	24	25	26	27	28	29	30	31	1	2	3	4	5	6	7	8	9	10	11	12	13	14	15	16	17	18	19	20	21
October / 1795 / 1799 / 1800 / 1801 / 1802 / 1804 / 1805 / November

XII
1	2	3	4	5	6	7	8	9	10	11	12	13	14	15	16	17	18	19	20	21	22	23	24	25	26	27	28	29	30
24	25	26	27	28	29	30	31	1	2	3	4	5	6	7	8	9	10	11	12	13	14	15	16	17	18	19	20	21	22
October / 1803 / November
