= Spencer Barrett =

Spencer Barrett may refer to:

- Spencer Barrett (evolutionary biologist) (born 1948), Canadian evolutionary biologist
- W. S. Barrett (1914–2001), English scholar also known as Spencer Barrett
