= Herbert G. Baker =

British-American botanist (1920–2001)

- Born: February 23, 1920; Brighton, England
- Died: July 1, 2001 (aged 81); Oakland, California
- Education: University of London (BSc, PhD)
- Known for: Baker's rule; Founding Member, Organization for Tropical Studies; Founding Member, Association for Tropical Biology and Conservation; 49 Ph.D. Students
- Spouse: Irene Baker (m. 1945; died 1989)
- Awards: Fellow, American Academy of Arts and Sciences; Honorary Fellow, Association for Tropical Biology; Distinguished Fellow, Botanical Society of America; President, Botanical Society of America; President, California Botanical Society; President, Society for the Study of Evolution
- Scientific career
- Fields: Botany; Genetics; Ecology
- Workplaces: University of Leeds; Carnegie Institution of Washington; University College of the Gold Coast; University of California, Berkeley
- Notable students: Mary T. K. Arroyo; Spencer C.H. Barrett; Jane Haskett Bock; Suzanne Koptur

Herbert George Baker (February 23, 1920 – July 2, 2001) was a British-American botanist and evolutionary ecologist who was an authority on pollination biology and breeding systems of angiosperms. He described what became known as "Baker's rule," a theoretical proposal underpinning an empirical observation that the ability to self-fertilize improves colonization ability among plants by increasing the probability of successful establishment after long-distance dispersal. He collaborated with his wife, Irene Baker, studying the content and function of nectar, and undertaking research and publishing papers on its evolutionary and taxonomic significance.

== Early life and education ==
Baker was born on February 23, 1920, in Brighton, England. He received his BSc (1941) and PhD (1945) from the University of London. He married a fellow biologist Irene Baker on April 4, 1945, in Tredegar, Wales. Irene was also Herbert's research partner for the duration of their careers.

== Career ==
From 1940 to 1945 he was a research chemist and assistant plant physiologist at Hosa (Cancer) Research Laboratories, London.

After the war, he was appointed Lecturer from 1945 to 1954 at the University of Leeds. From 1954 to 1957, was Senior Lecturer and Professor at University College of the Gold Coast, Ghana, where he did significant work on bat pollination and began a life-long interest in tropical biology.

In 1948, he spent one year as a visiting researcher at the Carnegie Institute of Washington, closely working with the all-star group of plant biologists, which included Jens Clausen, David Keck, and William Hiesey. Both Bakers then moved to the United States, taking positions at the University of California, Berkeley, where he filled the position that had been recently vacated by Thomas Goodspeed. Baker was the Director of the University of California Botanical Garden from 1957 to 1969, and the Associate Director from 1969 to 1974. He remained at Berkeley for the remainder of his career, where he was Associate Professor, 1957-60, and Professor from 1960. He was a recipient of the Distinguished Teaching Award at Berkeley in 1971, and upon retirement, in 1990, received the Berkeley Citation, awarded to those whose contributions to the University go "beyond the call of duty, and whose achievements exceed the standards of excellence in their fields."

Baker was instrumental in establishing the Organization for Tropical Studies (OTS) and lead one of its early courses in 1968, Reproductive Biology in Tropical Plant Ecology. Based in Costa Rica, OTS has greatly influenced research in tropical botany. Its broader mission is centered on provision of leadership in education, research, and the responsible use of natural resources in the tropics.

The genus Bakerolimon (Plumbaginaceae) was named for Herbert Baker by the Russian botanist Igor Lintchevski in 1968. G. Ledyard Stebbins named "Baker's law" after Baker, for solidifying the scientific consensus around the observation that uniparentally reproducing species capable of self-fertilization (those that are neither dioecious or self-incompatible) possess a greater ability to establish following long-distance dispersal or in similar colonization contexts.

Baker published over 175 research articles and supervised 49 Ph.D. students. He received numerous awards during his long and distinguished career. He was a member of both the American Academy of Arts and Sciences (1984) and the American Philosophical Society (1986).

== Publications ==
- The Genetics of Colonizing Species (1965). Edited with G. Ledyard Stebbins.
- Plants and Civilization (1965)
