= Saharanthus =

Scientific classification
- Kingdom: Plantae
- Clade: Tracheophytes
- Clade: Angiosperms
- Clade: Eudicots
- Order: Caryophyllales
- Family: Plumbaginaceae
- Genus: Saharanthus; M.B.Crespo & Lledó
- Species: S. ifniensis

Binomial name
- Saharanthus ifniensis (Caball.) M.B.Crespo & Lledó

Genus of plants

Saharanthus is a monotypic genus of flowering plants belonging to the family Plumbaginaceae. The only species is Saharanthus ifniensis.

Its native range is Western Sahara.
