= Irene Baker (botanist) =

British born American botanist (1918–1989)

- Born: Irene Williams; 1918
- Died: November 6, 1989 (aged 70–71)
- Citizenship: United Kingdom
- Education: University of Wales
- Known for: Research into pollination biology
- Spouse: Herbert G. Baker
- Scientific career
- Workplaces: Mills College; University of California, Berkeley

Irene Baker (née Williams, 1918 – November 6, 1989) was an American botanist who collaborated with her husband Herbert G. Baker to research pollination biology, the composition of nectar and study its ecological, evolutionary and taxonomic qualities.

== Early life and education ==
Baker was born in the United Kingdom in 1918. She completed a Bachelor of Science degree at the University of Wales in Cardiff where she studied zoology and mathematics. She then taught at both high school and technical college levels.

== Teaching and research ==
In 1945, she married Herbert G. Baker, a botanist and university professor. In 1954 Herbert joined the faculty of the University College of Ghana and Baker accompanied him to Ghana. While in Ghana, Baker researched the tsetse fly. In 1957 Herbert accepted a position with the University of California, Berkeley and again Baker accompanied her husband. She went on to obtain a position teaching microbiology at Mills College, where she worked for the next 11 years.

In 1968 Baker obtained a position at the University of California, Berkeley and began working alongside her husband in the Baker Lab. From 1973, Baker and her husband published numerous papers on nectar and its scientific significance, including, in 1983, a major review of sugars in nectar. Baker undertook much of the analysis that informed their research. She invented novel ambrosiological techniques necessary to obtain the required data. Baker went on to publish methodological papers on some of these techniques and contributed to compendia of practical pollination biology. In undertaking this work, Baker helped open up new areas of research into pollination biology.

== Selected publications ==
- H.G. Baker; Irene Baker (February 1973). "Amino-acids in Nectar and their Evolutionary Significance". Nature. 241 (5391): 543–545. doi:10.1038/241543b0. ISSN 1476-4687. Wikidata Q57318638.
- H. G. Baker; I. Baker (1982). "Starchy and Starchless Pollen in the Onagraceae". Annals of the Missouri Botanical Garden. 69 (4): 748. doi:10.2307/2398994. ISSN 0026-6493. JSTOR 2398994. Wikidata Q56190765.
- I. Baker; H.G. Baker (1979). "Chemical Constituents of the Nectars of Two Erythrina Species and Their Hybrid". Annals of the Missouri Botanical Garden. 66 (3): 446. doi:10.2307/2398837. ISSN 0026-6493. JSTOR 2398837. Wikidata Q56190659.
- Stephen H Bullock; Ricardo Ayala; Irene Baker; Herbert G Baker (1987). "REPRODUCTIVE BIOLOGY OF THE TREE IPOMOEA WOLCOTTIANA (CONVOLVULACEAE)". Madroño. 34 (4): 304–314. ISSN 0024-9637. JSTOR 41424651. Wikidata Q93962248.

== Death ==
Baker died on November 6, 1989.
