= Limoniopsis =

Scientific classification
- Kingdom: Plantae
- Clade: Tracheophytes
- Clade: Angiosperms
- Clade: Eudicots
- Order: Caryophyllales
- Family: Plumbaginaceae
- Genus: Limoniopsis; Lincz.

Genus of plants

Limoniopsis is a genus of flowering plants belonging to the family Plumbaginaceae.

Its native range is Turkey to Caucasus.

Species:

- Limoniopsis davisii Bokhari
- Limoniopsis owerinii (Boiss.) Lincz.
