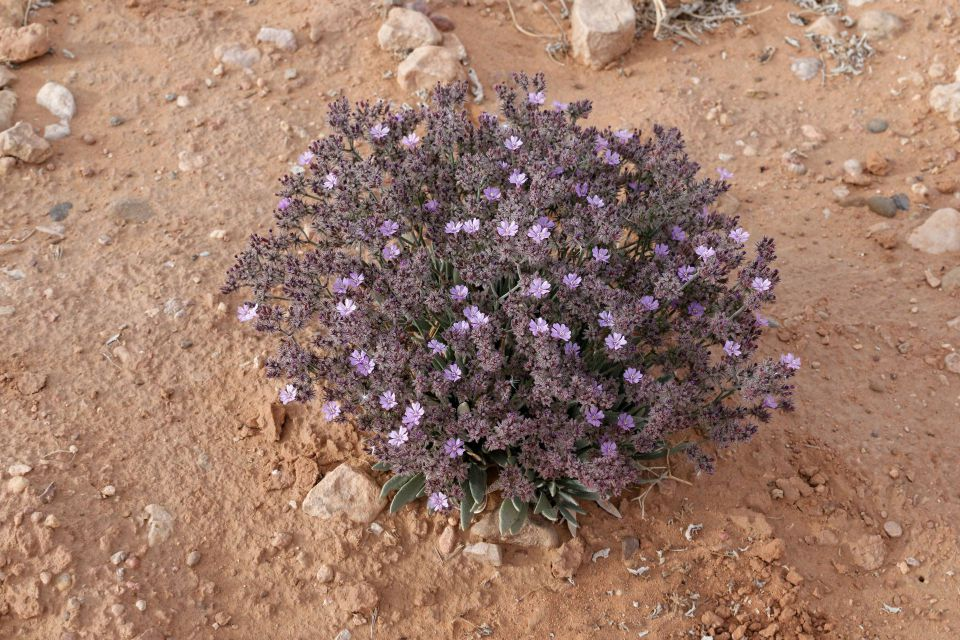
- Ceratolimon feei

Scientific classification
- Kingdom: Plantae
- Clade: Tracheophytes
- Clade: Angiosperms
- Clade: Eudicots
- Order: Caryophyllales
- Family: Plumbaginaceae
- Genus: Ceratolimon; M.B.Crespo & Lledó

= Ceratolimon =

Genus of flowering plants

Ceratolimon is a genus of flowering plants belonging to the family Plumbaginaceae.

Its native range is Northwestern Africa, Southern Yemen, and Somaliland.

Species:

- Ceratolimon feei (Girard) M.B.Crespo & Lledó
- Ceratolimon migiurtinum (Chiov.) M.B.Crespo & Lledó
- Ceratolimon weygandiorum (Maire & Wilczek) M.B.Crespo & Lledó
