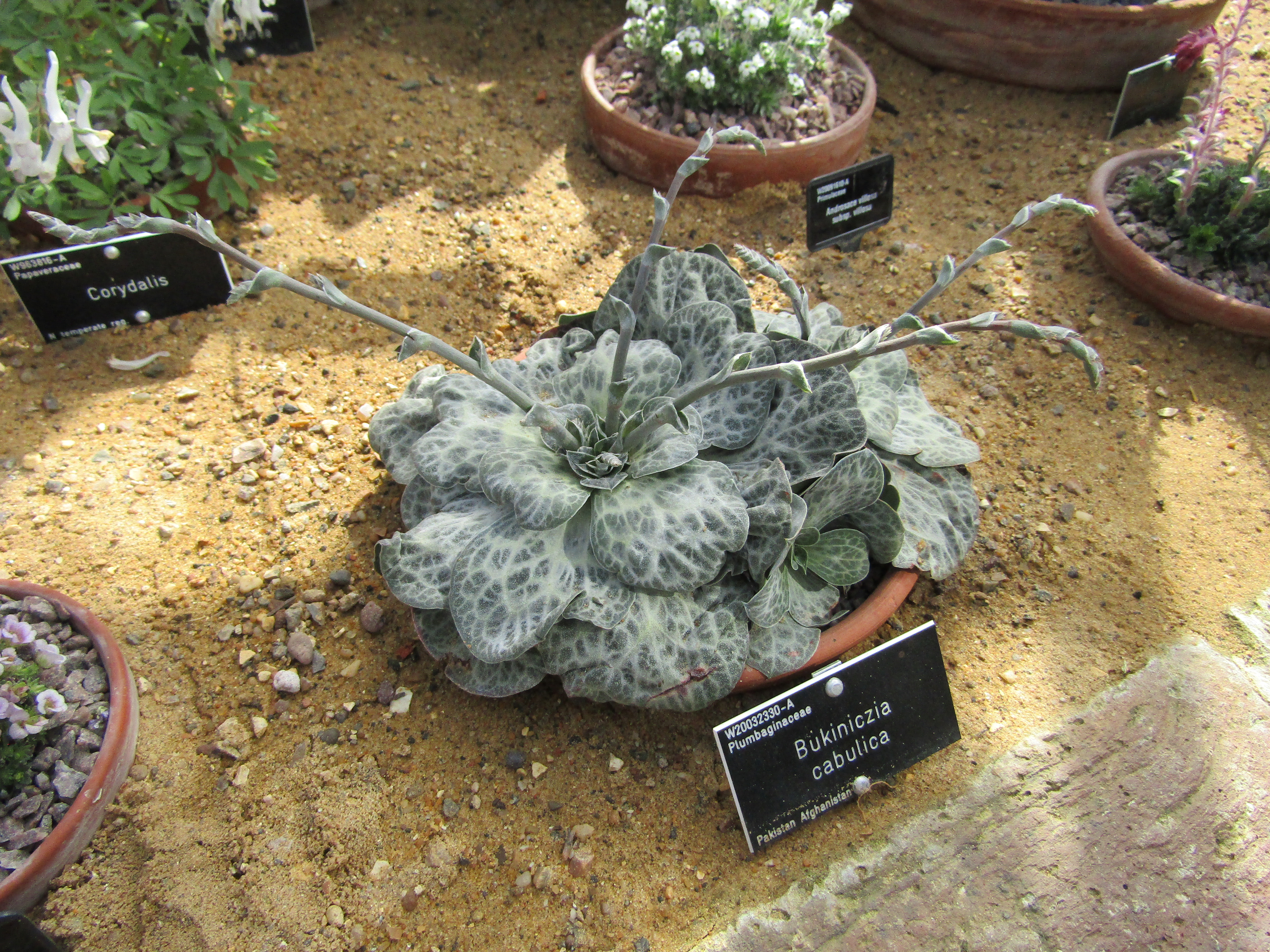

Scientific classification
- Kingdom: Plantae
- Clade: Tracheophytes
- Clade: Angiosperms
- Clade: Eudicots
- Order: Caryophyllales
- Family: Plumbaginaceae
- Genus: Bukiniczia; Lincz.
- Species: B. cabulica

Binomial name
- Bukiniczia cabulica (Boiss.) Lincz.

Synonyms
- Aeoniopsis cabulica (Boiss.) Rech.f. Goniolimon cabulicum (Boiss.) Mobayen; Limonium cabulicum (Boiss.) Kuntze; Statice cabulica Boiss.

= Bukiniczia =

Genus of plant in the leadwort family

Bukiniczia cabulica is a plant in the plumbago or leadwort family, Plumbaginaceae. It is the sole species in the monotypic genus Bukiniczia. It is a biennial native to Afghanistan and Pakistan. It forms a basal rosette of leathery leaves, growing a stem with pink flowers in its second year.
