= Bakerolimon =

Scientific classification
- Kingdom: Plantae
- Clade: Tracheophytes
- Clade: Angiosperms
- Clade: Eudicots
- Order: Caryophyllales
- Family: Plumbaginaceae
- Genus: Bakerolimon (Hook.f.) Lincz.

Genus of plants

Bakerolimon is a genus of flowering plants belonging to the family Plumbaginaceae, named after Herbert G. Baker, British-American Botanist.

Its native range is Peru to North Chile.

Species:

- Bakerolimon peruvianum (Kuntze) Lincz.
- Bakerolimon plumosum (Phil.) Lincz.
