= Proceedings of the Royal Society =

- Language: English

Publication details
- History: 1831– present
- Publisher: Royal Society (United Kingdom)

Standard abbreviations
- ISO 4: Proc. R. Soc.

Indexing
- ISSN: 0370-1662

Links
- Journal homepage; Online archive

Proceedings of the Royal Society is the main research journal of the Royal Society. The journal began in 1831 and was split into two series in 1905:

- Series A: for papers in physical sciences and mathematics.
- Series B: for papers in life sciences.

Many landmark scientific discoveries are published in the Proceedings, making it one of the most important science journals in history. The journal contains several articles written by prominent scientists such as Paul Dirac, Werner Heisenberg, Ernest Rutherford, Erwin Schrödinger, William Lawrence Bragg, Lord Kelvin, J.J. Thomson, James Clerk Maxwell, Dorothy Hodgkin and Stephen Hawking.

In 2004, the Royal Society began The Journal of the Royal Society Interface for papers at the interface of physical sciences and life sciences.

== History ==
The journal began in 1831 as a compilation of abstracts of papers in the Philosophical Transactions of the Royal Society, the older Royal Society publication, that began in 1665.

The journal has changed names several times. Initially it was called Abstracts of the Papers Communicated to the Royal Society of London. In 1854, the name became Proceedings of the Royal Society of London. In 1905, the journal rebranded and was split into

- Proceedings of the Royal Society of London. Series A, Containing Papers of a Mathematical and Physical Character
- Proceedings of the Royal Society of London. Series B, Containing Papers of a Biological Character.

As of 2017, the two series are called

- Proceedings of the Royal Society A: Mathematical, Physical and Engineering Sciences
- Proceedings of the Royal Society B: Biological Sciences.

Proceedings of the Royal Society is now the Royal Society's main research journal, while Philosophical Transactions of the Royal Society publishes articles from invited authors in themed issues.

== Proceedings of the Royal Society A: Mathematical, Physical and Engineering Sciences ==
Proceedings of the Royal Society A: Mathematical, Physical and Engineering Sciences
- Discipline: Natural sciences
- Language: English
- Edited by: Jane Hillston

Publication details
- History: 1905-present
- Publisher: Royal Society (United Kingdom)
- Frequency: Monthly
- Open access: Hybrid
- Impact factor: 2.7 (2025)

Standard abbreviations
- ISO 4: Proc. R. Soc. A

Indexing
- ISSN: 1471-2946
- LCCN: 96660116
- OCLC no.: 610206090

Links
- Journal homepage; Online access; Online archive

Proceedings of the Royal Society A publishes peer-reviewed research articles in the mathematical, physical, and engineering sciences. Since 2022, the Editor-in-Chief is Professor Jane Hillston FRS – the journal's first ever female Editor-in-Chief. According to Journal Citation Reports, as of 2025 the journal has an impact factor of 2.7.

== Proceedings of the Royal Society B: Biological Sciences ==
Proceedings of the Royal Society B: Biological Sciences
- Discipline: Biology
- Language: English
- Edited by: Spencer Barrett

Publication details
- History: 1905-present
- Publisher: Royal Society (United Kingdom)
- Frequency: Biweekly
- Open access: Hybrid
- Impact factor: 3.6 (2025)

Standard abbreviations
- ISO 4: Proc. R. Soc. B

Indexing
- ISSN: 1471-2954
- LCCN: 92656221
- OCLC no.: 1764614

Links
- Journal homepage; Online access; Online archive

Proceedings of the Royal Society B publishes research related to biological sciences. As of 2015 the editor-in-chief is Professor Spencer Barrett. Topics covered in particular include ecology, behavioural ecology and evolutionary biology, as well as epidemiology, human biology, neuroscience, palaeontology, psychology, and biomechanics. The journal publishes predominantly research articles and reviews, as well as comments, replies, and commentaries. In 2005, Biology Letters (originally a supplement to Proceedings B), was launched as an independent journal publishing short articles from across biology. According to Journal Citation Reports, as of 2025 the journal has an impact factor of 3.6.

== Access policy ==
All articles are available free at the journals' websites after one year for Proceedings B and two years for Proceedings A. Eleven years after publication they return to being behind a paywall, then enter the free digital archive seventy years after publication. Authors may have their articles made immediately open access (under Creative Commons license) on payment of an article processing charge. Since January 2023 Proceedings A and Proceedings B are online only.
