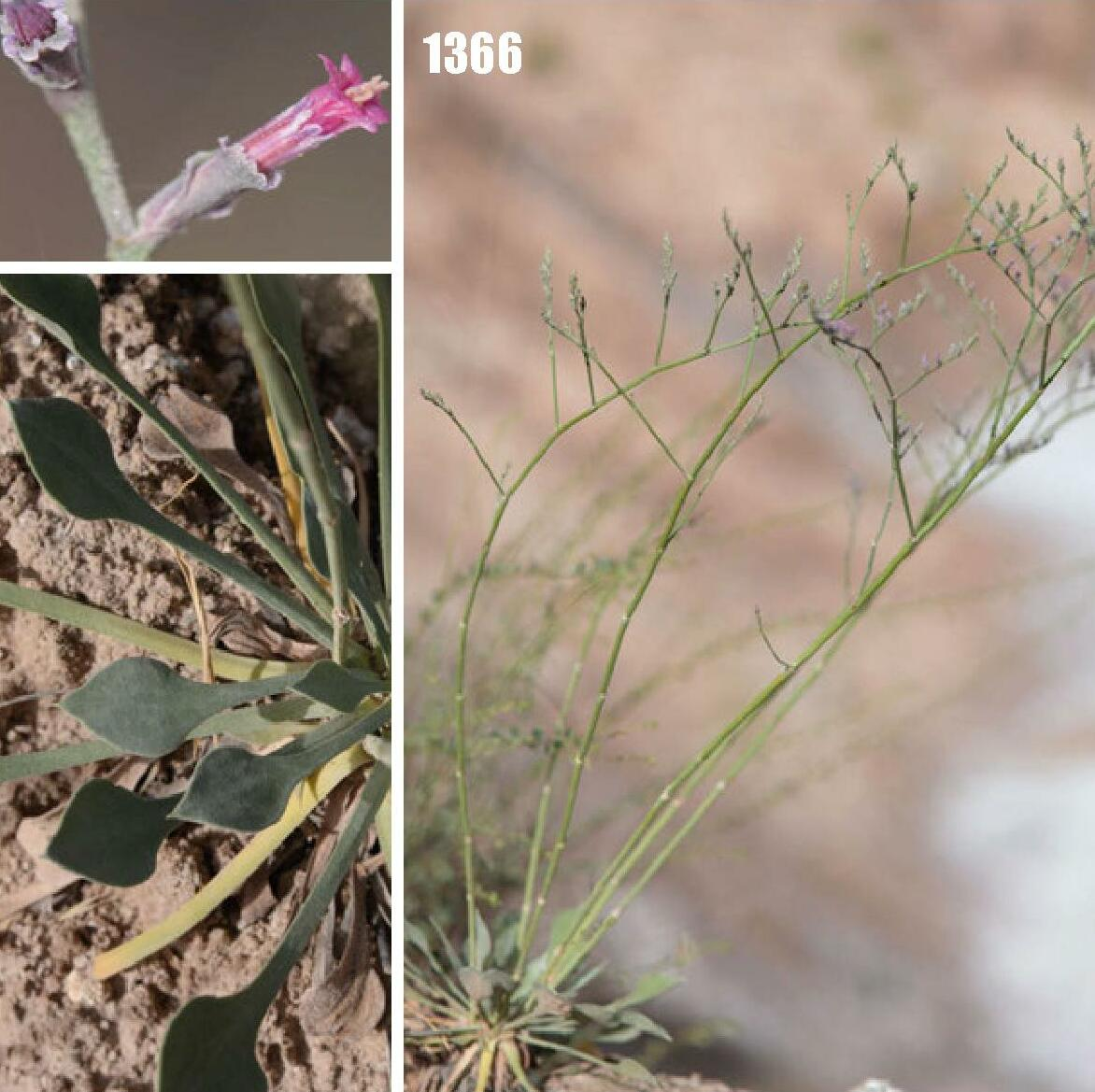
- Cephalorhizum popovii

Scientific classification
- Kingdom: Plantae
- Clade: Tracheophytes
- Clade: Angiosperms
- Clade: Eudicots
- Order: Caryophyllales
- Family: Plumbaginaceae
- Genus: Cephalorhizum; Popov & Korovin

Synonyms
- Popoviolimon Lincz.

= Cephalorhizum =

Genus of flowering plants

Cephalorhizum is a genus of flowering plants belonging to the family Plumbaginaceae.

Its native range is Central Asia and Afghanistan.

Species:

- Cephalorhizum coelicolor (Rech.f.) Rech.f.
- Cephalorhizum micranthum Linchevskii
- Cephalorhizum oopodum Popov & Korovin
- Cephalorhizum popovii Lincz.
- Cephalorhizum turcomanicum Popov
