= Neogontscharovia =

Scientific classification
- Kingdom: Plantae
- Clade: Tracheophytes
- Clade: Angiosperms
- Clade: Eudicots
- Order: Caryophyllales
- Family: Plumbaginaceae
- Genus: Neogontscharovia; Lincz.

Genus of flowering plant

Neogontscharovia is a genus of flowering plants belonging to the family Plumbaginaceae.

It is native to Afghanistan and Tadzhikistan.

The genus name of Neogontscharovia is in honour of Nikolái Goncharov (1900–1942), a Russian botanist and plant collector.

It was first described and published in Bot. Zhurn. (Moscow & Leningrad) Vol.56 on page 1633 in 1971.

== Known species ==
According to Kew:

- Neogontscharovia mira (Lincz.) Lincz.
- Neogontscharovia miranda (Lincz.) Lincz.
- Neogontscharovia saxifragifolia (Rech.f. & Köie) Lincz.
