= Myriolimon =

Scientific classification
- Kingdom: Plantae
- Clade: Tracheophytes
- Clade: Angiosperms
- Clade: Eudicots
- Order: Caryophyllales
- Family: Plumbaginaceae
- Genus: Myriolimon; Lledó, Erben & M.B.Crespo (2005)

Species
- Myriolimon diffusum (Pourr.) Lledó, Erben & M.B.Crespo; Myriolimon ferulaceum (L.) Lledó, Erben & M.B.Crespo

Synonyms
- Myriolepis (Boiss.) Lledó, Erben & M.B.Crespo (2003)

Genus of flowering plants

Myriolimon is a genus of flowering plants in the plumbago family, Plumbaginaceae. It includes two species native to the western and central Mediterranean Basin, including Algeria, Morocco, Portugal, Spain, Sicily, Tunisia, and former Yugoslavia.

- Myriolimon diffusum (Pourr.) Lledó, Erben & M.B.Crespo – France, Portugal, and Spain
- Myriolimon ferulaceum (L.) Lledó, Erben & M.B.Crespo – Algeria, Balearic Islands, France, Morocco, Portugal, Sicily, Spain, Tunisia, and former Yugoslavia
