= Bamiania =

Scientific classification
- Kingdom: Plantae
- Clade: Tracheophytes
- Clade: Angiosperms
- Clade: Eudicots
- Order: Caryophyllales
- Family: Plumbaginaceae
- Genus: Bamiania; Lincz. (1971)
- Species: B. pachycorma

Binomial name
- Bamiania pachycorma (Rech.f.) Lincz. (1971)

Synonyms
- Cephalorhizum pachycormum Rech.f. (1964)

Genus of flowering plants

Bamiania pachycorma is a genus of flowering plant belonging to the family Plumbaginaceae. It is a subshrub endemic to Bamyan Province of central Afghanistan. It is the sole species in genus Bamiania.
