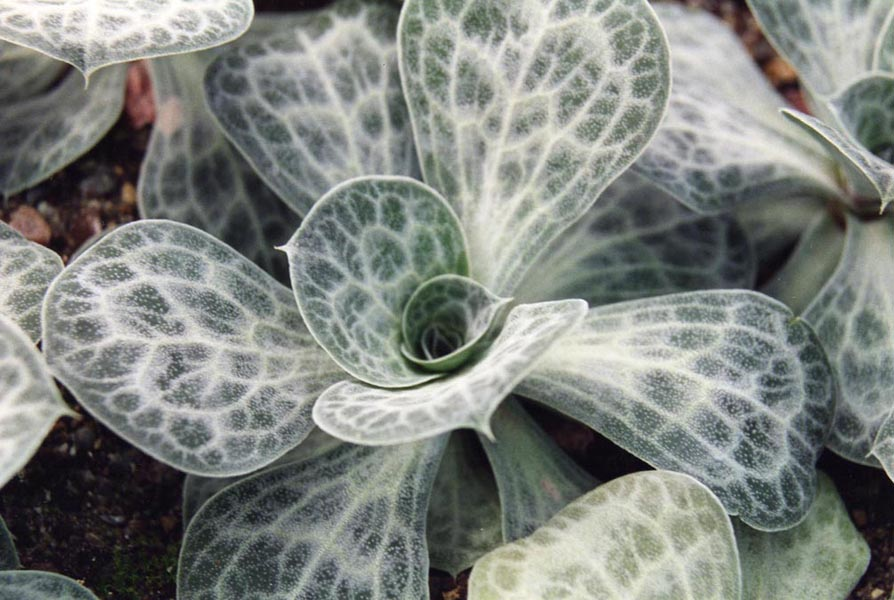
- Dictyolimon macrorrhabdos

Scientific classification
- Kingdom: Plantae
- Clade: Tracheophytes
- Clade: Angiosperms
- Clade: Eudicots
- Order: Caryophyllales
- Family: Plumbaginaceae
- Genus: Dictyolimon; Rech.f.

= Dictyolimon =

Genus of plants

Dictyolimon is a genus of flowering plants belonging to the family Plumbaginaceae.

Its native range is Eastern Afghanistan to Western Pakistan.

Species:

- Dictyolimon gilesii (Hemsl.) Rech.f.
- Dictyolimon griffithii (Aitch. & Hemsl.) Rech.f.
- Dictyolimon macrorrhabdos (Boiss.) Rech.f.
