= Service tree =

Service tree can refer to:

- Cormus domestica, service tree or sorb tree
- Hedlundia pseudofennica, Arran service tree
- Torminalis glaberrima, wild service tree
- Karpatiosorbus latifolia, service tree of Fontainebleau, a species of whitebeam

== See also ==
- Serviceberry, Amelanchier
