= Spencer Barrett (evolutionary biologist) =

Canadian evolutionary biologist

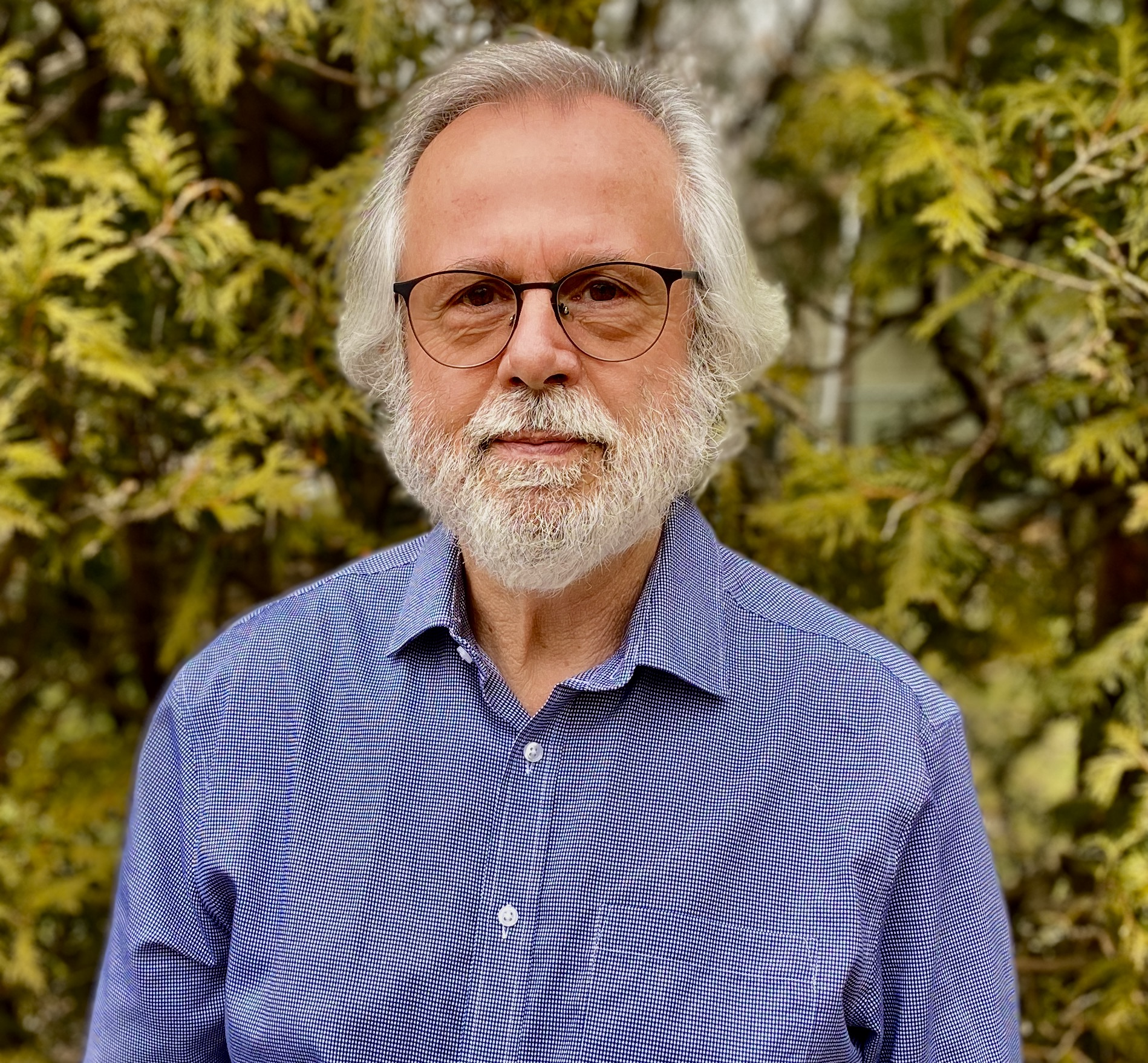
- Barrett in 2020
- Born: Spencer Charles Hilton Barrett; June 7, 1948 (age 78)
- Education: University of Reading (BSc); University of California, Berkeley (PhD)
- Awards: Darwin–Wallace Medal; Flavelle Medal; Lawson Medal; Sewall Wright Award
- Scientific career
- Fields: Evolutionary biology; Evolutionary genetics; Evolutionary ecology; Plant reproduction
- Workplaces: University of Toronto
- Thesis: Breeding systems in Eichhornia and Pontederia, tristylous genera of the Pontederiaceae (1977)
- Doctoral advisor: Herbert G. Baker
- Website: labs.eeb.utoronto.ca/BarrettLab/

Spencer Charles Hilton Barrett FRS FRSC (born June 7, 1948) is a Canadian evolutionary biologist, formerly a Canada Research Chair at University of Toronto and, in 2010, was named Extraordinary Professor at University of Stellenbosch. He is currently University Professor Emeritus at the University of Toronto.

== Education ==
Barrett attended University of Reading in England for his undergraduate education. He then received his graduate degree at the University of California, Berkeley, where he was supervised by Herbert G. Baker and defended his PhD thesis in 1977, focused on the plant breeding systems in Eichhornia and Pontederia species.

== Research and career ==
Barrett's interests are in evolutionary biology, evolutionary genetics, evolutionary ecology and plant reproduction. His research seeks understanding of how flowers evolve and what mechanisms are responsible for mating system transitions in flowering plants. Since 2017, he has served as Editor-in-Chief of the Proceedings of the Royal Society series B, the flagship scientific journal in the biological sciences of the Royal Society.

Barrett is an evolutionary biologist and a worldwide authority on the ecology and genetics of plant reproduction. His work has focused on increasing understanding of how flowers evolve and the mechanisms responsible for mating system transitions in flowering plants.

Barrett provided the first experimental evidence for the purging of deleterious genes following inbreeding in plants. He also demonstrated that self-fertilization owing to large floral displays in plants can have a detrimental effect on the male fertility of plants.

Barrett's research group at the University of Toronto focuses on understanding the mechanisms responsible for the evolution of plant mating strategies, and he has edited several leading books in the field.

== Awards and honours ==
Barrett was elected a Fellow of the Royal Society of Canada in 1998 and a Fellow of the Royal Society of London in 2004. He is a founding member of the Canadian Society for Ecology and Evolution and its President from 2010 to 2011.

In 2006 the Canadian Botanical Association awarded him the George Lawson Medal for lifetime achievement in botany. In 2008 he received the Sewall Wright Award from the American Society of Naturalists. In 2014, he received the Flavelle Medal from the Royal Society of Canada. In 2020 the Linnean Society of London award him the Darwin–Wallace Medal.

In 2009 he was elected as a Foreign Honorary Member of the American Academy of Arts and Sciences. In April 2020 Spencer Barrett was elected an International Member (Foreign Associate) of the National Academy of Sciences.
