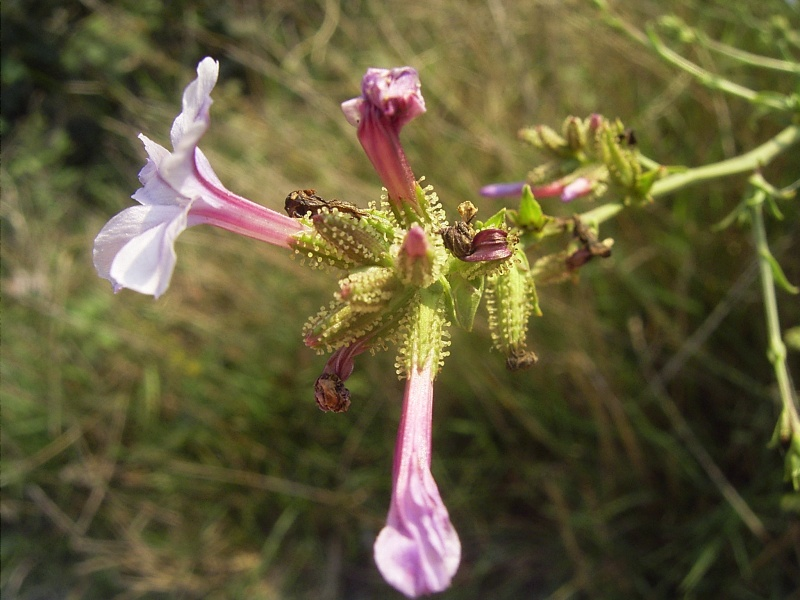
- Plumbago europaea

Scientific classification
- Kingdom: Plantae
- Clade: Tracheophytes
- Clade: Angiosperms
- Clade: Eudicots
- Order: Caryophyllales
- Family: Plumbaginaceae; Juss. (1789), nom. cons.

Genera
- 20; see text

= Plumbaginaceae =

Family of flowering plants

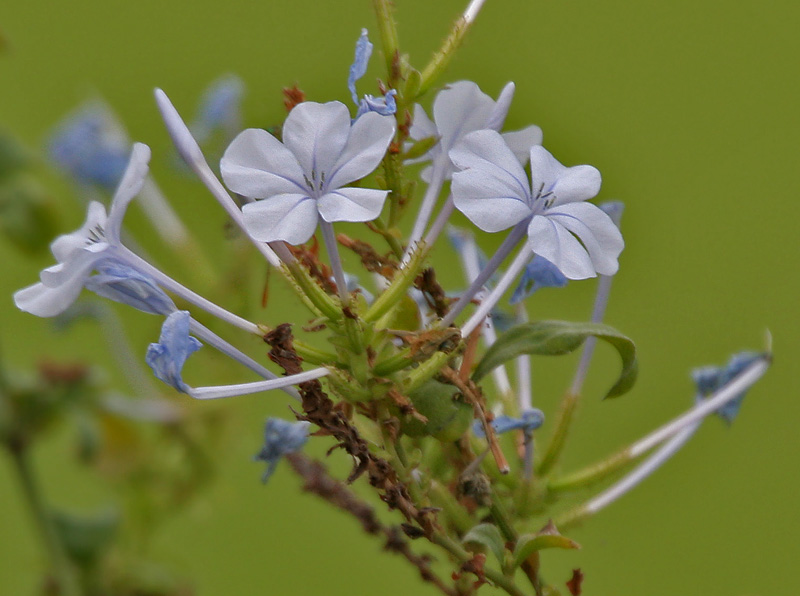
Plumbago auriculata, the Cape leadwort

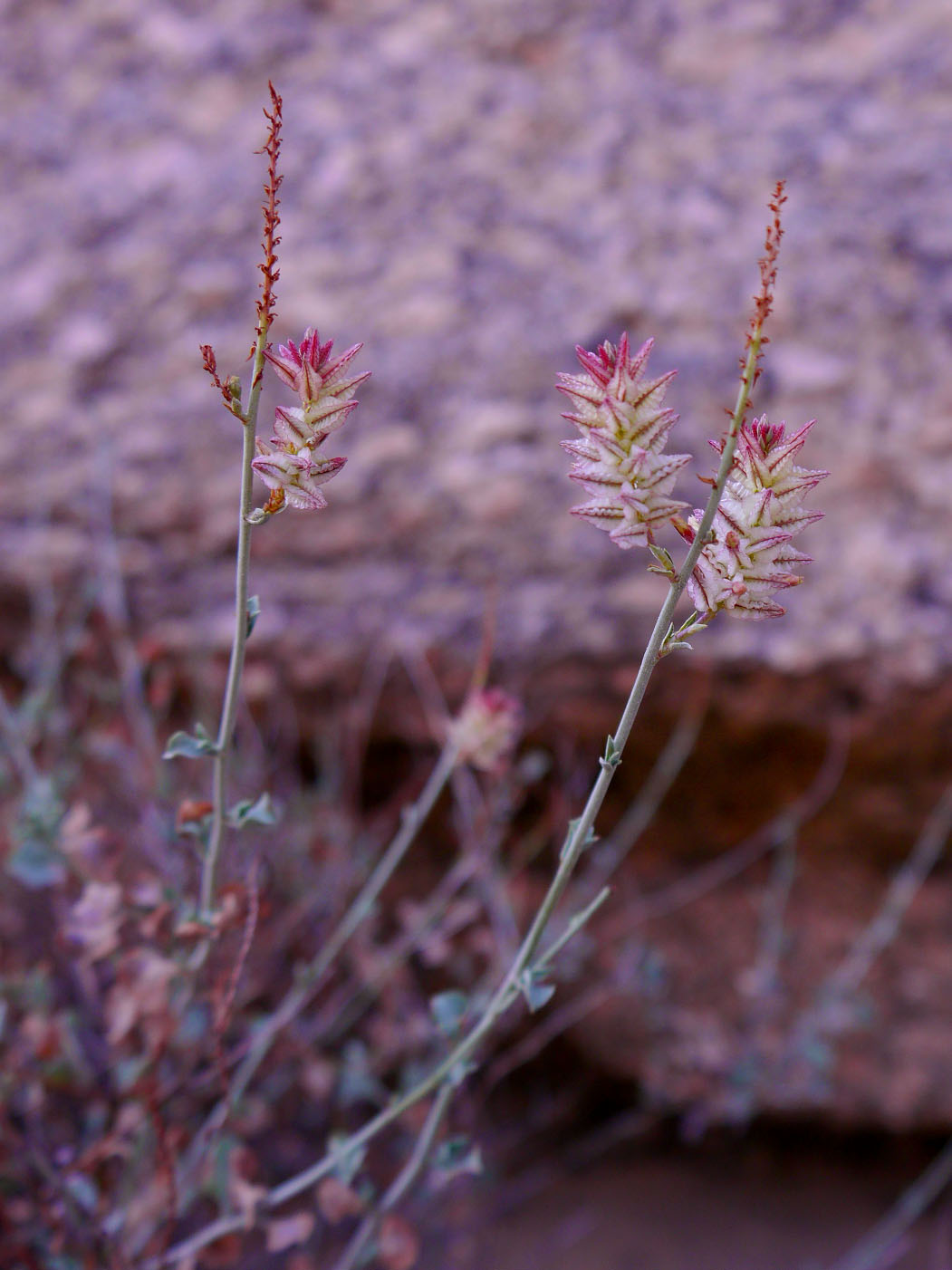
Plumbago africana in Vogelfederberg, Namibia

Plumbaginaceae is a family of flowering plants, with a cosmopolitan distribution. The family is sometimes referred to as the leadwort family or the plumbago family.

Most species in this family are perennial herbaceous plants, but a few grow as lianas or shrubs. The plants have perfect flowers and are pollinated by insects. They are found in many different climatic regions, from arctic to tropical conditions, but are particularly associated with salt-rich steppes, marshes, and sea coasts.

The family has been recognized by most taxonomists. The APG II system (2003; unchanged from the APG system of 1998), recognizes this family and assigns it to the order Caryophyllales in the clade core eudicots. It includes c. 30 genera and about 725 species.

The 1981 Cronquist system placed the family in a separate order Plumbaginales, which included no other families. The Dahlgren system had segregated some of these plants as family Limoniaceae.

== Genera ==
20 genera are accepted.

- Acantholimon Boiss.
- Aegialitis R.Br.
- Armeria (DC.) Willd., the thrifts or seapinks
- Bakerolimon (Hook.f.) Lincz.
- Bamiania Lincz.
- Bukiniczia Lincz.
- Cephalorhizum Popov & Korovin
- Ceratolimon M.B.Crespo & Lledó
- Ceratostigma Bunge, the leadworts
- Dictyolimon Rech.f.
- Goniolimon Boiss.
- Limoniastrum Heist. ex Fabr.
- Limoniopsis Lincz.
- Limonium Mill. (syn. Statice), the sealavenders
- Muellerolimon Lincz.
- Myriolimon Lledó, Erben & M.B.Crespo
- Neogontscharovia Lincz.
- Plumbago Tourn. ex L., the leadworts or plumbagos
- Psylliostachys (Jaub. & Spach) Nevski
- Saharanthus M.B.Crespo & Lledó

== Cultivation and uses ==
Chalk glands are found in this family. The family includes a number of popular garden species, which are grown for their attractive flowers.
