= Leadwort =

Leadwort is a common name for various flowering plants in the family Plumbaginaceae, in particular those in the genera:

- Ceratostigma
- Plumbago

It can also refer to metallophyte plants capable of tolerating high levels of lead, such as spring sandwort Minuartia verna or alpine pennycress Thlaspi caerulescens.
