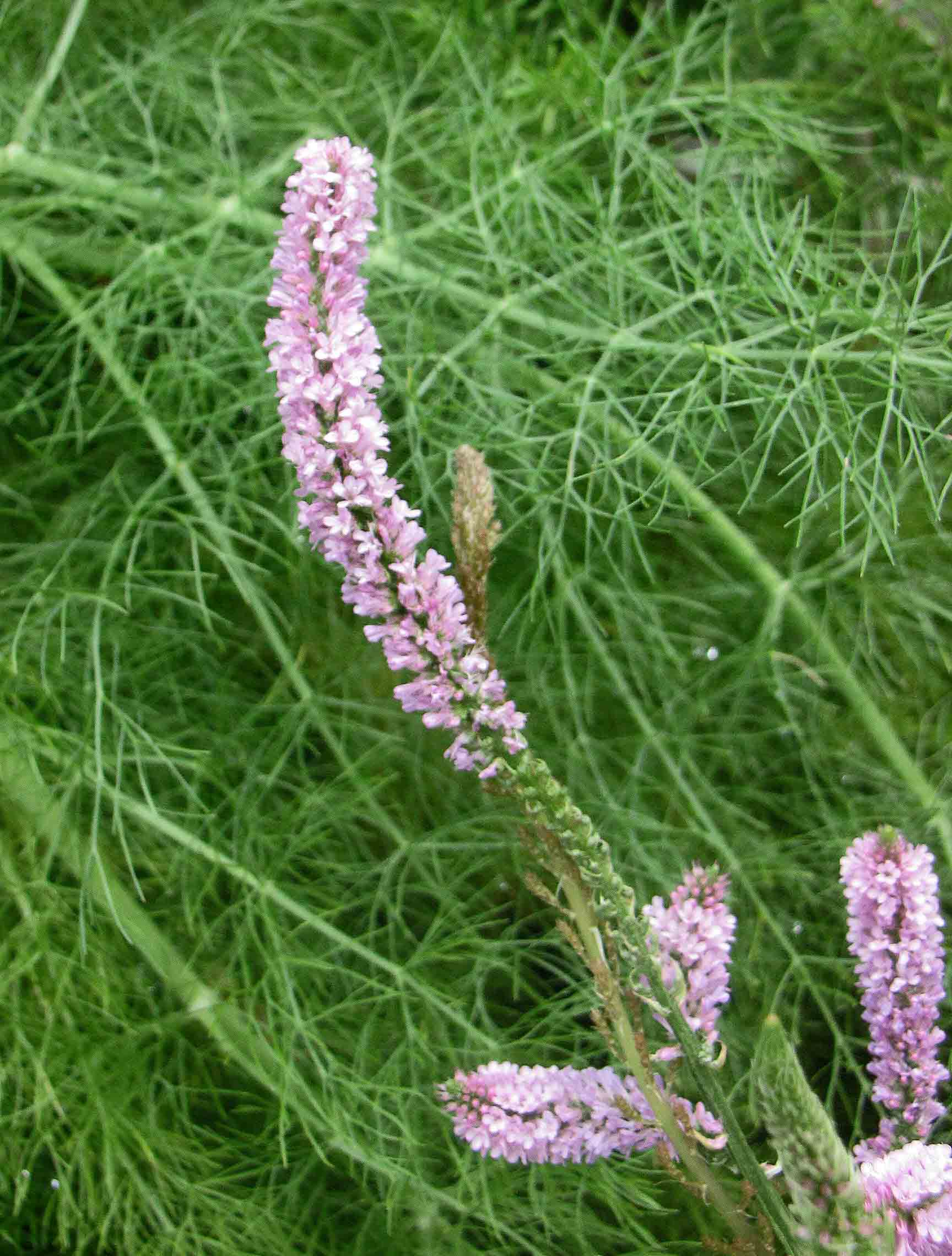
- Psylliostachys suworowii

Scientific classification
- Kingdom: Plantae
- Clade: Tracheophytes
- Clade: Angiosperms
- Clade: Eudicots
- Order: Caryophyllales
- Family: Plumbaginaceae
- Genus: Psylliostachys (Jaub. & Spach) Nevski

Type species
- Psylliostachys spicata

= Psylliostachys =

Genus of flowering plants

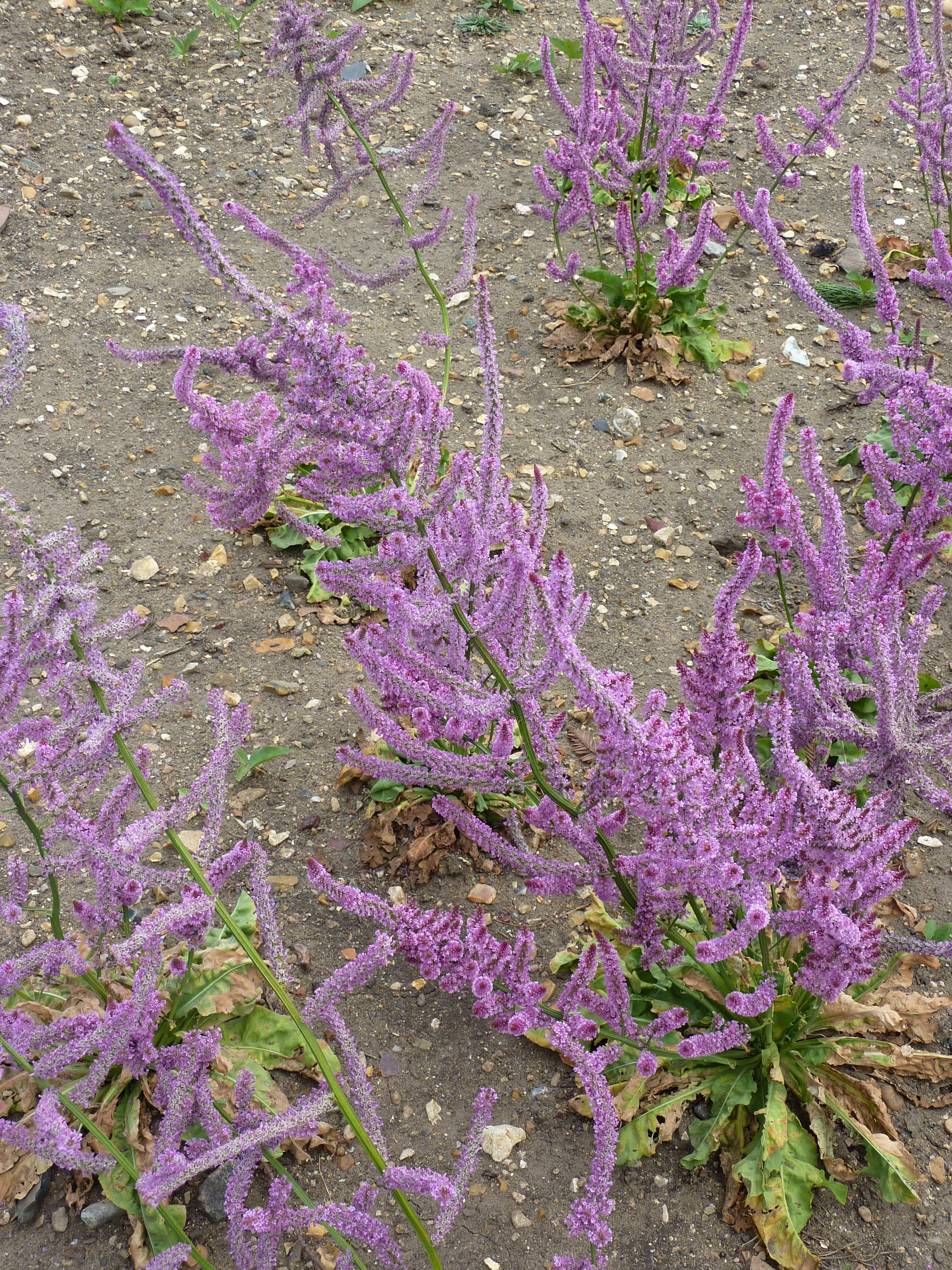
Psylliostachys suworowii

Psylliostachys is a genus of flowering plants belonging to the family Plumbaginaceae.

Its native range is South European Russia, Pakistan and Temperate Asia.

Species:

- Psylliostachys × afghanicus Roshkova
- Psylliostachys anceps (Regel) Roshkova
- Psylliostachys × androssovii Roshkova
- Psylliostachys beludshistanicus Roshkova
- Psylliostachys leptostachyus (Boiss.) Roshkova
- Psylliostachys × myosuroides (Regel) Roshkova
- Psylliostachys spicatus (Willd.) Nevski
- Psylliostachys suworowii (Regel) Roshkova
- Psylliostachys volkii Rech.f.
