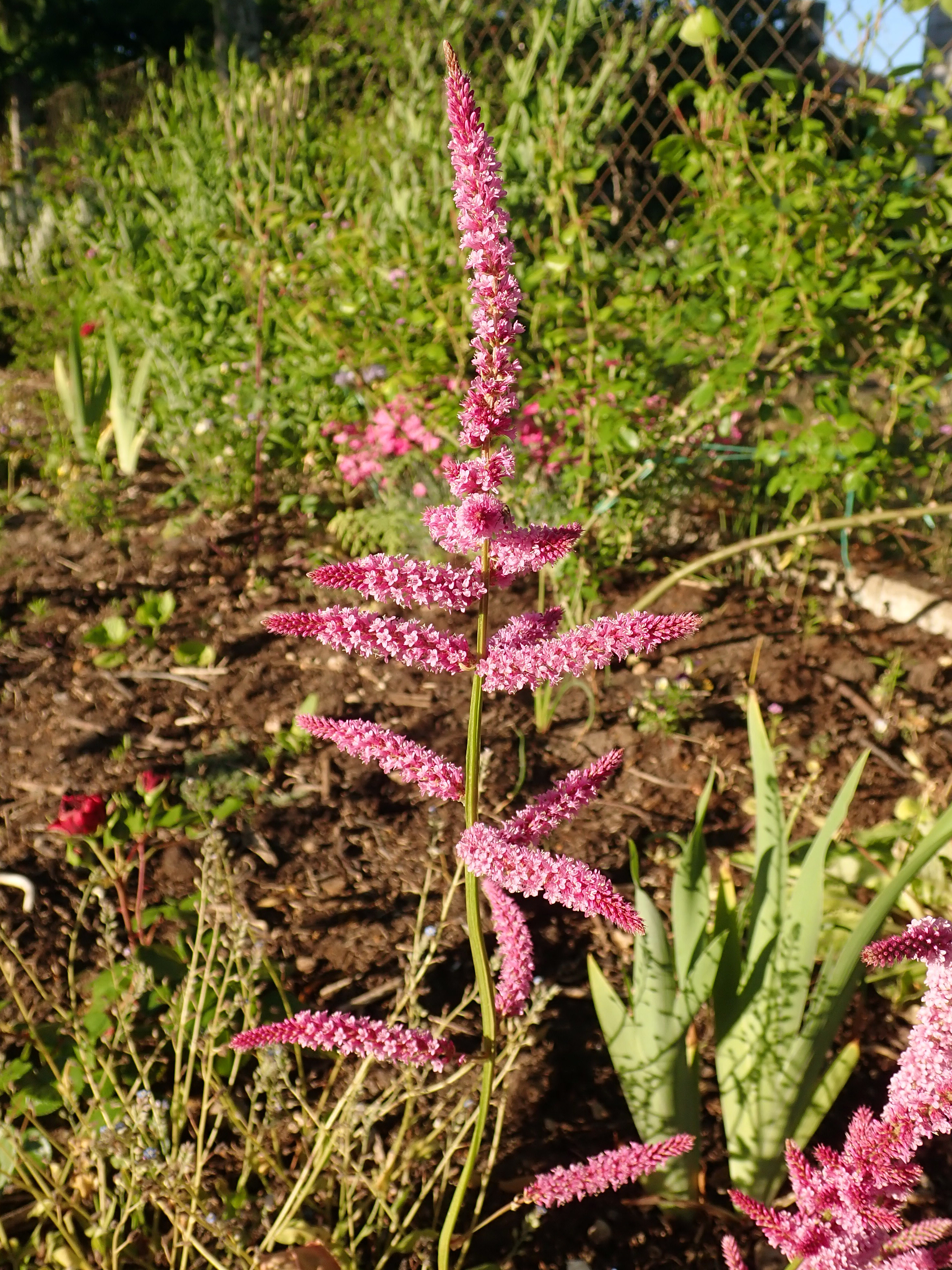
- In a garden setting
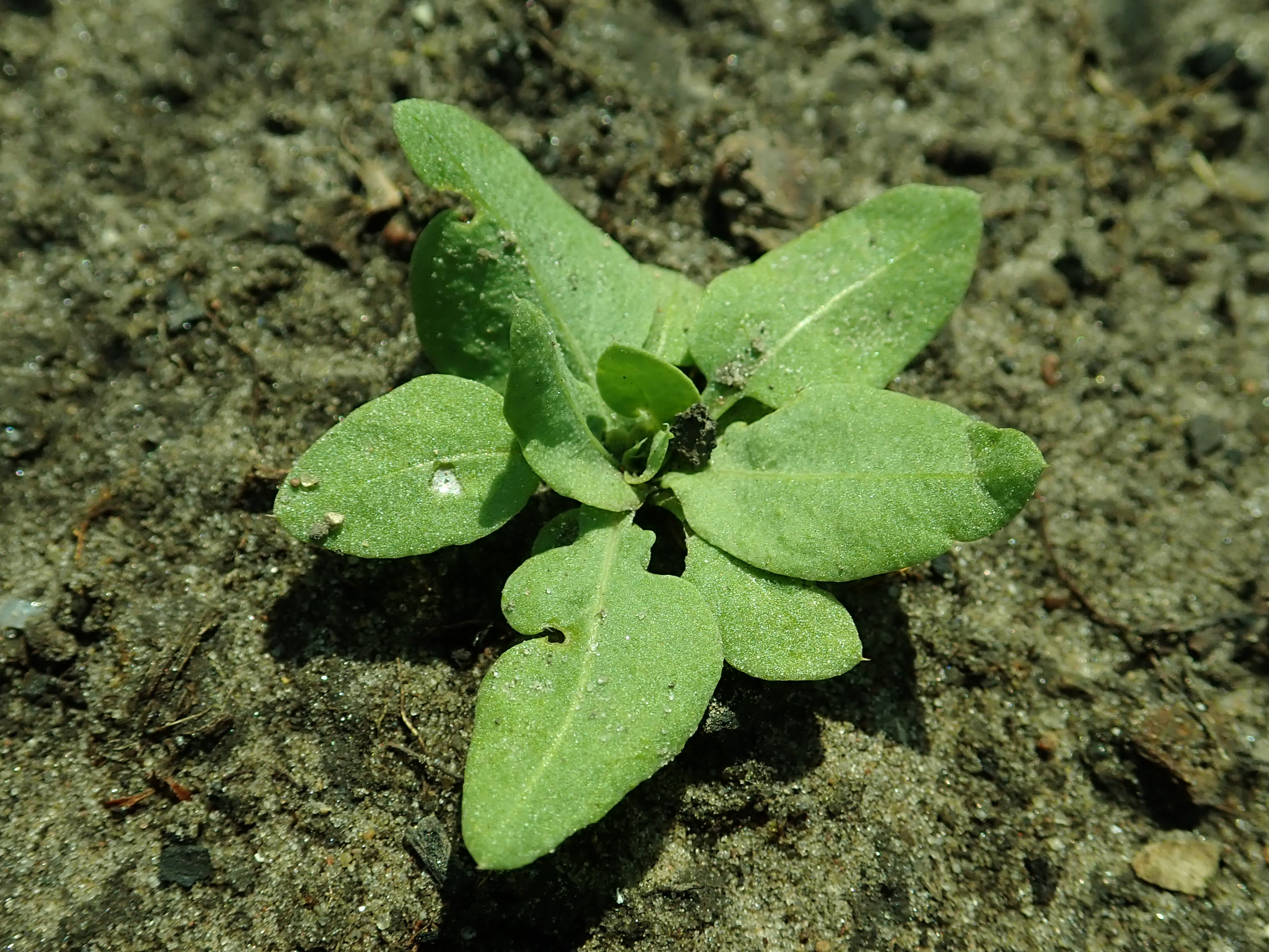
- Rosette

Scientific classification
- Kingdom: Plantae
- Clade: Tracheophytes
- Clade: Angiosperms
- Clade: Eudicots
- Order: Caryophyllales
- Family: Plumbaginaceae
- Genus: Psylliostachys
- Species: P. suworowii

Binomial name
- Psylliostachys suworowii (Regel) Roshkova

Synonyms
- Limonium superbum (Regel) F.T.Hubb. ex L.H.Bailey; Limonium suworowii (Regel) Kuntze; Statice macphersonii F.Muell.; Statice spicata var. glabra Regel; Statice superba Regel; Statice suworowii Regel

= Psylliostachys suworowii =

Species of plant

Psylliostachys suworowii, the poker statice or Russian statice, is a species of flowering plant in the family Plumbaginaceae, native to Central Asia and Afghanistan, and introduced to scattered locales worldwide. An annual typically 50 cm (20 in) tall, it is widely cultivated as an ornamental.

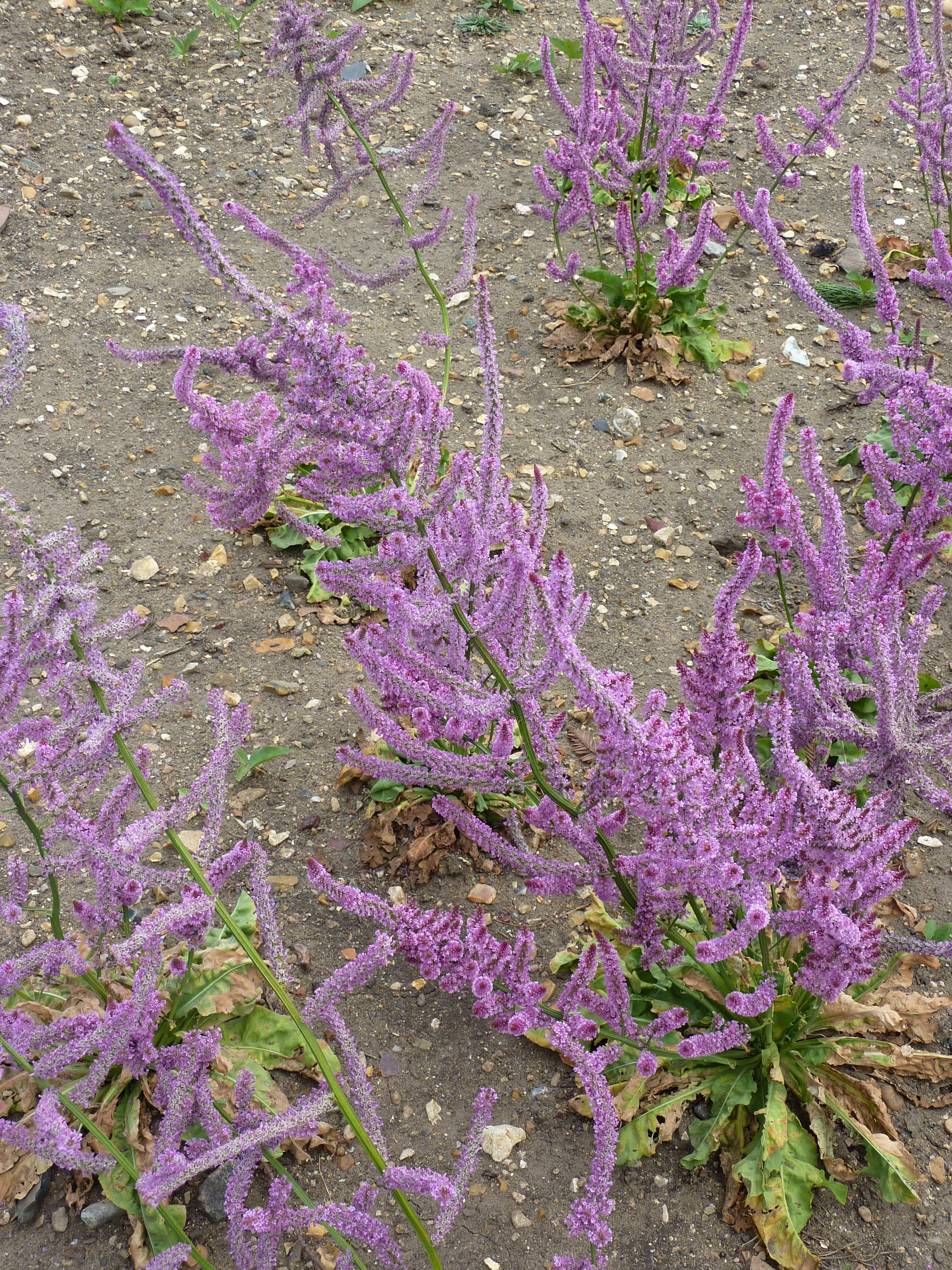
A more mauve colored specimen

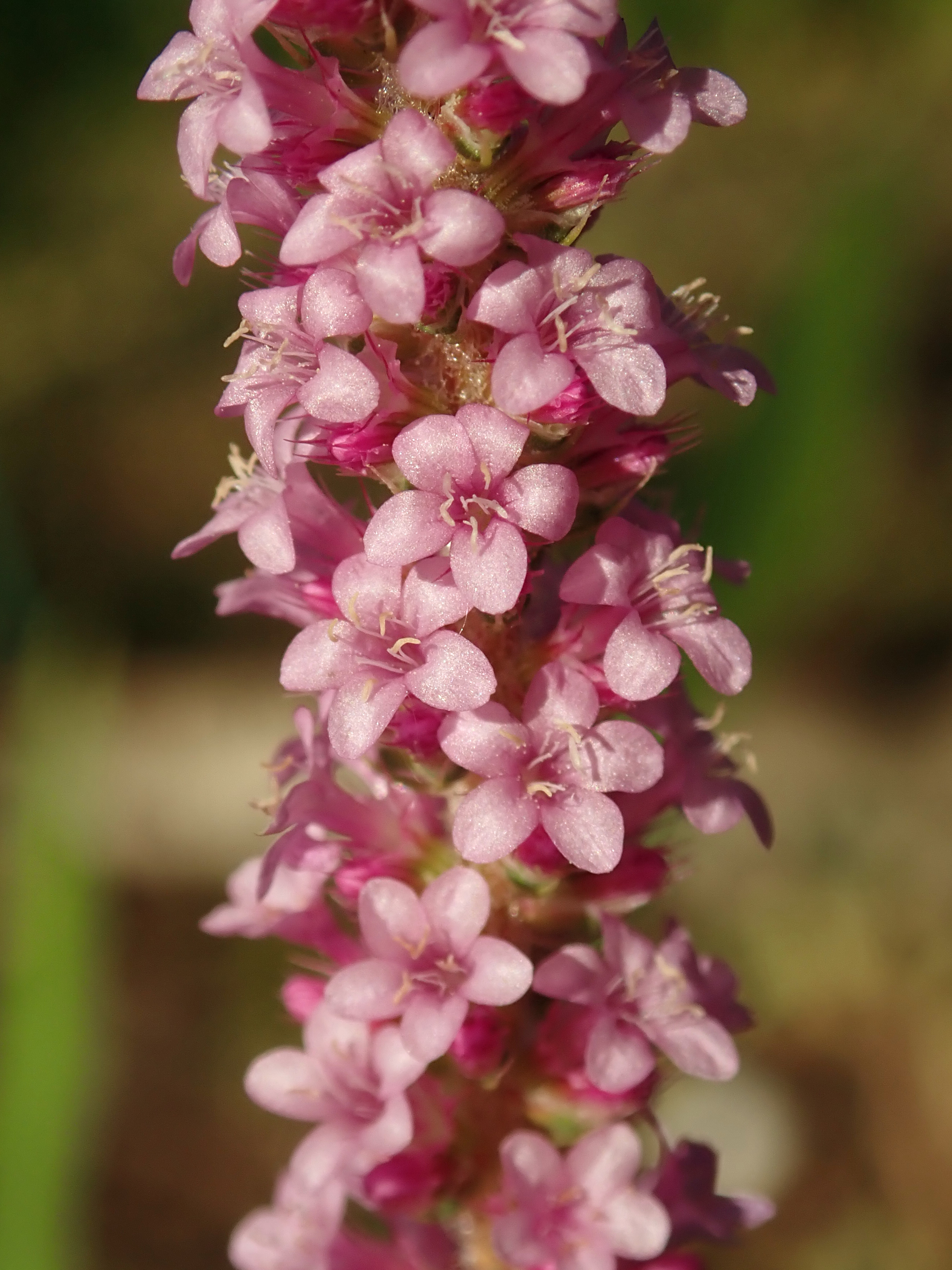
Close-up of flowers

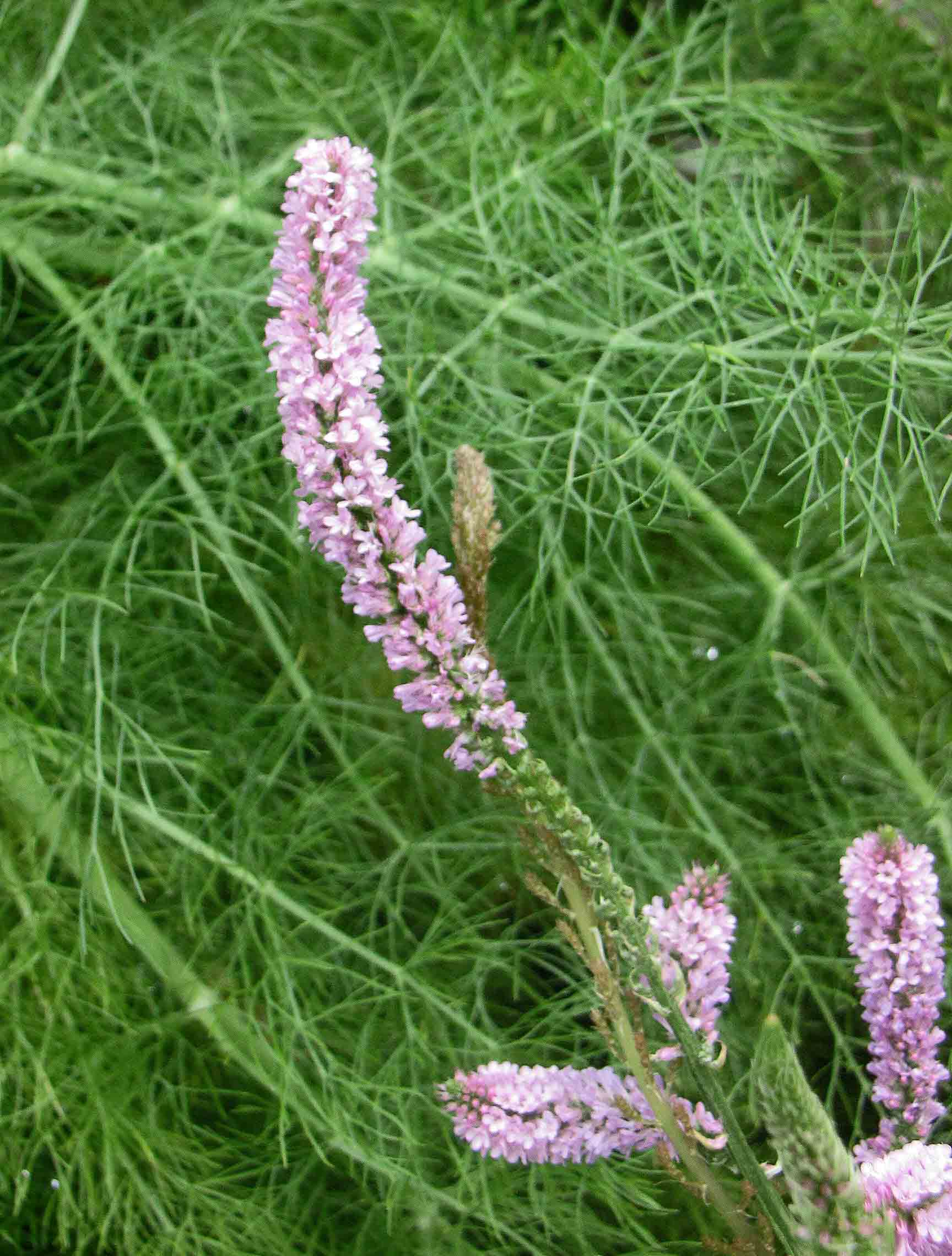
At the Hong Kong Flower Show

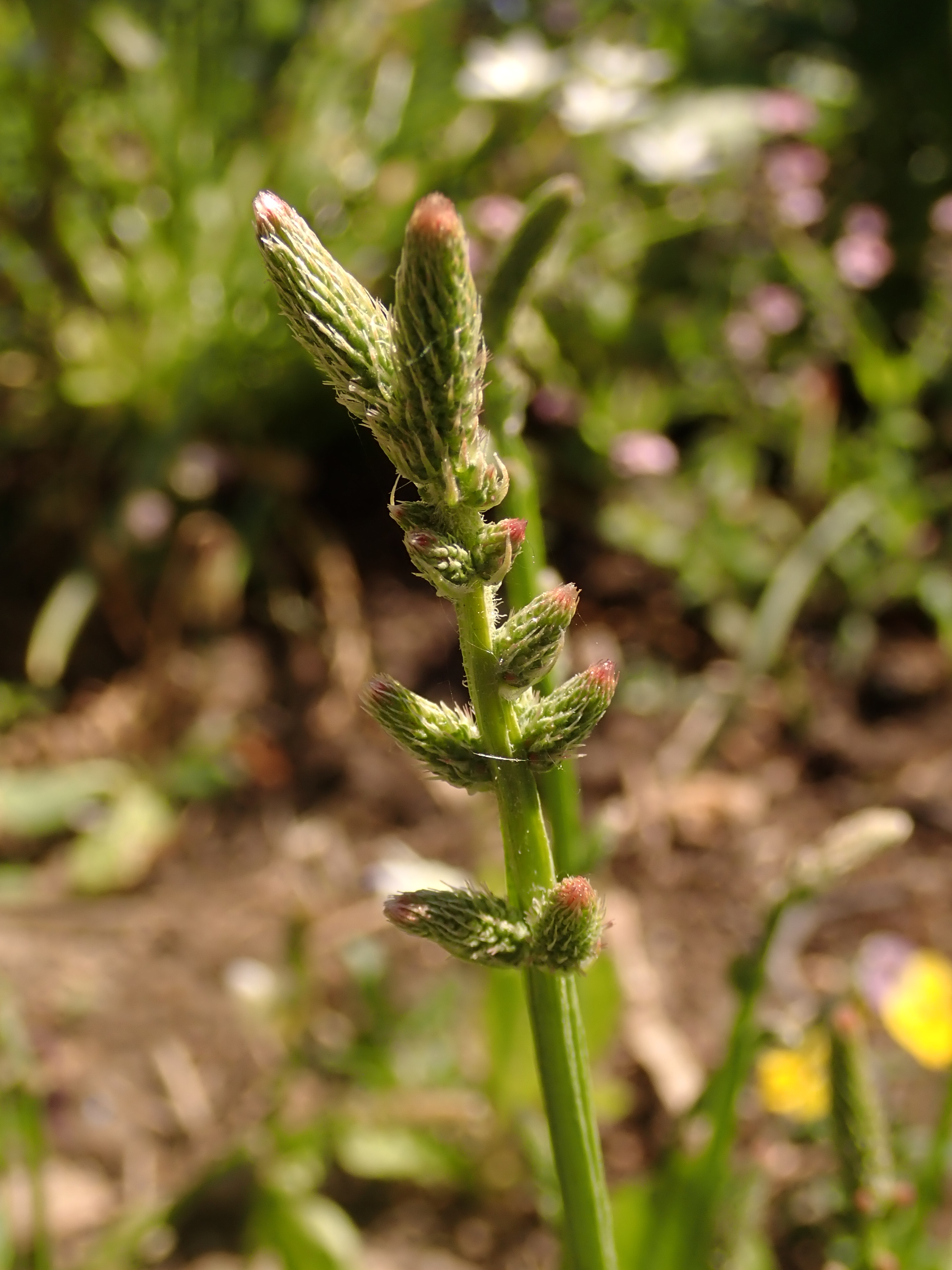
Developing spikes

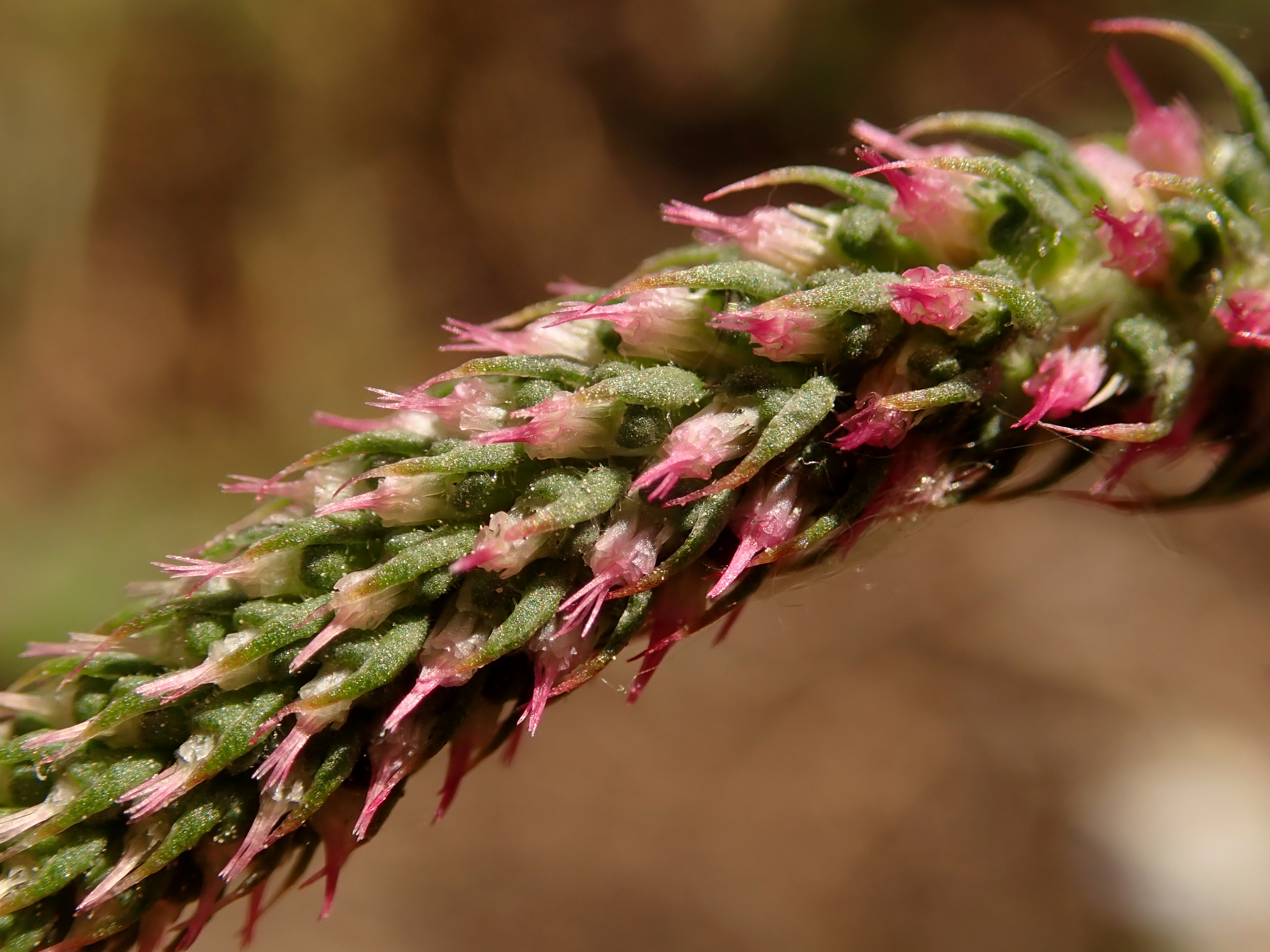
Flower buds

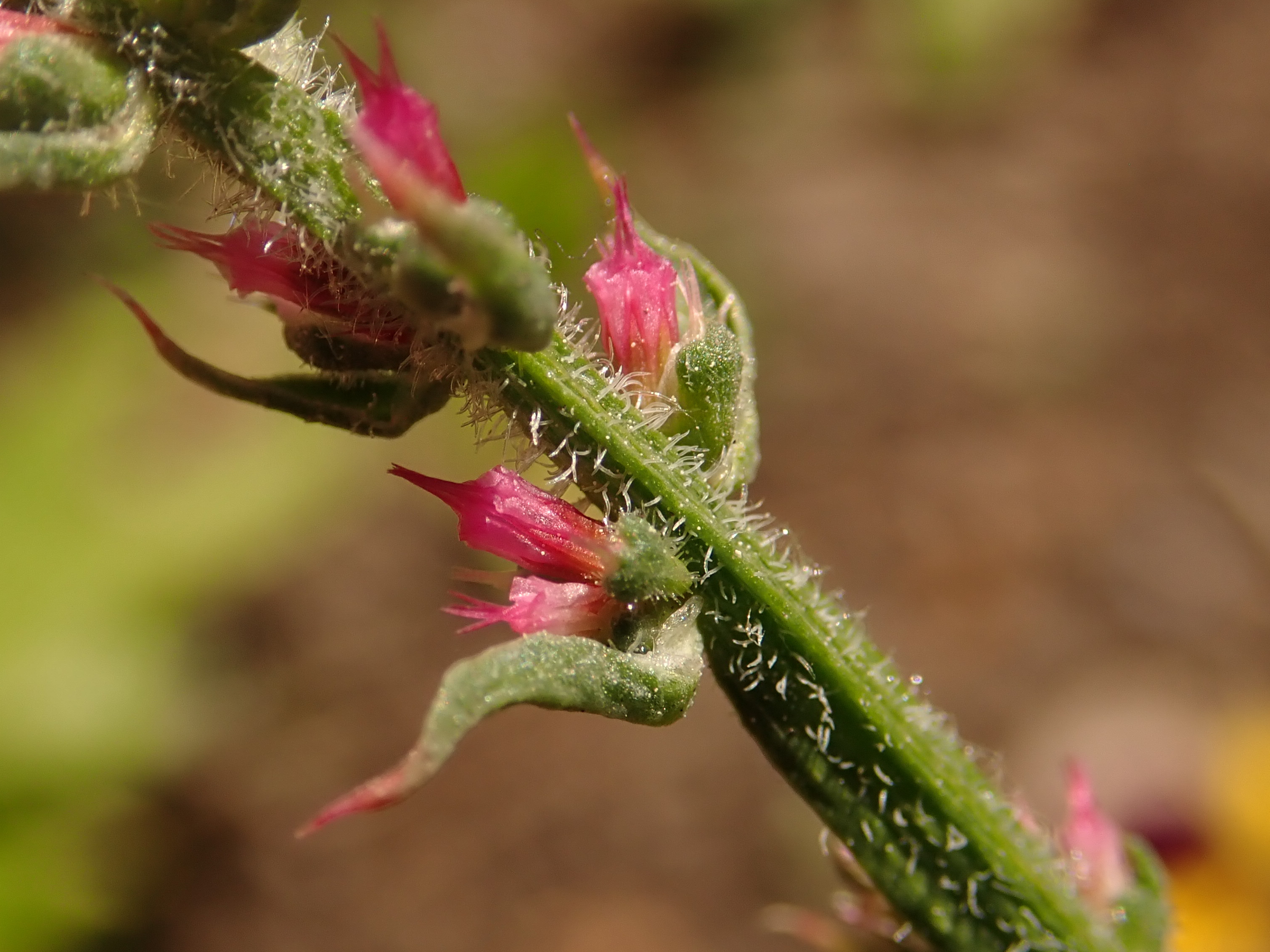
Close-up of stem

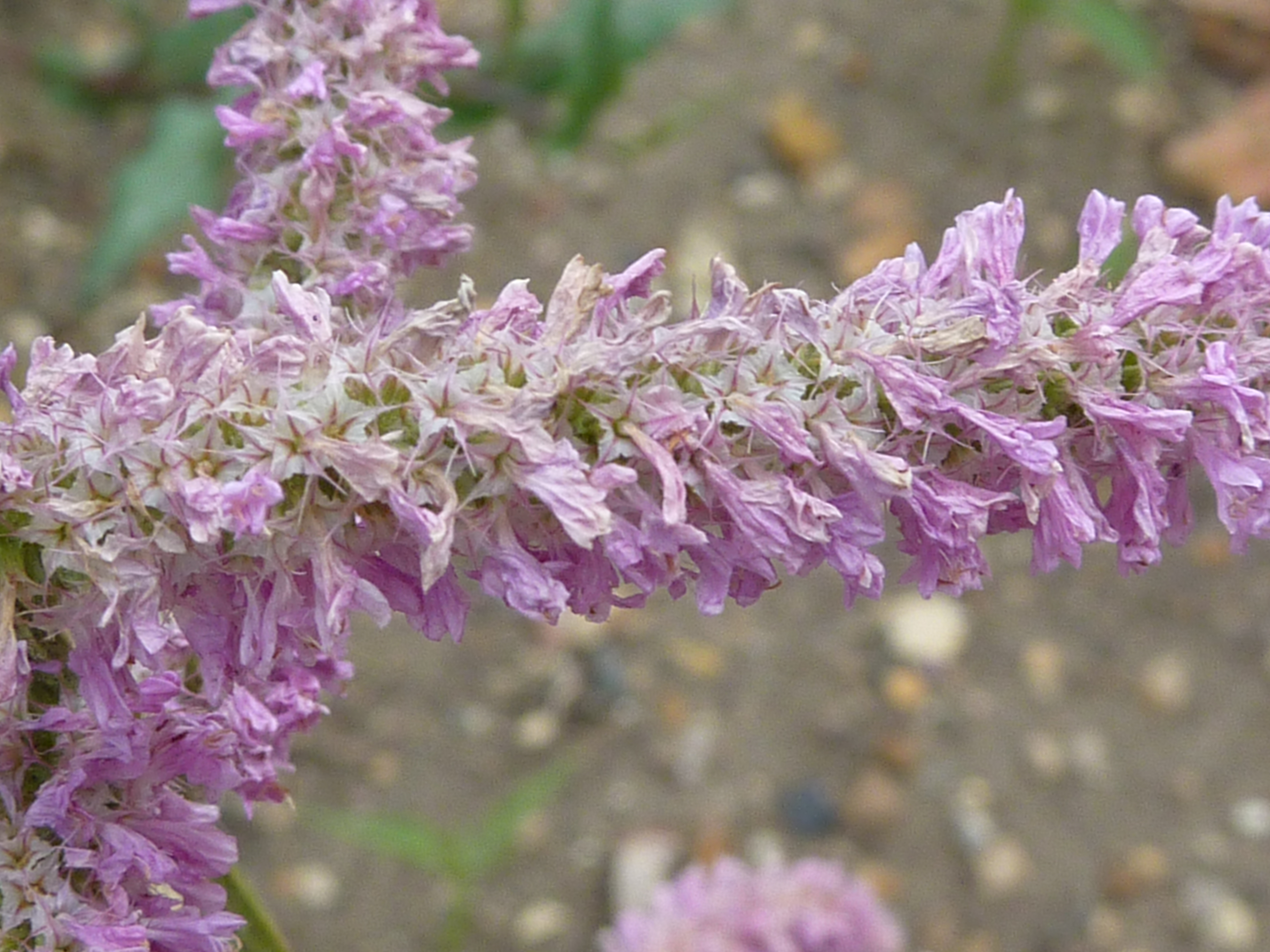
Nearly spent flowers
