= North Island (Houtman Abrolhos) =

Island in the Houtman Abrolhos, off the coast of Mid West Western Australia

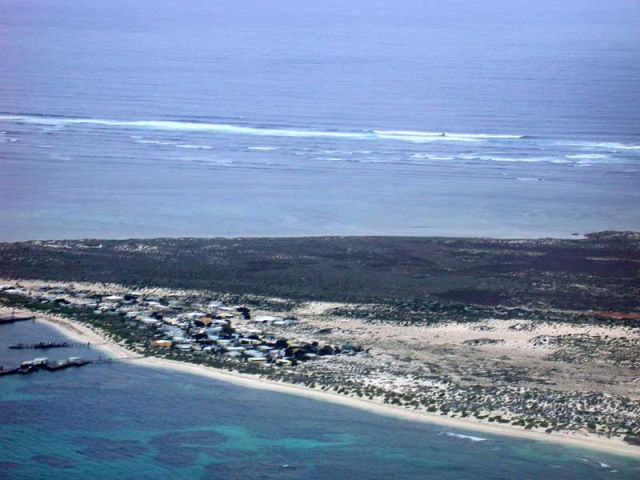
- Aerial photograph of the southern half of North Island, looking west

Geography
- Location: Indian Ocean, off the coast of Western Australia
- Coordinates: 28°18′9″S 113°35′41″E
- Archipelago: Houtman Abrolhos
- Area: 180 ha (440 acres)
- Length: 2 km (1.2 mi)
- Width: 1.5 km (0.93 mi)
- Highest elevation: 13 m (43 ft)
- Highest point: Record Hill

Administration
- Australia
- State: Western Australia

Demographics
- Population: Seasonally inhabited by about 130 lobster fishers (2003)

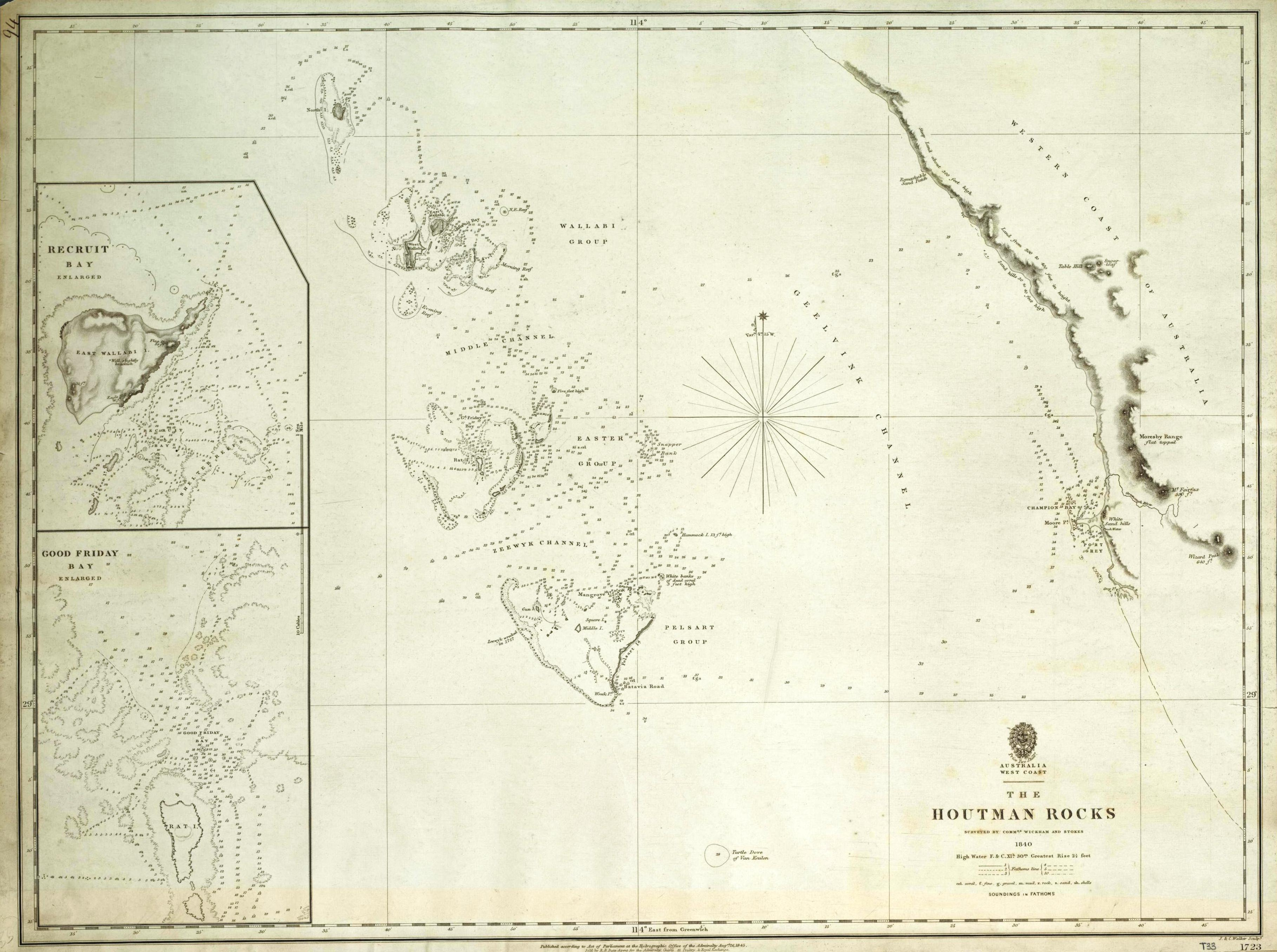
The first published map showing North Island was an 1845 British Admiralty chart entitled "The Houtman Rocks".

North Island is the northernmost island in the Houtman Abrolhos, a coral reef archipelago in the Indian Ocean off the coast of Mid West Western Australia. Located about 14 km (9 mi) from the nearest island group, it is one of the largest islands in the Houtman Abrolhos, and one of the few to support dune systems. It has relatively diverse flora dominated by chenopod shrubs and fauna that includes the introduced tammar wallaby, around seven species of reptile, and about 15 resident bird species.

First recorded and surveyed in 1840, North Island has been a seasonal camp for western rock lobster fishermen since the beginning of the 20th century, and this remains the principal focus of human activity on the island. There is also a small amount of tourism, though for the most part it is reserved as conservation habitat for vegetation communities and rare birds.

== History ==
=== Discovery ===
The earliest recorded sighting of North Island occurred in May 1840, during the third survey voyage of HMS Beagle, commanded by John Clements Wickham. It was sighted from the peak of Flag Hill on East Wallabi Island in early May, explored on 22 May, and given its name due to "its relative position to the remainder of Houtman's Abrolhos". Before he left the island, Wickham left a letter in a bottle atop the highest hill, which he accordingly christened Record Hill.

A map of the island first appeared in 1845 on a British Admiralty chart entitled "The Houtman Rocks". The following year, Wickham's lieutenant, John Lort Stokes, published the first account of the island in his Discoveries in Australia. He observed:

"The island was about a mile across, and nearly circular. It was surrounded by a range of hills, with a flat in the centre, covered with coarse grass, where a great many quails were flushed, affording good sport, but not a single wallaby."

=== Development of industry and infrastructure ===
A western rock lobster fishery developed on the island in the early 20th century. There are records of the island being used as a base for crayfishers as early as 1902, and for many years it was used as an anchorage by anglers. It was not until 1947, however, that a seasonally inhabited permanent camp was established there. According to former crayfisher Ron Bertelsen, the first camp was established by skippers George Barker and George Nelson and deckhand John Long, who relocated there when lobsters around Pigeon Island grew scarce. They camped at the southern end of North Island in a camp initially built from packing case timbers. A local carrier boat, the Betty Margaret, serviced the camp. From about 40 seasonal inhabitants in 1940, the population grew to about 130 by 2003. An airstrip was built in 1979.

=== Visits by naturalists ===
A number of naturalists have visited the island, starting with the Percy Sladen Trust Expedition to the Abrolhos Islands in 1913. This expedition spent little time on North Island, as shore collecting was not very successful there, and other islands appeared better suited to their work. Expedition members nevertheless published substantial information about the island, including a description of its physiography and a list of its vertebrates.

Australian ornithologist Dom Serventy visited the island in 1945 but left no published account. In 1959, a group from the University of Western Australia's Department of Zoology, accompanied by the English botanist Mary Gillham, travelled to the island; a brief article on its physiography, vegetation and vertebrate fauna was published the following year by Glen Storr. More recent visitors have included P. R. Howden in 1974, Robert Ivan Taylor Prince in 1976, Ronald Eric Johnstone in 1981 and 1983, Phillip Fuller in 1992, and Judith Harvey and Vanda Longman in 1999.

== Geography ==
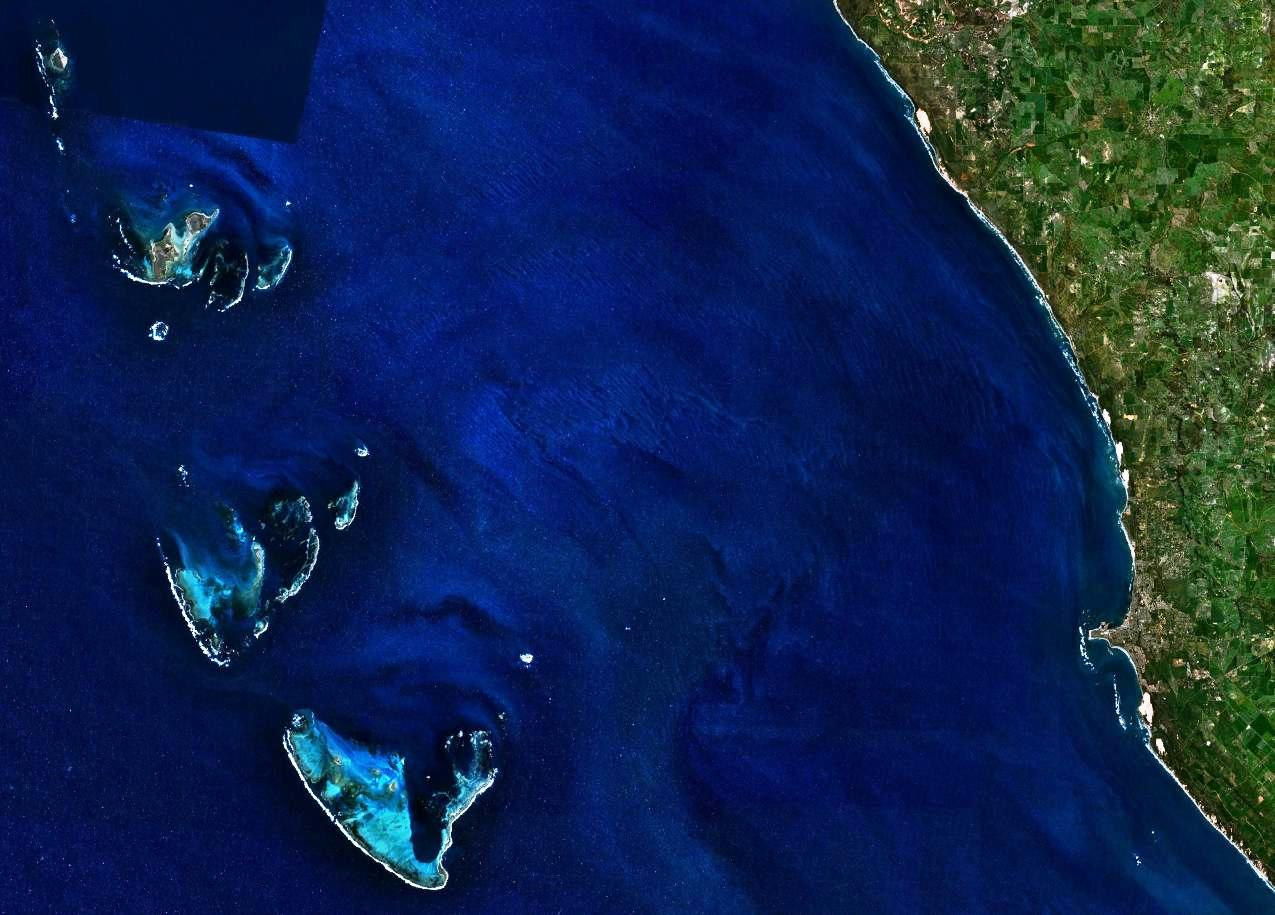
A view from space of the Houtman Abrolhos and adjacent Western Australian coast; North Island is in the top left corner.

Nominally located at 28°18′9″S 113°35′41″E, North Island is an isolated island, separated from its nearest neighbours in the Wallabi Group by the 14 km (9 mi) wide South Passage. Despite this separation, it is sometimes treated as part of that group. It is roughly diamond-shaped and is approximately 2 km (1 1/4 mi) long from south to north, and 1 1/2 km (1 mi) from west to east, giving it an area of about 180 hectares (450 ac).

Two high points are named Record Hill and Latitude Hill. These are the only gazetted places on the island, although some other features have informal names: The most northerly and southerly point on the island have been called "North Point" and "South Point" respectively, and in 1960 a high point in the northwest corner of the island was referred to as "Northwest Hill".

On the eastern side is a seasonally inhabited permanent fishers' camp. There is an unnamed lighthouse on the western side, a trig point on the eastern side, and a gravel airstrip near the centre.

The island is surrounded by a coral reef flat. This extends about 1 1/2 km (1 mi) to the west of the island, and over 3 km (2 mi) to the north and south, but the reef margin lies quite close to the island on the eastern side. Most of the reef is not navigable, but a passage through the reef just north of the island is named Suda Bay Passage; one just south of the island is named Barker Passage; and there are a few breaks or channels on the eastern side of the island where boats may obtain shelter in bad weather. An area of reef immediately north of the island is named The Flat, and at the northern extreme of the reef is a breaker named The Big Breaker. About 200 m (660 ft) west of the island is a small rock informally known as "Shag Rock", but with no official name; it differs from Shag Rock in the Wallabi Group further south.

Like the rest of the Houtman Abrolhos, North Island is Australian territory. It is a part of Western Australia, and falls within the boundaries of the federal Electoral Division of Durack and the state electoral district of Geraldton. It is part of the Houtman Abrolhos Nature Reserve, an A-class reserve managed by Western Australia's Department of Fisheries.

== Geology and physiography ==
The basement of North Island is the Wallabi Limestone, a dense calcretised, coral limestone platform that underlies the entire Wallabi Group. Arising abruptly from a flat shelf, it is about 40 m (131 ft) thick, and of Quaternary origin. Areas of reef that formed during the Eemian interglacial (about 125,000 years ago), when sea levels were higher than at present, are now emergent in places, and these form the basement of the group's central platform islands, namely West Wallabi Island, East Wallabi Island and North Island.

North Island's basement for the most part does not exceed 1.5 m (4 ft 11 in) in elevation. Much of it is capped by aeolianite, and nearly all of it is covered with sand, but there are some exposed outcrops. The southern margin of the island, for example, takes the form of a low cliff, which is severely undercut by the sea in many places.

There are extensive dunes of unconsolidated Holocene sand along both the western and eastern sides of the island. The topography of these dunes varies with time: in 1913, Dakin recorded the dunes as being a good deal higher in the east than in the west, but in 1960 Storr found the eastern dunes to be severely eroded, apparently because of a fire that burnt much of the island's vegetation in 1935. In the centre of the island is a low plain with a sinkhole in its southwest corner and a small salt lake near its northern edge. The soil in the centre of the plain is shallow loam, whereas the rim is deeper and composed largely of shell fragments.

== Climate ==
An automatic weather station has been installed on the island since 1990, and hourly measures of precipitation, air temperature, wind speed, wind direction, relative humidity and atmospheric pressure have been publicly available since then. This is the only weather station in the Houtman Abrolhos, so its data underlies climatic models of the island chain as a whole. Based on the data for North Island, the Houtman Abrolhos has been described as having a Semi-arid climate with warm, dry summers and cooler, wet winters. Mean temperatures range from 9.3 to 19.5 °C (49 to 67 °F) in July, and from 19.1 to 32.4 °C (66 to 90 °F) in February. This is a substantially smaller range than on the mainland: the summer temperature is typically a degree cooler, while winter temperatures are a good deal warmer. This is due to the influence of the ocean, in particular the Leeuwin Current.

Eighty-six percent of the island's rain falls between April and September; on average there are 89 rain days, resulting in 469 mm (18 in) of rain. The wettest month is June, when over 100 mm (4 in) typically falls. In contrast, only about 70 mm (3 in) can be expected to fall between October and March.

It is nearly always windy. During summer a high-pressure ridge lies to the south, causing persistent winds from the southeast or southwest at speeds exceeding 17 kn (31 km/h) almost half the time. During autumn and winter, the ridge moves north, increasing atmospheric pressure over the islands and creating variable winds. Winter tends to produce both the strongest gales and the most frequent periods of calm. In addition to these winds, there is daily pattern of land breezes in the morning, followed by the onset of south-westerly sea breezes in the afternoon. This pattern is caused by temperature differences between the land and the ocean; it is not as strong in the Houtman Abrolhos chain as on the mainland, but is present.

Three classes of storm have been identified in the region. Brief squalls may occur between December and April. A tropical cyclone occurs in the area about once in three years, between January and April; these may generate extremely high wind speeds that are potentially destructive. During winter, extra-tropical cyclones sometimes pass south of Geraldton, generating winter gales with gusts of up to 35 m/s (115 ft/s), the wind direction from the northwest initially, then gradually moving around to southerly.

Climate data for North Island (28º20'S, 113º35'E, 2 m AMSL) (2000-2024 normals and extremes)
Month	Jan	Feb	Mar	Apr	May	Jun	Jul	Aug	Sep	Oct	Nov	Dec	Year
Record high °C (°F)	38.5 (101.3)	41.0 (105.8)	39.1 (102.4)	34.5 (94.1)	29.4 (84.9)	27.1 (80.8)	26.6 (79.9)	27.2 (81.0)	31.1 (88.0)	33.4 (92.1)	34.0 (93.2)	39.4 (102.9)	41.0 (105.8)
Mean daily maximum °C (°F)	27.7 (81.9)	28.5 (83.3)	28.2 (82.8)	26.3 (79.3)	24.4 (75.9)	22.3 (72.1)	21.2 (70.2)	21.6 (70.9)	22.3 (72.1)	23.5 (74.3)	25.3 (77.5)	26.8 (80.2)	24.8 (76.7)
Mean daily minimum °C (°F)	21.4 (70.5)	22.0 (71.6)	22.0 (71.6)	20.4 (68.7)	18.4 (65.1)	16.5 (61.7)	15.4 (59.7)	15.4 (59.7)	16.0 (60.8)	17.2 (63.0)	18.5 (65.3)	20.1 (68.2)	18.6 (65.5)
Record low °C (°F)	15.7 (60.3)	17.2 (63.0)	15.4 (59.7)	13.1 (55.6)	7.9 (46.2)	7.1 (44.8)	6.2 (43.2)	6.8 (44.2)	8.1 (46.6)	9.7 (49.5)	11.5 (52.7)	15.1 (59.2)	6.2 (43.2)
Average precipitation mm (inches)	2.3 (0.09)	10.5 (0.41)	5.6 (0.22)	14.9 (0.59)	40.3 (1.59)	62.6 (2.46)	66.1 (2.60)	36.5 (1.44)	19.0 (0.75)	8.2 (0.32)	6.9 (0.27)	3.5 (0.14)	273.1 (10.75)
Average precipitation days (≥ 1 mm)	0.4	0.9	1.0	2.2	5.7	8.4	8.8	6.4	3.4	1.7	1.3	0.6	40.8
Average afternoon relative humidity (%)	63	63	62	61	58	55	56	56	56	58	58	60	59
Average dew point °C (°F)	17.9 (64.2)	18.6 (65.5)	17.9 (64.2)	16.4 (61.5)	14.1 (57.4)	11.2 (52.2)	10.3 (50.5)	10.5 (50.9)	10.9 (51.6)	12.5 (54.5)	14.5 (58.1)	16.0 (60.8)	14.2 (57.6)
Source: Bureau of Meteorology

== Flora ==
Most of North Island is dominated by chenopod shrubs, generally less than a metre (3 ft) high. The beach vegetation is largely Spinifex longifolius (beach spinifex), Salsola kali (prickly saltwort), Atriplex cinerea (grey saltbush) and naturalised Cakile maritima (sea rocket). Stable dunes are vegetated by Atriplex paludosa (marsh saltbush), Scaevola crassifolia (thick-leaved fan-flower), Olearia axillaris (coastal daisy-bush), Myoporum insulare (blueberry tree) and Exocarpos sparteus (broom ballart). Sheltered areas behind dunes support Salsola kali and Myoporum insulare and also Nitraria billardierei (nitre bush), the last of these being the only plant on the island to grow over 1 1/2 m (5 ft) high. In areas where limestone is close to the surface, the vegetation consists of Pimelea microcephala (shrubby rice-flower), Spyridium globulosum (basket bush) and Acanthocarpus preissii.

The rim of the central plain is vegetated by a dense shrubland of Rhagodia baccata (berry saltbush), Atriplex paludosa and Threlkeldia diffusa (coast bonefruit). Nearer the centre, the vegetation consists of Frankenia pauciflora (seaheath), Muellerolimon salicorniaceum and Tecticornia arbuscula (bulli bulli), although T. arbuscula is replaced by Tecticornia halocnemoides (shrubby samphire) where the soil is shallow. The most low-lying area of the central plain, south of the salt lake, is water-logged in winter; it is vegetated by a dense mat of Sarcocornia quinqueflora (beaded samphire), Sporobolus virginicus (marine couch) and Suaeda australis (seablite).

The dune, limestone and salt lake vegetation communities on North Island are considered to have high conservation significance. The dune and limestone communities have high biodiversity, are highly sensitive to disturbance and regenerate slowly. The salt lake community is considered significant because of the rarity of salt lakes on offshore islands.

According to a survey published in 2001, the following vascular plants occur on North Island:

- Acanthocarpus preissii
- Actinobole condensatum
- Atriplex cinerea (grey saltbush)
- Atriplex paludosa (marsh saltbush)
- Austrodanthonia caespitosa
- Austrostipa crinita
- Austrostipa variabilis
- Avena fatua (wild oat) (naturalised)
- Brachyscome ciliaris
- Bromus arenarius (sand brome)
- Bromus diandrus (great brome) (naturalised)
- Bromus hordeaceus (soft brome) (naturalised)
- Bromus madritensis (Madrid brome) (naturalised)
- Bulbine semibarbata (leek lily)
- Cakile maritima (sea rocket) (naturalised)
- Calandrinia calyptrata (pink purslane)
- Carpobrotus virescens (coastal pigface)
- Chenopodium murale (nettle-leaf goosefoot) (naturalised)
- Crassula colorata (dense stonecrop)
- Cynodon dactylon (couch) (naturalised)
- Daucus glochidiatus (Australian carrot)
- Dodonaea aptera (coast hop-bush)
- Enchylaena tomentosa (barrier saltbush)
- Eragrostis dielsii (mallee lovegrass)
- Erodium cicutarium (common storksbill) (naturalised)
- Erodium cygnorum (blue heronsbill)
- Euchiton sphaericus
- Euphorbia tannensis
- Exocarpos sparteus (broom ballart)
- Ficinia nodosa (knotted club rush)
- Frankenia pauciflora (seaheath)
- Grevillea argyrophylla (silvery-leaved grevillea)
- Helichrysum luteoalbum (Jersey cudweed)
- Hordeum murinum subsp. leporinum (barley grass) (naturalised)
- Hornungia procumbens (oval purse) (naturalised)
- Juncus bufonius (toad rush) (naturalised)
- Malva parviflora (marshmallow) (naturalised)
- Melilotus indicus (naturalised)
- Mesembryanthemum crystallinum (iceplant) (naturalised)
- Muellerolimon salicorniaceum
- Myoporum insulare (blueberry tree)
- Nicotiana occidentalis subsp. hesperis (native tobacco)
- Nitraria billardierei (nitre bush)
- Olearia axillaris (coastal daisy bush)
- Parapholis incurva (coast barbgrass) (naturalised)
- Parietaria debilis (pellitory)
- Phalaris minor (lesser canary grass) (naturalised)
- Pimelea microcephala (shrubby riceflower)
- Plantago debilis
- Podotheca angustifolia (sticky longheads)
- Rhagodia baccata (berry saltbush)
- Rhagodia latifolia
- Rostraria cristata (naturalised)
- Salsola kali (prickly saltwort) (naturalised)
- Sarcocornia quinqueflora (beaded samphire)
- Scaevola crassifolia (thick-leaved fan-flower)
- Schenkia australis (naturalised)
- Senecio glossanthus (slender groundsel)
- Senecio pinnatifolius
- Setaria dielsii (Diels' pigeon grass)
- Sonchus oleraceus (common sow thistle) (naturalised)
- Spergularia rubra (sand spurry) (naturalised)
- Spinifex longifolius (beach spinifex)
- Sporobolus virginicus (marine couch)
- Spyridium globulosum (basket bush)
- Stackhousia sp.
- Suaeda australis (seablite)
- Tecticornia arbuscula
- Tecticornia halocnemoides (shrubby samphire)
- Threlkeldia diffusa (coast bonefruit)
- Thysanotus patersonii
- Trichodesma zeylanicum (camel bush)
- Triglochin mucronata
- Triglochin trichophora
- Triticum aestivum (wheat) (naturalised)
- Vulpia myuros (Rat's tail fescue) (naturalised)
- Wurmbea monantha
- Zygophyllum simile

== Fauna ==
=== Mammals ===
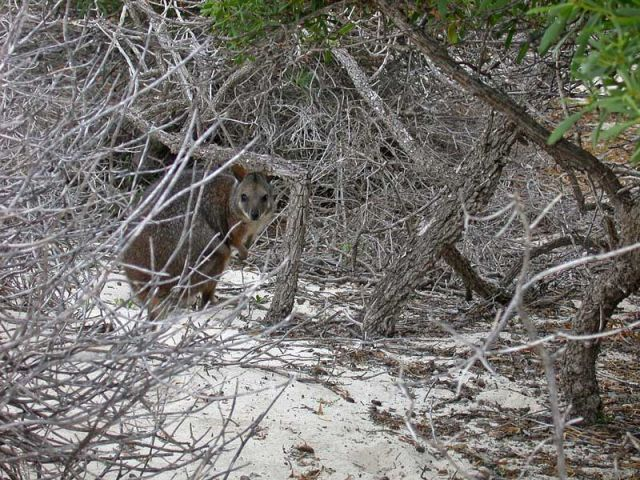
A tammar wallaby on North Island

No land mammals are known to be native to North Island, but the Australian sea lion (Neophoca cinerea) occasionally hauls out on the island's beaches, and it has been suggested that the island once had a native population of tammar wallaby (Macropus eugenii).

Stokes explicitly stated the tammar wallaby to be absent from North Island in 1840, and it was not recorded by the Percy Sladen Trust Expedition in 1913. It was apparently introduced to the island in the 1920s, as early fishermen reported seeing it between 1928 and 1930. This introduction failed, possibly due to overgrazing. The species was not found by Serventy during his 1945 visit, nor by Storr in 1959, but the latter found plenty of remains, mostly mandibles. Storr interpreted these remains as predating the 1920s introduction, suggesting that a native population of tammars became extinct on the island before 1840. Albert Russell Main agreed, but the theory has not been accepted by later researchers.

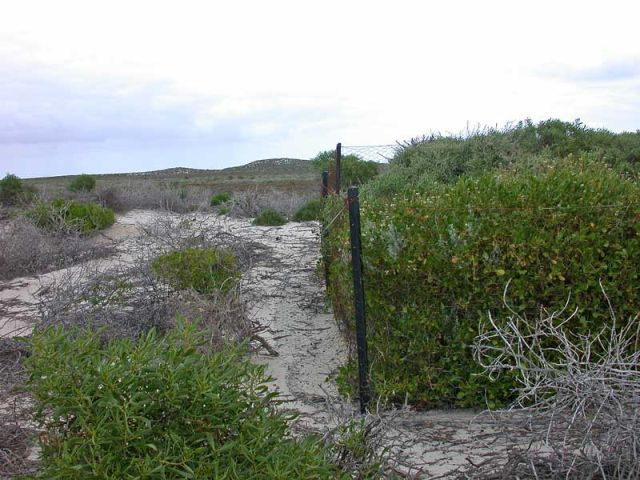
Much of North Island has been heavily overgrazed by tammar wallabies. Note the difference in vegetation density either side of the fence line.

In 1985, five tammar wallabies were introduced onto North Island, and the population established successfully. Possible reasons for this success include the absence of the wallabies' natural predator, the carpet python (Morelia spilota imbricata); the availability of additional food and water from the fishers' huts, which are occupied during the harshest time of the year; and the presence of the air strip, which apparently provides additional food for them. By the 2000s, there were over 450 tammar wallabies on the island. The wallabies overgrazed and ringbarked the native vegetation, particularly the area burnt in 1935, thus reducing vegetation cover and causing a serious decline in populations of some plant species. In 2003, island residents asked the Department of Conservation and Land Management (CALM; now the Department of Environment and Conservation) for help in managing the issue. CALM staff visited the island in April and May of that year and produced a report recommending an investigation into controlling population levels by the use of implanted contraceptives. Exploration of this option began in 2005, but in July 2007 the research was discontinued. Around 60 wallabies were removed to educational institutions for research purposes, and culling began. By February 2008, the wallaby population had been reduced to around 25 individuals.

The only other mammal known to occur on the island is the naturalised house mouse (Mus Musculus). Eight European rabbits (Oryctolagus cuniculus) were introduced in 1934, and were found to be "exceedingly numerous" by 1945, but by 1960 they were extinct, apparently from predation by feral cats. Neither rabbits nor cats are now reported as naturalised on the island.

=== Reptiles ===
Reptiles recorded on North Island include Binoe's prickly gecko (Heteronotia binoei), the gecko Christinus marmoratus, the Jew lizard (Pogona barbata), King's skink (Egernia kingii), the western limestone ctenotus (Ctenotus australis), the western worm lerista (Lerista praepedita), the common dwarf skink (Menetia greyii), and the Abrolhos bearded dragon (Pogona minor minima). The carpet python was reported as present on the island in very low numbers before 1960, but it has never been observed there by naturalists, and is now absent.

The green turtle (Chelonia mydas) has been observed in large numbers near the shore, and it has been claimed that they breed on the island, but this has never been verified. If it is true, then North Island would be the species' most southerly breeding site in Western Australia.

=== Birds ===
The birds most often mentioned in relation to North Island are the Abrolhos painted buttonquail (Turnix varius scintillans), a rare subspecies of the widespread painted buttonquail (Turnix varius) known only from the Wallabi Group and protected under the Wildlife Conservation Act 1950; and the brush bronzewing (Phaps elegans), one of the most common birds on North Island, the mainland populations of which are decreasing.

Other birds known to breed on North Island include the osprey (Pandion haliaetus cristatus), greater crested tern (Thalasseus bergii), Caspian tern (Hydroprogne caspia), silver gull (Chroicocephalus novaehollandiae novaehollandiae), and welcome swallow (Hirunda neoxena). Birds commonly recorded as resident on the island but not recorded as breeding there include the Pacific reef heron (Egretta sacra), white-bellied sea eagle (Haliaeetus leucogaster), red-capped plover (Charadrius ruficapillus), fairy tern (Sterna nereis nereis), Australian pipit (Antus australis) and western silvereye (Zosterops lateralis chloronotus). The sooty oystercatcher (Haematopus fuliginosus fuliginosus) and white-backed swallow (Cheramoeca leucosterna) have also rarely been observed as resident on the island.

The most common visitors to the island are the bar-tailed godwit (Limosa lapponica baueri), grey-tailed tattler (Tringa brevipes), ruddy turnstone (Arenaria interpres interpres), red-necked stint (Calidris ruficollis) and curlew sandpiper (Calidris ferruginea). Other observed visitors include the great cormorant (Phalacrocorax carbo novaehollandiae), nankeen kestrel (Falco cenchroides cenchroides), banded lapwing (Vanellus tricolor), greater sand plover (Charadrius leschenaultii), whimbrel (Numenius phaeopus variegatus), greenshank (Tringa nebularia), sanderling (Calidris alba), willie wagtail (Rhipidura leucophrys leucophrys) and brown songlark (Cincloramphus cruralis).

North Island is part of the Houtman Abrolhos Important Bird Area, identified as such by BirdLife International because of its importance for supporting large numbers of breeding seabirds.

== Human uses ==
The entire Houtman Abrolhos is protected by an A-class nature reserve that is wholly vested in Western Australia's Minister for Fisheries for purposes of "Conservation of Flora and Fauna, Tourism, and for Purposes Associated with the Fishing Industry".

=== Fishing industry ===
North Island's primary human use is as a seasonal camp for Western Rock Lobster fishers. During lobster season, which runs from 15 March to 30 June, North Island's camp is occupied by about 130 fishers. The camp is serviced by a carrier boat, the North Islander, which visits the island every three days, bringing supplies and taking out the catch and any domestic waste.

=== Conservation ===
North Island is considered to have high conservation value with respect to its populations of brush bronzewing and Abrolhos painted buttonquail, and its dune, limestone and salt lake vegetation communities. The potential existence of historically significant artefacts on Record Hill, namely the bottle left by Wickham and Stokes in 1840, has not been assessed.

A 514 ha (1,270 acres) area of reef immediately south of North Island is designated a Reef Observation Area (ROA). Fishing is prohibited in this area, except for the use of lobster pots. One of four ROAs in the Houtman Abrolhos, these protected areas are intended to help conserve species of territorial fish that are fished elsewhere, and to provide divers with the opportunity to observe large populations that are not frightened by their approach.

=== Tourism ===
With extensive sand beaches, seabird breeding areas, and good dive sites in the Reef Observation Area to the south of the island, North Island is considered an attractive tourist site. However, all of the island's limited anchorage and jetty space is occupied by commercial fishers, so landings from private or charter boats are possible only by prior arrangement. Moreover, visitors are not permitted to camp on the island. North Island accounts for about 3.5% of private recreational boat trips to the Houtman Abrolhos and about 1% of commercial charter boat trips. The most recent tourism plan for the Houtman Abrolhos supports the continued use of North Island by private charter boats and the use of the airstrip for tourism purposes, but recommends against the establishment of a land-based tourist site there.
