= Pigeon Island (Houtman Abrolhos) =

- Map of Pigeon Island

Geography
- Location: Indian Ocean, off the coast of Western Australia
- Coordinates: 28°27′18″S 113°43′34″E
- Archipelago: Houtman Abrolhos
- Area: 4.3 ha (11 acres)
- Length: 430 m (1410 ft)
- Width: 140 m (460 ft)
- Highest elevation: 3 m (10 ft)

Administration
- Australia
- State: Western Australia

Demographics
- Population: Seasonally inhabited by lobster fishers (2006)

Pigeon Island is a small island located near the middle of the Wallabi Group of the Houtman Abrolhos, an archipelago off the coast of Western Australia. It is almost entirely given over to western rock lobster fishers' camps, and as a result is far more disturbed than most other islands in the archipelago. A nearby island also seasonally populated by fishers is named Little Pigeon Island, hence Pigeon Island is sometimes referred to as "Big Pigeon Island".

== History ==
The geographic location of Pigeon Island suggests that it might have been visited by survivors of the 1629 Batavia shipwreck, but there is no surviving evidence of this, either documentary or archaeological. It was mined for guano in the 20th century.

== Geography ==
Pigeon Island is roughly triangular in shape, with a short side on the south west, and two long sides coming together at a point in the north east. The island is covered with infrastructure, with a high density of huts covering the entire island, right down to the water line; in total there are 54 camps, a school and a pub. There are also around 20 jetties, mainly along the northwest side, as this is the only direction from which the island may be approached by boat. The island is surrounded by reef to the south and east, but a passage known as Pigeon Island Anchorage runs along the northwest side.

Pigeon Island is seasonally populated by a great many Western Rock Lobster fishers, and Pigeon Island Anchorage represents the only safe approach to the island. It is thus heavily used as both a navigational passage and as an anchorage.

This passage was used by the Sardam in 1629. Arriving at the group in search of survivors of the Batavia shipwreck, it entered the passage, anchoring off Barge Rock in order to land a party of men on East Wallabi Island.

== Geology and physiography ==
The basement of Pigeon Island is the Wallabi Limestone, a dense calcretised, coral limestone platform that underlies the entire Wallabi Group. This platform, which arises abruptly from a flat shelf, is about 40 metres thick, and is of Quaternary origin. Reef that formed during the Eemian interglacial (about 125,000 years ago), when sea levels were higher than at present, are now emergent in places, and constitute the basement of the group's "central platform" islands, of which Pigeon Island is one.

== Flora ==
71 species of plant have been recorded on Pigeon Island, of which 45 are native and 29 introduced. These are:

- Acanthocarpus preissii
- Actites megalocarpa (dune thistle)
- Anagallis arvensis (pimpernel) (naturalised)
- Atriplex cinerea (grey saltbush)
- Atriplex paludosa (marsh saltbush)
- Atriplex sp.
- Austrostipa elegantissima
- Avena barbata (bearded oat) (naturalised)
- Brachyscome ciliaris
- Bromus arenarius (sand brome)
- Bromus diandrus (great brome) (naturalised)
- Bromus hordeaceus (soft brome) (naturalised)
- Bryophyllum delagoense (mother of millions) (naturalised)
- Bulbine semibarbata (leek lily)
- Capparis spinosa (coastal caper)
- Carpobrotus virescens (coastal pigface)
- Conyza bonariensis (flaxleaf fleabane) (naturalised)
- Cotyledon orbiculata
- Cynodon dactylon (couch) (naturalised)
- Daucus glochidiatus (Australian carrot)
- Dianella revoluta (blueberry lily)
- Diplolaena grandiflora (wild rose)
- Disphyma crassifolium subsp. clavellatum (round-leaved pigface)
- Ehrharta longiflora (annual veldt grass) (naturalised)
- Emex australis (doublegee) (naturalised)
- Enchylaena tomentosa (barrier saltbush)
- Eragrostis dielsii (mallee lovegrass)
- Erodium cicutarium (common storksbill) (naturalised)
- Erodium cygnorum (blue heronsbill)
- Euphorbia boophthona (Gascoyne spurge)
- Euphorbia tannensis
- Euphorbia terracina (Geraldton carnation weed) (naturalised)
- Exocarpos aphyllus (leafless ballart)
- Frankenia pauciflora (seaheath)
- Haloragis trigonocarpa
- Hordeum murinum subsp. leporinum (barley grass) (naturalised)
- Juncus bufonius (toad rush) (naturalised)
- Lactuca saligna (wild lettuce) (naturalised)
- Malva parviflora (marshmallow) (naturalised)
- Malva preissiana (Australian hollyhock)
- Medicago polymorpha (burr medic) (naturalised)
- Mesembryanthemum crystallinum (iceplant) (naturalised)
- Muellerolimon salicorniaceum
- Myoporum insulare (blueberry tree)
- Nicotiana glauca (tree tobacco) (naturalised)
- Nicotiana occidentalis subsp. hesperis (native tobacco)
- Nitraria billardierei (bitre bush)
- Olearia axillaris (coastal daisy bush)
- Phalaris minor (lesser canary grass) (naturalised)
- Pimelea microcephala (shrubby riceflower)
- Pittosporum phillyreoides (weeping pittosporum)
- Plantago debilis
- Polycarpon tetraphyllum (fourleaf allseed) (naturalised)
- Polypogon tenellus
- Rhagodia baccata (berry saltbush)
- Rhagodia latifolia
- Raphanus raphanistrum (wild radish) (naturalised)
- Rostraria cristata (naturalised)
- Sarcostemma viminale subsp. australe
- Schenkia australis (naturalised)
- Senecio pinnatifolius
- Setaria dielsii (Diels' pigeon grass)
- Solanum nigrum (black berry nightshade)
- Sonchus oleraceus (common sow thistle) (naturalised)
- Spergularia rubra (sand spurry) (naturalised)
- Sporobolus virginicus (marine couch)
- Tamarix aphylla (athel tree) (naturalised)
- Tecticornia arbuscula
- Tecticornia halocnemoides (shrubby samphire)
- Threlkeldia diffusa (coast bonefruit)
- Thysanotis patersonii
- Triglochin centrocarpa
- Vulpia myuros (rat's tail fescue) (naturalised)

== Fauna ==
The island's fauna includes the rare spiny-tailed skink, the Abrolhos painted button-quail and the brush bronzewing. The black rat (Rattus rattus) was previously present but has been eradicated.

== Human uses ==
The Houtman Abrolhos is wholly vested in Western Australia's Minister for Fisheries for purposes of "Conservation of Flora and Fauna, Tourism, and for Purposes Associated with the Fishing Industry". Pigeon Island is one of a small number of islands given over almost entirely to the last of these. As a result of guano mining in the 19th century, and the development of fishing infrastructure in the 20th century, the island has very little conservation value.

== See also ==
- List of islands of Australia
