= Shag Rock (Houtman Abrolhos) =

Island in Western Australia

- Interactive map of Shag Rock

Geography
- Location: Indian Ocean, off the coast of Western Australia
- Coordinates: 28°28′33″S 113°42′44″E
- Archipelago: Houtman Abrolhos
- Area: 0.1 ha (0.25 acres)
- Length: 50 m (160 ft)
- Width: 20 m (70 ft)
- Highest elevation: 3 m (10 ft)

Administration
- Australia
- State: Western Australia

Demographics
- Population: nil

Shag Rock is a small rocky island in the Wallabi Group of the Houtman Abrolhos.

== Geography ==
It is located at 28°28′33″S 113°42′44″E, about 1.5 km (1 mi) east of West Wallabi Island. Its nearest neighbour is Plover Island, about 700 m (2,297 ft) away. The island has an area of about 0.1 ha (0.25 acres), and a maximum elevation of 3 m (10 ft). It is uninhabited, and devoid of human infrastructure.

This island should not be confused with the rocky island that lies to the west of North Island. The latter has no gazetted name, but is informally known as "Shag Rock".

== Geology and physiography ==
Shag Rock is essentially an outcrop of Wallabi Limestone, a dense calcretised, coral limestone platform that underlies the entire Wallabi Group. This platform, which arises abruptly from a flat shelf, is about 40 m (131 ft) thick, and is of Quaternary origin. Reef that formed during the Eemian Stage (about 125,000 years ago), when sea levels were higher than at present, are now emergent in places, and constitute the basement of the group's "central platform" islands, of which Shag Island is one.

== Flora ==
About half of the island, including most of its centre, is rock with no vegetation cover. A very small area just south of the centre is vegetated by Tecticornia halocnemoides (Shrubby Samphire). The remainder of the island, predominantly the northern third and a patch in the south west, is vegetated by Atriplex cinerea (Grey Saltbush), Nitraria billardierei (Nitre Bush) and Pittosporum phillyreoides (Weeping Pittosporum).
