= Geelvink Channel =

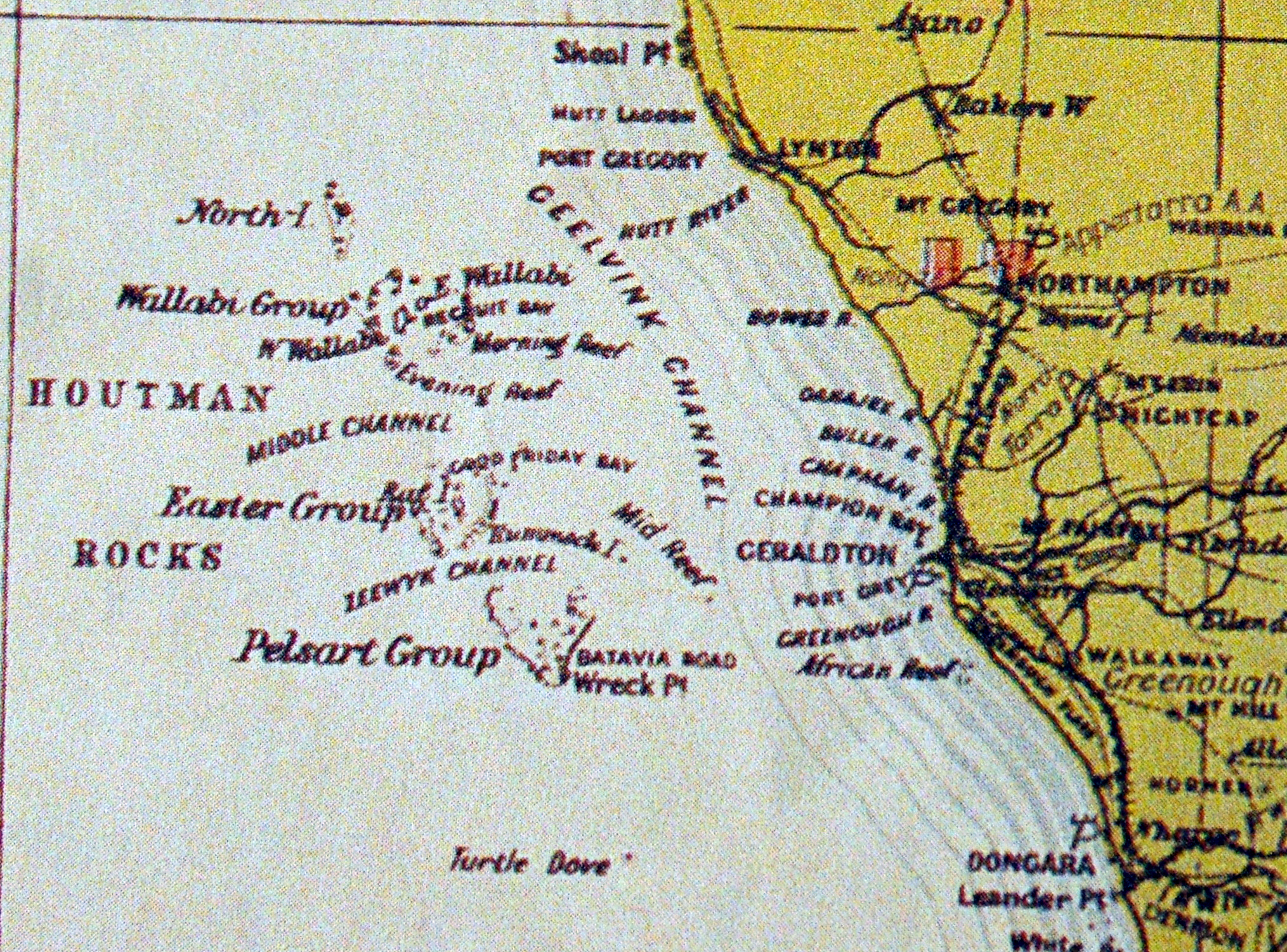
Geelvink Channel from map of 1897

Geelvink Channel is a feature to the east of the Houtman Abrolhos in the Indian Ocean off the coast of Western Australia, that lies between the Abrolhos and the port of Geraldton.

It is a feature that has whale movements and oil and gas exploration researched for effects of seismic exploration methods.

== Acute Bank ==
Acute Bank is a bank in the Geelvink Channel, east of South Passage in the Houtman Abrolhos. It is nominally located at 28°22′59″S 113°48′10″E.

== Charts ==
- Australian Hydrographic Service (2012), Houtman Abrolhos and Geelvink Channel, Australia - west coast, Western Australia (Ed. no. 2, 29 Jun. 2012 ed.), Australian Hydrographic Service
