= Record Hill =

Hill on North Island, Western Australia

Record Hill is located in the south-west corner of North Island.

Record Hill is the highest hill on North Island in the Houtman Abrolhos. It is located in the southwest of the island; its gazetted location is 28°18′19″S 113°35′29″E, but in fact it is located about 150 metres north of there at 28°18′15″S 113°35′29″E. It is about 13 metres (42 ft) high.

Record Island was discovered on 22 May 1840 by John Clements Wickham, Commander during the third voyage of HMS Beagle: "The highest hill on the south-west point, measuring 42 feet, received the name of Record Hill, from our leaving a paper in a bottle, giving an account of our cruise."
