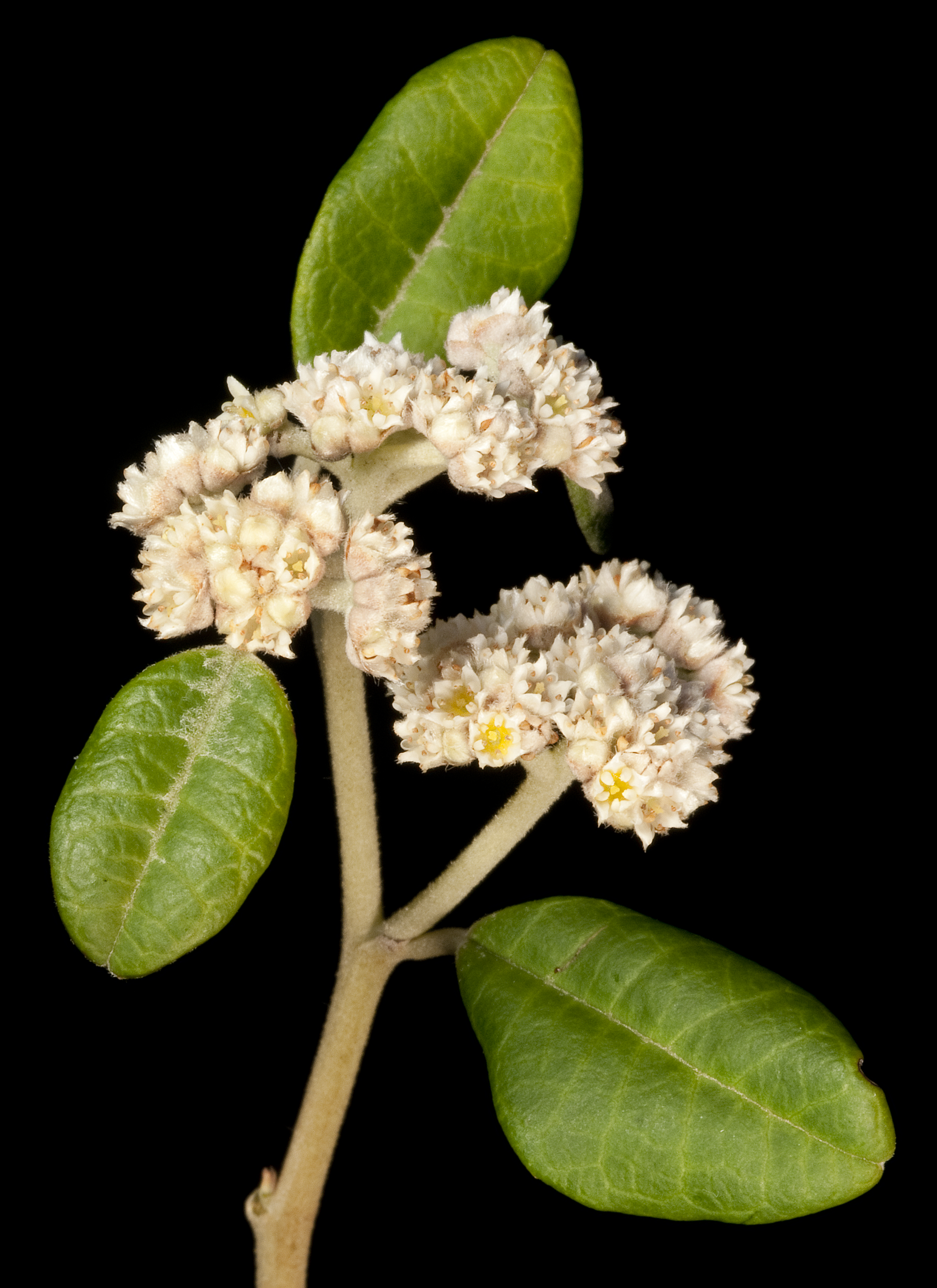

Scientific classification
- Kingdom: Plantae
- Clade: Tracheophytes
- Clade: Angiosperms
- Clade: Eudicots
- Clade: Rosids
- Order: Rosales
- Family: Rhamnaceae
- Genus: Spyridium
- Species: S. globulosum

Binomial name
- Spyridium globulosum (Labill.) Benth.

Synonyms
- List: Ceanothus globulosa Labill. orth. var.; Ceanothus globulosus Labill.; Cryptandra albicans (Steud.) F.Muell.; Cryptandra globulosa (Labill.) F.Muell.; Pomaderris aemula Steud.; Pomaderris albicans Steud.; Pomaderris globulosa (Labill.) G.Don; Pomaderris phillyraefolia Steud. orth. var.; Pomaderris phillyreifolia Fenzl; Pomaderris philyraefolia Fenzl orth. var.; Pomaderris phylirifolia A.D.Chapm. orth. var.; Pomaderris polyantha Steud.; Pomaderris pyrrophylla Steud.; Spyridium globulosum var. albicans (Steud.) Diels; Spyridium globulosum (Labill.) Benth. var. globulosum; Trymalium albicans (Steud.) Reissek; Trymalium globulosum (Labill.) Fenzl

= Spyridium globulosum =

Species of shrub

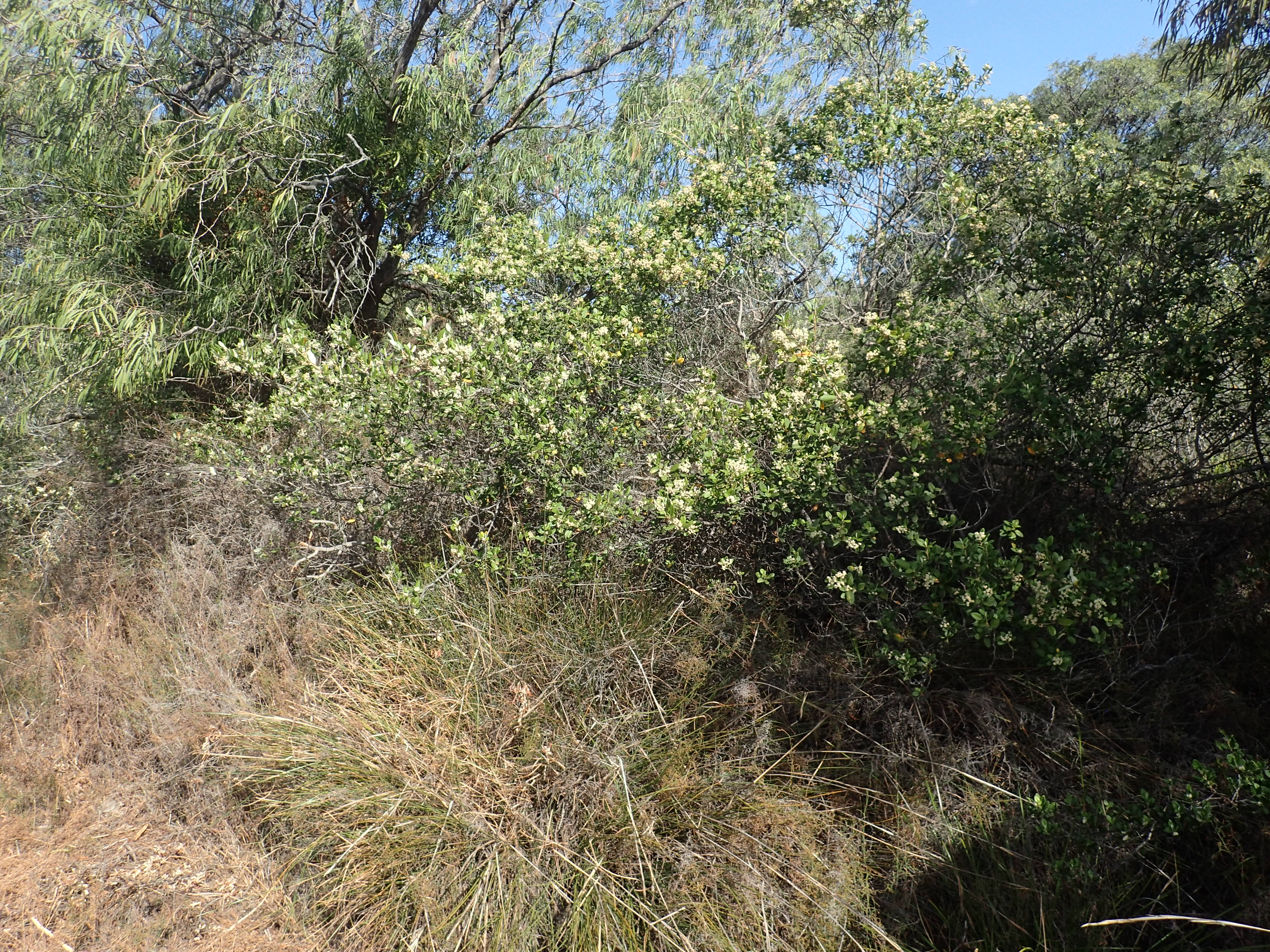
Habit near the Two Peoples Bay visitors centre

Spyridium globulosum, commonly known as basket bush, is a species of flowering plant in the family Rhamnaceae and is endemic to coastal areas in the south-west of Western Australia. It is a shrub with relatively large leaves and heads of flowers covered with whitish hairs.

== Description ==
Spyridium globulosum is an erect shrub that typically grows to a height of 0.6–5 m (2 ft 0 in – 16 ft 5 in), its young stems covered with short white or off-white hairs. The leaves are egg-shaped or oblong, 25–50 mm (0.98–1.97 in) long and 10–37 mm (0.39–1.46 in) wide, with small, thick stipules at the base. The leaves are mostly glabrous above but covered with grey, white or rust-coloured hairs on the lower surface. The heads of flowers are more or less spherical and arranged in dense cymes in leaf axils, the heads rarely longer than the leaves. The sepals are about 3 mm (0.12 in) long and joined at the base, forming a bell-shaped tube with softly-hairy bracts shorter than the sepals, at the base, the flowers covered with white hairs. Flowering occurs from June to November. Populations in the Perth area have leaves that are covered with white hairs on both surfaces.

== Taxonomy ==
Basket bush was first formally described in 1805 by Jacques Labillardière who gave it the name Ceanothus globulosus in his Novae Hollandiae Plantarum Specimen. In 1863, George Bentham changed the name to Spyridium globulosum. The specific epithet (globulosum) means "globe-shaped".

== Distribution and habitat ==
Spyridium globulosum grows on coastal sand dunes and on limestone in near-coastal areas in the Esperance Plains, Geraldton Sandplains, Hampton, Jarrah Forest, Mallee, Swan Coastal Plain and Warren bioregions of south-western Western Australia.
