= Western limestone ctenotus =

Conservation status
- Least Concern (IUCN 3.1)

Scientific classification
- Kingdom: Animalia
- Phylum: Chordata
- Class: Reptilia
- Order: Squamata
- Family: Scincidae
- Genus: Ctenotus
- Species: C. australis

Binomial name
- Ctenotus australis (Gray, 1838)

Synonyms
- Tiliqua australis Gray, 1838; Lygosoma lesueurii A.M.C. Duméril & Bibron, 1839; Lygosoma australe — Siebenrock, 1892; Ctenotus lesueuri — Storr, 1969; Ctenotus australis — Cogger, 1983; Minervascincus australis — Wells & Wellington, 1985; Ctenotus australis — Wilson & Swan, 2010

Species of lizard

The western limestone ctenotus (Ctenotus australis) is a species of lizard in the subfamily Sphenomorphinae of the family Scincidae. It is endemic to Western Australia.

== Geographic range ==
C. australis is native to coastal areas in the southwestern part of the Australian state of Western Australia.

== Habitat ==
C. australis is found amongst heath on coastal dunes, and in open woodland on the Swan Coastal Plain. It is generally restricted to areas with limestone.

== Description ==
The western limestone ctenotus is quite large for a ctenotus. It is a light brown colour, but over this is a complex, prominent pattern of black, white and brown stripes.

== Reproduction ==
C. australis is oviparous.
