= South Passage (Houtman Abrolhos) =

Strait in Australia

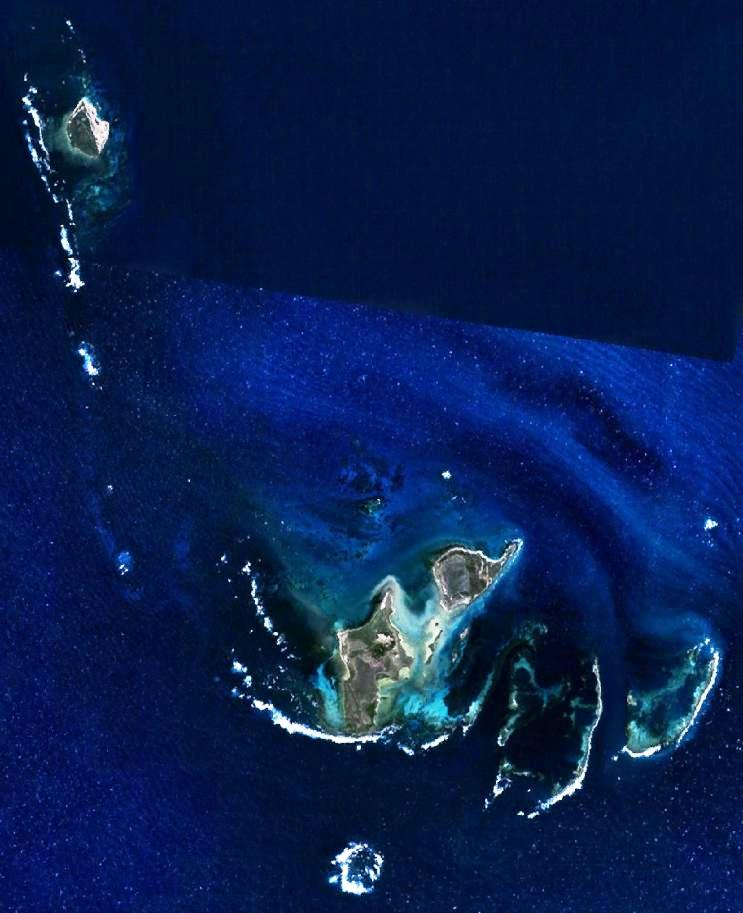

South Passage is a 14 kilometre (9 mi) wide strait that separates the outlying North Island from other islands in the Wallabi Group of the Houtman Abrolhos island chain, in the Indian Ocean off the coast of Western Australia. It is nominally located at 28°21′14″S 113°35′46″E.
