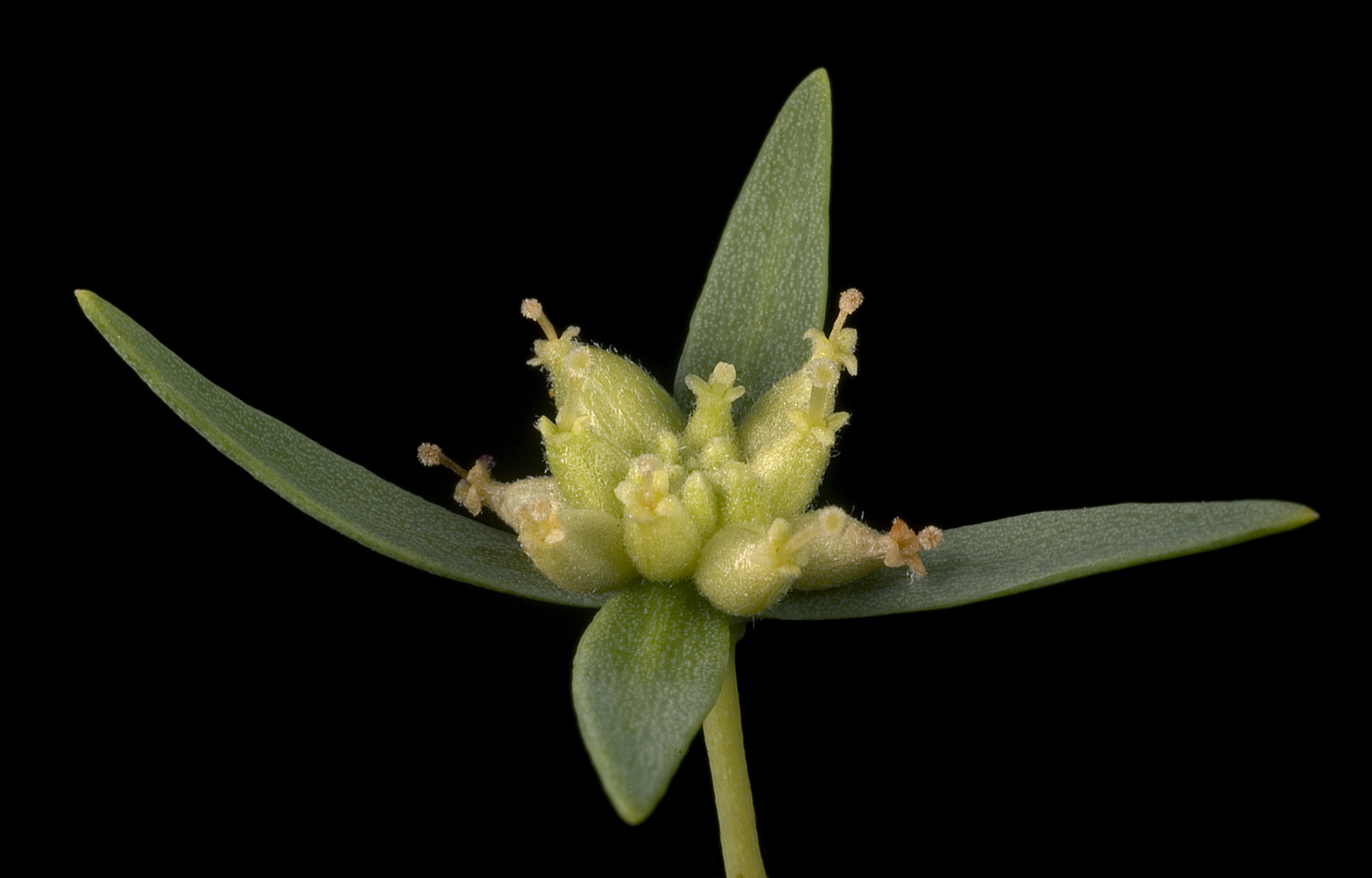
- Female flowers
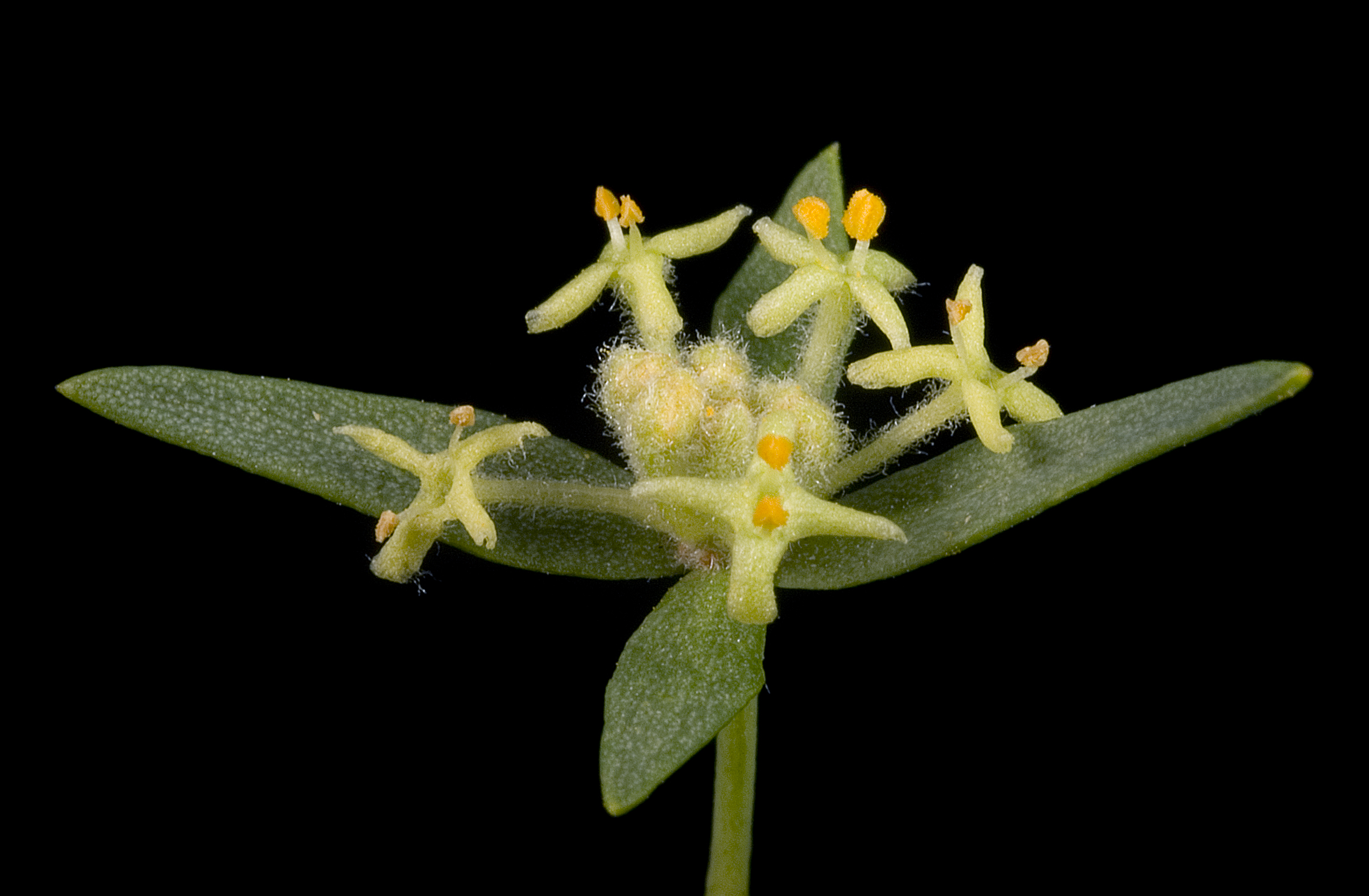
- Male flowers

Scientific classification
- Kingdom: Plantae
- Clade: Tracheophytes
- Clade: Angiosperms
- Clade: Eudicots
- Clade: Rosids
- Order: Malvales
- Family: Thymelaeaceae
- Genus: Pimelea
- Species: P. microcephala

Binomial name
- Pimelea microcephala R.Br.

Synonyms
- Aschenfeldtia pimeleoides Meisn. nom. inval., pro syn.; Aschenfeldtia pimeleoides Meisn. nom. inval., pro syn.; Banksia microcephala (R.Br.) Kuntze; Calyptrostegia microcephala (R.Br.) Endl.; ? Pimelea distinctissima F.Muell. nom. inval., nom. nud.

= Pimelea microcephala =

Species of plant

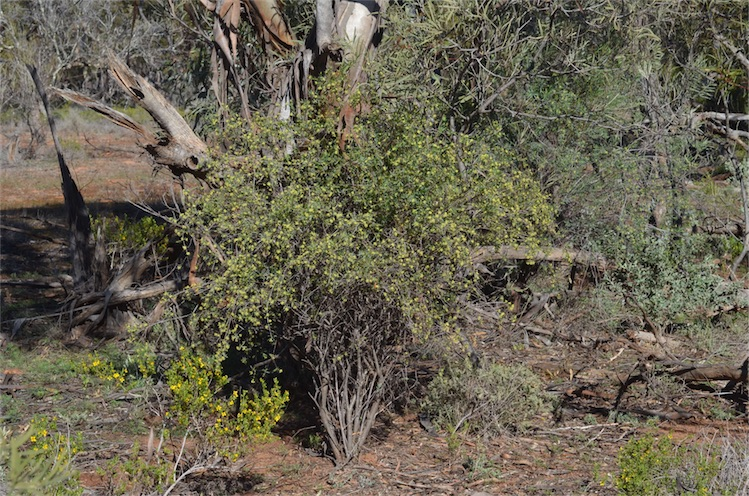
Habit of subsp. microcephala near the Gawler Ranges

Pimelea microcephala, commonly known as mallee rice-flower or shrubby rice-flower is a species of flowering plant in the family Thymelaeaceae and is endemic to mainland Australia. It is an erect shrub with compact heads of male or female, white to yellow or greenish flowers on separate plants, the heads surrounded by 2 or 4 leaf-like involucral bracts.

== Description ==
Pimelea microcephala is an erect, dioecious shrub that typically grows to a height of 0.7–4 m (2 ft 4 in – 13 ft 1 in) and has glabrous stems. Its leaves are arranged in opposite pairs, linear to more or less narrowly elliptic, mostly 7–40 mm (0.28–1.57 in) long and 1–4 mm (0.039–0.157 in) wide on a short petiole. The flowers are white to yellow or greenish and arranged on the ends of branches in compact heads on a peduncle 2–13 mm (0.079–0.512 in) long. The flowers are glabrous inside and usually densely curly-hairy on the outside, on a hairy pedicel. Male flowers are in heads of 8 to 100 flowers, the floral tube 3–7 mm (0.12–0.28 in) long. Female flowers are in heads of 7 to 12, each 2–4 mm (0.079–0.157 in) long. The sepals are 0.2–2 mm (0.0079–0.0787 in) long and the stamens of male flowers are shorter than the sepals. Flowering mainly occurs from April to September and the fruit is a succulent, red nut.

== Taxonomy ==
Pimelea microcephala was first formally described by Robert Brown in Prodromus Florae Novae Hollandiae in 1810.

In 1983 S. Threlfall described two subspecies of P. microcephala in the journal Brunonia, and the names are accepted by the Australian Plant Census:

- Pimelea microcephala subsp. glabra (F.Muell. & Tate ex J.M.Black) Threlfall (previously known as Pimelea microcephala var. glabra F.Muell. & Tate ex J.M.Black) has 8 to 64 male flowers, the floral tube 4–5 mm (0.16–0.20 in) long and the flowers sparsely hairy on the outside and often becoming glabrous.
- Pimelea microcephala R.Br. subsp. microcephala has 13 to 100 male flowers, the floral tube 3–8 mm (0.12–0.31 in) long and the flowers are covered with short, fine, curly hairs on the outside.

== Distribution and habitat ==
Mallee rice-flower grows in shrubland, woodland and mallee, and is widespread in all mainland states of Australia and in the Northern Territory. It is found in the north-west of Victoria, in inland New South Wales, in the south of the Northern Territory and in the Avon Wheatbelt, Carnarvon, Coolgardie, Gascoyne, Geraldton Sandplains, Great Victoria Desert, Mallee, Murchison Nullarbor, Pilbara and Yalgoo bioregions of Western Australia.

Subspecies glabra is restricted to the north-west of South Australia.
