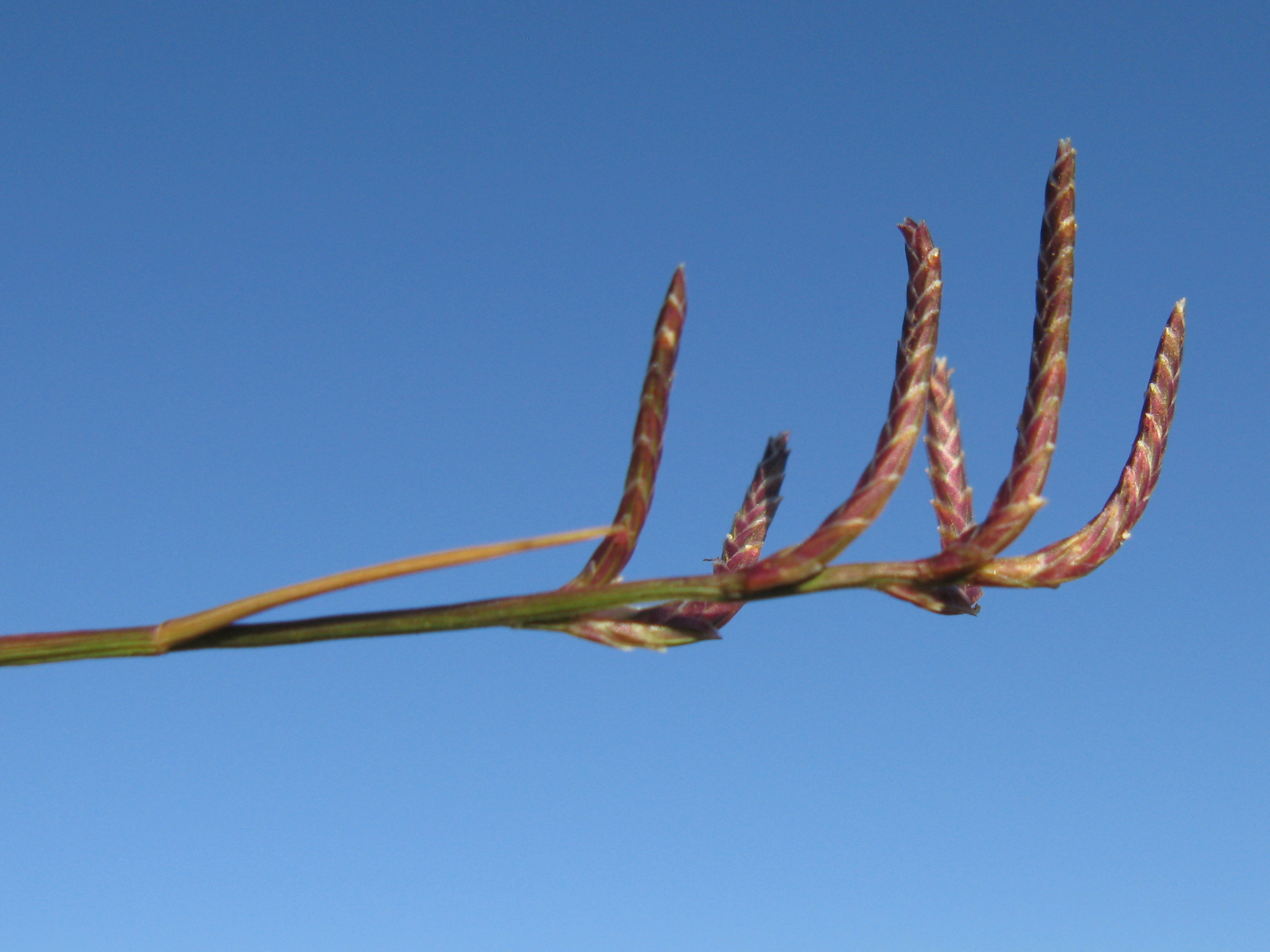

Scientific classification
- Kingdom: Plantae
- Clade: Tracheophytes
- Clade: Angiosperms
- Clade: Monocots
- Clade: Commelinids
- Order: Poales
- Family: Poaceae
- Subfamily: Chloridoideae
- Genus: Eragrostis
- Species: E. dielsii

Binomial name
- Eragrostis dielsii Pilg.

= Eragrostis dielsii =

Species of plant

Eragrostis dielsii, commonly known as mallee lovegrass, is a species of grass in the family Poaceae that is endemic to Australia.

== Description ==
It grows as an annual or short-lived perennial tuft up to 40 centimetres high with erect, spreading culms. Flowers are green and purple, and occur in panicles.

== Taxonomy ==
This species was first published in 1904 by Robert Knud Friedrich Pilger, based on specimens collected in the vicinity of Carnarvon, Western Australia. A number of varieties and forms have been published since then, but none are currently maintained.

== Distribution and habitat ==
It is widespread in Australia, occurring in every mainland state. It is often found in mallee vegetation. It favours light clay soils, but is also found growing in sands, loams, and limestone soils.
