= Wallabi Limestone =

Limestone platform off the coast of Western Australia

Wallabi Limestone is the name given to the dense calcretised, limestone platform that underlies the Wallabi Group of the Houtman Abrolhos, an archipelago off the coast of Western Australia. This platform, which arises abruptly from a flat shelf, is about 40 metres thick, and is of marine biogenic origin, having originated as a coral reef. It reached its maximum size during the Eemian Stage (about 125,000 years ago), when sea levels were higher than at present. The subsequent fall in sea level resulted in the reef becoming emergent in places, thus forming the basement of the group's "central platform" islands, namely West Wallabi Island, East Wallabi Island and North Island.

== See also ==
- List of types of limestone
