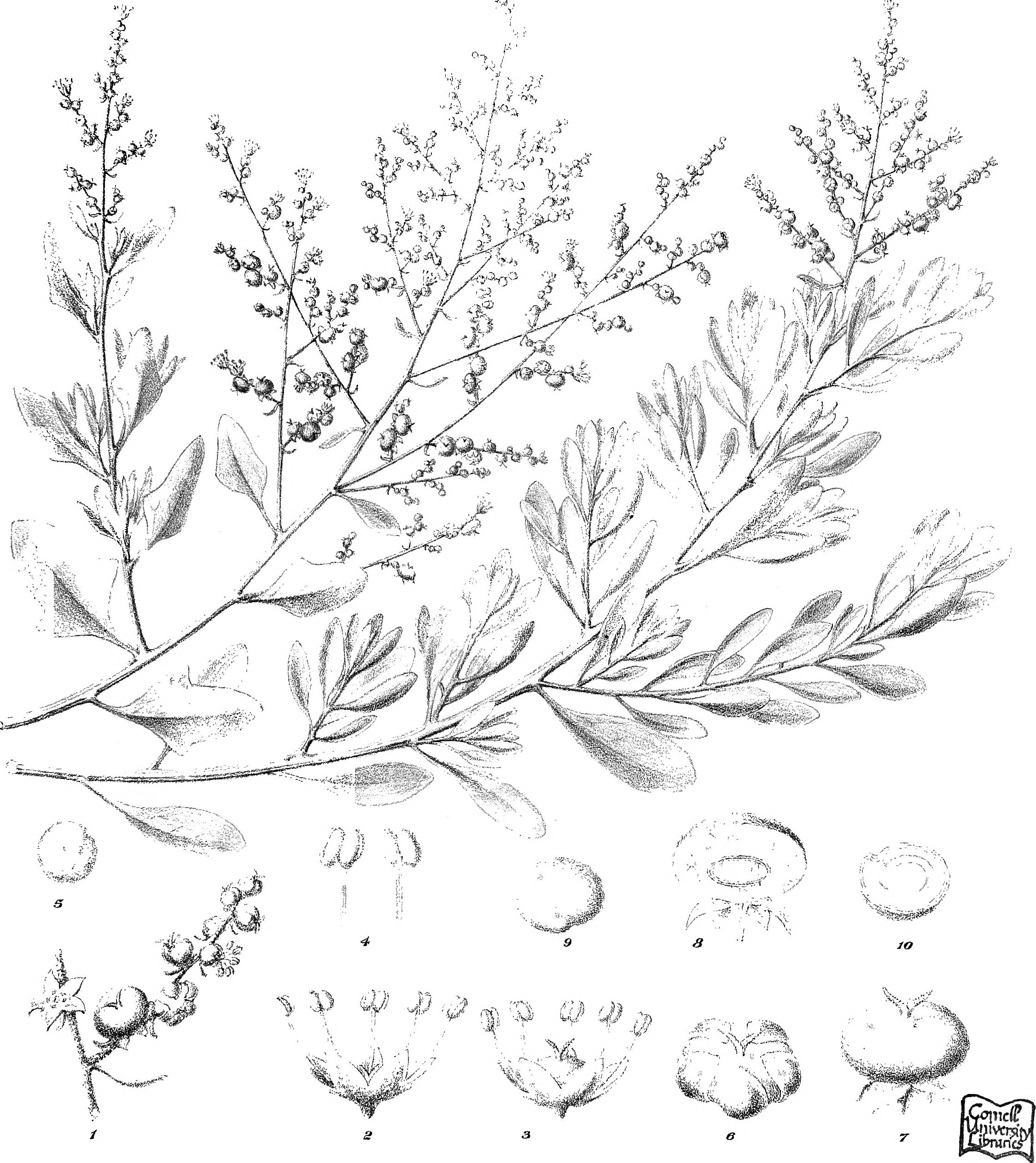

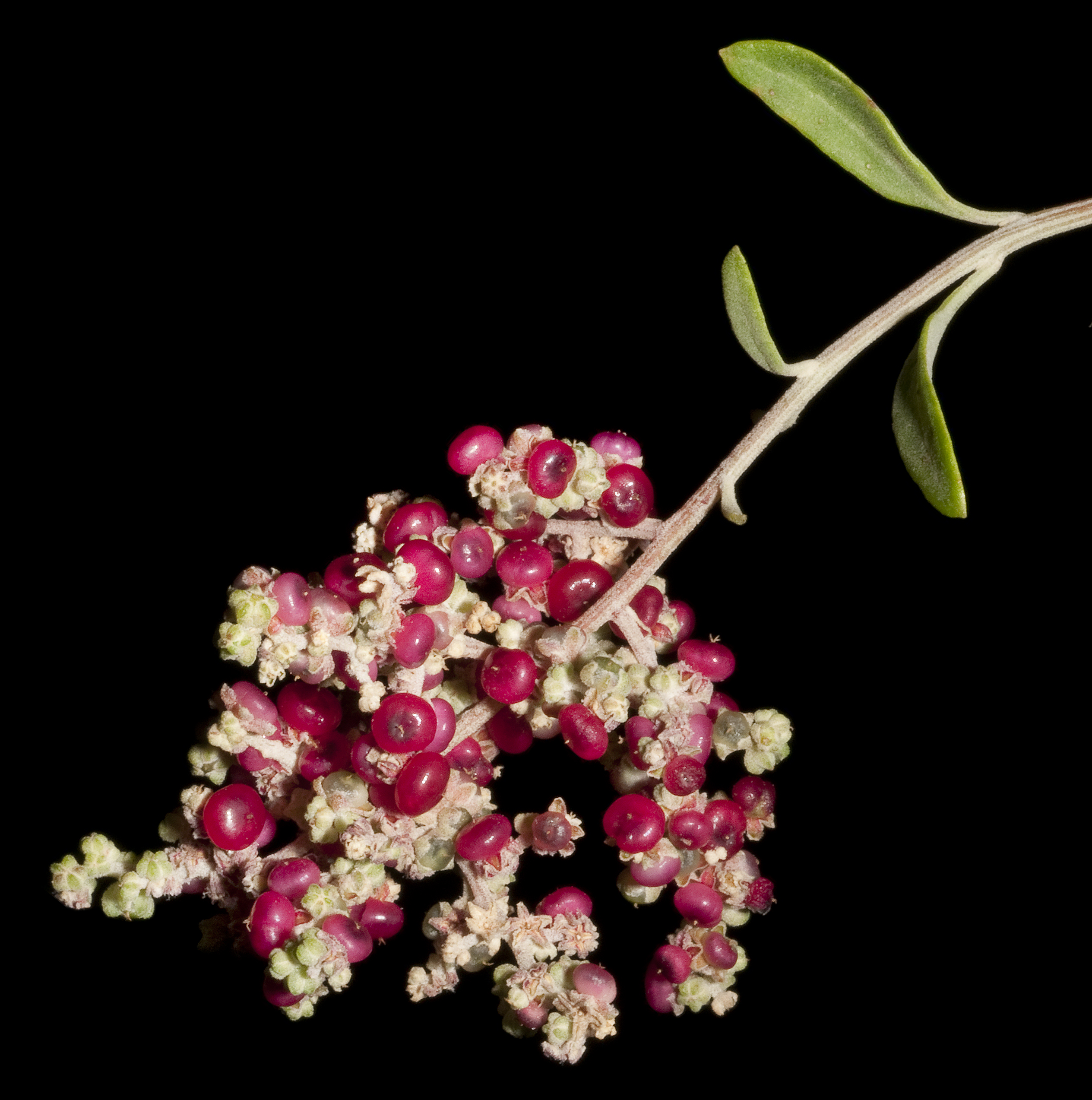

Scientific classification
- Kingdom: Plantae
- Clade: Tracheophytes
- Clade: Angiosperms
- Clade: Eudicots
- Order: Caryophyllales
- Family: Amaranthaceae
- Genus: Chenopodium
- Species: C. baccatum

Binomial name
- Chenopodium baccatum Labill.

Synonyms
- Rhagodia baccata (Labill.) Moq.

= Chenopodium baccatum =

Species of flowering plant

Chenopodium baccatum (Syn. Rhagodia baccata), commonly known as berry saltbush, is a species of shrub endemic to Western Australia.

== Description ==
It is a spreading shrub up to two metres high, with elliptical leaves, and flowers that occur in a panicle. It bears red berries.

== Taxonomy ==
It was first published in 1805 by Jacques Labillardière as Chenopodium baccatum. In 1810, Robert Brown transferred it into Rhagodia as Rhagodia billardierei, but this name was illegal, as there were no grounds for the specific epithet to be to overturned. In 1849, Alfred Moquin-Tandon transferred the species into Rhagodia as R. baccata, and this name remained current until 2012. After phylogenetic research, Fuentes-Bazan et al. (2012) included Rhagodia again in genus Chenopodium.

Two subspecies are currently recognised: the autonym Chenopodium baccatum subsp. baccatum, and Chenopodium baccatum subsp. dioicum (Nees) S.Fuentes & Borsch, (syn. Rhagodia dioica Nees) which was demoted from specific rank by Paul G. Wilson in 1983. These two subspecies intergrade in areas where they co-occur.

== Distribution and habitat ==
It mainly occurs along the coast of southwestern Western Australia, ranging from Geraldton, south to Cape Leeuwin, and east along the south coast as far as Cape Arid. There are also some outlying populations: it has been confirmed as occurring as far north as North West Cape, and well inland near Wiluna. It does, however, appear to be endemic to Western Australia; alleged collections of this plant from other states have now been shown to be specimens of the similar Rhagodia candolleana.
