= Chenopodium benthamii =

Scientific classification
- Kingdom: Plantae
- Clade: Tracheophytes
- Clade: Angiosperms
- Clade: Eudicots
- Order: Caryophyllales
- Family: Amaranthaceae
- Genus: Chenopodium
- Species: C. benthamii

Binomial name
- Chenopodium benthamii Iamonico & Mosyakin

Synonyms
- Rhagodia latifolia (Benth.) Paul G. Wilson; Rhagodia crassifolia var. latifolia Benth.

Species of flowering plant

Chenopodium benthamii (Syn. Rhagodia latifolia) is a species of shrub endemic to midwest Western Australia.

== Description ==
It grows as a shrub from 40 centimetres to two metres high, leathery, elliptical leaves, and panicles of green flowers.

== Taxonomy ==
It was first published as a variety of Rhagodia crassifolia by George Bentham in 1870, based on a specimen collected from Dirk Hartog Island by Allan Cunningham. In 1983 Paul G. Wilson promoted it to specific rank. After phylogenetical research, Fuentes-Bazan et al. (2012) included this species in genus Chenopodium as Chenopodium latifolium. but this name was a later homonym and thus illegitimate. In 2017, Iamonico & Mosyakin replaced it by the name Chenopodium benthamii, in honour of George Bentham.

Two subspecies are currently recognised: the autonym Chenopodium benthamii subsp. benthamii, and Chenopodium benthamii subsp. rectum (Paul G. Wilson) Iamonico & Mosyakin, which was published by Wilson in 1983.

== Distribution and habitat ==
It occurs on coastal sand dunes and limestone cliff in midwest Western Australia, ranging from Geraldton north to the Murchison River.
