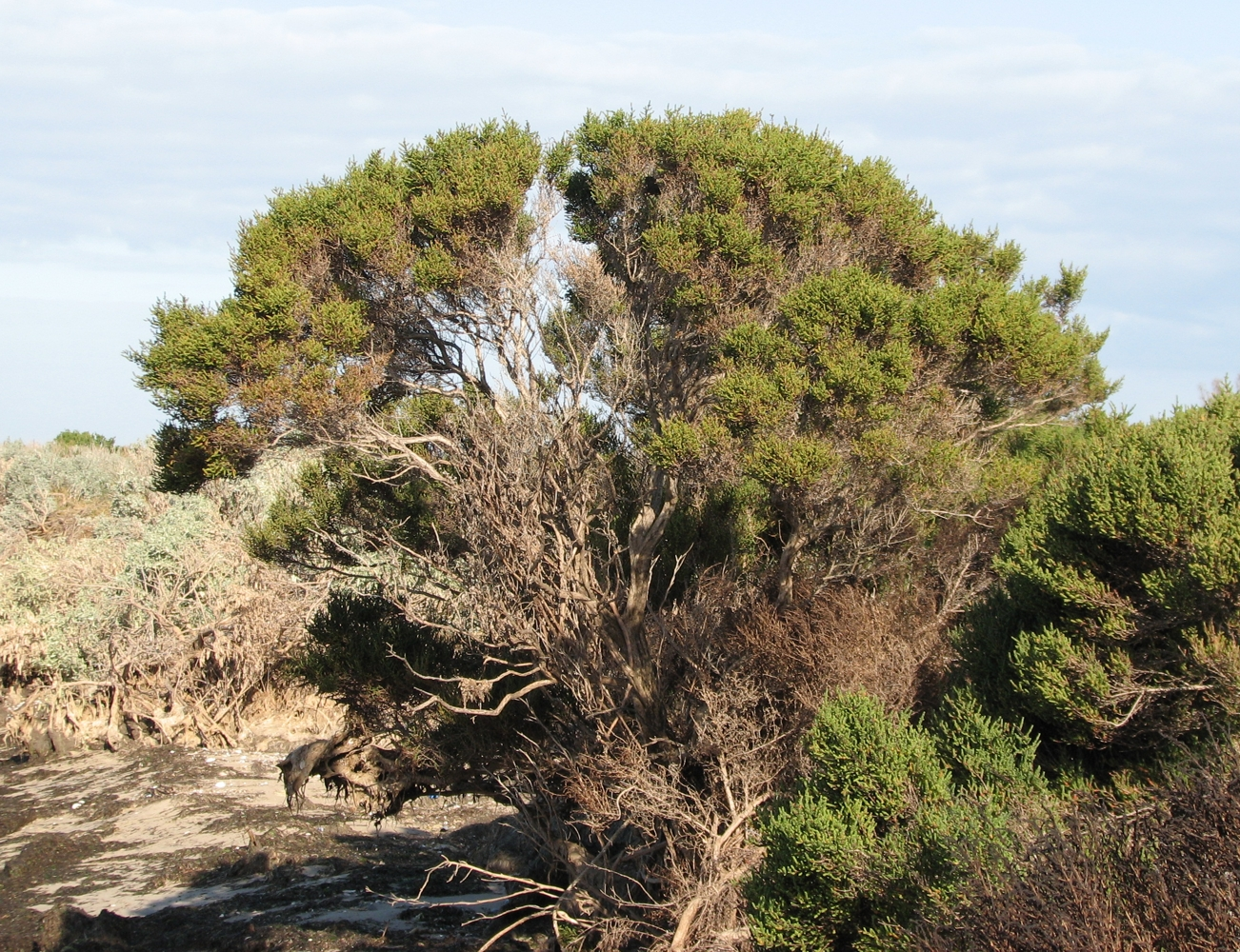

Scientific classification
- Kingdom: Plantae
- Clade: Tracheophytes
- Clade: Angiosperms
- Clade: Eudicots
- Order: Caryophyllales
- Family: Amaranthaceae
- Genus: Tecticornia
- Species: T. arbuscula

Binomial name
- Tecticornia arbuscula (R.Br.) K.A.Sheph. & Paul G.Wilson

Synonyms
- Salicornia arbuscula R.Br.; Arthrocnemum arbuscula (R. Br.) Moq.; Sclerostegia arbuscula (R.Br.) Paul G.Wilson

= Tecticornia arbuscula =

Shrubby glasswort

Species of plant

Tecticornia arbuscula, the shrubby glasswort or scrubby samphire, is a species of plant in the family Amaranthaceae, native to Australia. It is a shrub that grows to 2 metres in height, with a spreading habit. It has succulent swollen branchlets with small leaf lobes.

The species occurs on shorelines in coastal or estuarine areas or in salt marshes, especially marshes subject to occasional inundation by the ocean. It has a patchy distribution across south coastal Australia, occurring in southern Western Australia, South Australia, Victoria, New South Wales and Tasmania.

Seeds of the species are enclosed in a hard, vaguely pyramid-shaped pericarp which reveal 1.5 mm long, narrow seeds. these seeds appear as golden brown, transparent and unornamented.

Originally published by Robert Brown under the name Salicornia arbuscula, it was transferred into Sclerostegia by Paul G. Wilson in 1980, before being merged into Tecticornia in 2007.
