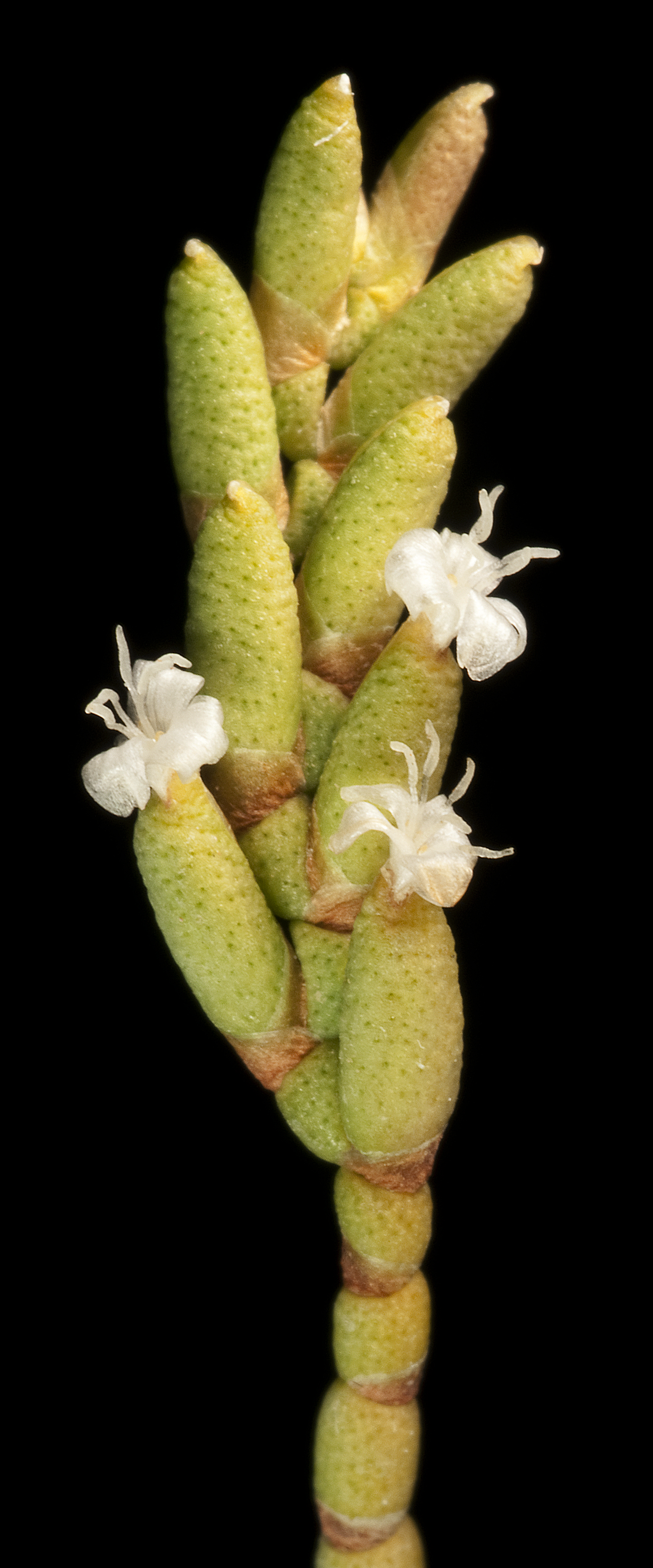

Scientific classification
- Kingdom: Plantae
- Clade: Tracheophytes
- Clade: Angiosperms
- Clade: Eudicots
- Order: Caryophyllales
- Family: Plumbaginaceae
- Genus: Muellerolimon; Lincz.
- Species: M. salicorniaceum

Binomial name
- Muellerolimon salicorniaceum (F.Muell.) Lincz.

Synonyms
- Goniolimon salicorniaceum (F.Muell.) Christenh. & Byng; Limonium salicorneacea (F.Muell.) Kuntze; Statice salicorneacea F.Muell.

= Muellerolimon =

Species of Australian herb or shrub

Muellerolimon salicorniaceum, the sole species in genus Muellerolimon, is a succulent perennial herb or shrub that grows on salt mudflats in Western Australia.

== Description ==
It grows as an erect or spreading succulent perennial herb or shrub, from ten centimetres to a metre high (3.9 in to 3 ft 3 in). Its leaves are reduced to tiny scales sheathing the stem joints. Flowers are white, and occur in terminal cymes. The fruit is a nut.

== Taxonomy ==
The species was first published in 1881 by Ferdinand von Mueller, under the name Statice salicorneacea. It was transferred into Limonium by Otto Kuntze in the 1890s, where it remained until 1982, when Igorj Alexandrovich Linczevski erected Muellerolimon for it.

== Distribution and habitat ==
It grows in coastal mudflats and salt marches of Western Australia. Most specimen collections have been near the coast between Geraldton and Broome, but there have also been collections from the west coast south of Perth, the south coast in the vicinity of Esperance, and as far inland as Wiluna.

== Ecology ==
It is halophytic. It is not considered threatened.
