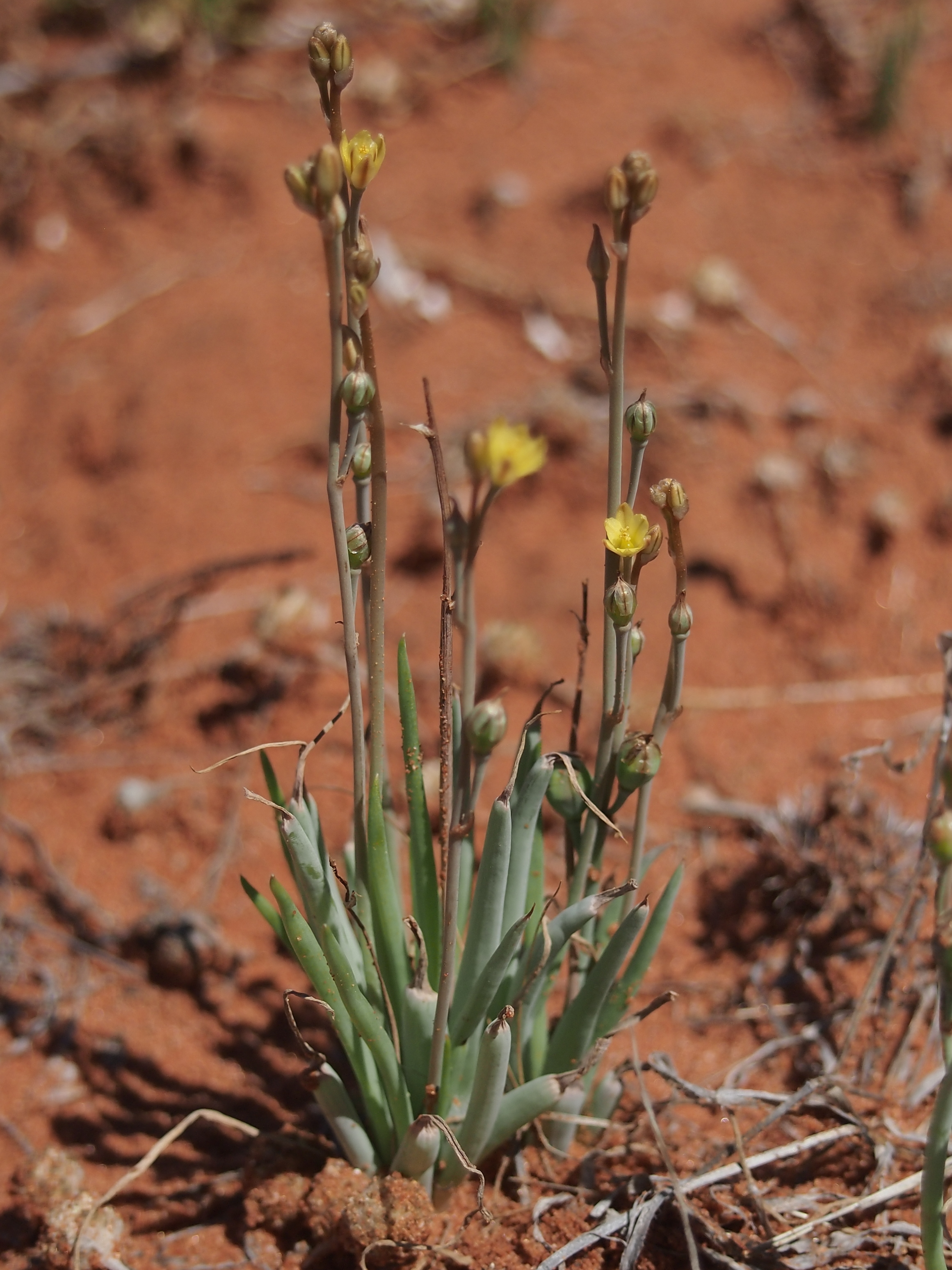

Scientific classification
- Kingdom: Plantae
- Clade: Tracheophytes
- Clade: Angiosperms
- Clade: Monocots
- Order: Asparagales
- Family: Asphodelaceae
- Subfamily: Asphodeloideae
- Genus: Bulbine
- Species: B. semibarbata

Binomial name
- Bulbine semibarbata (R.Br.) Haw.

= Bulbine semibarbata =

Species of plant

Bulbine semibarbata, commonly known as leek lily, native leek or wild onion, is a species of annual herb native to Australia.

== Description ==
It grows as an annual herb from 7 to 45 centimetres high, with yellow flowers.

== Taxonomy ==
It was first published by Robert Brown in his 1810 Prodromus florae Novae Hollandiae, under the name Anthericum semibarbatum. Eleven years later, Adrian Hardy Haworth transferred it into Bulbine.

== Distribution and habitat ==
It is widespread in Australia, occurring in every state and the Northern Territory. It prefers white or grey sand, sandy clay, or loam, and favours areas that are wet in winter, such as granite outcrops, creek lines, the margins of salt lakes and along the coast.
