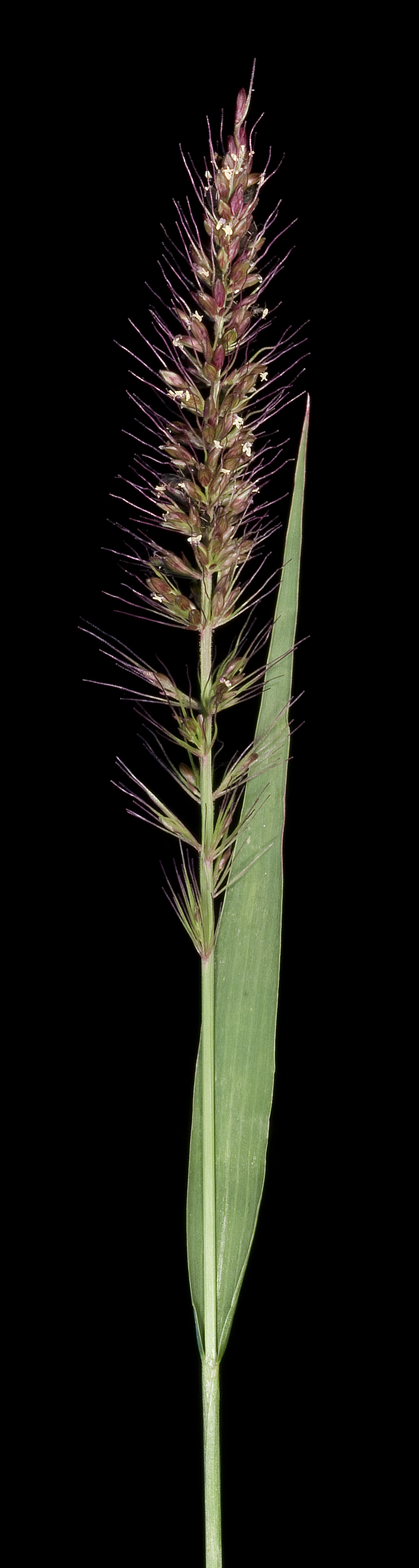

Scientific classification
- Kingdom: Plantae
- Clade: Tracheophytes
- Clade: Angiosperms
- Clade: Monocots
- Clade: Commelinids
- Order: Poales
- Family: Poaceae
- Subfamily: Panicoideae
- Genus: Setaria
- Species: S. dielsii

Binomial name
- Setaria dielsii R.A.W.Herrm.

Synonyms
- Setaria buchananii Hitchc.

= Setaria dielsii =

Species of grass

Setaria dielsii, commonly known as Diels' pigeon grass, is a species of grass in the family Poaceae native to Australia.

== Description ==
It is an annual grass that grows in tufts from 20 to 130 centimetres high. It has green flowers that occur in an open panicle.

== Taxonomy ==
This species was first published by Rudolf Albert Wolfgang Herrmann in 1910. Its only synonym is Setaria buchananii, published by Albert Spear Hitchcock in 1927.

== Distribution and habitat ==
It occurs in Western Australia and the Northern Territory.
