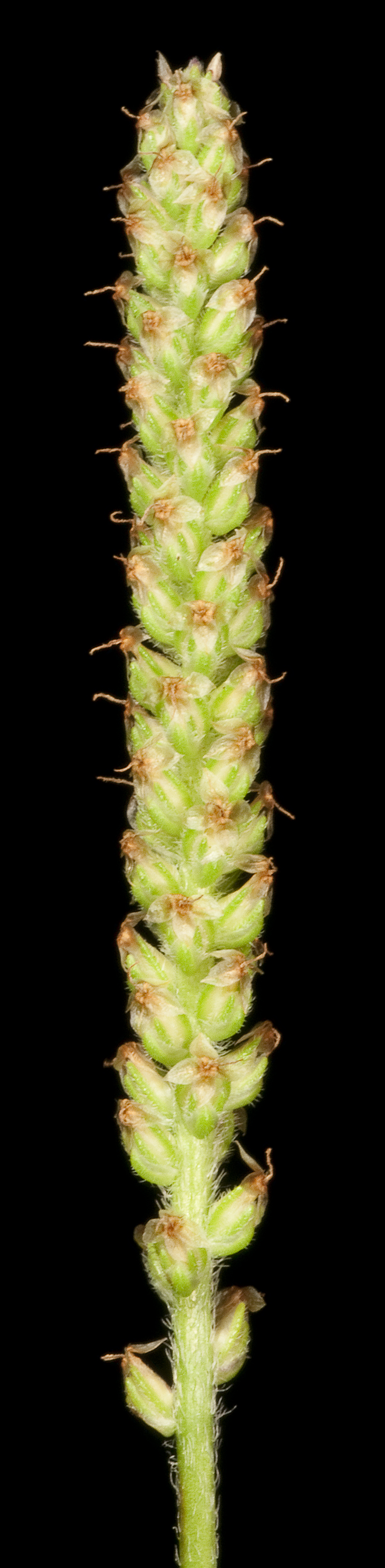

Scientific classification
- Kingdom: Plantae
- Clade: Embryophytes
- Clade: Tracheophytes
- Clade: Angiosperms
- Clade: Eudicots
- Clade: Asterids
- Order: Lamiales
- Family: Plantaginaceae
- Genus: Plantago
- Species: P. debilis

Binomial name
- Plantago debilis R.Br.

= Plantago debilis =

Species of flowering plant in the plantain family

Plantago debilis is a species of herb native to Australia. Common names include shade plantain and weak plantain.

== Description ==
It grows as an annual or perennial herb up to 20 centimetres (7.9 in) high, with green or white flowers and a slender taproot.

== Taxonomy ==
This species was first published by Robert Brown in his 1810 Prodromus florae Novae Hollandiae. In 1916 Joseph Maiden and Ernst Betche demoted it to a variety of P. varia, but this was not accepted.

Two varieties have been published, but it is unclear whether they are still recognised. P. debilis var. parvifolia was published as P. varia var. parvifolia by George Bentham in 1870. In 1937 Robert Pilger transferred it to P. debilis, thus implicitly publishing the autonym P. debilis var. debilis. The specific epithet, debilis, is a Latin adjective, L. debilis,-is,-e, meaning "weak", "feeble", "frail".

== Distribution and habitat ==
It is native to Australia, occurring in every state and territory. It favours moist sandy soils.

== Aboriginal uses ==
The Noongar people of south west Western Australia heated and crushed the leaves to give a liquid that was used to make poultices for sprains, ulcers, and boils.

== External list ==
- Plantago debilis occurrence data from Australasian Virtual Herbarium
