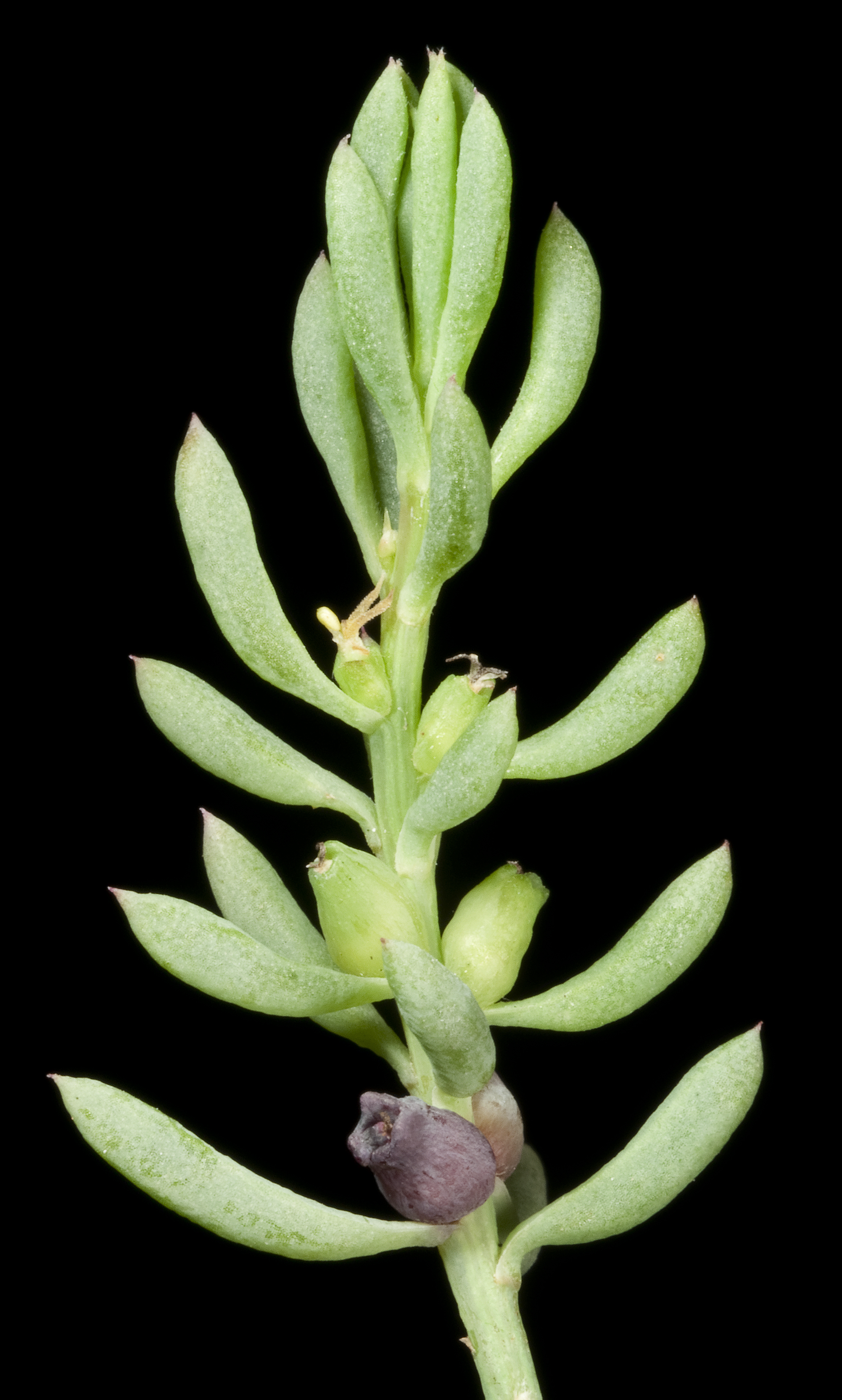

Scientific classification
- Kingdom: Plantae
- Clade: Tracheophytes
- Clade: Angiosperms
- Clade: Eudicots
- Order: Caryophyllales
- Family: Amaranthaceae
- Genus: Threlkeldia
- Species: T. diffusa

Binomial name
- Threlkeldia diffusa R.Br.

= Threlkeldia diffusa =

Coast bonefruit

Species of plant

Threlkeldia diffusa, also known as coast bonefruit, is a perennial herb which occurs in coastal areas and saline flats in Australia. It is sometimes prostrate or may grow up to 0.4 metres in height. The green flowers occur between October and November (spring) in its native range.
