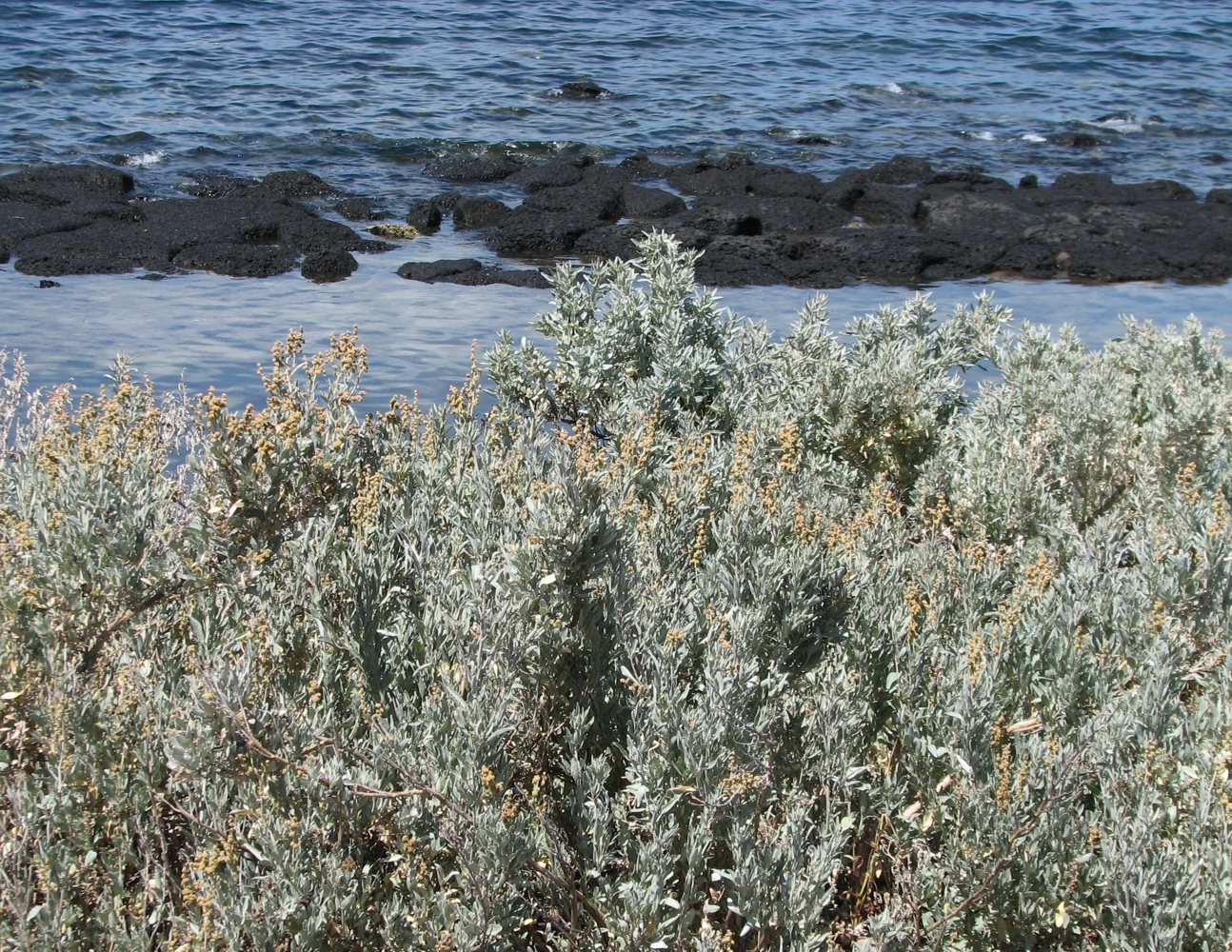
- Williamstown, Victoria
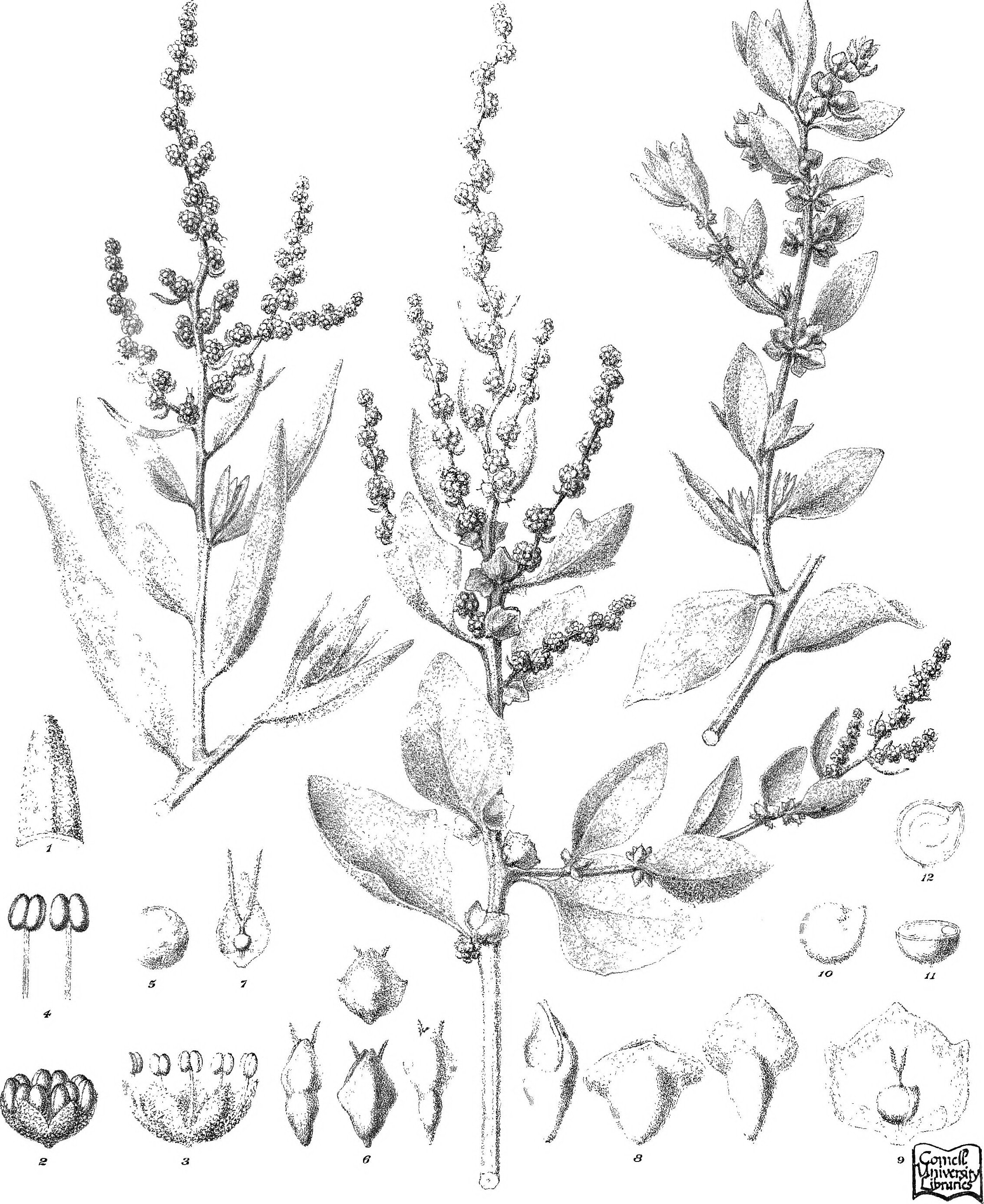
- From Mueller 1889

Conservation status
- Nationally Critical (NZ TCS)

Scientific classification
- Kingdom: Plantae
- Clade: Tracheophytes
- Clade: Angiosperms
- Clade: Eudicots
- Order: Caryophyllales
- Family: Amaranthaceae
- Genus: Atriplex
- Species: A. cinerea

Binomial name
- Atriplex cinerea Poir.
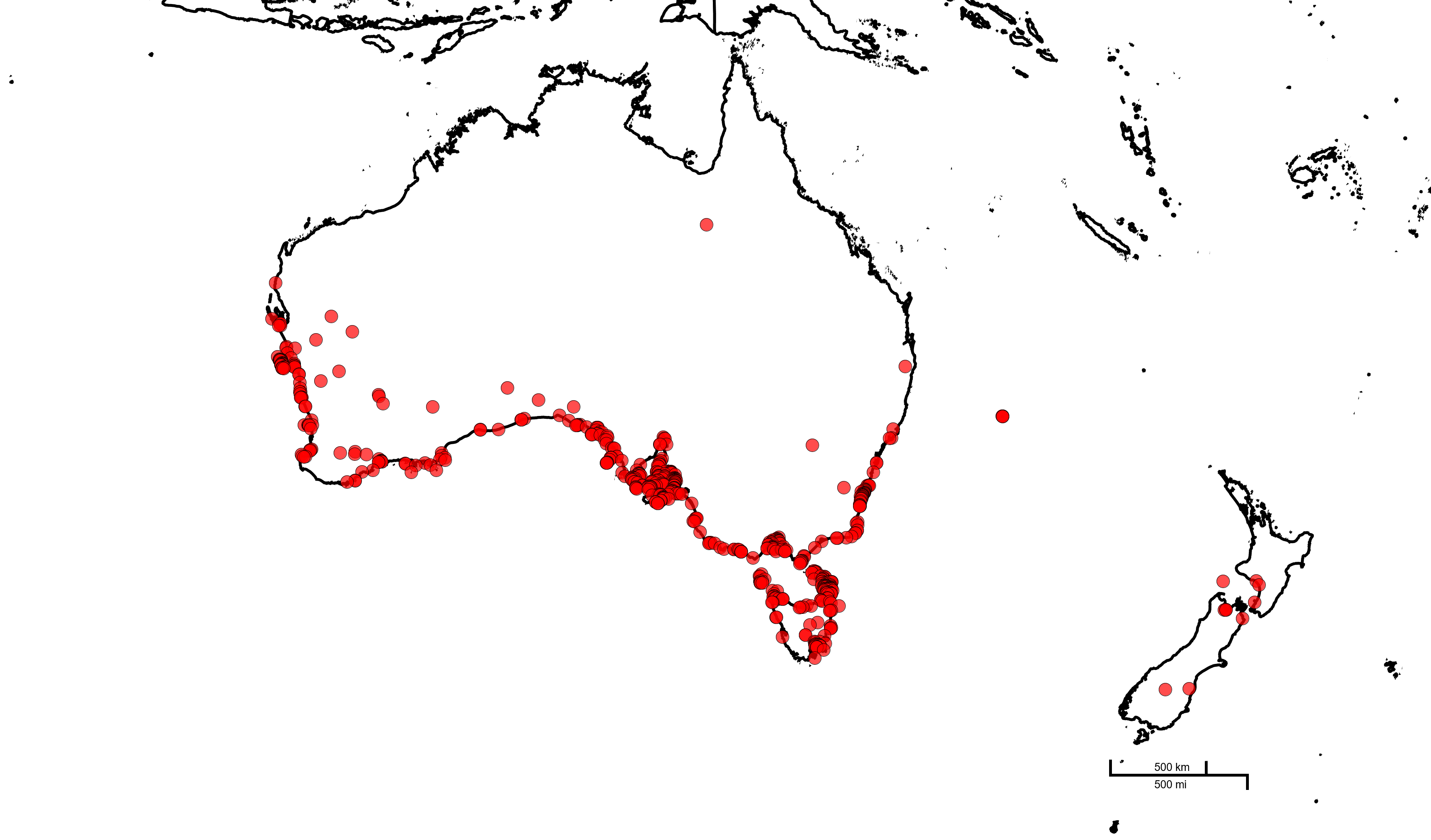
- Occurrence data ALA

= Atriplex cinerea =

Species of plant

Atriplex cinerea, commonly known as grey saltbush, coast saltbush, barilla or truganini, is a plant species in the family Amaranthaceae. It occurs in sheltered coastal areas and around salt lakes in the Australian states of Western Australia, South Australia, Tasmania, Victoria and New South Wales. The species is also known to be present in the Waimea inlet in New Zealand, although has historically been found in Boulder Bank, D'Urville Island, and Palliser Bay.

The Latin specific name cinerea means "ashy". Atriplex cinerea has a chromosome number 2n=54, indicating the species is hexaploid as the base number in Atriplex is 9.

== Description ==
Atriplex cinerea is a prostrate to erect, heavily branched, leafy shrub growing up to 1.8m high and up to 2.5 m wide. Stems are initially ridged and angular, becoming woody with age. The leaves are elliptic to oblong. 40 mm long, 15 mm wide. Petioles are 1–3 mm. Leaves alternate and are silver or grey-green in colour. The plant is covered with bladderlike hairs. The species is monoecious or dioecious. The male flowers in purple globular clusters (but look yellow when in bloom) and are on simple or branched spikes. The unbranched florets are attached to the stem. The male flower lacks bracts or bracteoles. The female plant also flowers, but more discretely in the leaf axil, (appearing as two small pink tepals in image below). Perianth is absent. Bracteoles 2mm diameter. Flowers from September until March. Fruits from October until January.

Flowers of Atriplex cinerea
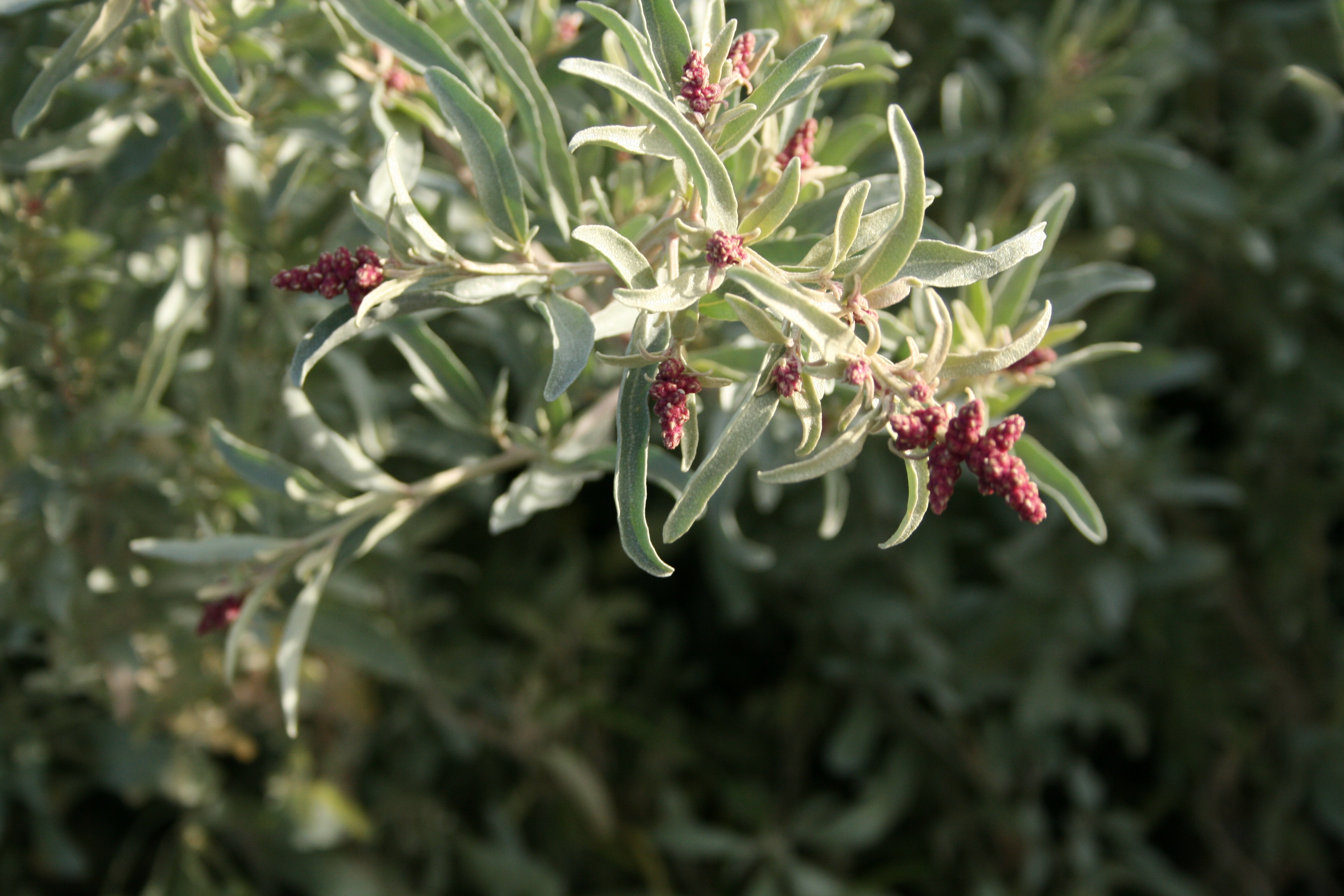
The purple globular clusters of the male flower.

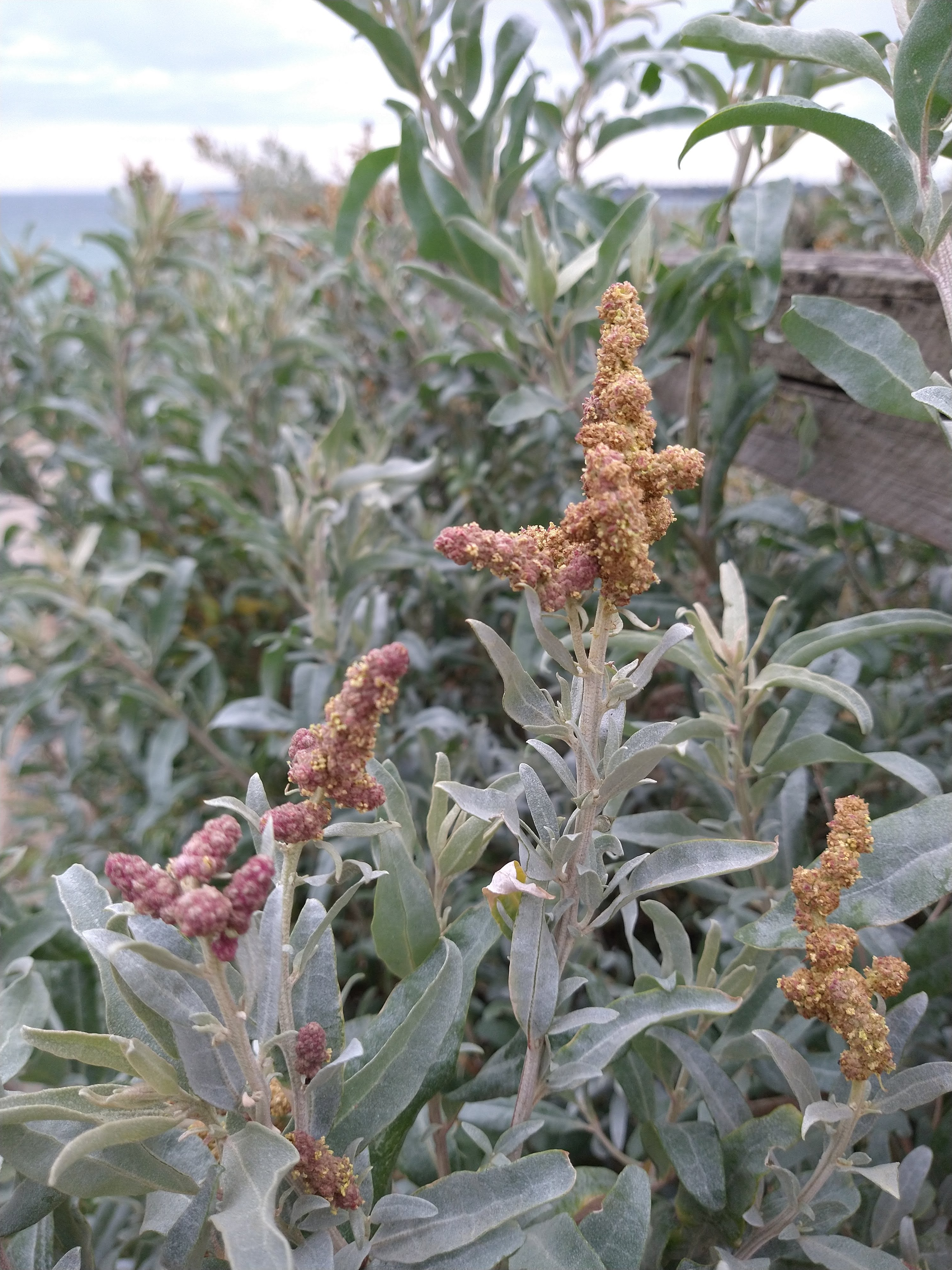
The male flower during anthesis.

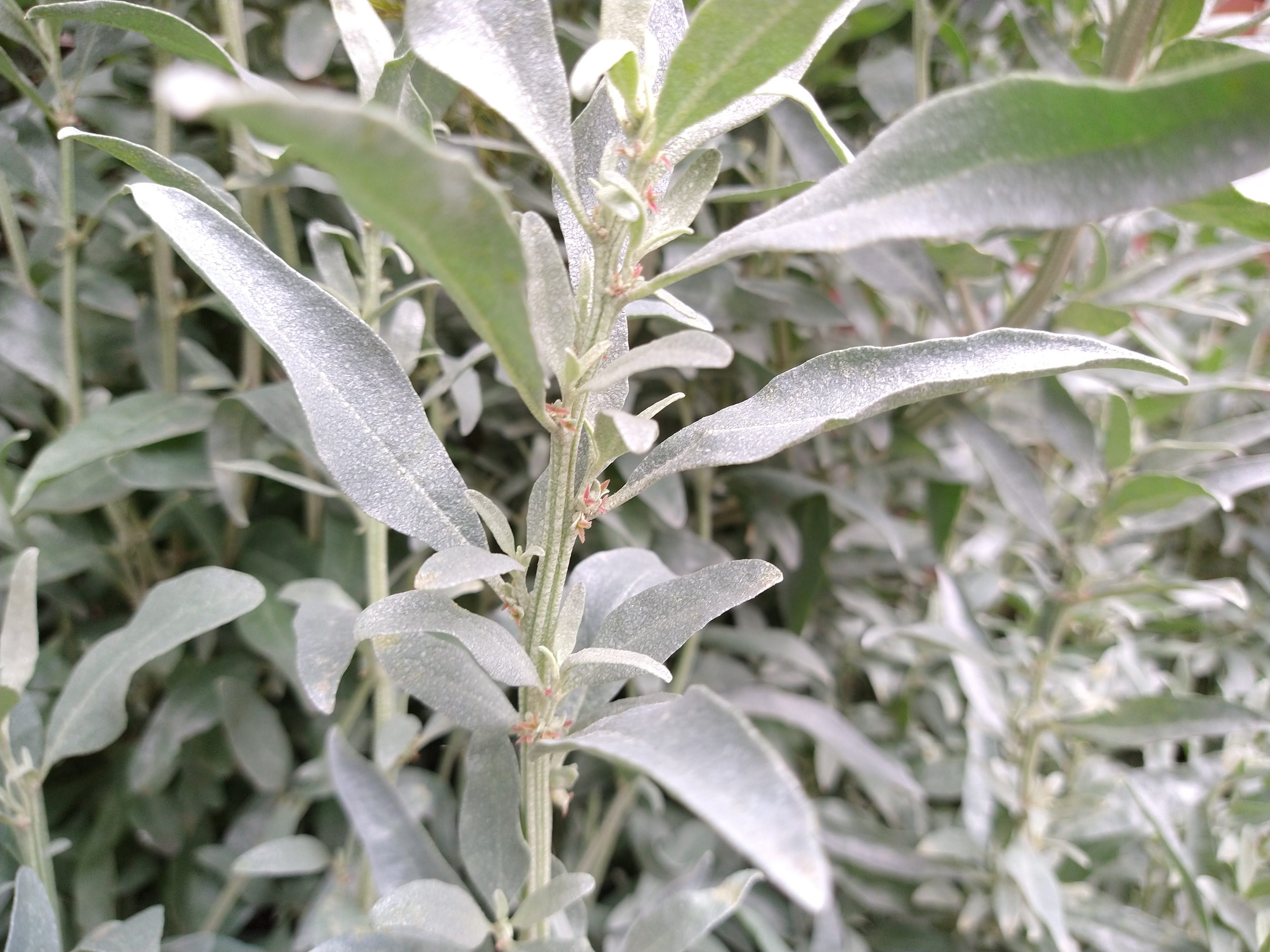
The discrete female flower in the leaf axil.

== Habitat ==
Atriplex cinerea thrives in coastal environments. It is considered native to Victoria but naturalised in some parts of the state. It is highly tolerant of salt (being a halophyte) and when compared to other coastal species, e.g. Banksia integrifolia, Leptospermum laevigatum, Melaleuca lanceolata, this plant is often located closest to the sea, in the harshest of conditions. It is able to colonise sand dunes despite the prevailing winds and sea spray. The soils on which it grows are nutrient poor and can be highly alkaline (where sand is composed of calcium carbonate). Survival in this environment is possible due to numerous adaptations, including epidermal bladder cells that can sequester the salt from vascular tissue/their interior, and C4 photosynthesis, present in many species of the genus Atriplex.

== Distribution ==
The distribution is highly coastal. As a result, > 95% of recorded occurrences in Australia are on the coast (according to Atlas of Living Australia). It is found in Western Australia, South Australia, Victoria, Tasmania and New South Wales. Established on coastal sandy soils, specifically preferring bays and inlets such as Western Port Bay and Port Phillip Bay. The natural range and density of this species has decreased as major cities (Melbourne/Sydney/Adelaide) and subsequent suburbs have expanded along the coast of Australia. The distribution extends to the Bass Strait Islands and Tasmanian coastline. The presence of A. cinerea on these islands may suggest this species had a wider distribution in times of lower sea levels.

It can also be found further abroad in Lord Howe Island (although described as having a "very restricted distribution") and in New Zealand. In the past, A. cinerea had been considered an adventive species to New Zealand. However a more recent study provided evidence, and accepted A. cinerea as a vagrant species indigenous to New Zealand. Evidence provided included the movement of fruits by near-shore currents as the most likely method of seed dispersal. Bracteoles of A. cinerea float in salt water for periods of 18–30 days. Further the seeds that were washed in fresh water after previously being immersed in salt water germinated more easily than seeds not subject to salt water immersion. The study concluded that "A. cinerea has always been scarce, its ability to successfully establish here has been hindered by its dioecious habit... its scarcity within New Zealand is primarily a natural rather than induced phenomenon."

== Uses ==
Atriplex cinerea is often used by humans/local councils to help stabilise soils, prevent erosion and revegetate/rehabilitate at risk areas. The genus Atriplex is particularly useful in dryland salinity management where they can change the water table and surface soil characteristics allowing for other plants to then colonise.

Joseph Maiden's 1889 book The Useful Native Plants of Australia records that it was "once used as pot-herb in New South Wales. During his overland journey to Port Essington, Leichhardt used a species of Atriplex as a vegetable, and spoke very highly of it."

Studies conducted on other Atriplex species demonstrated their potential use in agriculture. A study on Atriplex nummularia discovered the species have a nitrogen content of 2.5-3.5%, and could potentially be used as a protein supplement for grazing if palatable. A subsequent study allowed sheep and goats to voluntarily feed on Atriplex halimus and aimed to determine if the saltbush was palatable, and if so, did it provide enough nutrients to supplement the diet of these animals. In this study they determined when goats and sheep are given as much A. halimus as they like, they do obtain enough nutrients to supplement their diet – unless the animal requirements are higher during pregnancy and milk production. It is presumed A. cinerea, would have similar biochemical properties to A. hamilus and A. nummularia as they are all closely related to one another (see cladogram of divergences in Atriplex), hence also having the potential to be used in agriculture.

== Recognition ==
Atriplex cinerea can be distinguished from other species of the genus Atriplex if it has all of the following features:

- A perennial shrub which can be dioecious (unlike A. semibraccata, A. acutibractea, A. angulate, A. eardleyae, A. leptocarpa, A. limbata, A. papillate, A. pseudocampanulata, A. pumilio, A. spinbractea, A. suberata and A. turbinata).
- The leaves are elliptic to oblong (unlike A. nummularia and A. rhagodioiode).
- The fruiting bracteoles are free and sessile (unlike A. stipitate)
- Bracteoles are without inflated spongy appendages (unlike A. vasicaria).
- The leaves are concolorous (unlike A. paludosa), being silvery or grey green on both sides. (Note: These features were created with the help of an online Atriplex key on the VicFlora website, retrieved from https://vicflora.rbg.vic.gov.au/flora/key/2191.)

There is no other species that have all the above features within the genus Atriplex. The specimen in question also has to be within the recognised area of distribution. If the specimen being identified is in a known revegetated area, the use of local council planting guides of the area increases the likelihood of correct identification.

== Conservation status ==
=== Australia ===
According to FloraBase, a website by the Western Australian Herbarium, Atriplex cinerea is not threatened. In South Australia, it is considered of "least concern – stable" by Seeds of South Australia, a conservation organisation sponsored by the South Australian Government. VicFlora does not describe its conservation status in Victoria. The advisory list of rare or threatened plants in Victoria (2014) do not mention Atriplex cinerea.

=== New Zealand ===
As at 2024, this species has been classified under the New Zealand Threat Classification System as being "Nationally Critical".
