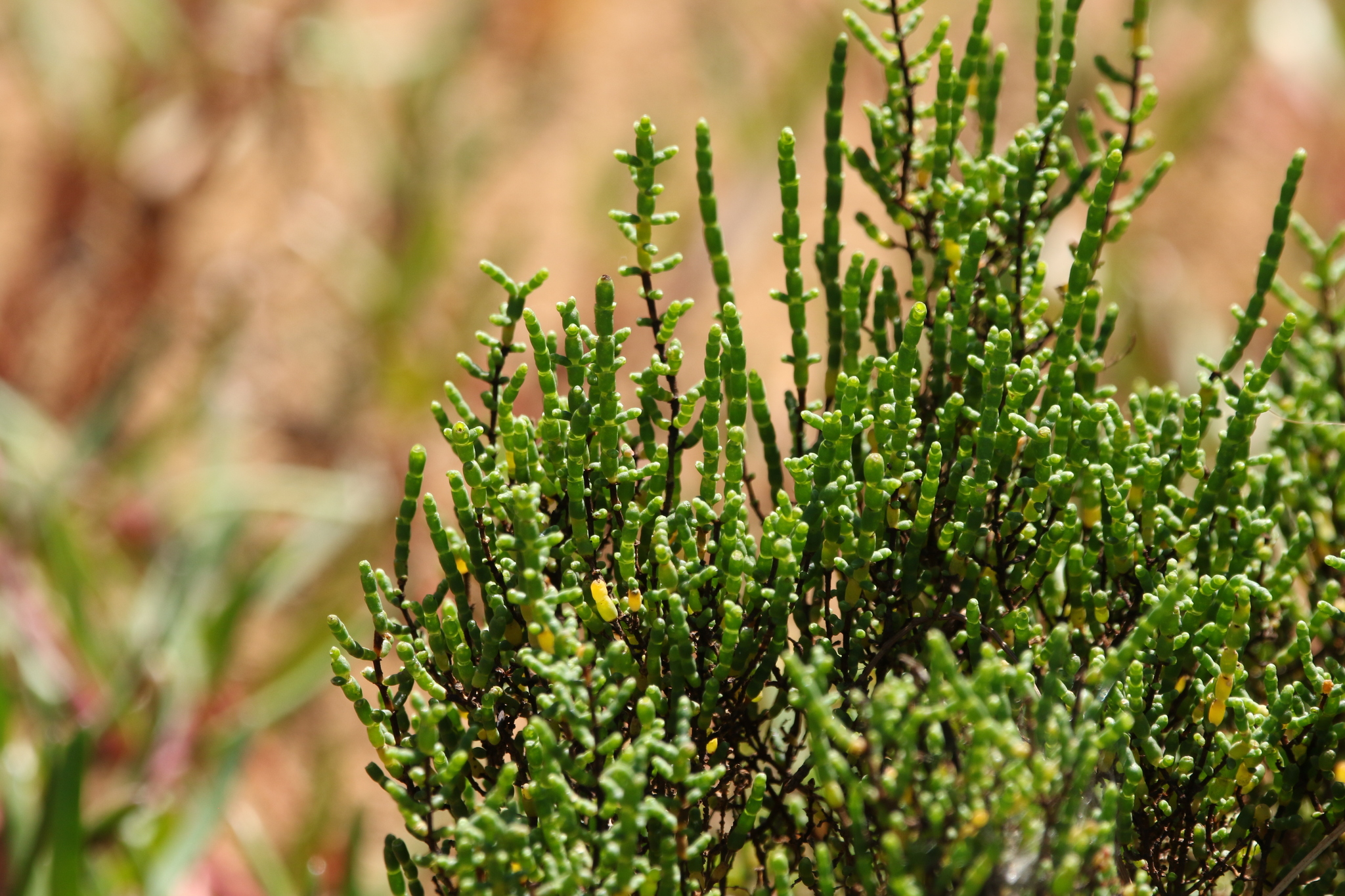
- Living specimen in the Great Sandy Strait
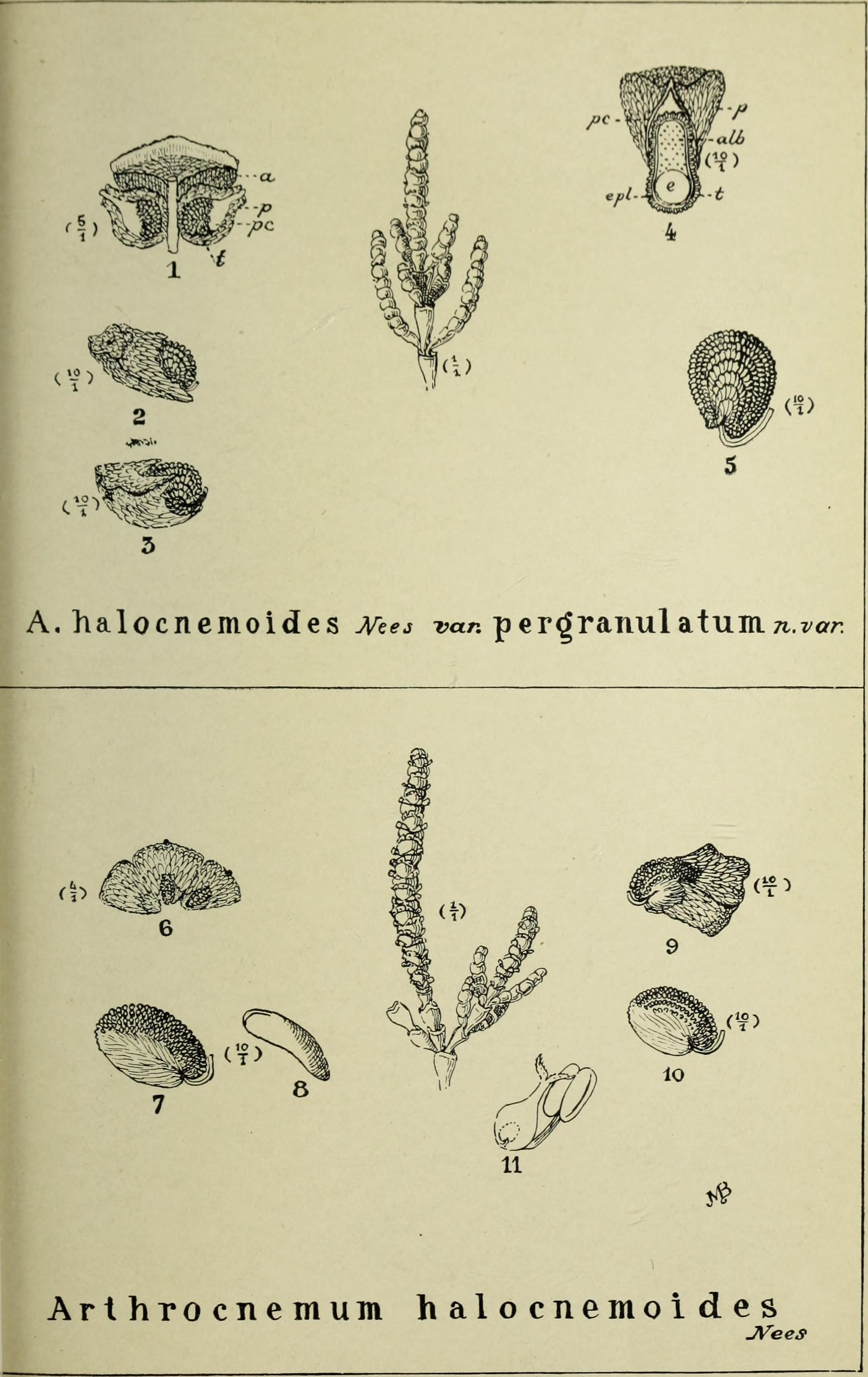
- Botanical illustration

Scientific classification
- Kingdom: Plantae
- Clade: Tracheophytes
- Clade: Angiosperms
- Clade: Eudicots
- Order: Caryophyllales
- Family: Amaranthaceae
- Genus: Tecticornia
- Species: T. halocnemoides

Binomial name
- Tecticornia halocnemoides (Nees) K.A.Sheph. & Paul G.Wilson

Subspecies
- T. halocnemoides subsp. halocnemoides T. halocnemoides subsp. caudata T. halocnemoides subsp. longispicata T. halocnemoides subsp. catenulata T. halocnemoides subsp. tenuis

= Tecticornia halocnemoides =

Shrubby samphire

Species of plant

Tecticornia halocnemoides, commonly known as shrubby samphire or grey glasswort, is a species of succulent, salt tolerant plant endemic to Australia. It grows as a spreading or erect shrub up to fifty centimetres high. It was first published as Arthrocnemum halocnemoides in 1845, but transferred into Halosarcia in 1980, and into Tecticornia in 2007.

It is a highly variable species, with five published subspecies, some of which are themselves highly variable. These are T. halocnemoides subsp. halocnemoides, T. halocnemoides subsp. caudata, T. halocnemoides subsp. longispicata, T. halocnemoides subsp. catenulata and T. halocnemoides subsp. tenuis. There is also an unpublished putative subspecies, which is currently given the manuscript name T. halocnemoides subsp. Lake Grace (N. Casson G231. 10).
