= List of Brachyscome species =

The following is a list of Brachyscome species accepted by the Australian Plant Census as at February 2026:

- Brachyscome abercrombiensis P.S.Short (N.S.W.)
- Brachyscome aculeata (Labill.) Less. – hill daisy (Qld, N.S.W., A.C.T., Vic., Tas.)
- Brachyscome ascendens G.L.Davis (Qld, N.S.W.)
- Brachyscome barkerae P.S.Short (N.S.W., Vic.)
- Brachyscome basaltica F.Muell. – swamp daisy (S.A., Qld., N.S.W., Vic.)
- Brachyscome bellidioides Steetz (W.A.)
- Brachyscome billabongensis P.S.Short (W.A.)
- Brachyscome blackii G.L.Davis (W.A., N.T., S.A.)
- Brachyscome breviscapis C.R.Carter (S.A.)
- Brachyscome brownii P.S.Short (N.S.W.)
- Brachyscome campylocarpa J.M.Black (S.A., Qld.)
- Brachyscome casstiana P.S.Short (N.S.W., Qld.)
- Brachyscome chrysoglossa F.Muell. – yellow-tongue daisy (N.S.W., Vic.)
- Brachyscome ciliaris (Labill.) Less. – variable daisy (W.A., N.T., S.A., Qld, N.S.W., Vic., Tas.)
- Brachyscome cuneifolia Tate (S.A., Vic.)
- Brachyscome curvicarpa G.L.Davis (Qld., N.S.W.)
- Brachyscome dalbyensis P.S.Short (Qld., N.S.W.)
- Brachyscome debilis Sond. – weak daisy (S.A., N.S.W., Vic.)
- Brachyscome decipiens Hook.f. – field daisy (S.A., N.S.W., A.C.T., Vic., Tas.)
- Brachyscome dentata Gaudich. (S.A., Qld., N.S.W., Vic., A.C.T.)
- Brachyscome dichromosomatica C.R.Carter (S.A., N.S.W., Vic.)
- Brachyscome dissectifolia G.L.Davis (N.S.W.)
- Brachyscome diversifolia (Graham ex Hook.) Fisch. & C.A.Mey. – large-headed daisy (S.A., N.S.W., A.C.T., Tas.)
- Brachyscome eriogona (J.M.Black) G.L.Davis (S.A., Qld., N.S.W.)
- Brachyscome exilis Sond. – slender daisy (W.A., S.A., N.S.W., Vic.)
- Brachyscome eyrensis J.H.Willis ex G.L.R.Davis (W.A.)
- Brachyscome foliosa P.S.Short (N.S.W., Vic.)
- Brachyscome formosa P.S.Short – Pilliga daisy (N.S.W.)
- Brachyscome georginensis P.S.Short – Pilliga daisy (Qld.)
- Brachyscome gilesii P.S.Short – (N.T., S.A., Qld.)
- Brachyscome glandulosa (Steetz) Benth. (W.A.)
- Brachyscome goniocarpa Sond. & F. Muell. – dwarf daisy (W.A., S.A., Vic.)
- Brachyscome gracilis G.L.Davis – dookie daisy (N.S.W., Vic.)
- Brachyscome graminea (Labill.) F.Muell. (S.A., N.S.W., A.C.T., Vic., Tas.)
- Brachyscome iberidifolia Benth. (W.A., N.T.)
- Brachyscome kaputarensis P.S.Short – (N.S.W.)
- Brachyscome lineariloba (DC.) Druce – hard-headed daisy (W.A., S.A., Qld., N.S.W., Vic.)
- Brachyscome melanocarpa Sond. & F. Muell. – black-seeded daisy (S.A., Qld., N.S.W.)
- Brachyscome microcarpa F.Muell. (Qld., N.S.W.)
- Brachyscome mittagongensis P.S.Short (N.S.W.)
- Brachyscome muelleri Sond. (S.A.)
- Brachyscome muelleroides G.L.Davis – Mueller daisy (N.S.W., Vic.)
- Brachyscome multifida DC. – cut-leaved daisy (Qld., N.S.W., Vic.)
- Brachyscome nivalis F.Muell. – snow daisy (N.S.W., A.C.T., Vic.)
- Brachyscome nodosa P.S.Short & Watan. (Qld., N.S.W.)
- Brachyscome nova-anglica G.L.Davis (Qld., N.S.W.)
- Brachyscome obovata G.L.Davis (N.S.W., A.C.T., Vic.)
- Brachyscome paludicola P.S.Short (S.A., Qld., N.S.W., Vic.)
- Brachyscome papillosa G.L.Davis – Mossgiel daisy (N.S.W.)
- Brachyscome parvula Hook.f. (S.A., Vic., Tas.)
- Brachyscome perpusilla (Steetz) J.M.Black – tiny daisy (W.A., S.A., N.S.W., Vic., Tas.)
- Brachyscome petrophila G.L.Davis (N.S.W., Vic.)
- Brachyscome procumbens G.L.Davis (N.S.W.)
- Brachyscome ptychocarpa F.Muell. (N.S.W., Vic.)
- Brachyscome pusilla Steetz (W.A.)
- Brachyscome radicans Steetz (N.S.W., A.C.T., Vic., Tas.)
- Brachyscome radicata Hook.f. (Tas.)
- Brachyscome rara G.L.Davis (S.A., Qld.)
- Brachyscome readeri G.L.Davis – southern daisy (S.A., N.S.W., Vic.)
- Brachyscome rigidula (DC.) G.L.Davis – hairy cut-leaf daisy, cut-leaf daisy (Qld., N.S.W., A.C.T., Vic., Tas.)
- Brachyscome riparia G.L.Davis (Vic.)
- Brachyscome rudallensis P.S.Short (W.A.)
- Brachyscome salkiniae P.S.Short (N.S.W., Vic.)
- Brachyscome scapigera (Sieber ex Spreng.) DC. – tufted daisy (Qld., N.S.W., A.C.T., Vic.)
- Brachyscome segmentosa C.Moore & F.Muell. – Lord Howe Island daisy (L.H.I.)
- Brachyscome sieberi DC. (N.S.W.)
- Brachyscome simulans P.S.Short (W.A.)
- Brachyscome smithwhitei P.S.Short & Watan. (Qld., N.S.W.)
- Brachyscome spathulata Gaudich. (N.S.W., Vic., Tas.)
- Brachyscome staceae P.S.Short (Qld., N.S.W.)
- Brachyscome stolonifera G.L.Davis (N.S.W.)
- Brachyscome stuartii Benth. (Qld., N.S.W.)
- Brachyscome tadgellii Tovey & P.Morris (Vic.)
- Brachyscome tamworthensis P.S.Short (N.S.W.)
- Brachyscome tasmanica P.S.Short (Tas.)
- Brachyscome tatei J.M.Black (W.A., S.A.)
- Brachyscome tenuiscapa Hook.f. (N.S.W., Tas.)
- Brachyscome tesquorum J.M.Black (W.A., N.T., S.A., Qld.)
- Brachyscome tetrapterocarpa G.L.Davis (Qld.)
- Brachyscome trachycarpa F.Muell. – inland daisy, smooth daisy (W.A., S.A., Qld., N.S.W. Vic.)
- Brachyscome triloba Gaudich. (N.S.W.)
- Brachyscome trisecta P.S.Short (N.S.W.)
- Brachyscome walshii P.S.Short (Vic.)
- Brachyscome watanabei P.S.Short (Qld., N.S.W.)
- Brachyscome whitei G.L.Davis – spreading daisy (Qld., N.S.W.)
- Brachyscome willisii P.S.Short (N.S.W., A.C.T., Vic.)
- Brachyscome xanthocarpa D.A.Cooke (S.A.)
