= Brachyscome angustifolia =

Species of flowering plant

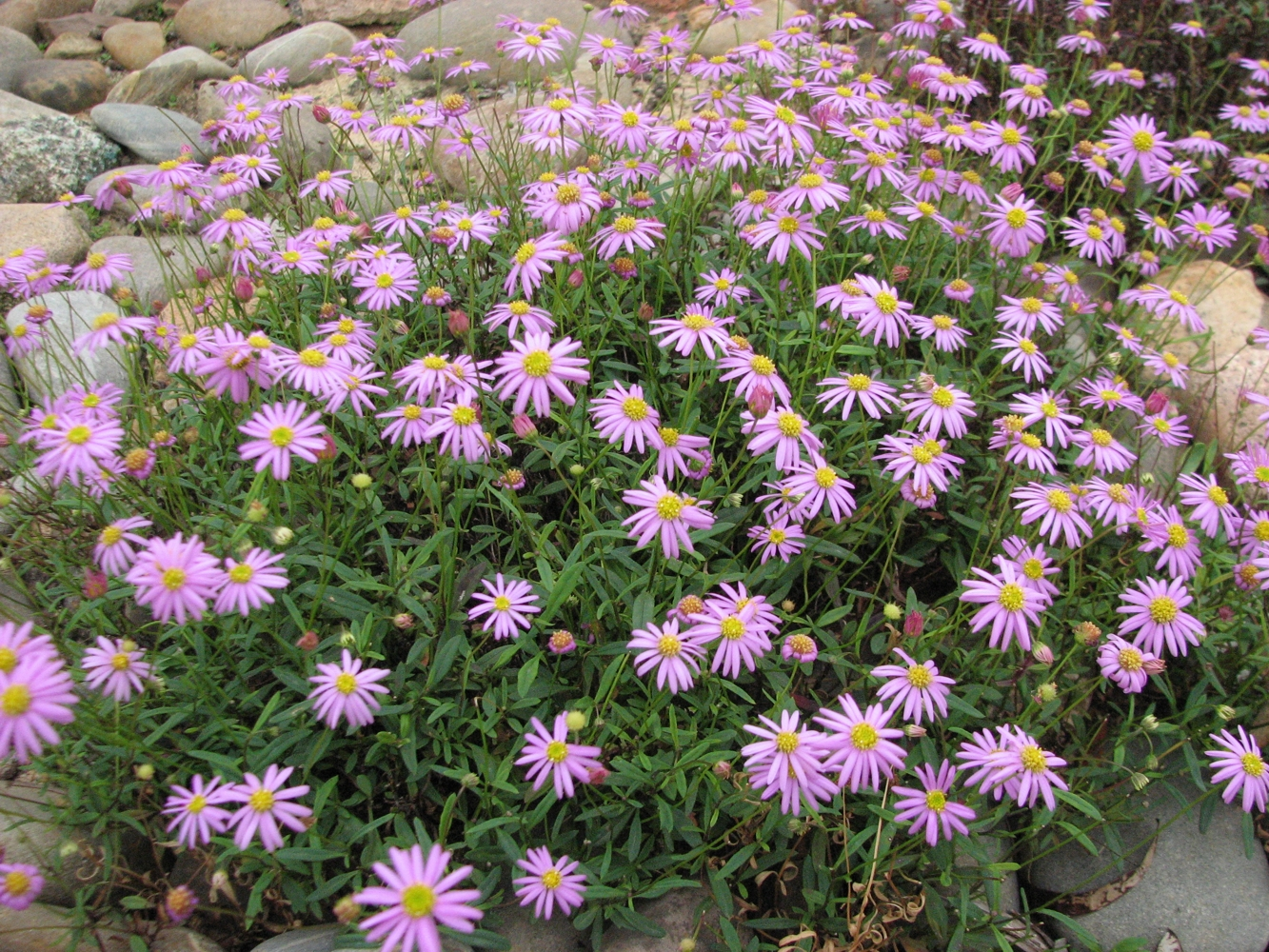
Brachyscome angustifolia

Brachyscome angustifolia is a former species name in the flowering plant genus Brachyscome.

Brachyscome angustifolia var. angustifolia is currently known as Brachyscome graminea.

The name Brachyscome angustifolia var. heterophylla is currently referred to the following species:

- Brachyscome brownii
- Brachyscome formosa
- Brachyscome kaputarensis
- Brachyscome linearifolia
- Brachyscome salkiniae
- Brachyscome sieberi
- Brachyscome triloba
- Brachyscome willisii
