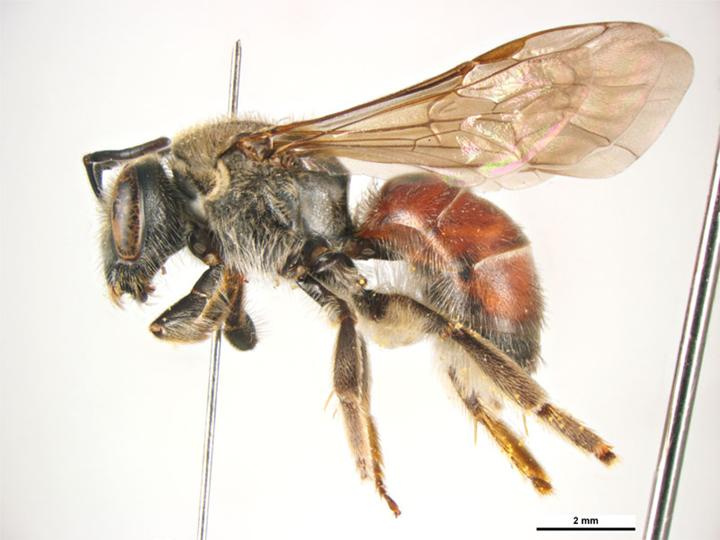
- Female

Scientific classification
- Kingdom: Animalia
- Phylum: Arthropoda
- Clade: Pancrustacea
- Class: Insecta
- Order: Hymenoptera
- Family: Halictidae
- Genus: Lasioglossum
- Species: L. lacthium

Binomial name
- Lasioglossum lacthium Smith, 1853

Synonyms
- Parasphecodes lacthius Smith, 1853; Parasphecodes froggatti Cockerell, 1905; Parasphecodes hirtiventris Cockerell, 1922; Halictus niveorufus Friese, 1924; Parasphecodes submeracus Cockerell, 1930

= Lasioglossum lacthium =

Species of bee

Lasioglossum lacthium, or Lasioglossum (Parasphecodes) lacthium, is a species of bee in the family Halictidae and subfamily Halictinae. It is endemic to Australia. It was described by English entomologist Frederick Smith in 1853.

== Distribution and habitat ==
The species occurs in south-eastern mainland Australia. Type localities include Ararat in Victoria, Bathurst and Ebor in New South Wales, and Stanthorpe in south-east Queensland.

== Behaviour ==
The adults are flying mellivores. Flowering plants visited by the bees include Brachyscome, Helichrysum, Hypochaeris, Olearia, Daviesia, Dillwynia, Gentiana, Eucalyptus, Leptospermum, Bursaria, Ranunculus and Xanthorrhoea species.

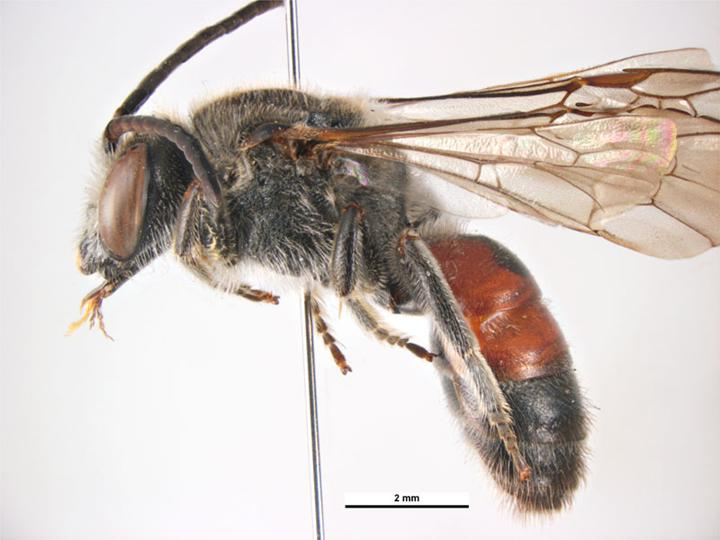
Male
