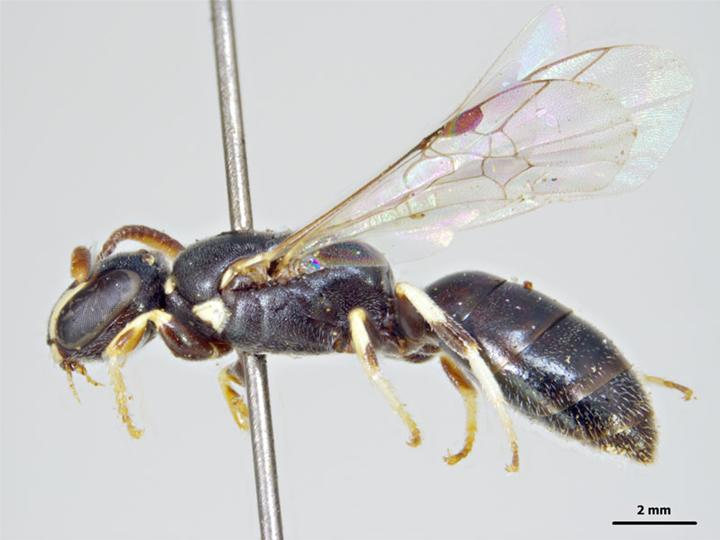
- Female

Scientific classification
- Kingdom: Animalia
- Phylum: Arthropoda
- Clade: Pancrustacea
- Class: Insecta
- Order: Hymenoptera
- Family: Colletidae
- Genus: Hylaeus
- Species: H. eugeniellus

Binomial name
- Hylaeus eugeniellus (Cockerell, 1910)

Synonyms
- Prosopis eugeniella Cockerell, 1910; Prosopis nana Friese, 1924

= Hylaeus eugeniellus =

Species of bee

Hylaeus eugeniellus, or Hylaeus (Prosopisteron) eugeniellus, is a species of bee in the family Colletidae and subfamily Hylaeinae. It is endemic to Australia. It was described by British-American entomologist Theodore Dru Alison Cockerell in 1910.

== Description ==
Female body length is about 3.5–4 mm. Integumental colouration is mainly black, with cream markings.

== Distribution and habitat ==
The species occurs in eastern Australia. The type locality is Mackay, Queensland.

== Behaviour ==
The adults are flying mellivores. Flowering plants visited by the bees include Angophora, Brachyscome, Callistemon, Eucalyptus, Eugenia and Leptospermum species.

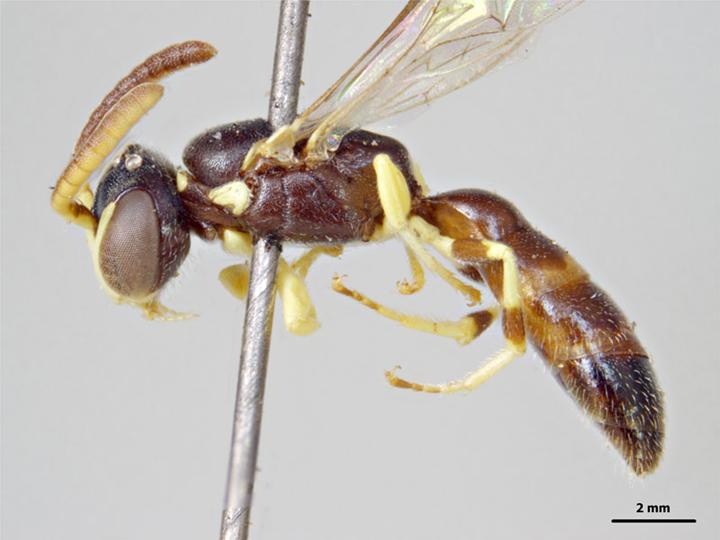
Male
