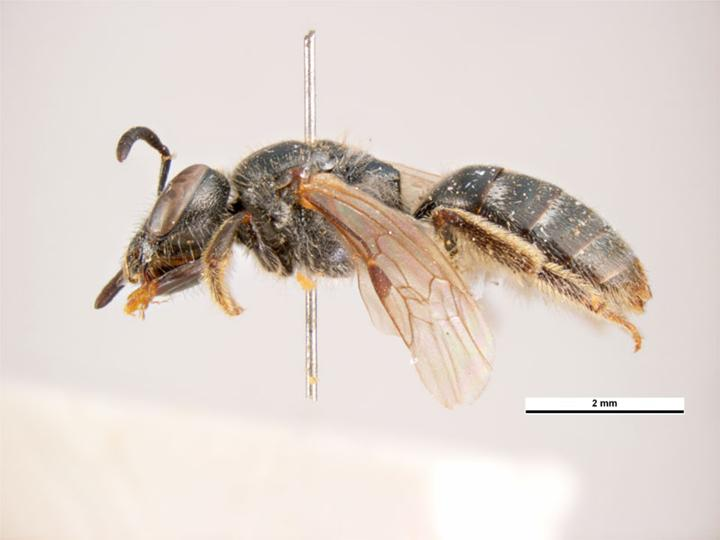
- Female
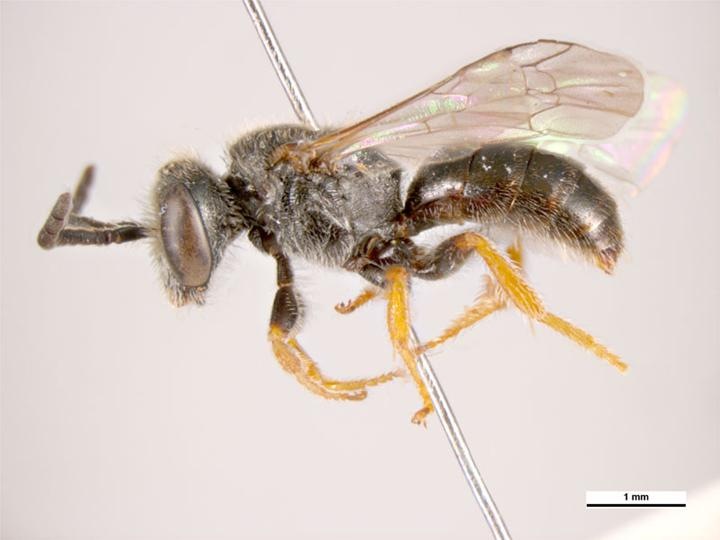
- Male

Scientific classification
- Kingdom: Animalia
- Phylum: Arthropoda
- Clade: Pancrustacea
- Class: Insecta
- Order: Hymenoptera
- Family: Halictidae
- Genus: Lasioglossum
- Species: L. imitans

Binomial name
- Lasioglossum imitans (Cockerell, 1914)

Synonyms
- Halictus imitans Cockerell, 1914; Halictus isthmalis Cockerell, 1914; Halictus repertus Cockerell, 1914; Halictus confusellus Cockerell, 1916

= Lasioglossum imitans =

Species of bee

Lasioglossum imitans, or Lasioglossum (Chilalictus) imitans, is a species of bee in the family Halictidae and subfamily Halictinae. It is endemic to Australia. It was described by British-American entomologist Theodore Dru Alison Cockerell in 1914.

== Description ==
Female body length is about 6.5 mm. Integumental colouration is mainly black, with cream and reddish markings; the hair is white.

== Distribution and habitat ==
The species occurs across southern and south-eastern Australia. Type localities include Launceston and Eaglehawk Neck in Tasmania, as well as from near Melbourne in Victoria.

== Behaviour ==
The adults are flying mellivores. Flowering plants visited by the bees include Acacia, Boronia, Bossiaea, Brachyscome, Bursaria, Conospermum, Eucalyptus, Leptospermum, Melaleuca, Petrophile, Pultenaea, Senecio and Thelymitra species.
