= Lasioglossum melanopterum =

Scientific classification
- Kingdom: Animalia
- Phylum: Arthropoda
- Clade: Pancrustacea
- Class: Insecta
- Order: Hymenoptera
- Family: Halictidae
- Genus: Lasioglossum
- Species: L. melanopterum

Binomial name
- Lasioglossum melanopterum (Cockerell, 1914)

Synonyms
- Halictus melanopterus Cockerell, 1914; Halictus spenceri Cockerell, 1916

Species of bee

Lasioglossum melanopterum, or Lasioglossum (Chilalictus) melanopterum, is a species of bee in the family Halictidae and subfamily Halictinae. It is endemic to Australia. It was described by British-American entomologist Theodore Dru Alison Cockerell in 1914.

== Description ==
Female body length is about 10 mm. Integumental colouration is mainly black; with white to dark greyish-brown hair.

== Distribution and habitat ==
The species occurs in south-west Western Australia. The type locality is Yallingup.

== Behaviour ==
The adults are flying mellivores. Flowering plants visited by the bees include Brachyscome, Pimelea, Scaevola and Stylidium species.
