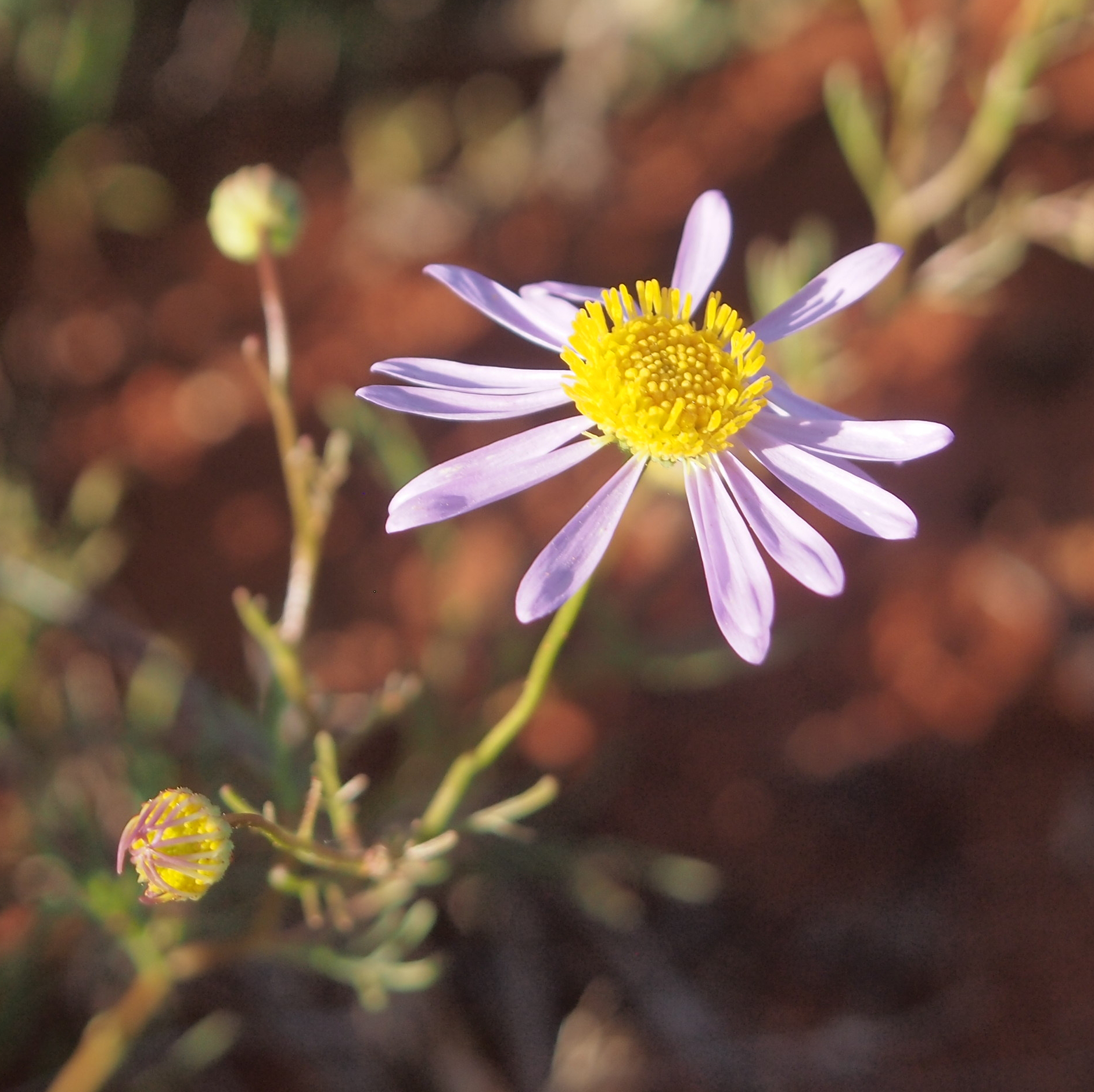

Scientific classification
- Kingdom: Plantae
- Clade: Tracheophytes
- Clade: Angiosperms
- Clade: Eudicots
- Clade: Asterids
- Order: Asterales
- Family: Asteraceae
- Genus: Brachyscome
- Species: B. gilesii

Binomial name
- Brachyscome gilesii P.S.Short

= Brachyscome gilesii =

Species of flowering plant

Brachyscome gilesii is a flowering perennial herb in the family Asteraceae.
