= Brachyscome dichromosomatica =

Scientific classification
- Kingdom: Plantae
- Clade: Tracheophytes
- Clade: Angiosperms
- Clade: Eudicots
- Clade: Asterids
- Order: Asterales
- Family: Asteraceae
- Genus: Brachyscome
- Species: B. dichromosomatica

Binomial name
- Brachyscome dichromosomatica C.R.Carter

Species of flowering plant

Brachyscome dichromosomatica is a small flowering plant that is found in parts of Australia. It is notable for its exceptionally low chromosome number of 2n=4, the smallest known among land plants.

== Description ==
Brachyscome dichromosomatica is an ephemeral plant that grows upright up to 25 centimeters tall. The leaves either grow from the base of the plant or from the lower part of its scape (stem). The leaf blades are up to 8 cm long with 5–9 distinct segments. The scape lacks hairs and grows straight upright with a length of 3–25 cm. The flower head grows up to 1.3 cm wide. It contains 8–13 involucral bracts that are 0.15–0.4 cm broad and are sometimes a reddish-purple color. There are 8–16 florets on ligules that are 0.5–1.2 cm long and range in color from white to blue. The pollen receptacle is 0.2–0.3 cm wide and is hemispherical with deep pits. The fruit is a wide, roughly triangular shape in profile, with a tapering cylindrical body. It is covered in silky hairs on its edges. Surrounding the fruit is a visible pappus with bristles of varying lengths.

== Taxonomy ==
Brachyscome dichromosomatica was described by Charles Carter in 1978. The species was divided from Brachyscome lineariloba because of the wide variation in appearance of B. lineariloba. Together with Brachyscome breviscapis, these new species made up the "Brachyscome lineariloba species complex" of closely related taxa. Within this complex is Brachyscome eriogona, another particularly similar species. B. dichromosomatica differs from B. eriogona by the shape of its achenes and its larger size.

Carter also established two varieties of B. dischromosomatica based on the color of the plant's ligules: those of var. alba are white while those of var. dichromosomatica are light blue.

== Cytology ==
Brachyscome dichromosomatica has a chromosome number of 2n=4. It is one of only six angiosperms and two dicotyledons with this low number, the other dicotyledon being Rhynchospora tenuis.

In addition to its two pairs of standard chromosomes, the species also can contain up to three accessory chromosomes, or "B chromosomes". It is the only plant with a chromosome number of 2n=4 and additional B chromosomes. There are two types of B chromosomes: large, which are stable, and micro, which are not. A Brachyscome dichromosomatica plant has one of four different suites of accessory chromosomes in arrangements called cytodemes (A1, A2, A3, A4). When the four cytodemes arose is unknown, but A4 is believed to be the oldest and A3 the most isolated. All of the B chromosomes contain inert ribosomal DNA that is not transcribed.

== Ecology ==
The species is native to the provinces of South Australia and New South Wales in Australia. The alba variety is only found in New South Wales. The plants have a habitat of dried riverbeds and claypans.
