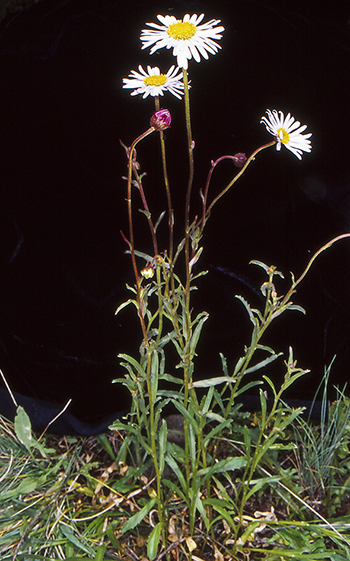

Scientific classification
- Kingdom: Plantae
- Clade: Tracheophytes
- Clade: Angiosperms
- Clade: Eudicots
- Clade: Asterids
- Order: Asterales
- Family: Asteraceae
- Genus: Brachyscome
- Species: B. aculeata

Binomial name
- Brachyscome aculeata (Labill.) Less.

= Brachyscome aculeata =

Hill daisy

Species of flowering plant

Brachyscome aculeata, commonly known as hill daisy, is a tufted perennial herb in the family Asteraceae and is endemic to Australia. It has mostly white daisy-like flowers, a yellow centre, variable-shaped leaves, and flowers from spring to autumn.

== Description ==
Brachyscome aculeata is a herb with ascending branches, 20–60 cm (7.9–23.6 in) tall with leafy stems. The leaves may be either smooth or with hairs, lower leaves lance-shaped, broader at the apex or narrow and rounded at the end, 2–9 cm (0.79–3.54 in) long, 5–15 mm (0.20–0.59 in) wide, usually with a straight edge but occasionally with teeth or lobes. The uppermost leaves are smooth-edged, narrow to lance-shaped. The flowers are white, rarely pink, daisy-like 4 cm (1.6 in) across with a central yellow disc. The 12-20 flower bracts are arranged in rows, egg-shaped to narrow lance-shaped, 5–8 mm (0.20–0.31 in) long and 1.7–2.5 mm (0.067–0.098 in) wide, edges rounded or sharply pointed. The dry fruit is one-seeded, egg-shaped, 3–3.5 mm (0.12–0.14 in) long, 2.1–2.5 mm (0.083–0.098 in) wide, either smooth or a finely warty surface. Flowering occurs from October to April.

== Taxonomy and naming ==
The species was originally named Bellis aculeata in 1806 by Jacques Labillardière and the description published in Novae Hollandiae Plantarum Specimen. In 1832 Christian Friedrich Lessing changed the name to Brachyscome aculeata and the description was published in Synopsis Generum Compositarum. The specific epithet (aculeata) is derived from the Latin word aculeatus meaning "prickly" or "sharp-pointed".

== Distribution and habitat ==
In New South Wales hill daisy is found growing in dry locations in the southern tablelands from Wingello to Kosciuszko National Park. In Victoria mainly found in the east of the state growing in wet locations, in the Grampians region, also at higher altitudes but rarely into open herb fields.
