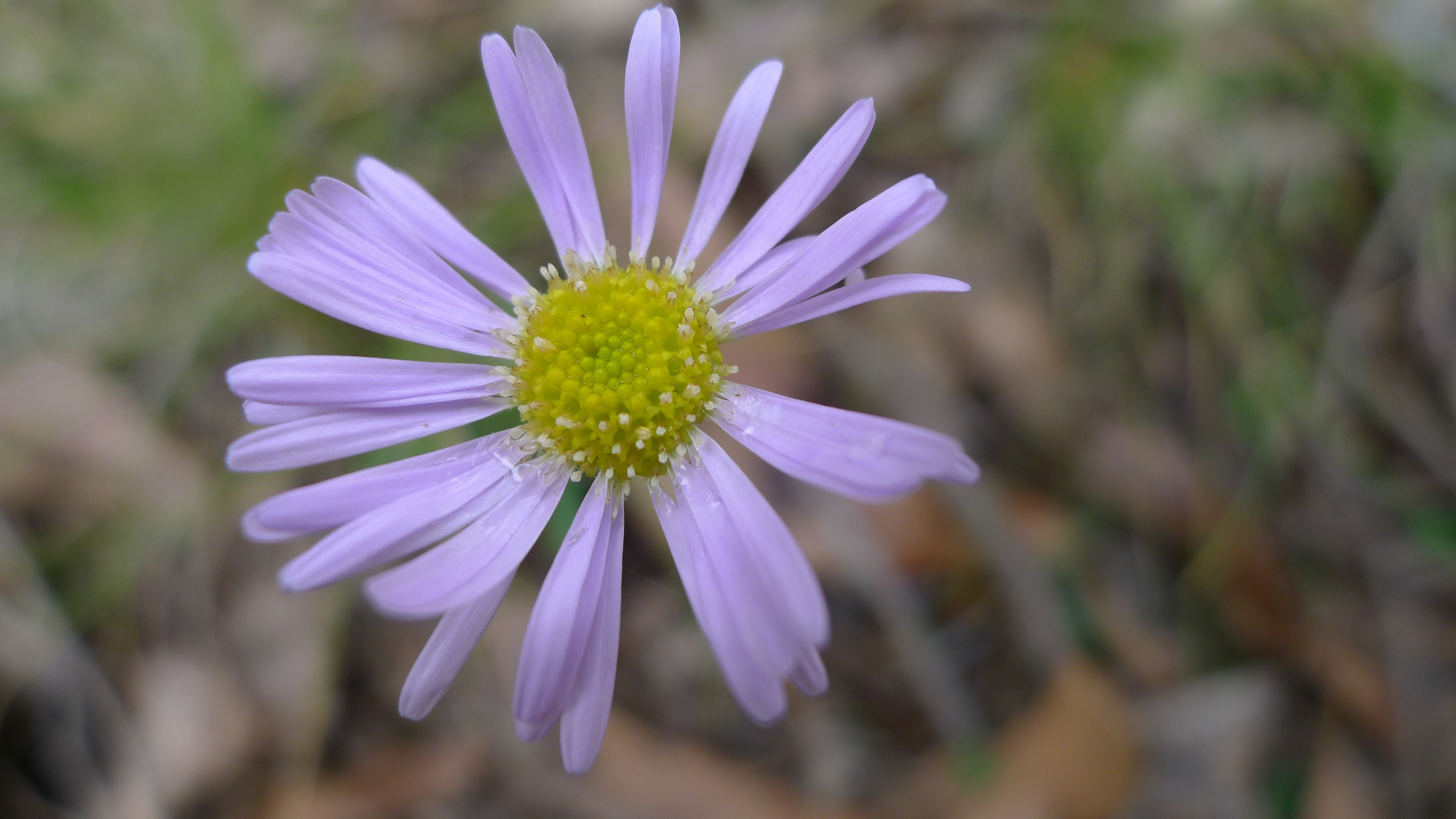

Scientific classification
- Kingdom: Plantae
- Clade: Tracheophytes
- Clade: Angiosperms
- Clade: Eudicots
- Clade: Asterids
- Order: Asterales
- Family: Asteraceae
- Genus: Brachyscome
- Species: B. spathulata

Binomial name
- Brachyscome spathulata Gaudich.

= Brachyscome spathulata =

Spoon-leaved daisy

Species of flowering plant

Brachyscome spathulata, commonly known as spoon-leaved daisy, is a flowering plant in the family Asteraceae. It has dark green leaves, mauve daisy-like flowers and grows in New South Wales, Tasmania, Victoria and the Australian Capital Territory.

== Description ==
Brachyscome spathulata is an upright, more or less smooth perennial herb to 60 cm (24 in) high with a rosette of leaves at the base. The basal leaves are spoon-shaped, 3–6 cm (1.2–2.4 in) long, 8–34 mm (0.31–1.34 in) wide, margins toothed and sessile. The upper leaves are oblong-shaped, toothed, decreasing in size up the stem, woolly, 5–40 mm (0.20–1.57 in) long, 1–11 mm (0.039–0.433 in) wide and sessile. The flowers heads are borne singly, 10–20 mm (0.39–0.79 in) in diameter, glandular, downy and the peduncle 15–40 cm (5.9–15.7 in) long. The involucral bracts are lance-shaped, herbaceous, membranous, glandular to covered with short, soft hairs. The florets are mauve or light blue, occasionally white, a yellow central disc and the petal-like ligules 5–15 mm (0.20–0.59 in) long. Flowering stems hairy, bracts in a single row of about 20–30, narrowly elliptic or oblong-lance shaped, 6–9 mm (0.24–0.35 in) long, 1–1.7 mm (0.039–0.067 in) wide and usually green. Flowering occurs from October to June and the fruit is a flattened, wedge-shaped cypsela, 2.2–5 mm (0.087–0.197 in) long, 1.1–2.5 mm (0.043–0.098 in) wide, brown and smooth.

== Taxonomy and naming ==
Brachyscome spathulata was first formally described in 1830 by Charles Gaudichaud-Beaupré and the description was published in Voyage Autour du Monde ... sur les Corvettes de S.M. l'Uranie et la Physicienne. Botanique. The specific epithet (spathulata) means "spoon-shaped".

== Distribution and habitat ==
Spoon-leaved daisy grows mostly in sub-alpine woodland, heath, grassland and dry forests in New South Wales, Tasmania, Victoria and the Australian Capital Territory.
