= Brachyscome campylocarpa =

Scientific classification
- Kingdom: Plantae
- Clade: Tracheophytes
- Clade: Angiosperms
- Clade: Eudicots
- Clade: Asterids
- Order: Asterales
- Family: Asteraceae
- Genus: Brachyscome
- Species: B. campylocarpa

Binomial name
- Brachyscome campylocarpa J.M.Black

Species of flowering plant

Brachyscome campylocarpa, commonly known as large white daisy, is a species of flowering plant in the family Asteraceae and is endemic to Australia. It is an annual herb with many erect or ascending stems, linear or pinnatisect leaves with four to nine lobes, and white, daisy-like flowers white a yellow centre.

== Description ==
Brachyscome campylocarpa is an annual herb that typically grows to a height of 4–35 cm (1.6–13.8 in) or more, with many erect or ascending stems, branches 30–60 cm (12–24 in) long. The leaves are borne at the base of the plant or on the stems and are arranged alternately, sometimes linear 10–35 mm (0.39–1.38 in) long and 0.2–1 mm (0.0079–0.0394 in) wide, or pinnatisect, 10–50 mm (0.39–1.97 in) long with four to nine oblong to linear lobes 1.2–11 mm (0.047–0.433 in) long and 0.4–0.9 mm (0.016–0.035 in) wide. The involucre at the base of the flower is about 4–10 mm (0.16–0.39 in) in diameter with seven to thirteen bracts 3.3–5.4 mm (0.13–0.21 in) long and the peduncle extends above the leaves. There are five to fifteen florets 6.7–7.4 mm (0.26–0.29 in) long and 2.0–2.5 mm (0.079–0.098 in) wide surrounding up to 100 yellow disc florets. The cypselas are mostly dark brown to black, 2.1–3.0 mm (0.083–0.118 in) long.

== Taxonomy ==
Brachyscome campylocarpa was first formally described by John McConnell Black in 1928 and the description was published in Transactions and Proceedings of the Royal Society of South Australia from specimens collected on Minnie Downs near the Diamantina River.

== Distribution and habitat ==
Large white daisy grows in depressions between sand dunes and on flood plains in central and southern South Australia and in south-western Queensland.

== Conservation status ==
Brachyscome campylocarpa is listed as of "least concern" under the Queensland Government Nature Conservation Act 1992.
