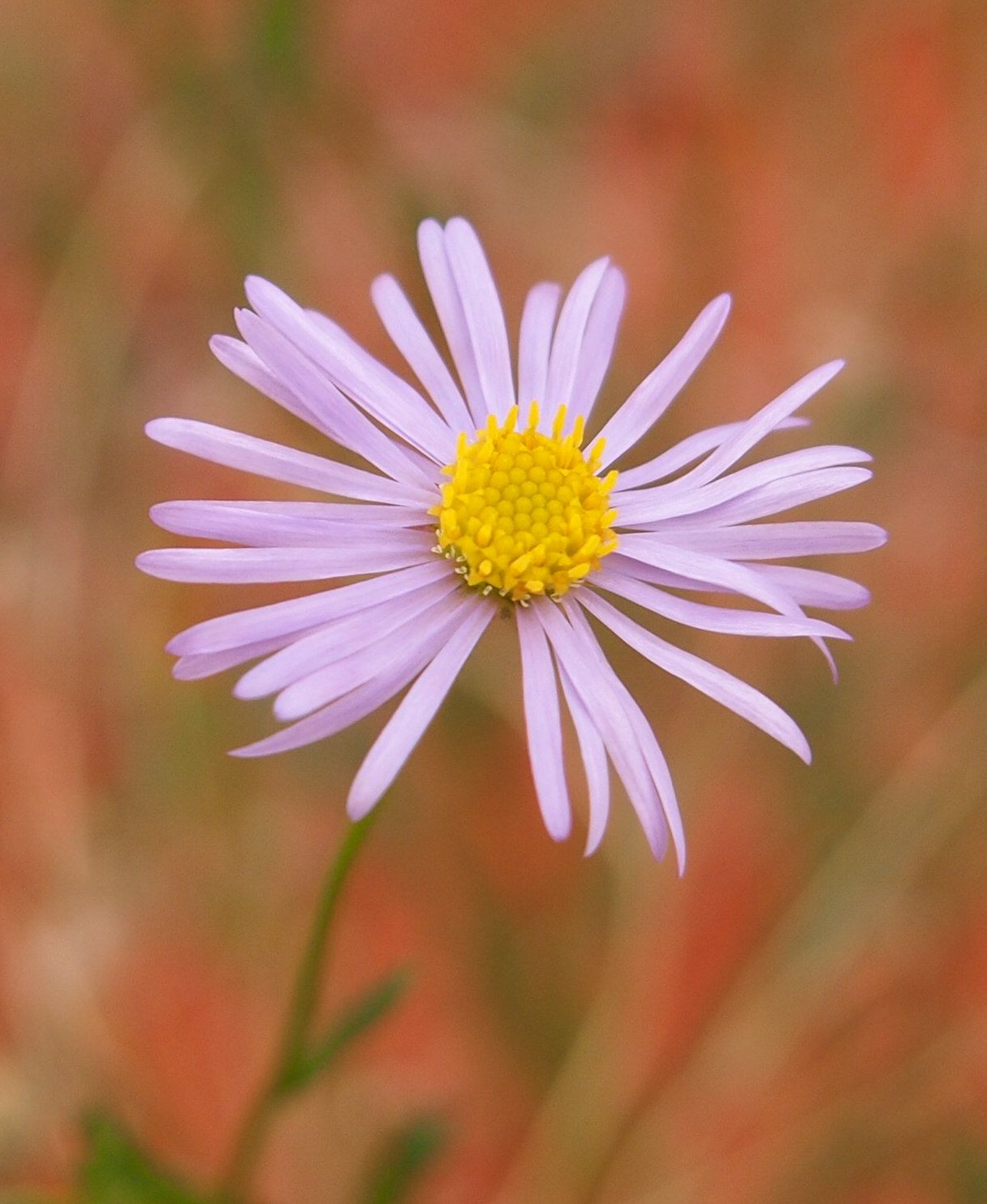

Scientific classification
- Kingdom: Plantae
- Clade: Tracheophytes
- Clade: Angiosperms
- Clade: Eudicots
- Clade: Asterids
- Order: Asterales
- Family: Asteraceae
- Genus: Brachyscome
- Species: B. ciliaris

Binomial name
- Brachyscome ciliaris (Labill.) Less.

= Brachyscome ciliaris =

Variable daisy

Species of plant

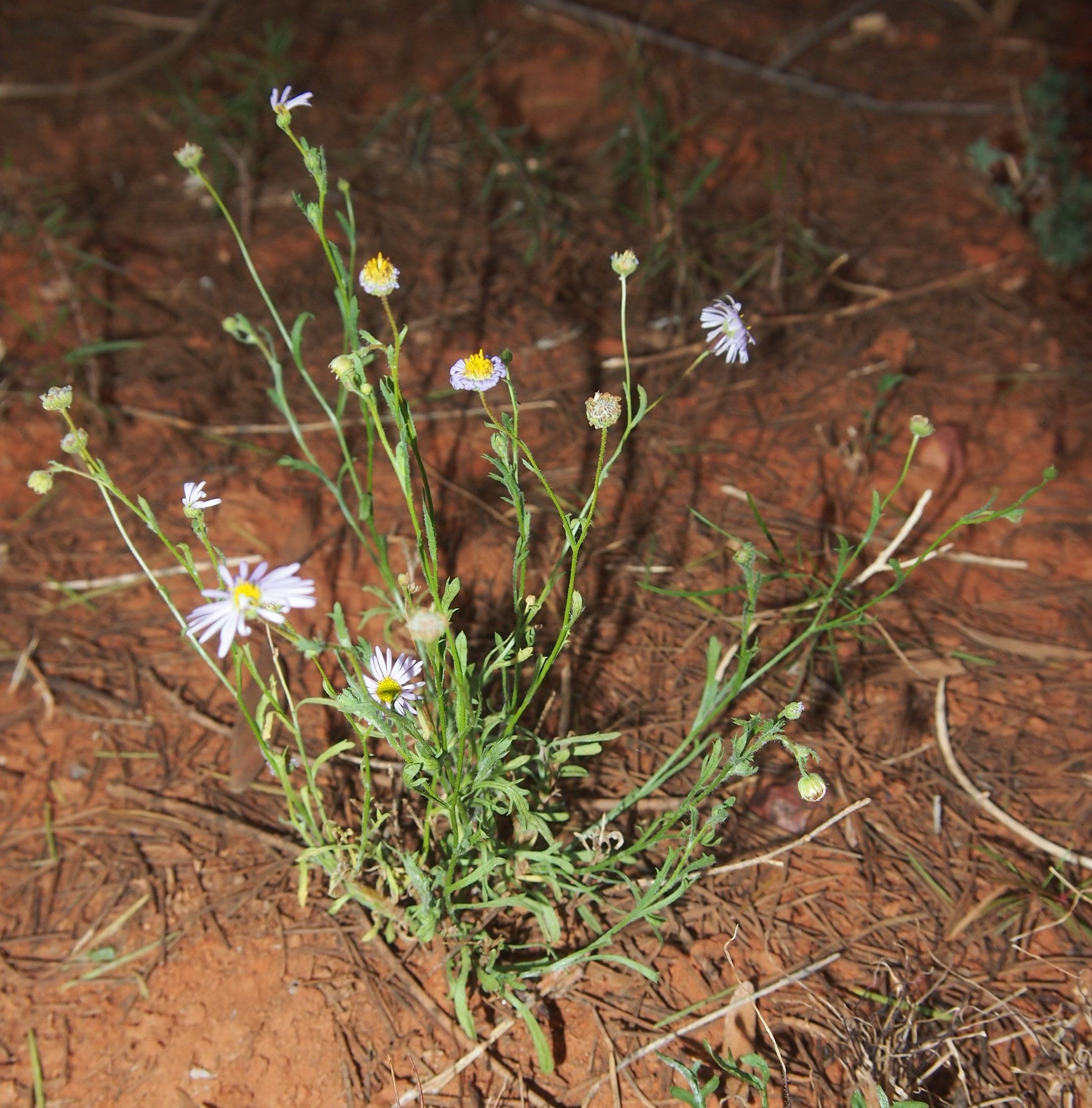
Habit

Brachyscome ciliaris, commonly known as variable daisy, is a flowering plant in the family Asteraceae it is a small, bushy, perennial herb with white or mauve daisy-like flowers. It grows in the Northern Territory and mainland states of Australia with the exception of South Australia.

== Description ==
Brachyscome ciliaris is an upright or ascending perennial herb to 45 cm (18 in) high with smooth, occasionally woolly or soft glandular hairs. The leaves may be linear, divided or deeply lobed, narrow at the base and sessile. The white or mauve flower heads 7–15 mm (0.28–0.59 in) in diameter, peduncle thread-like, bracts green, pointed, jagged and lance-shaped. Flowering may occur throughout the year and the fruit is an oblong to egg-shaped, flattened achene 1.5–2.5 mm (0.059–0.098 in) long and brown.

== Taxonomy and naming ==
This species was first collected by Jacques Labillardière and published in his 1806 Novae Hollandiae Plantarum Specimen under the name Bellis ciliaris. In 1832 Christian Friedrich Lessing transferred it into Brachyscome, and the name has been Brachyscome ciliaris ever since. Because it is such a variable species, specimens have often been referred to new species, and hence this species has many taxonomic synonyms, among them: Brachyscome drummondii Walp., Brachyscome ciliaris var. brachyglossa Gauba, Brachyscome dimorphocarpa G.L.R.Davis, Brachyscome billardierei Benth. and Brachyscome ciliaris var. lanuginosa (Steetz) Benth.. The specific epithet (ciliaris) refers to the margins of the fruit.

== Distribution and habitat ==
Geographically speaking, it is very widely distributed, occurring in every Australian state. It is somewhat restricted in terms of habitat, however, favouring red earths and grey sands over limestone or clay, in disturbed areas and on the margins of salt pans.
