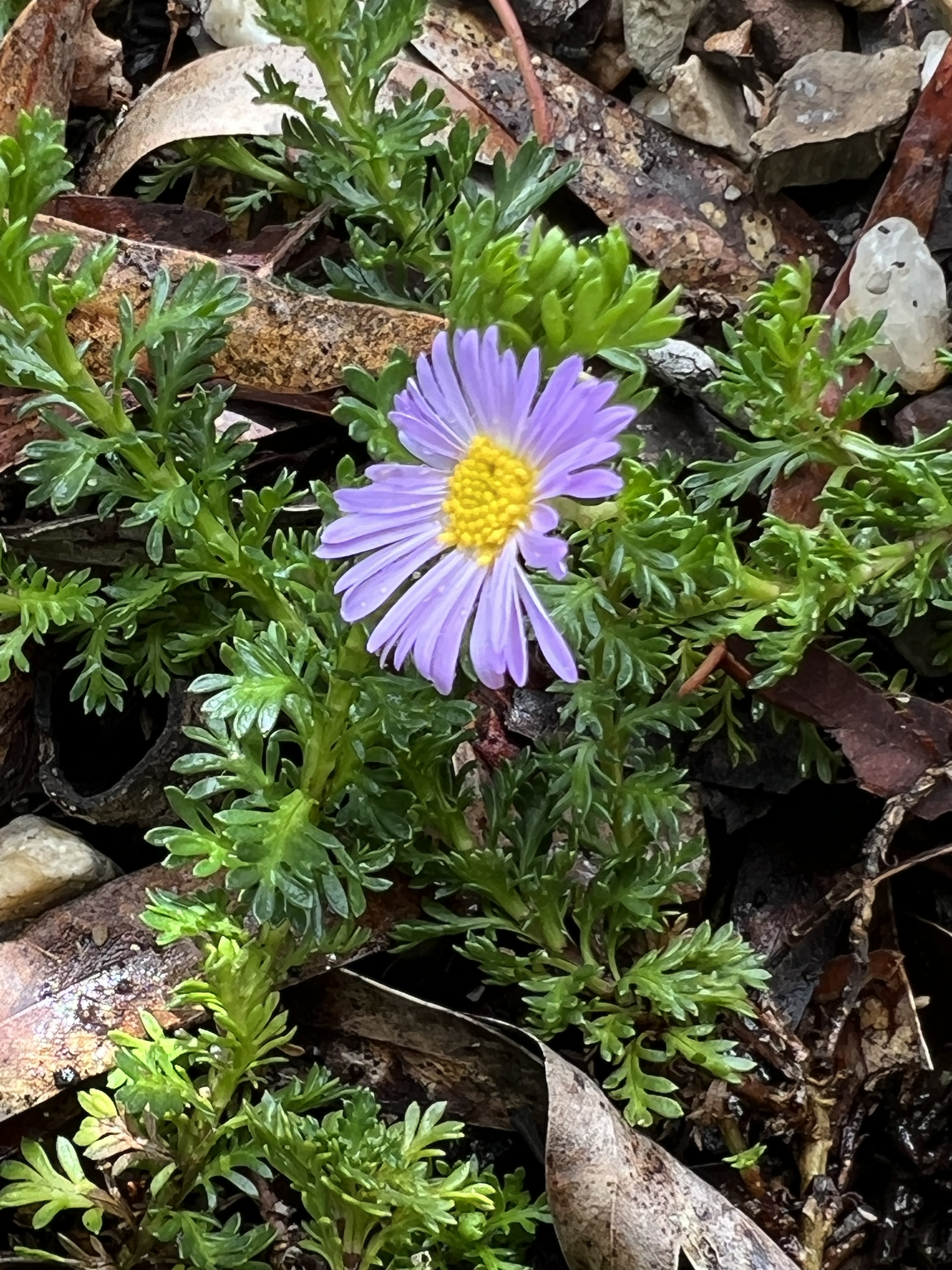

Scientific classification
- Kingdom: Plantae
- Clade: Tracheophytes
- Clade: Angiosperms
- Clade: Eudicots
- Clade: Asterids
- Order: Asterales
- Family: Asteraceae
- Genus: Brachyscome
- Species: B. rigidula

Binomial name
- Brachyscome rigidula (DC.) G.L.Davis

= Brachyscome rigidula =

Cut-leaf daisy

Species of flowering plant

Brachyscome rigidula commonly known as cut-leaf daisy or hairy cut-leaf daisy, is a perennial herb in the family Asteraceae and is endemic to Australia. It is a small herb with white or pale blue flowers.

== Description ==
Brachyscome rigidula is a hairy, glandular, rambling perennial to 36 cm (14 in) high. The leaves are crowded, cauline, strongly scented, dissected, arranged in linear segments to 8 mm (0.31 in) long and about 1 mm (0.039 in) wide. The blue or white flowers are borne singly, 8–10 mm (0.31–0.39 in) in diameter, disc florets yellow, peduncle glandular, softly hairy, 6–12 cm (2.4–4.7 in) long, involucral bracts jagged, oblong-shaped and pointed. Flowering occurs from October to February and the fruit is an egg-shaped, flattened achene, 2.2–2.9 mm (0.087–0.114 in) long, brown and about 0.2 mm (0.0079 in) long.

== Taxonomy and naming ==
This species was first described by Augustin Pyramus de Candolle as Steiroglossa rigidula. In 1948 Gwenda Louise Davis changed the name to Brachyscome rigidula and the description was published in Proceedings of the Linnean Society of New South Wales. The specific epithet (rigidula) means "stiff, hard".

== Distribution and habitat ==
Brachyscome rigidula grows in woodlands and forests at higher altitudes in well-drained soils in Tasmania, New South Wales, Queensland, Victoria and the Australian Capital Territory.
