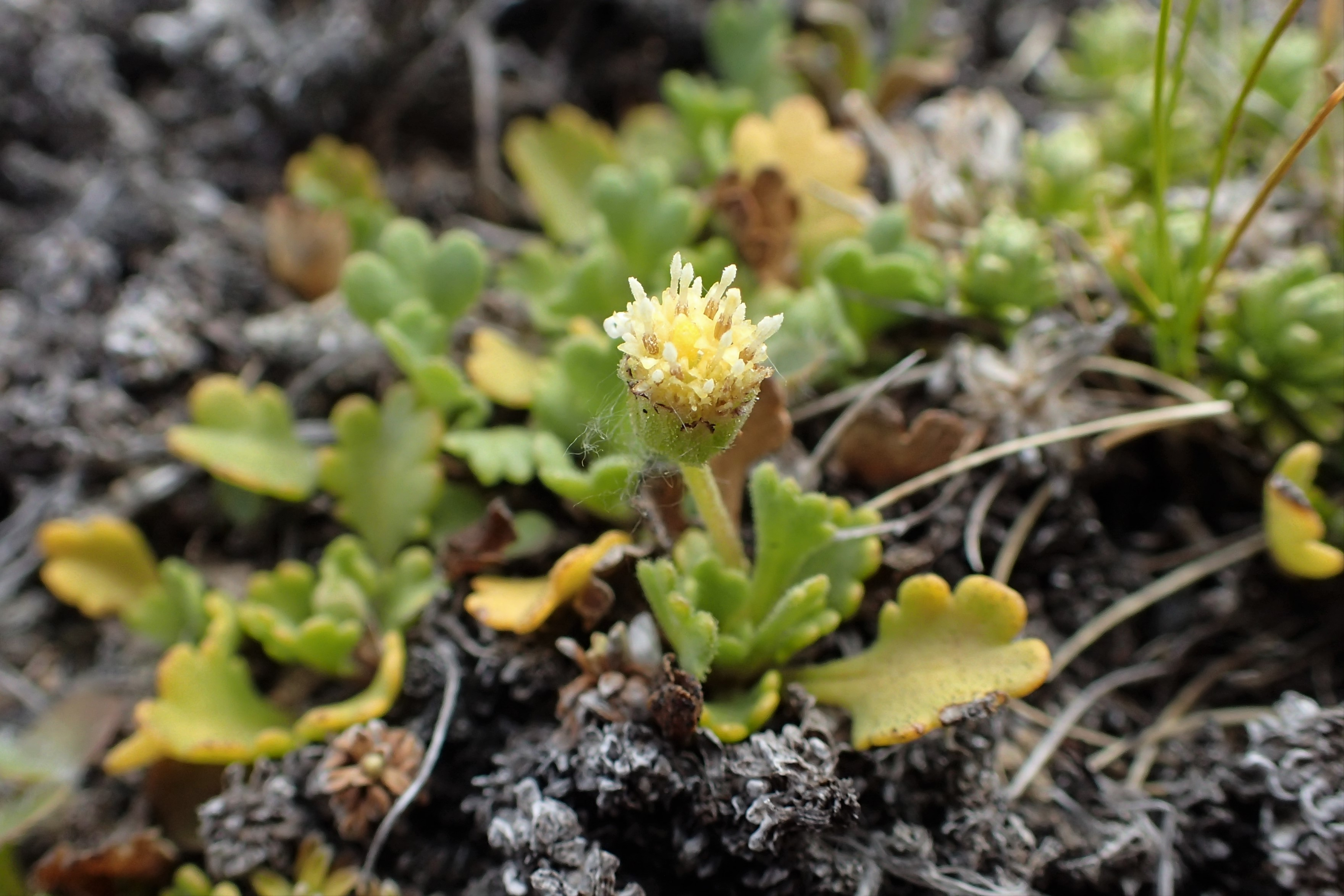

Scientific classification
- Kingdom: Plantae
- Clade: Tracheophytes
- Clade: Angiosperms
- Clade: Eudicots
- Clade: Asterids
- Order: Asterales
- Family: Asteraceae
- Genus: Brachyscome
- Species: B. radicata

Binomial name
- Brachyscome radicata Hook.f.

= Brachyscome radicata =

Spreading daisy

Species of flowering plant

Brachyscome radicata, commonly known as spreading daisy, or roniu in te Reo Māori is a flowering perennial herb in the family Asteraceae. It has yellow flowers and leaves forming a rosette at the base and grows in Tasmania and New Zealand.

== Description ==
Brachyscome radicata is a perennial herb with upright, soft branches with oblong to lance-shaped or spoon-shaped leaves about 15–85 mm (0.59–3.35 in) long, 3–20 mm (0.12–0.79 in) wide, occasionally entire but mostly with 3-12 lobes, smooth with scattered hairs. Bracts about 12–18, variably shaped, 2.7–5.7 mm (0.11–0.22 in) long, 1.1–2.2 mm (0.043–0.087 in) wide, margins whitish or light brown. The corolla including ray florets about 5–8 mm (0.20–0.31 in) long, 5 lobes, yellow and 5 stamens. Flowering and fruiting occurs from November to April and the fruit is an egg-shaped achene, 2.6–3.6 mm (0.10–0.14 in) long, 0.85–1.45 mm (0.033–0.057 in) wide and brown.

== Taxonomy ==
Brachyscome radicata was first formally described in 1852 by Joseph Dalton Hooker and the description was published in The botany of the Antarctic voyage of H.M. discovery ships Erebus and Terror. II. Flora Novae-Zelandiae.

== Distribution and habitat ==
Brachyscome radicata is endemic to New Zealand
