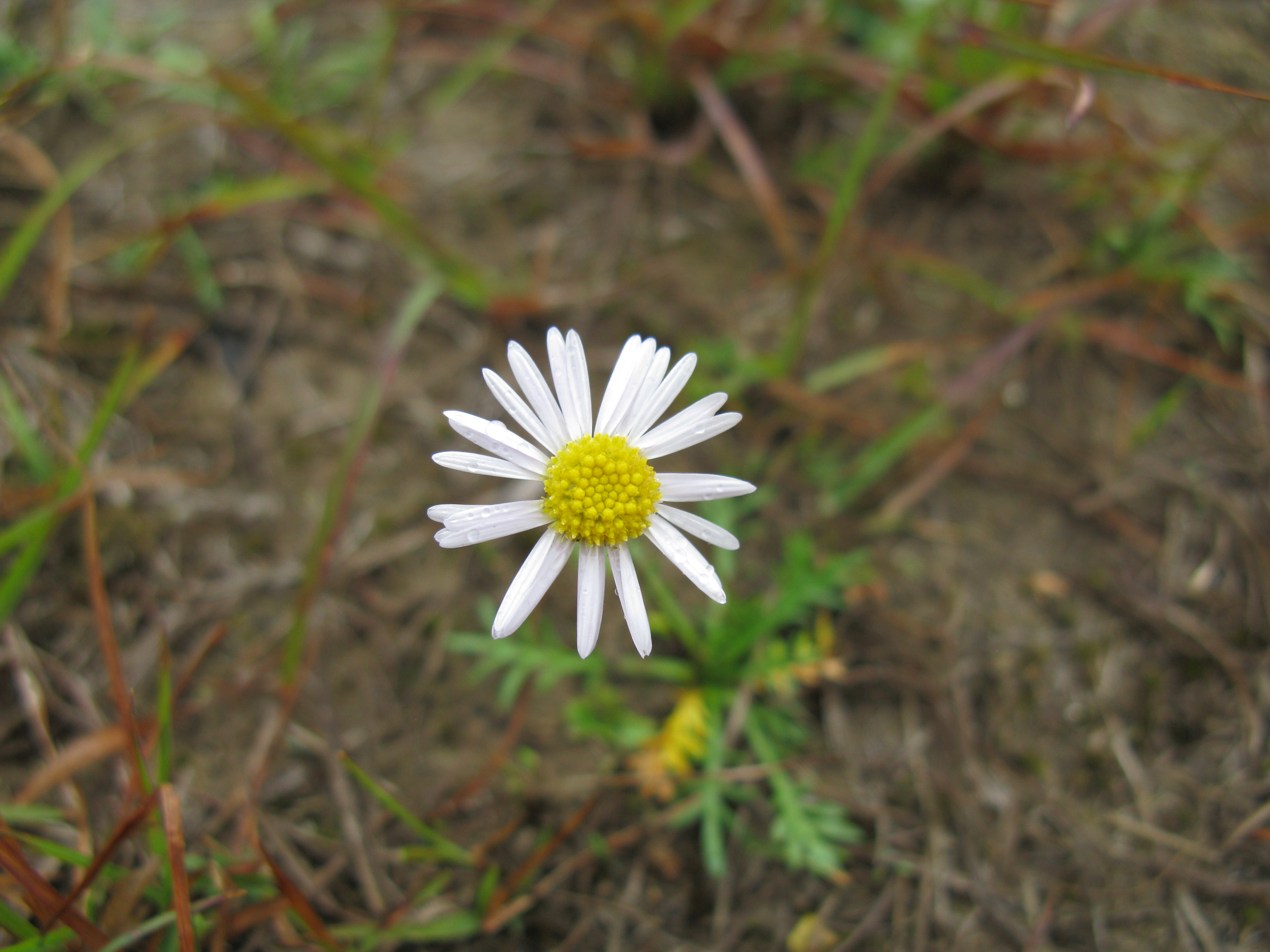

Scientific classification
- Kingdom: Plantae
- Clade: Tracheophytes
- Clade: Angiosperms
- Clade: Eudicots
- Clade: Asterids
- Order: Asterales
- Family: Asteraceae
- Genus: Brachyscome
- Species: B. dissectifolia

Binomial name
- Brachyscome dissectifolia G.L.Davis

= Brachyscome dissectifolia =

Swamp daisy

Species of flowering plant

Brachyscome dissectifolia commonly known as swamp daisy, is a flowering perennial herb in the family Asteraceae. It is a prostrate plant with slender stolon stems, mauve or white flowers and is endemic to New South Wales.

== Description ==
Brachyscome dissectifolia is a perennial flowering plant with slender, ascending stoloniferous stems to 17 cm (6.7 in) high that are mostly smooth except for occasional hairs at the base of leaves. The leaves are oblong-lance shaped, arranged at the base, up to 6.5 cm (2.6 in) long, margins entire or deeply lobed. The white or mauve singular flowers are about 5 mm (0.20 in) in diameter, peduncle 4–17 cm (1.6–6.7 in) long, involucral bracts blunt or rounded and finely toothed. Flowering occurs from September to May and the fruit is an obovate-wedge-shaped achene about 1.5 mm (0.059 in) long, bristly and brownish to black.

== Taxonomy and naming ==
Brachyscome dissectifolia was first formally described in 1948 by Gwenda Louise Davis and the description was published in Proceedings of the Linnean Society of New South Wales. The specific epithet (dissectifolia) means deeply divided.

== Distribution and habitat ==
Swamp daisy grows in swampy conditions usually near roadsides from Guyra to Port Stephens.
