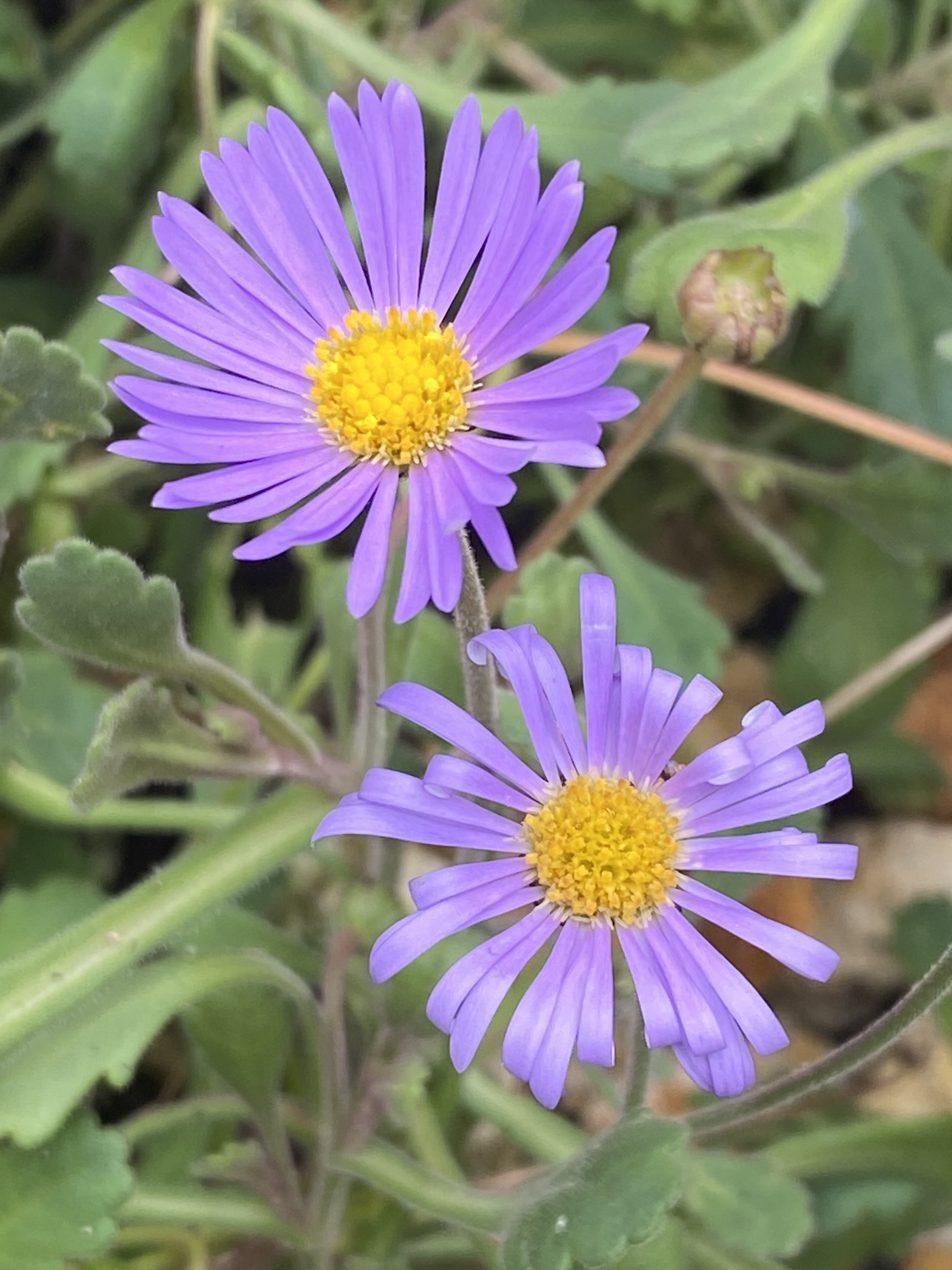

Scientific classification
- Kingdom: Plantae
- Clade: Tracheophytes
- Clade: Angiosperms
- Clade: Eudicots
- Clade: Asterids
- Order: Asterales
- Family: Asteraceae
- Genus: Brachyscome
- Species: B. microcarpa

Binomial name
- Brachyscome microcarpa Muell.

= Brachyscome microcarpa =

Forest daisy

Species of flowering plant

Brachyscome microcarpa, commonly known as forest daisy, is a perennial herb in the family Asteraceae and is endemic to Australia. It has mostly white or mauve daisy-like flowers, a yellow centre, variable shaped leaves and flowers from October to January.

== Description ==
Brachyscome microcarpa is a spreading or slightly upright perennial up to 58 cm (23 in) high with glandular-softly hairy to sometimes smooth stems. The leaves at the base of the stem when present are rounded to spoon-shaped, pinnate or scalloped, up to 7.5 cm (3.0 in) long with a petiole. Higher leaves are narrowly egg-shaped to wedge shaped or circular, scalloped to pinnate with linear lobes up to 8 mm (0.31 in) long, occasionally palmate and with a petiole. The flowers are borne singly, 3.5–8 mm (0.14–0.31 in) in diameter, peduncle glabrous up to 18 cm (7.1 in) long, bracts narrowly egg-shaped, rounded with jagged margins and the petals are usually white or bluish mauve. Flowering occurs from October to November and the fruit is an achene, egg-shaped to wedge-shaped, flattened, brown to black, warty, hairy and 1–1.8 mm (0.039–0.071 in) long.

== Taxonomy and naming ==
Brachyscome microcarpa was first formally described in 1858 by Ferdinand von Mueller and the description was published in Fragmenta Phytographiae Australiae. The specific epithet (microcarpa) means "small fruited".

== Distribution and habitat ==
Forest daisy grows north of Newcastle and Queensland in well-drained locations in forests.
