= Cytodeme =

Organisms that use an identical suite of chromosomes

The Cytodeme is the total assembly of organisms that use an identical suite of chromosomes to carry their genes. The term was first printed in the 1950s in a book by Heslop-Harrison. Discussing the Deme Terminology - he continued "cytodeme, a population differing in some distinctive cytological feature from others." In most cases the suite is composed of several pairs of homologous chromosomes with or without a pair of sex chromosomes. Since the only acceptable proof of the identity (homology) of chromosomes lies in their ability to pair fully from end to end during meiosis it follows that:

1. In asexual taxa membership of a cytodeme can only be presumed on such evidence as visual similarity of chromosomal ideotype, but never proved.
2. In sexual taxa all of the members of one cytodeme are fully intercompatible (within the limits of sex and other genetical constraints like self-incompatibility mechanisms) yielding the fertile progeny which proves their membership.

As a general rule for most species all of its members are of the same cytodeme excepting only the infrequent aneuploid aberrants. However some species are known to include several chromosome races which must necessarily belong to different cytodemes. Although it is not intrinsic in the formal definition it is a matter of common observation that members of different cytodemes are essentially cross-incompatible and any hybrids that do arise are usually highly infertile.

== Significance ==
The current surge of interest in cytodemes stems from the realisation that membership of the cytodeme is not necessarily restricted to the members of one species: frequently two or more species are in fact of the same cytodeme. Although fully intercompatible and yielding fertile hybrids when they do cross these species never or rarely cross-breed in the natural environment because they are spatially isolated, geographically and/or ecologically. Typically the species involved are members of the same genus. There are now a substantial number of cases in which two or more species of the same cytodeme are clearly different and even in different genera. Thus all five diploid species recognised in the genus Brassicella and both species recognised in the genus Hutera (7spp. in total) are in the same cytodeme. Perhaps the most extreme case on record concerns the wild grass, teosinte, Euchlaena mexicana and the strikingly different Maize, or Indian Corn, Zea mays, both 2n=20, fully interfertile and yielding fertile hybrids. There is perhaps a remote possibility that two such very different species could have evolved independently from distinct sources and converged in their chromosomal ideotype until they became members of the same cytodeme (including the capacity to cross-breed). It is more likely, though, that the cytodeme arose first complete with its suite of chromosomes and breeding patterns all intact and then, remaining constant in its fundamentals, it diversified into species sometimes so different as to merit generic distinction. Thus, in what may be termed the cytodeme adjunct to Darwinian theory, evolution becomes a two-stage process - first, the establishment of distinct cytodemes reproductively isolated both from one another and from all previously existing cytodemes; second, diversification within cytodeme to yield taxonomically recognisable (but not reproductively isolated) species.

Whereas the second stage is Natural Selection as expounded by Darwin, the first stage is not necessarily Darwinian. In the special case of polyploidy it is known that the first stage is not Darwinian. Doubling the chromosome number of the sterile hybrid between two diploid cytodemes yields an allotetraploid which is both fertile within its bounds and essentially incompatible with all previous life forms.

As yet no mechanism is known which could account for the origin of new diploid cytodemes - nor is there any proof that there are any diploid cytodemes of recent origin. Indeed, the evidence is that cytodemes are remarkably long lived. Presumably the Platanus cytodeme existed on Pangaea before that land fragmented. The present day forms of Platanus - P. orientalis in Europe and P. occidentalis in America - are fully intercompatible when brought together artificially in Botanic Gardens yielding fertile hybrids like the London plane, establishing not only that they are in the same cytodeme as one another but also that they are both in the same cytodeme as their common ancestor of approximately 200 million years ago.
