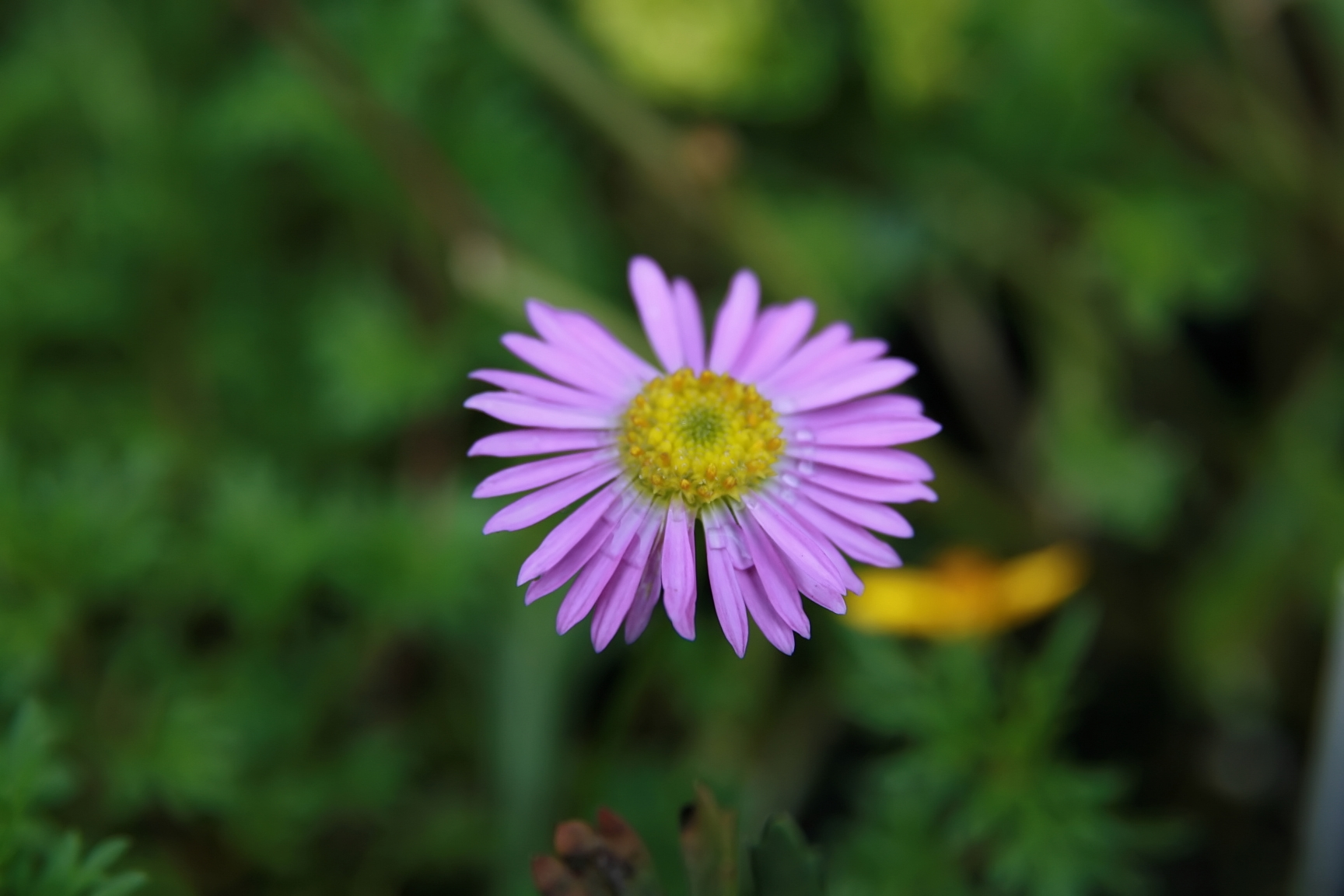

Scientific classification
- Kingdom: Plantae
- Clade: Tracheophytes
- Clade: Angiosperms
- Clade: Eudicots
- Clade: Asterids
- Order: Asterales
- Family: Asteraceae
- Genus: Brachyscome
- Species: B. segmentosa

Binomial name
- Brachyscome segmentosa C.Moore & F.Muell.

= Brachyscome segmentosa =

Species of flowering plant

Brachyscome segmentosa, commonly known as the Lord Howe Island daisy or mountain daisy, is a herb in the family Asteraceae. The specific epithet comes from the Latin segmentum ("segment") with the suffix -osa (indicating abundance), alluding to the many deep divisions of the leaf.

== Description ==
The plant grows up to 40 cm in height, and about the same in width. The bright green lobed leaves are 3–7 cm long and 1–2 cm wide. The flowers are terminal on 20 cm scapes; the ray florets are white, the disc florets yellow, with a corolla diameter of 2.5–4 cm.

== Distribution and habitat ==
The daisy is endemic to Australia's subtropical Lord Howe Island in the Tasman Sea. It is common on damp rocky ledges at medium to higher elevations on the island's southern mountains, but is rare in the lowlands. It is closely related to Brachyscome diversifolia var. maritima Benth., which is found on islands in Bass Strait.

The plant has been introduced to cultivation. The cultivar Brachyscome 'Valencia' is believed to be a hybrid between B. segmentosa and B. angustifolia var. heterophylla.
