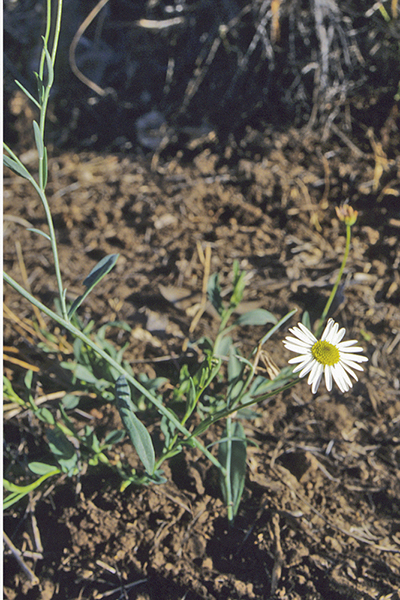

Scientific classification
- Kingdom: Plantae
- Clade: Embryophytes
- Clade: Tracheophytes
- Clade: Spermatophytes
- Clade: Angiosperms
- Clade: Eudicots
- Clade: Asterids
- Order: Asterales
- Family: Asteraceae
- Genus: Brachyscome
- Species: B. basaltica

Binomial name
- Brachyscome basaltica F.Muell.

= Brachyscome basaltica =

Species of flowering plant

Brachyscome basaltica, commonly known as swamp daisy, is a perennial herb in the family Asteraceae and is endemic to Australia. It has mostly white daisy-like flowers and a yellow centre.

== Description ==
Brachyscome basaltica is a perennial herb with slender, tufted branches 30–60 cm (12–24 in) long. The leaves are borne either along the aerial stems in clusters at the base of the stems. The branches are smooth or with glandular hairs less than 0.1 mm (0.0039 in) long. The leaves lance, egg-shaped or narrower, sessile, 30–50 mm (1.2–2.0 in) long, 3–14 mm (0.12–0.55 in) wide, tapering at the base. They are more or less sharply pointed at the apex, margins smooth, sometimes with a wavy appearance. The cluster of 10-22 overlapping bracts 3.5–5 mm (0.14–0.20 in) in diameter, individual bracts 2.5–4 mm (0.098–0.157 in) long, 1.1–2 mm (0.043–0.079 in) wide. The bracts soft, dry edges and the outer surface smooth or with a few glandular hairs. The flowers consist of 24-42 white or mauve petals, each petal about 4–6 mm (0.16–0.24 in) long. The one-seeded dry fruit initially flattened becoming more or less swollen at maturity, 1.5–2 mm (0.059–0.079 in) long with small warty protuberances on the surface.

== Taxonomy ==
Brachyscome basaltica was first formally described by Ferdinand von Mueller in 1858 and the description was published in his Fragmenta Phytographiae Australiae.

== Distribution and habitat ==
Swamp daisy grows in wetter location in New South Wales, Victoria and Queensland.
