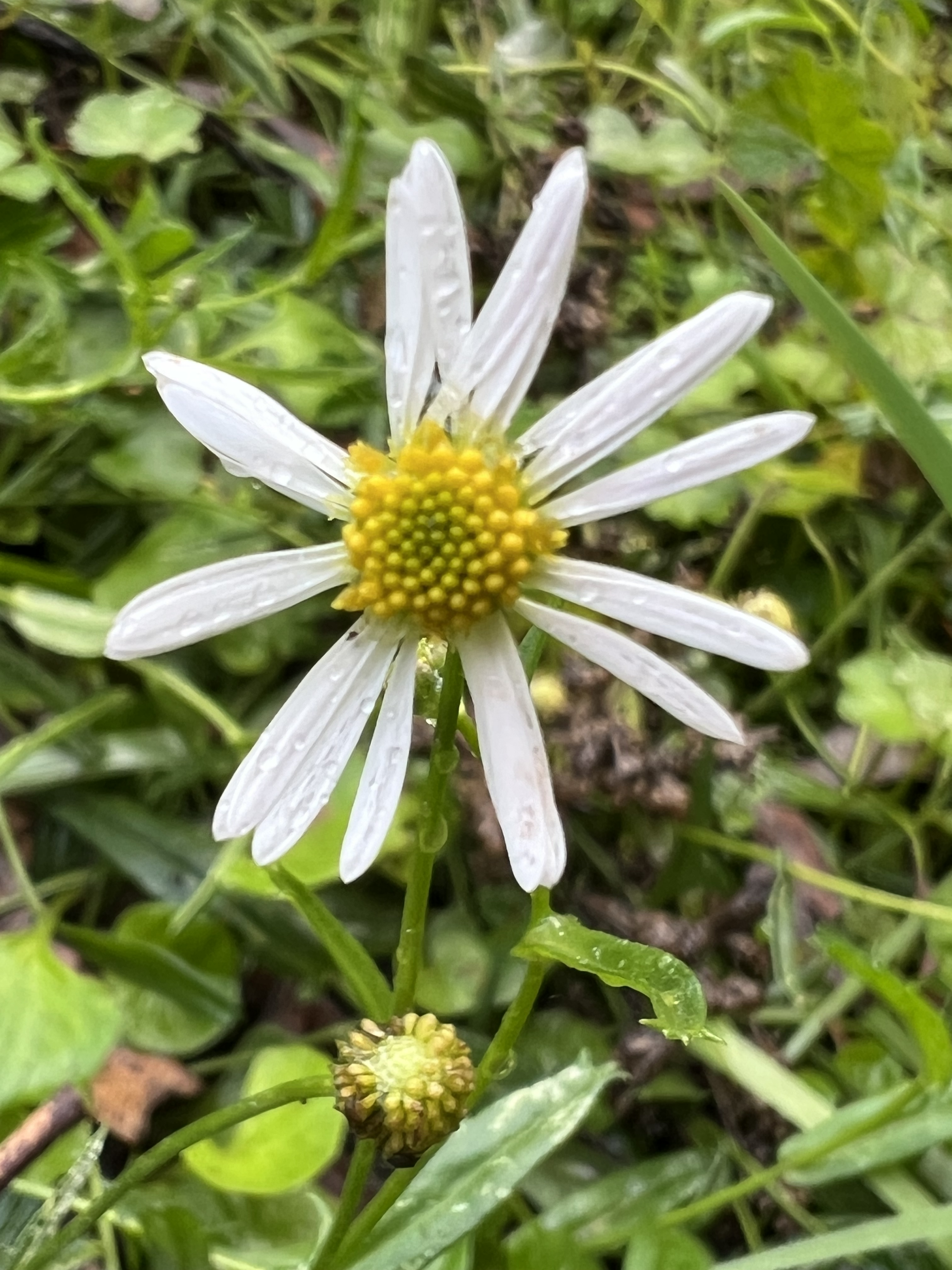

Scientific classification
- Kingdom: Plantae
- Clade: Tracheophytes
- Clade: Angiosperms
- Clade: Eudicots
- Clade: Asterids
- Order: Asterales
- Family: Asteraceae
- Genus: Brachyscome
- Species: B. mittagongensis

Binomial name
- Brachyscome mittagongensis P.S.Short

= Brachyscome mittagongensis =

Species of flowering plant

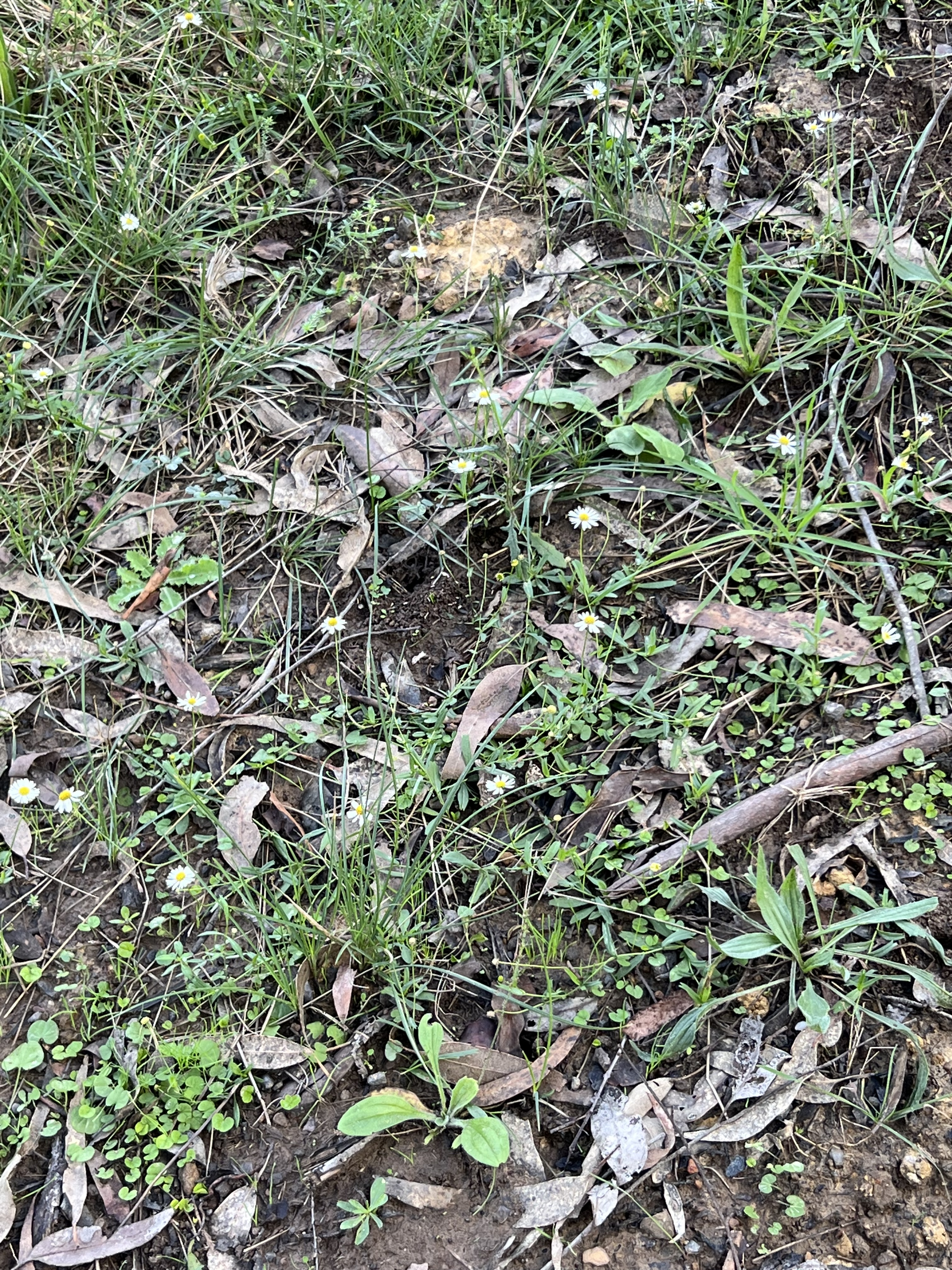
Habit

Brachyscome mittagongensis, is a flowering plant in the family Asteraceae and is endemic to New South Wales. It has white daisy-like flowers and a yellow centre.

== Description ==
Brachyscome mittagongensis is a perennial herb with ascending or horizontal branches up to 50 cm (20 in) long, mostly smooth except for occasional hairs. The leaves are variable, narrowly oblong or elliptic, oval-lance or lance-shaped, usually glabrous, arranged alternately, mostly sessile, 11–38 mm (0.43–1.50 in) long, 3.5–11 mm (0.14–0.43 in) wide, apex squared or three toothed. The flowers florets have about 40 white petals, 8.5 mm (0.33 in) long with four veins meeting at the apex, yellow centre disc contains about 80, 5 lobed florets. The bracts overlap and arranged in one row and five stamens. Flowering occurs from February to May and the fruit is an oval-shaped, flattened achene, 1.3–1.5 mm (0.051–0.059 in) long, warty and brown.

== Taxonomy and naming ==
Brachyscome mittagongensis was first formally described in 2009 by Philip Sydney Short and the description was published in Muelleria. The specific epithet (mittagongensis) is in reference to Mittagong the area of distribution of the species.

== Distribution and habitat ==
This species of brachyscome has a restricted distribution from Marulan to Berrima in New South Wales on roadsides, swamps and cleared grazing areas.
