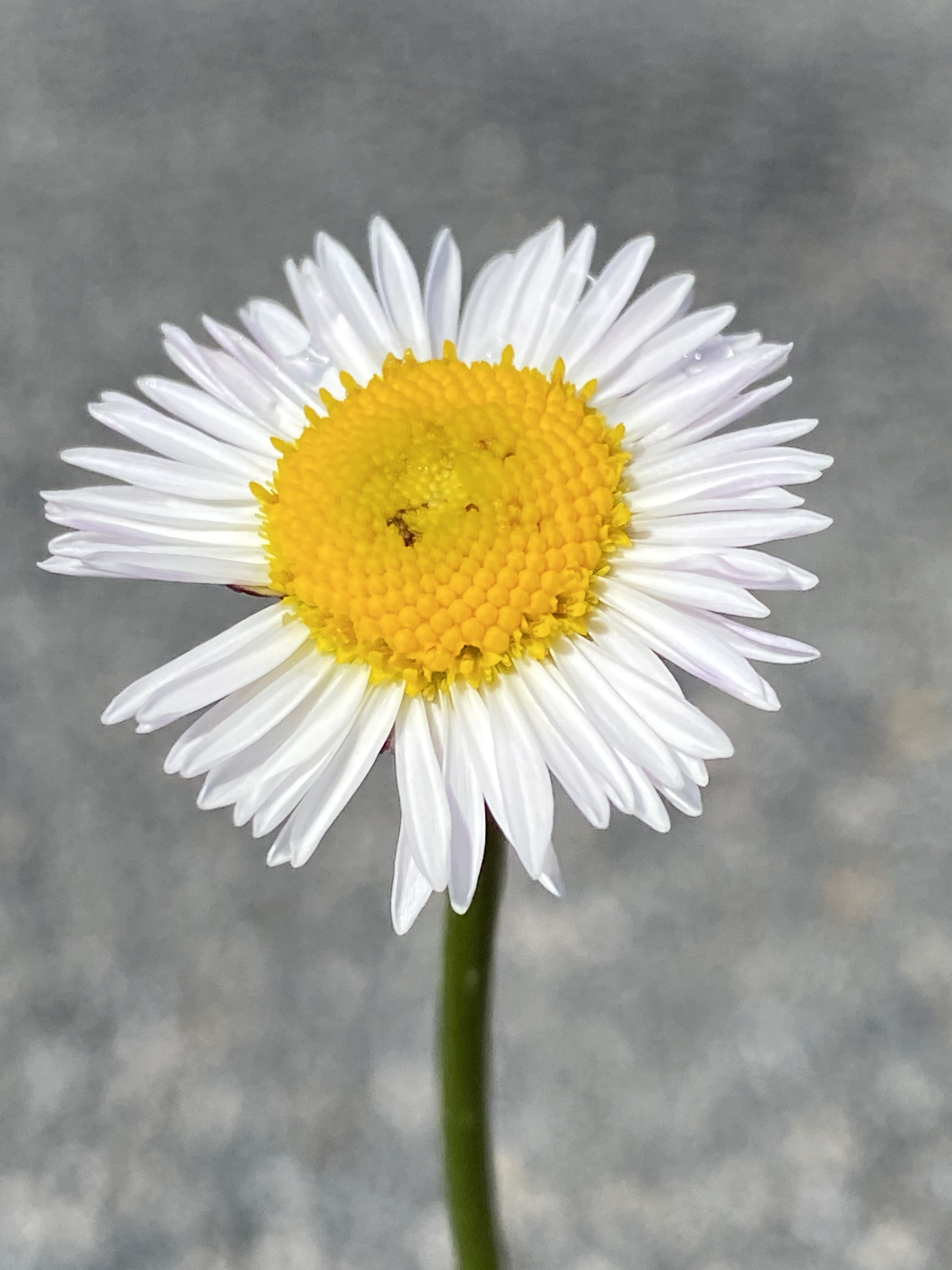

Scientific classification
- Kingdom: Plantae
- Clade: Tracheophytes
- Clade: Angiosperms
- Clade: Eudicots
- Clade: Asterids
- Order: Asterales
- Family: Asteraceae
- Genus: Brachyscome
- Species: B. nivalis

Binomial name
- Brachyscome nivalis F.Muell.

= Brachyscome nivalis =

Species of flowering plant

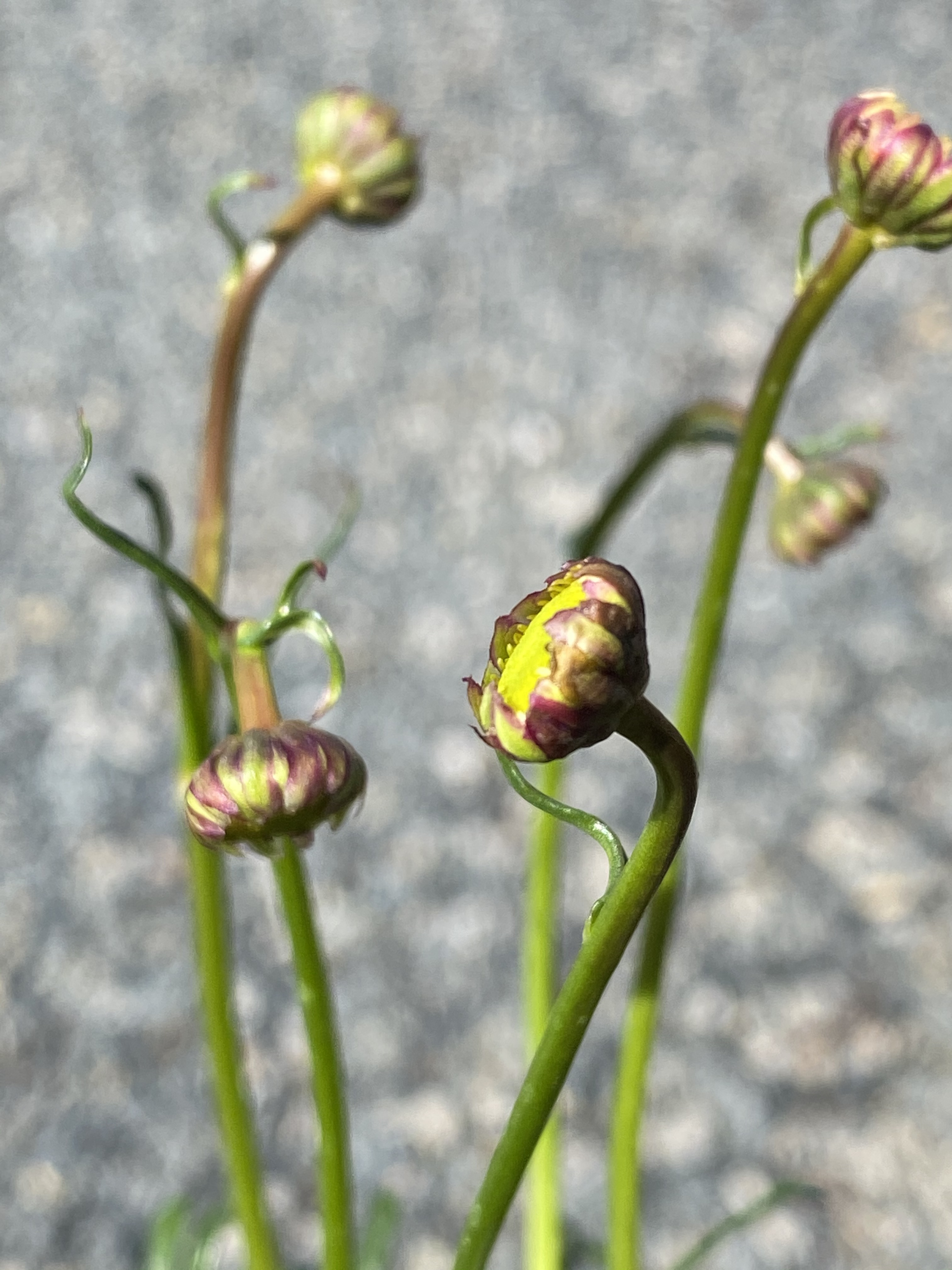
Flower buds

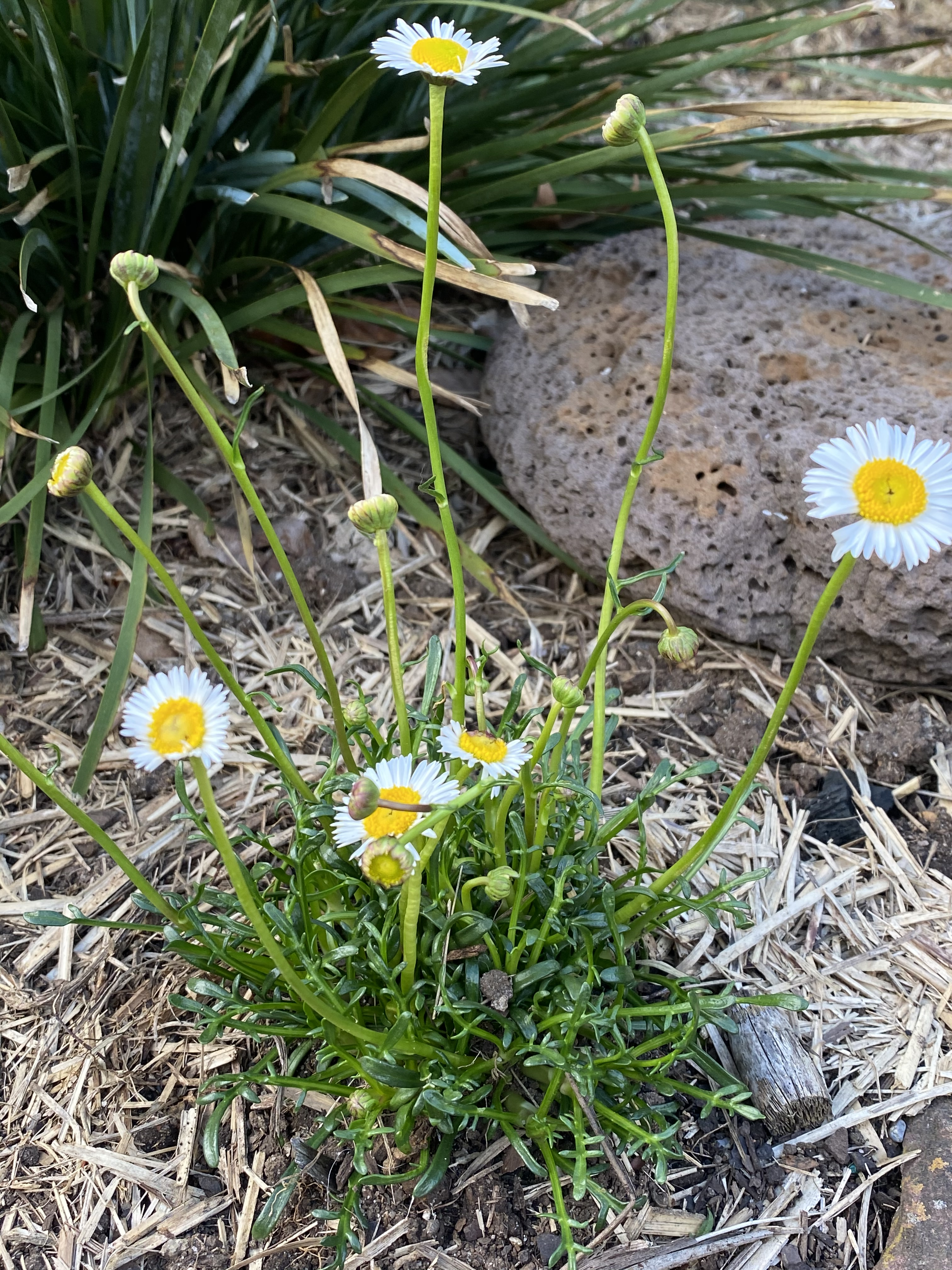
Habit

Brachyscome nivalis, commonly known as snow daisy, is a perennial herb in the family Asteraceae and is endemic to Australia. It has mostly white daisy-like flowers, yellow centres and deeply lobed leaves.

== Description ==
Brachyscome nivalis is a perennial herb with slender stems rising from the base of the plant to 30 cm (12 in) high. The leaves are arranged opposite, shiny, bright green, linear to broader at the apex and tapering to the stem, margins more or less entire to pinnatifid, up to 15 cm (5.9 in) long usually in a clump forming rosette. The white flowers are borne singly, 30–45 mm (1.2–1.8 in) in diameter on stems 6–25 cm (2.4–9.8 in) long, petals up to 12 mm (0.47 in) long with a bright yellow centre. The flower bracts are smooth, narrowly lance shaped with jagged edges. The brown, dry, one seeded fruit are wedge-shaped, flattened, 2–3 mm (0.079–0.118 in) long, covered with uneven hairs about 1 mm (0.039 in) long and are joined together in bunches. Flowering occurs from summer to early autumn, cultivated plants may flower in spring.

== Taxonomy ==
Brachyscome nivalis was first formally described in 1855 by Ferdinand von Mueller and the description was published in Definitions of rare or hitherto undescribed Australian plants.

== Distribution and habitat ==
The snow daisy grows in New South Wales at higher altitudes, and extending south from Mount Gingera in the Australian Capital Territory. In Victoria it is found growing in protected, rocky sites in the alps, sometimes in herb fields, grassland and woodlands.
