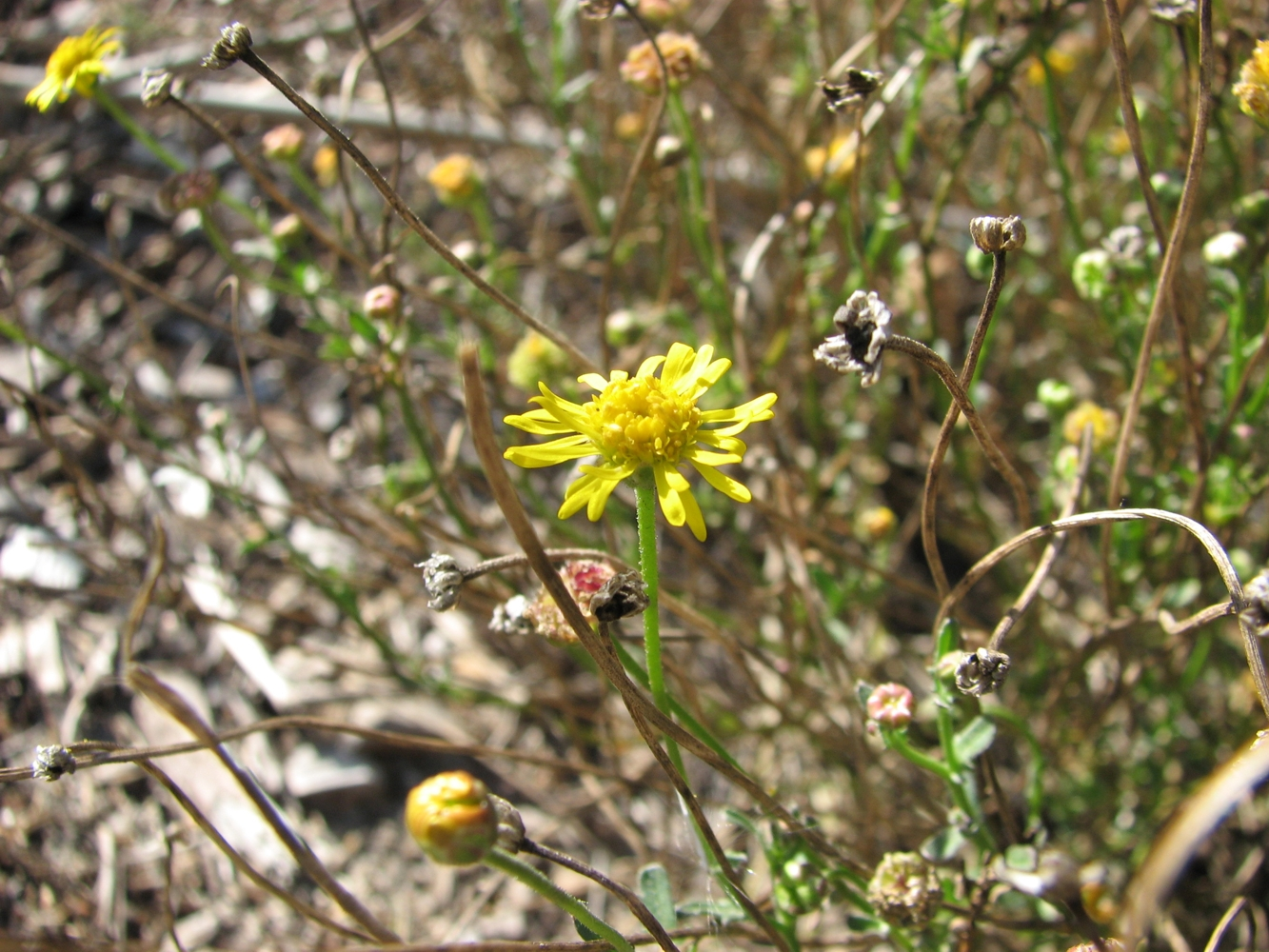

Scientific classification
- Kingdom: Plantae
- Clade: Embryophytes
- Clade: Tracheophytes
- Clade: Spermatophytes
- Clade: Angiosperms
- Clade: Eudicots
- Clade: Asterids
- Order: Asterales
- Family: Asteraceae
- Genus: Brachyscome
- Species: B. chrysoglossa

Binomial name
- Brachyscome chrysoglossa F.Muell.

Synonyms
- Brachyscome marginata var. chrysoglossa (F.Muell.) G.L.Davis

= Brachyscome chrysoglossa =

Yellow-tongue daisy

Species of flowering plant

Brachyscome chrysoglossa commonly known as yellow-tongue daisy, is a flowering plant in the family Asteraceae and is endemic to Australia. It is an upright perennial herb with yellow daisy-like flowers.

== Description ==
Brachyscome chrysoglossa is an upright, perennial herb 15–40 cm (5.9–15.7 in) high, smooth or with occasional hairs. The leaves are basal or borne on the stems, narrowly egg-shaped or elliptic, 1–11 cm (0.39–4.33 in) long, 2–18 mm (0.079–0.709 in) wide, smooth or hairy, entire or lobed. The 13-24 bracts are arranged in rows, about equal, mostly oval-shaped or elliptic, 2.5–6 mm (0.098–0.236 in) long, 0.7–3 mm (0.028–0.118 in) wide, green, sometimes with dry, purplish margins, smooth or with occasional hairs. Flowering from September to January and the fruit is an achene, obovate, 2.5–2.9 mm (0.098–0.114 in) long, 1.6–2.1 mm (0.063–0.083 in) wide, yellowish or light brown and hairy.

== Taxonomy and naming ==
The species was first formally described by botanist Ferdinand von Mueller, his description published in Transactions of the Philosophical Society of Victoria in 1855. The type was described as growing "in the Mallee scrub towards the north-western boundaries of the colony [Victoria]". The name has sometimes been misapplied to Brachyscome heterodonta.

== Distribution ==
Brachyscome chrysoglossa is locally common in New South Wales and Victoria where it occurs on clay soils which are subject to inundation.
