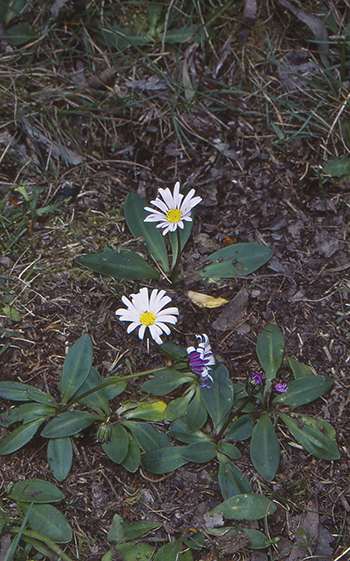

Scientific classification
- Kingdom: Plantae
- Clade: Tracheophytes
- Clade: Angiosperms
- Clade: Eudicots
- Clade: Asterids
- Order: Asterales
- Family: Asteraceae
- Genus: Brachyscome
- Species: B. decipiens

Binomial name
- Brachyscome decipiens Hook.f.

= Brachyscome decipiens =

Field daisy

Species of flowering plant

Brachyscome decipiens, commonly known as field daisy, is a perennial herb in the family Asteraceae and is endemic to Australia. It is a small herb with white or pale blue flowers.

== Description ==
Brachyscome decipiens is a herb with leaves that are whorled at the ground. The leaves are egg-shaped to narrowly elliptic, smooth, 2–19 cm (0.79–7.48 in) long, 5–37 mm (0.20–1.46 in) wide. The leaves from ground level are 10–30 cm (3.9–11.8 in) long and smooth. The leaf edges are smooth or toothed near the apex, surface smooth, sometimes purplish near the leaf base. The smooth flower bracts are arranged in two rows, lance or elliptic shape, 5.5–9 mm (0.22–0.35 in) long, 1.5–4 mm (0.059–0.157 in) wide with prominent glandular purple edges. The ligules about 5–11 mm (0.20–0.43 in) long, white on upper side occasionally mauve underneath. The white or pale blue flower heads are 12–18 mm (0.47–0.71 in) in diameter, the peduncle 8–20 cm (3.1–7.9 in) long, broad, smooth and the centre yellow. The brown one-seeded fruit are flattened lengthwise, egg-shaped, 2.3–4.6 mm (0.091–0.181 in) long and 1.2–1.7 mm (0.047–0.067 in) wide. Flowering occurs from September to March.

== Taxonomy and naming ==
Brachyscome decipiens was first formally described in 1847 by Joseph Dalton Hooker and the description was published in the London Journal of Botany. The specific epithet (decipiens) is derived from the Latin word decipio meaning "to beguile" or "to cheat".

== Distribution and habitat ==
Field daisy grows in subalpine and mountainous woodland and swamps in Victoria, Tasmania and New South Wales.
