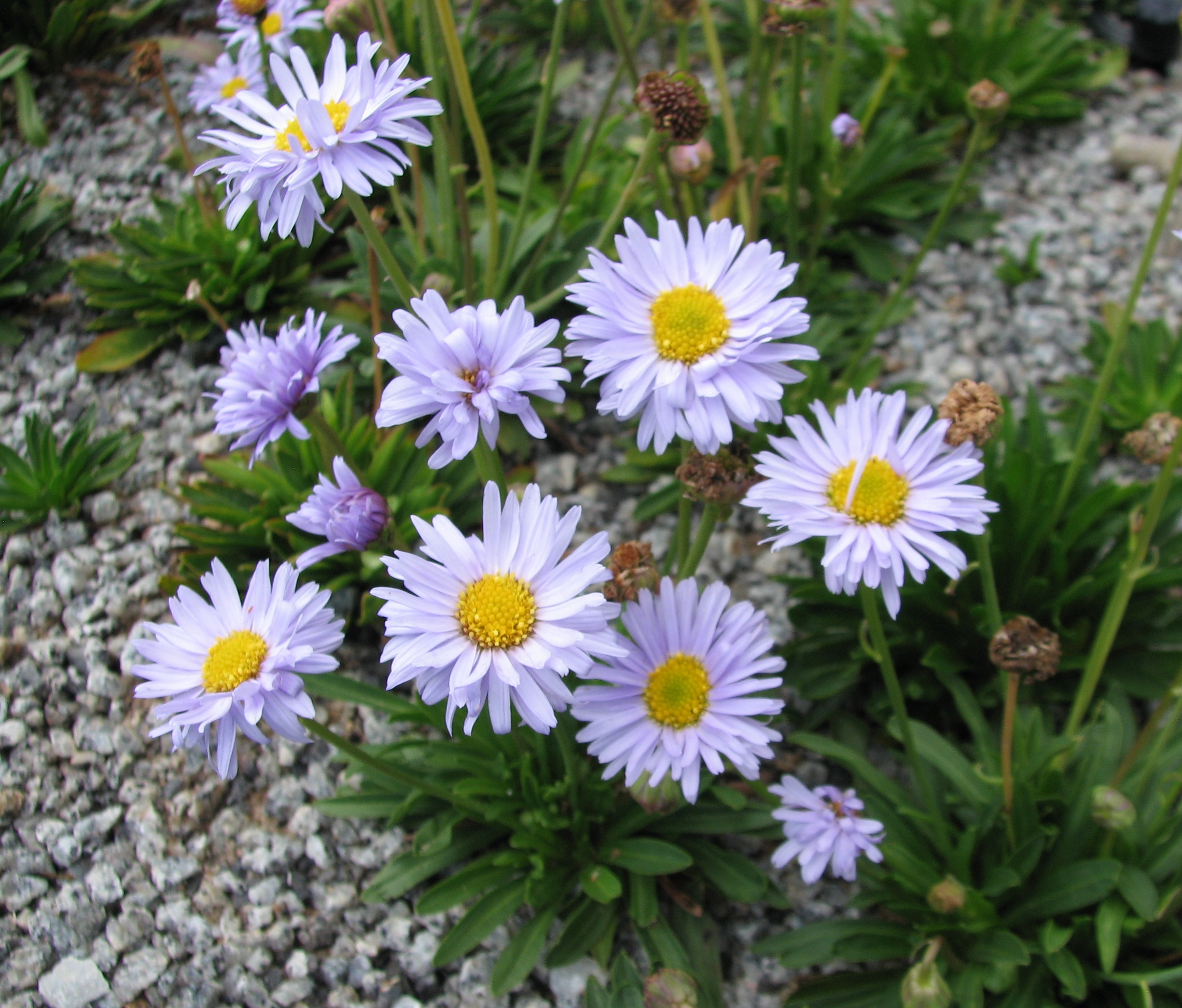

Scientific classification
- Kingdom: Plantae
- Clade: Embryophytes
- Clade: Tracheophytes
- Clade: Spermatophytes
- Clade: Angiosperms
- Clade: Eudicots
- Clade: Asterids
- Order: Asterales
- Family: Asteraceae
- Genus: Brachyscome
- Species: B. scapigera

Binomial name
- Brachyscome scapigera (Sieber ex Spreng.) DC.

Synonyms
- Senecio scapiger

= Brachyscome scapigera =

Tufted daisy

Species of flowering plant

Brachyscome scapigera commonly known as tufted daisy, is a flowering, perennial herb in the family Asteraceae. It has white or mauve daisy-like flowers and is endemic to south-eastern Australia.

== Description ==
Brachyscome scapigera is an upright, perennial herb to 40 cm (16 in) high. The basal leaves are linear to oblanceolate and up to 20 cm (7.9 in) long and 15 mm (0.59 in) wide, margins entire and the apex pointed. The flowerheads are borne singly, about 12 mm (0.47 in) in diameter with yellow centres and white or mauve petals, peduncle 8.5–23 cm (3.3–9.1 in) long, often with one or two smaller leaves. Flowering occurs between November and March and the fruit is a swollen, smooth, ribbed cypsela.

== Taxonomy and naming ==
In 1826 this species was given the name Senecio scapigera by Franz Sieber from an unpublished description by Curt Polycarp Joachim Sprengel. In 1838 Augustin Pyramus de Candolle changed the name to Brachyscome scapigera and the description was published in Prodromus Systematis Naturalis Regni Vegetabilis. The specific epithet (scapigera) refers to the shape of the flower stalk.

== Distribution ==
Brachyscome scapigera frequently occurs in swampy areas in forests in Queensland, New South Wales the Australian Capital Territory and Victoria. In the latter state it occurs at altitudes above 600 metres and is associated with Eucalyptus pauciflora.
