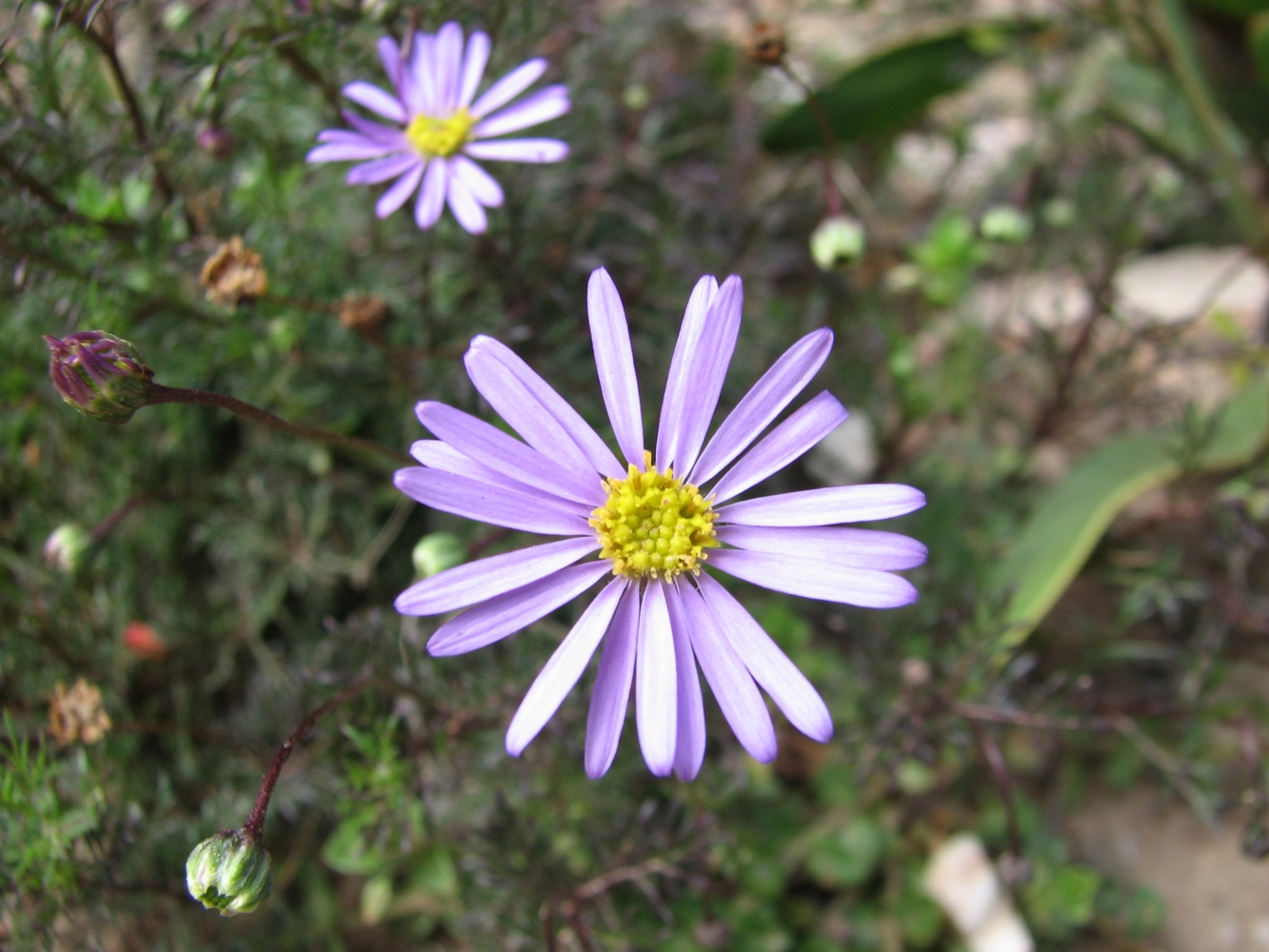

Scientific classification
- Kingdom: Plantae
- Clade: Tracheophytes
- Clade: Angiosperms
- Clade: Eudicots
- Clade: Asterids
- Order: Asterales
- Family: Asteraceae
- Genus: Brachyscome
- Species: B. multifida

Binomial name
- Brachyscome multifida DC.

Synonyms
- Brachyscome marginata var. multifida (F.Muell.) G.L.Davis

= Brachyscome multifida =

Cut-leaved daisy

Species of flowering plant

Brachyscome multifida commonly known as cut-leaved daisy, rocky daisy, and Hawkesbury daisy,is flowering plant in the family Asteraceae. It has white, mauve or pink flowers and is endemic to Australia.

== Description ==
Brachyscome multifida is an ascending, smooth annual to 45 cm (18 in) high. The leaves are fine and deeply divided, 7 cm (2.8 in) long and 7-10 lobes 35 mm (1.4 in) long. . The flowerheads mauve, pink or white about 4 mm (0.16 in) in diameter, peduncle 4–14 cm (1.6–5.5 in) long, and to 40 cm long peduncles. The ray florets are mauve, pink or white and are 7 to 10 mm long. The main flowerering season is early autumn to mid winter, but the daisy-like flowerheads may appear throughout the year. Flowering occurs from March to June and the fruit is a wedge-shaped achene, brown to black, swollen, 1.9–2.4 mm (0.075–0.094 in) long, smooth and warty.

== Taxonomy and naming ==
The species was first formally described by Swiss botanist Augustin Pyramus de Candolle, his description published in the 5th volume of Prodromus Systematis Naturalis Regni Vegetabilis in 1836. A collection was made by Allan Cunningham from Peel's Range (now Cocoparra Range) in New South Wales. The specific epithet (multifida) means divided into many parts.

Two varieties are recognised:

- Brachyscome multifida var dilitata Benth - oblanceolate to cuneate leaf lobes
- Brachyscome multifida var multifida- narrow-linear to subulate leaf lobes

== Distribution ==
Brachyscome multifida occurs on dry, shallow or rocky soils in sclerophyll forest or grassland in Victoria, New South Wales and Queensland.

== Cultivation ==
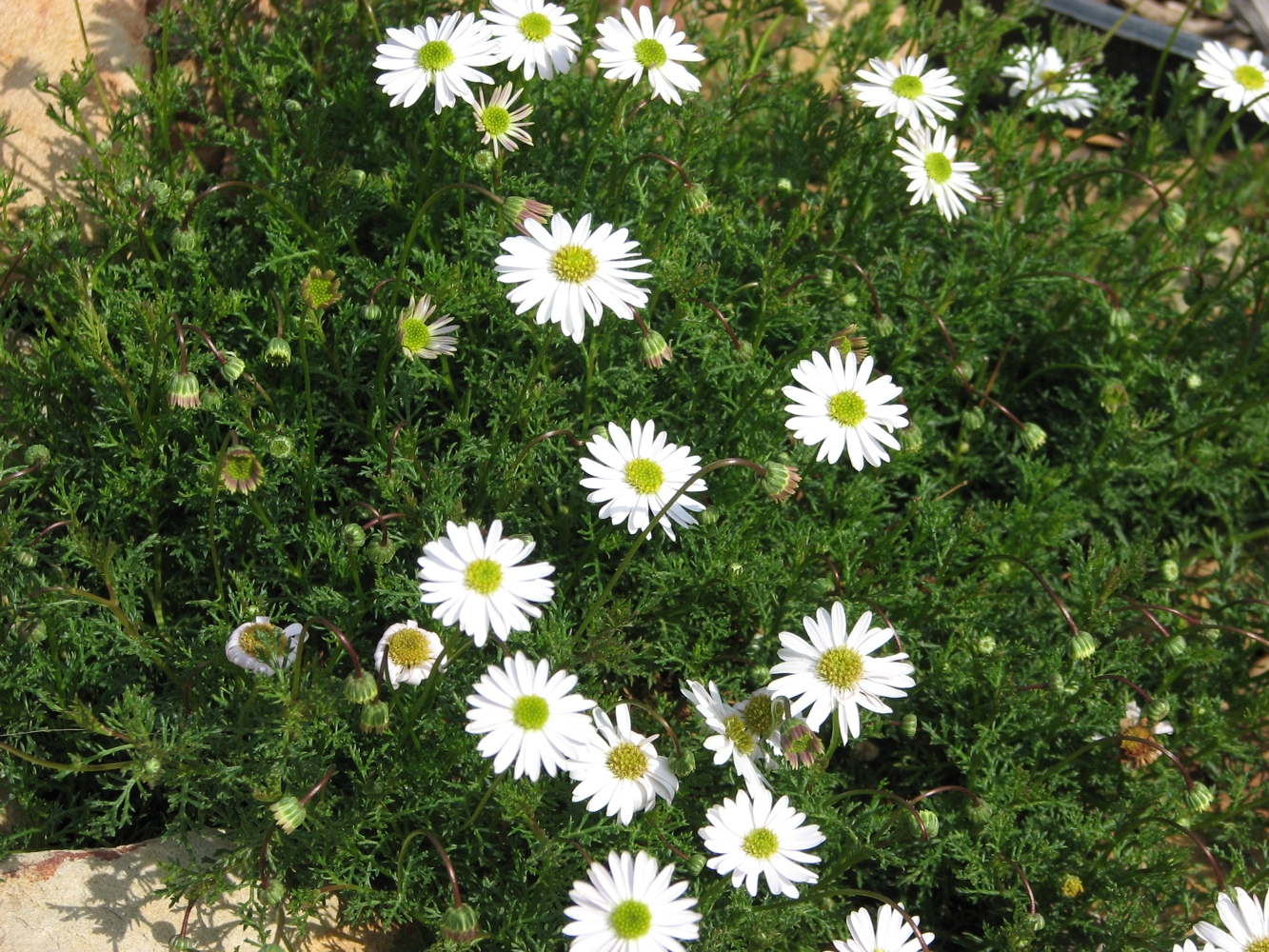
Brachyscome multifida 'White Delight'

The species and its cultivars are popular in horticulture, and are used for mass plantings, in hanging baskets, in borders and spilling over retaining walls. They can be grown in a wide range of soils and tolerates dry conditions, but will benefit from supplementary watering. Plants are best situated in a position with full sun, although partial shade is tolerated. Although relatively frost tolerant, foliage may burn. The plant is readily propagated by cuttings which strike readily. Plants may also be propagated by layering or from seed, though germination rate is usually poor.
