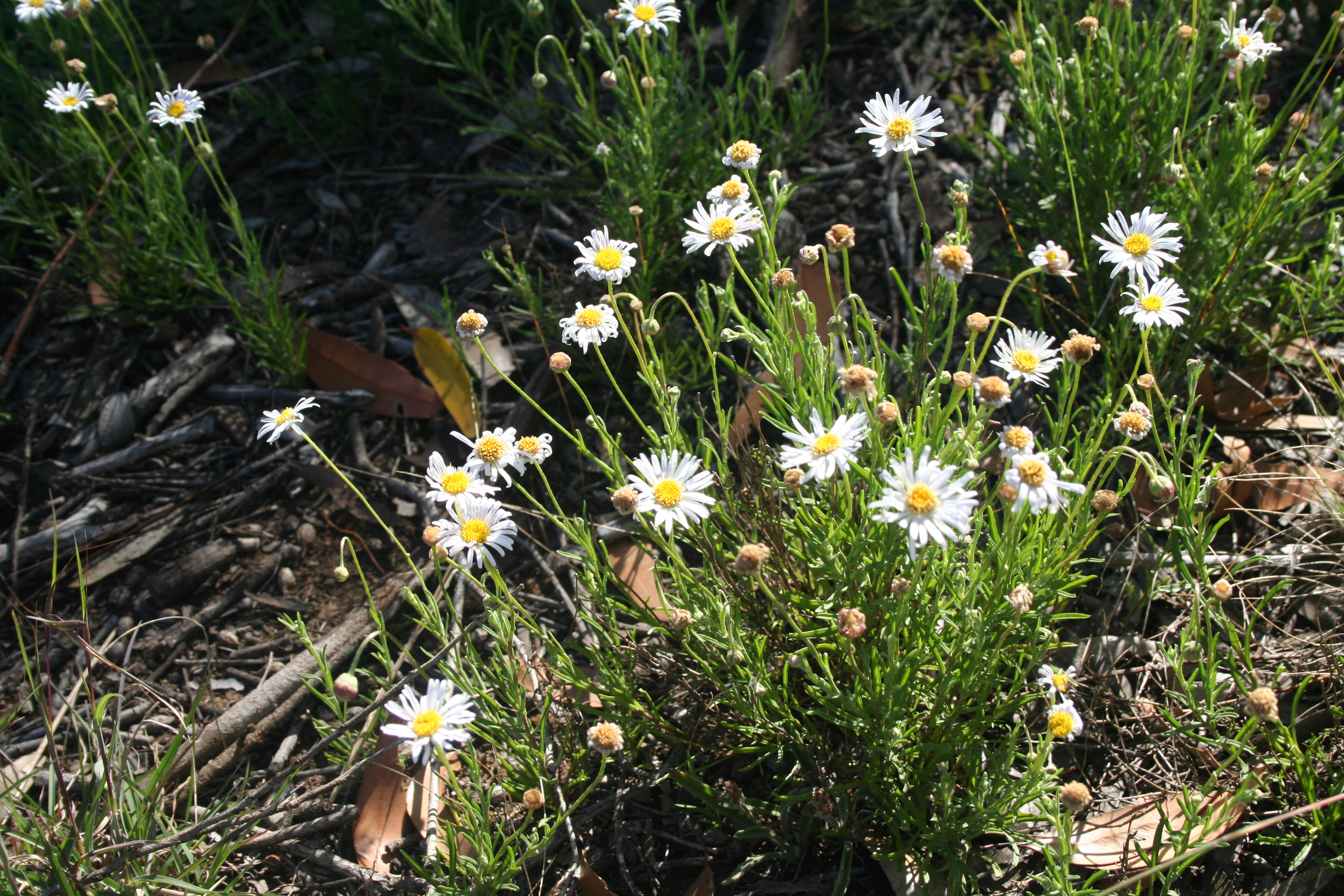

Scientific classification
- Kingdom: Plantae
- Clade: Embryophytes
- Clade: Tracheophytes
- Clade: Spermatophytes
- Clade: Angiosperms
- Clade: Eudicots
- Clade: Asterids
- Order: Asterales
- Family: Asteraceae
- Genus: Brachyscome
- Species: B. dentata

Binomial name
- Brachyscome dentata Gaudich.

= Brachyscome dentata =

Species of flowering plant

Brachyscome dentata, commonly known as lobe-seed daisy, is a tufted perennial herb in the family Asteraceae and is endemic to Australia. It has mostly white or mauve daisy-like flowers, a yellow centre and pale green leaves. It is endemic to Australia.

== Description ==
Brachyscome dentata is an upright, perennial herb with branches up to 50 cm (20 in) high with leafy stems. The leaves and stems may have occasional to thickly covered woolly hairs. The lower leaves wither quickly, the upper leaves wedge shaped, mostly 2–5 cm (0.79–1.97 in) long, 2–10 mm (0.079–0.394 in) wide, 3 narrow, sharp lobes at the apex, sometimes deep margins or entire without a stalk. The single, white or occasionally mauve flowers are about 10 mm (0.39 in) in diameter on a peduncle 8–25 cm (3.1–9.8 in) long. The overlapping bracts lance-shaped, rounded or sharply pointed and jagged. The fruit is brown, dry, wedge shaped, flattened and 3–4 mm (0.12–0.16 in) long covered in short bristles. Flowering occurs in spring and summer.

== Taxonomy and naming ==
The species was first formally described in 1830 by Charles Gaudichaud-Beaupré and the description was published in Voyage Autour du Monde ... sur les Corvettes de S.M. l'Uranie et la Physicienne. Botanique. The specific epithet (dentata) is derived from the Latin dentatus meaning "toothed" with reference to the toothed margins.

== Distribution and habitat ==
In Victoria it grows in southern districts to Geelong, east to Barnawartha and west to Wimmera, growing in a variety of habitats including grasslands on basalt, sandy loam in woodlands and heavy clay. In New South Wales it is a widespread species throughout the state in a variety of habitats, usually in floodplains. In Queensland it is found growing in the Darling Downs.
