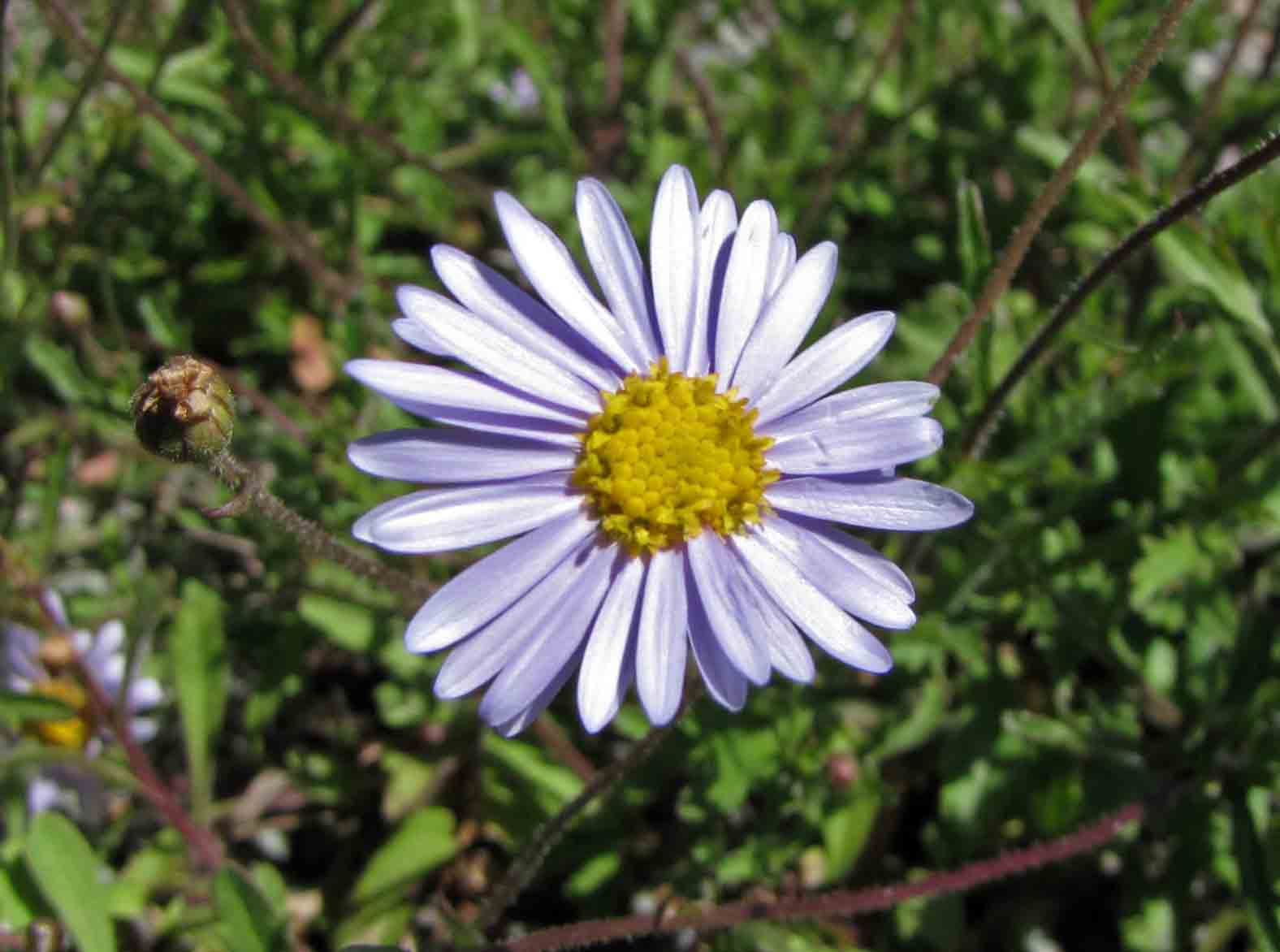

Scientific classification
- Kingdom: Plantae
- Clade: Tracheophytes
- Clade: Angiosperms
- Clade: Eudicots
- Clade: Asterids
- Order: Asterales
- Family: Asteraceae
- Genus: Brachyscome
- Species: B. ascendens

Binomial name
- Brachyscome ascendens G.L.Davis

= Brachyscome ascendens =

Border Ranges daisy

Species of flowering plant

Brachyscome ascendens, the Border Ranges daisy, is a species of flowering plant in the family Asteraceae and is endemic to Australia. It has mostly mauve daisy-like flowers and a yellow centre.

== Description ==
Brachyscome ascendens is a herbaceous perennial with slender stems rising from the base of the plant or upper leaves. The branches are trailing and slightly ascending about 35 cm (14 in) long with glandular hairs. The leaves grow from the base and along the stems, usually lance-shaped, broader at the apex, 7–40 mm (0.28–1.57 in) long, 2–12 mm (0.079–0.472 in) wide and leaf edges usually lobed or toothed. The leaves decrease in size toward the end of the branch, usually with fewer lobes. The uppermost leaves often with smooth margins, lance or narrow shaped. The flower petals are 8–10 mm (0.31–0.39 in) long, mauve or lilac and the centre yellow. The 12-18 overlapping flower bracts are 7–11 mm (0.28–0.43 in) in diameter, elliptic or egg-shaped, rounded at the tip, 3.5–4.6 mm (0.14–0.18 in) long, 1–2.2 mm (0.039–0.087 in) wide with prominent dry and thin edges. The thin, brown dry fruit are 1.9–2.3 mm (0.075–0.091 in) long, flat, egg-shaped with prominent small warty protuberances on the surface. Flowering occurs April, October and December.

== Taxonomy and naming ==
Brachyscome ascendens was first formally described in 1948 by Gwenda Davis and the description was published in Proceedings of the Linnean Society of New South Wales. The specific epithet ascendens is derived from the Latin word ascendo meaning "mount", "climb", "rise" or "grow".

== Distribution and habitat ==
Border ranges daisy grows in forests or woodland on rocky basalt slopes from the McPherson Range area and to the east near the New South Wales and Queensland border.

== Conservation status ==
Brachyscome ascendens is classified as endangered in New South Wales.
