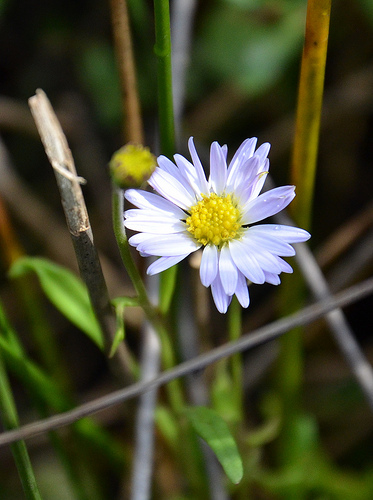

Scientific classification
- Kingdom: Plantae
- Clade: Tracheophytes
- Clade: Angiosperms
- Clade: Eudicots
- Clade: Asterids
- Order: Asterales
- Family: Asteraceae
- Genus: Brachyscome
- Species: B. graminea

Binomial name
- Brachyscome graminea (Labill.) F.Muell.

= Brachyscome graminea =

Species of flowering plant

Brachyscome graminea, commonly known as grass daisy, is a perennial herb in the family Asteraceae and is endemic to Australia. It has mostly mauve-pink or purple daisy-like flowers and a yellow centre.

== Description ==
Brachyscome graminea is a perennial herb with slender stems rising from the base of the plant or upper leaves. The branches are weak, trailing, about 70 cm (28 in) long, either smooth or variably with fine soft glandular hairs. The leaves grow from the base and along the stems, mostly narrow egg-shaped or more linear, 2–16 cm (0.79–6.30 in) long, 0.1–1 cm (0.039–0.394 in) wide, sharply pointed without a stalk. The leaf edges entire, sometimes fleshy, smooth or with scattered hairs. The flower petals are 8–10 mm (0.31–0.39 in) long, white or mauve, flower head 8–17 mm (0.31–0.67 in) in diameter and the centre yellow. The 15-20 overlapping flower bracts are narrowly elliptic, green, barely toothed and rounded at the tip. The brown fruit are egg-shaped, sticky and 1.6–2.4 mm (0.063–0.094 in) long. Flowering occurs from October to May.

== Taxonomy and naming ==
Brachyscome graminea was first formally described in 1858 by Ferdinand Von Mueller and the description was published in Fragmenta Phytographiae Australiae The specific epithet (graminea) is a Latin word meaning "grassy" or "of grass".

== Distribution and habitat ==
In New South Wales grass daisy is a widespread species growing in coastal districts in wet locations, cliff edges and at higher altitudes in freshwater swamps and streams. In Victoria it grows widespread over much of the State in salt laden coastal marshes in the Glenelg River area to Mallacoota. At higher altitudes in freshwater swamps and streams near Benambra and Omeo.
