= Christian Friedrich Lessing =

German botanist (1809–1862)

Christian Friedrich Lessing (10 August 1809 – 13 March 1862) was a German botanist who was a native of Groß Wartenberg, Niederschlesien. He was a brother to painter Carl Friedrich Lessing (1808–1880), and a grandnephew of poet Gotthold Ephraim Lessing (1729–1781).

Lessing was a botanical authority on the plant family Asteraceae, and in 1832 published an influential treatise on Asteraceae called Synopsis generum Compositarum. He performed extensive botanical research in Siberia. In 1862 he was buried in Trinity Cemetery, in the Siberian city of Krasnoyarsk.

The plant genus Lessingia from the family Asteraceae is named in honor of Christian Friedrich, Karl Friedrich and Gotthold Ephraim Lessing.

== Selected publications ==
- Reise durch Norwegen nach den Loffoden durch Lappland und Schweden, 1831
- Synopsis generum Compositarum, earumque dispositionis novae tentamen, monographiis multarum Capensium interjectis, 1832
