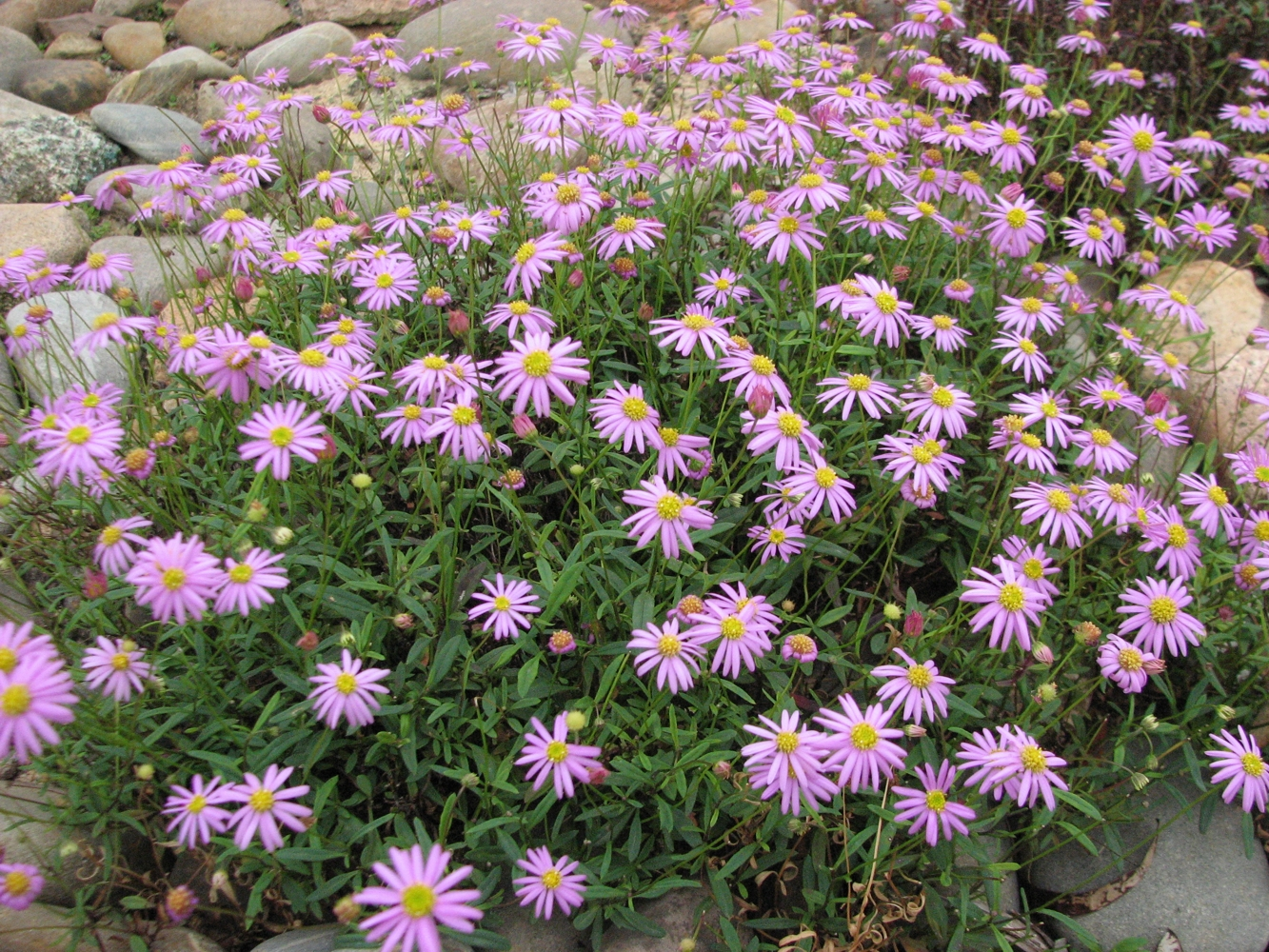
- Brachyscome graminea

Scientific classification
- Kingdom: Plantae
- Clade: Tracheophytes
- Clade: Angiosperms
- Clade: Eudicots
- Clade: Asterids
- Order: Asterales
- Family: Asteraceae
- Subfamily: Asteroideae
- Tribe: Astereae
- Subtribe: Brachyscominae
- Genus: Brachyscome; Cass.

Species
- See List of Brachyscome species

= Brachyscome =

Genus of flowering plants

Brachyscome is a genus of flowering plants in the family Asteraceae. Most are endemic to Australia, and a few occur in New Zealand and New Guinea.

== Name ==
The genus name is spelled Brachycome by some authors. Henri Cassini published the name Brachyscome in 1816, forming it from the classical Greek brachys ("short") and kome ("hair"), a reference to the very short pappus bristles. Because the combining form of brachys in Greek compound words is brachy-, Cassini later corrected the spelling to Brachycome. Australian taxonomists still debate whether Cassini's corrected spelling is admissible under the rules of botanical nomenclature. A proposal to conserve Brachycome was rejected in 1993 by the Committee for Spermatophyta.

== Genetics ==
One of the annual plains species, Brachyscome dichromosomatica, is remarkable for its low chromosome count. In this species n=2, though some plants have 1, 2 or 3 additional large B chromosomes. The genus has an unusually large range of chromosome counts, from n=2 to n=18.

== Description ==
These are annual and perennial herbs and small shrubs. Species have a basal rosette of leaves and/or leaves alternately arranged on the stem. The blades are entire or divided. The flower heads are solitary or borne in small corymbs. The head has a row of ray florets in shades of white, blue, pink, or mauve, and yellow disc florets.

=== Fruit ===
The genus is distinguished from other genera in tribe Astereae mainly by the structure of the fruit. These achenes or cypselas are roughly club-shaped but usually incurved and flattened. They often have a membranous rim or wing around the edge that is sometimes wavy or fringed. The pappus is less than one millimeter long in most species.

== Habitat ==
Brachyscome species are found in a wide range of habitats. They occupy rainy coastal and mountainous regions as well as dry central Australia.

== Cultivation ==
Some Brachyscome species, notably Brachyscome iberidifolia (Swan river daisy), are popular as easily cultivated ornamental plants for flower gardens, and many cultivars are bred for their form, foliage, and flowers.

== Species ==
There are between 65 and 80 species in the genus.

Species include:

- Brachyscome aculeata – hill daisy
- Brachyscome ascendens
- Brachyscome basaltica – swamp daisy
- Brachyscome chrysoglossa - yellow-tongue daisy
- Brachyscome ciliaris - variable daisy
- Brachyscome decipiens – field daisy
- Brachyscome dentata
- Brachyscome graminea - stiff daisy, grassland daisy
- Brachyscome iberidifolia - Swan River daisy
- Brachyscome mittagongensis
- Brachyscome multifida - cut-leaved daisy, rock daisy, Hawkesbury daisy
- Brachyscome nivalis – snow daisy
- Brachyscome scapigera - tufted daisy
- Brachyscome segmentosa - Lord Howe daisy, mountain daisy
