= Flora of the Houtman Abrolhos =

This is a list of the terrestrial flora of the Houtman Abrolhos. Only vascular plants are listed — there have been some collections of mosses, liverworts and lichens from the Houtman Abrolhos, but no information has been published on these non-vascular groups.

The distribution of each species within each island group is provided. A list of islands is provided for species that occur on fewer than ten islands in a group; for species that occur on ten or more islands in a group, an island count is provided. Islands without a formally gazetted name are referred to by informal names, given in quotation marks.

A grey background indicates a naturalised species.

Scientific name	Common name	Distribution			Remarks	Image
Scientific name	Common name	Wallabi Group (45 islands)	Easter Group (34 islands)	Pelsaert Group (41 islands)	Remarks	Image
== Aizoaceae ==
Carpobrotus sp.			Rat I.			
Carpobrotus virescens	Coastal Pigface	13 islands	25 islands	23 islands		
Disphyma crassifolium subsp. clavellatum	Round-leaved Pigface	Pigeon I.	Leo I., Rat I.			
Mesembryanthemum crystallinum	Iceplant	40 islands	18 islands	30 islands	Naturalised	
Sesuvium portulacastrum			Campbell I.			
Tetragonia decumbens	Sea Spinach		Crake I., Keru I., White I., Wooded I.		Naturalised	
== Amaranthaceae ==
Ptilotus divaricatus	Climbing Mulla Mulla	East Wallabi I.				
Ptilotus eriotrichus		East Wallabi I., West Wallabi I.				
Ptilotus gaudichaudii		East Wallabi I.	Serventy I.			
Ptilotus obovatus	Cotton Bush	East Wallabi I.				
Ptilotus villosiflorus		West Wallabi I.				
== Anthericaceae ==
Thysanotus patersonii		East Wallabi I., North I., Pigeon I., Seagull I., West Wallabi I.				
== Apiaceae ==
Apium annuum		East Wallabi I., West Wallabi I.	Alexander I., Campbell I., Serventy I.			
Apium prostratum	Sea Celery	Tattler I.		Middle I.		
Daucus glochidiatus	Australian Carrot	East Wallabi I., North I., Pigeon I., West Wallabi I.	Campbell I., Keru I., White I.	Middle I.		
Hydrocotyle diantha		East Wallabi I., West Wallabi I.	Rat I.	Basile I., Middle I.		
Petroselinum crispum	Parsley		Little Rat I., Rat I., Roma I.		Naturalised	
Trachymene pilosa	Native Parsnip	East Wallabi I.				
== Apocynaceae ==
Alyxia buxifolia	Dysentery Bush	East Wallabi I., Seagull I. and West Wallabi I.				
== Asclepiadaceae ==
Sarcostemma viminale subsp. australe		"Eagle Point Islet", East Wallabi I., Oystercatcher I., Pigeon I., Seagull I. and West Wallabi I.		Basile I., Middle I.		
== Asphodelaceae ==
Bulbine semibarbata	Leek Lily	"Eagle Point Islet", East Wallabi I., Little Pigeon I., North I., Pigeon I. and West Wallabi I.	Rat I.	Middle I., Pelsaert I.		
== Asteraceae ==
Actinobole condensatum		East Wallabi I., North I., West Wallabi I.				
Actites megalocarpa	Dune Thistle	Little Pigeon I., Long I., Oystercatcher I., Pigeon I., Seagull I.		Pelsaert I.		
Angianthus tomentosus	Camel-grass	East Wallabi I.				
Brachyscome ciliaris		East Wallabi I., North I., Pigeon I.	Little Rat I.			
Brachyscome iberidifolia		East Wallabi I.				
Calocephalus aervoides	Woolly Beauty-heads	East Wallabi I., West Wallabi I.			Rated "Priority Three - Poorly Known Taxa" in the Department of Environment and Conservation's Declared Rare and Priority Flora List.	
Chthonocephalus tomentellus		West Wallabi I.			Rated "Priority Two - Poorly Known Taxa" in the Department of Environment and Conservation's Declared Rare and Priority Flora List.	
Conyza bonariensis	Flaxleaf Fleabane	Little Pigeon I., Pigeon I.	Bushby I., Little Rat I., Rat I., Roma I.		Naturalised	
Conyza sumatrensis	Tall Fleabane		Rat I.		Naturalised. Harvey et al. (2001) lists C. albida, but this is now a taxonomic synonym of C. sumatrensis.	
Erigeron karvinskianus				Gun I., Murray I.	Naturalised	
Euchiton sphaericus		East Wallabi I., North I.	Rat I.			
Gnaphalium indutum	Tiny Cudweed	East Wallabi I.	Leo I.			
Helichrysum luteoalbum	Jersey Cudweed	East Wallabi I., North I., Turnstone I., West Wallabi I.	Little Rat I., Rat I.		Naturalised. Harvey et al. (2001) lists Pseudognaphalium luteoalbum, but this is now a nomenclatural synonym of Helichrysum luteoalbum.	
Hypochaeris glabra	Smooth Catsear			Basile I.	Naturalised	
Lactuca saligna	Wild Lettuce	Pigeon I.			Naturalised	
Olearia axillaris	Coastal Daisybush	Eastern I., East Wallabi I., Long I., North I., Pigeon I., Turnstone I., West Wallabi I.	Campbell I.			
Podotheca angustifolia	Sticky Longheads	North I., West Wallabi I.				
Reichardia tingitana	False Sowthistle		Campbell I., Rat I.	Basile I., Middle I.	Naturalised	
Senecio glossanthus	Slender Groundsel	East Wallabi I., North I., West Wallabi I.				
Senecio pinnatifolius		23 islands	17 islands	16 islands	Harvey et al. (2001) lists S. lautus but this name has been misapplied in Western Australia to S. pinnatifolius.	
Sonchus oleraceus	Common Sowthistle	20 islands	19 islands	16 islands	Naturalised. Harvey et al. (2001) lists both S. oleraceus and S. tenerrimus on four islands, and S. tenerrimus alone on another. However, the latter name is now considered a misapplication against the former in Western Australia, so here the entries for these names have been pooled.	
Urospermum picroides	False Hawkbit	10 islands	10 islands	Burnett Rock, Burton I., Gun I., Post Office I., Uncle Margie I.	Naturalised	
Ursinia anthemoides	Ursinia		Alexander I., Leo I., Serventy I., White I.	Burnett Rock, Burton I.	Naturalised.	
Vittadinia cuneata var. cuneata	Woolly Vittadinia	Akerstrom I., Barge Rock, East Wallabi I., Marinula I., Seagull I., Turnstone I.				
Vittadinia sp.		East Wallabi I.				
== Avicenniaceae ==
Avicennia marina	White mangrove	Akerstrom I., "East Mangrove I.", Marinula I., Oystercatcher I., Seagull I., Tattler I., Turnstone I., West Wallabi I.	Alexander I., Campbell I., Keru I., Little Rat I., "Little Stokes I.", Morley I., Serventy I., Suomi I., Wooded I.	14 islands		
== Boraginaceae ==
Cynoglossum australe	Australian Hound's-tongue	East Wallabi I., West Wallabi I.			Harvey et al. (2001) lists this species, but according to FloraBase it does not occur in Western Australia.	
Echium plantagineum	Paterson's Curse	East Wallabi I.			Naturalised; classed as a noxious weed.	
Trichodesma zeylanicum	Camel Bush	North I.				
== Brassicaceae ==
Brassica rapa		Beacon I.			Naturalised	
Cakile maritima	Sea Rocket	10 islands	13 islands	12 islands	Naturalised	
Hornungia procumbens	Oval Purse	14 islands	Bynoe I., Leo I., Morley I., Serventy I.	Burton I., Pelsaert I.	Naturalised. Harvey et al. (2001) lists Hornungia procumbens on 13 islands, and Hymenolobus procumbens on another, but the latter name is now considered a synonym of the former.	
Lepidium lyratogynum		Eastern I.	Bynoe I., Leo I., Little North I., White I.			
Lepidium pseudoruderale		Beacon I., Dakin I., Dick I., Eastern I., Saville-Kent I., Seal I.		Burnett Rock, Burton I., Coronation I., Jackson I., "Little Jackson I.", Newman I., Pelsaert I., Post Office I., Square I.		
Lepidium puberulum		Eastern I., "First Sister Islet"	10 islands		Rated "Priority Four — Rare Taxa" in the Department of Environment and Conservation's system of Declared Rare and Priority Flora List.	
Raphanus raphanistrum	Wild radish	Pigeon I.	Alexander I., Little Rat I., Rat I., Serventy I.	Basile I., Gun I., Murray I., Pelsaert I., Post Office I.	Naturalised	
Raphanus sativus	Radish		Alexander I.	Basile I., Burnett Rock	Naturalised	
Sisymbrium irio	London Rocket		Suomi I.		Naturalised	
Sisymbrium orientale	Indian Hedge Mustard	Beacon I.	Little Rat I., Rat I.	Burnett Rock	Naturalised	
== Cactaceae ==
Opuntia stricta	Common Prickly Pear		Rat I.	Basile I.	Naturalised	
== Campanulaceae ==
Wahlenbergia gracilis			Rat I.			
Wahlenbergia multicaulis			Rat I.			
== Capparaceae ==
Capparis spinosa	Coastal Caper	"Eagle Point Islet", East Wallabi I., Little Pigeon I., Oystercatcher I., Pigeon I., Seagull I., Tattler I., Turnstone I., West Wallabi I.				
== Caryophyllaceae ==
Cerastium glomeratum	Mouse Ear Chickweed			Eight I., Three I.	Naturalised	
Petrorhagia dubia	Velvet Pink		Rat I.		Naturalised. Harvey et al. (2001) lists P. velutina, but this is now a taxonomic synonym of P. dubia.	
Polycarpon tetraphyllum	Fourleaf Allseed	East Wallabi I., Little Pigeon I., Pigeon I.	Little Roma I.	Basile I., Jackson I.	Naturalised	
Sagina apetala	Annual Pearlwort	East Wallabi I.			Naturalised	
Silene gallica	French Catchfly		White I.		Naturalised	
Silene nocturna	Mediterranean Catchfly		Alexander I., Bynoe I., Little Rat I., Morley I., Serventy I.		Naturalised	
Spergularia diandra	Lesser Sand Spurry			Gun I.	Naturalised	
Spergularia rubra	Sand Spurry	12 islands	Little Rat I., Roma I.	Pelsaert I., Three I.	Naturalised	
Spergularia sp. 5 Leeman			Rat I.		Harvey et al. (2001) lists S. nesophila, but this is an unpublished manuscript name, which is considered a nomenclatural synonym of the above.	
Stellaria media	Chickweed	West Wallabi I.			Naturalised	
== Celastraceae ==
Stackhousia sp.		West Wallabi I.			Harvey et al. (2001) lists this under Stackhousiaceae, but it is now generally treated under Celastraceae.	
Stackhousia sp.		East Wallabi I., North I., West Wallabi I.			Harvey et al. (2001) lists this as Stackhousia viminea, but this name has been misapplied in Western Australia against three species: S. clementii, S. muricata and S. intermedia. Harvey et al. (2001) treats Stackhousia under Stackhousiaceae, but it is now generally treated under Celastraceae.	
Tripterococcus brunonis		East Wallabi I.			Harvey et al. (2001) lists this under Stackhousiaceae, but it is now generally treated under Celastraceae.	
== Chenopodiaceae ==
Atriplex amnicola	Swamp Saltbush			Gun I., Murray I., Pelsaert I.		
Atriplex bunburyana	Silver Saltbush		Rat I.			
Atriplex cinerea	Grey Saltbush	27 islands	21 islands	22 islands		
Atriplex paludosa	Marsh Saltbush	Little Pigeon I., Long I., Mangrove I., North I., Pelican I., Pigeon I., Tattler I., West Wallabi I.				
Atriplex paludosa subsp. baudinii			Rat I.			
Atriplex vesicaria subsp. variabilis	Bladder Saltbush	Seagull I.				
Atriplex sp.	Saltbush	17 islands	10 islands	18 islands		
Chenopodium album	Fat Hen		Rat I.		Naturalised	
Chenopodium melanocarpum	Black Crumbweed	East Wallabi I.				
Chenopodium murale	Nettle-leaf Goosefoot	Beacon I., North I., Pelican I., West Wallabi I.	Alexander I., Joe Smith I., "Landscope I.", "Nitraria I.", Rat I., Wooded I.	Burton I., Gun I., "Little Jackson I.", Pelsaert I., Square I., Uncle Margie I.	Naturalised	
Chenopodium nitrariaceum	Nitre Goosefoot	East Wallabi I., West Wallabi I.				
Dysphania plantaginella		East Wallabi I.				
Enchylaena tomentosa	Barrier Saltbush	26 islands	11 islands	17 islands		
Rhagodia baccata	Berry Saltbush	Akerstrom I., East Wallabi I., North I., Oystercatcher I., Pigeon I., Seagull I., Tattler I., Turnstone I., West Wallabi I.				
Rhagodia latifolia		Akerstrom I., "Eagle Point Islet", Little Pigeon I., North I., Pigeon I.				
Rhagodia preissii subsp. obovata			Little Rat I., Rat I.			
Rhagodia sp.			Rat I.			
Salsola kali	Prickly Saltwort	Dick I., Eastern I., East Wallabi I., Long I., North I., Seal I., Third Sister, West Wallabi I.	Bynoe I., Campbell I., Crake I., Leo I., Morley I., Rat I.	Basile I., Coronation I., Pelsaert I., Stick I.	Naturalised	
Sarcocornia quinqueflora	Beaded samphire	17 islands	19 islands	15 islands		
Suaeda australis	Seablite	11 islands	"Nitraria I.", Tapani I., Wooded I.	Newman I., Pelsaert I.		
Tecticornia arbuscula		East Wallabi I., North I., Pigeon I., West Wallabi I.		Gun I., Middle I., Murray I., Pelsaert I.	Harvey et al. (2001) listed Sclerostegia arbuscula, but all Sclerostegia were transferred into Tecticornia in 2007.	
Tecticornia halocnemoides	Shrubby Samphire	Akerstrom I., Alcatraz I., Barge Rock, East Wallabi I., North I., Pigeon I., Shag Rock, West Wallabi I.	13 islands	25 islands	Harvey et al. (2001) listed Halosarcia halocnemoides, but all Halosarcia were transferred into Tecticornia in 2007.	
Tecticornia lepidosperma subsp. bidens		Akerstrom I.	Little Rat I., Rat I.	Lagoon I., Pelsaert I.	Harvey et al. (2001) listed Halosarcia indica subsp. bidens, but all Halosarcia were transferred into Tecticornia in 2007.	
Tecticornia sp.	Samphire	West Wallabi I.			Harvey et al. (2001) listed Halosarcia sp., but all Halosarcia were transferred to Tecticornia in 2007.	
Threlkeldia diffusa	Coast Bonefruit	33 islands	19 islands	20 islands		
== Colchicaceae ==
Wurmbea monantha		East Wallabi I., North I., West Wallabi I.	Alexander I., Serventy I.			
== Convolvulaceae ==
Ipomoea cairica			Little Rat I.		Naturalised	
== Crassulaceae ==
Bryophyllum delagoense	Mother of Millions	Pigeon I.	Rat I.		Naturalised. In 2000 this poisonous weed was found to have colonised over half of Rat and Pigeon Islands.	
Crassula colorata	Dense Stonecrop	Dick I., Eastern I., East Wallabi I., Long I., North I., Tattler I., West Wallabi I.	10 islands	Basile I., Burton I., Middle I., Pelsaert I., Stick I.		
Crassula exserta			Bynoe I., Campbell I., Leo I., White I.			
Cotyledon orbiculata		Dick I., Eastern I., Pigeon I., West Wallabi I.				
== Cucurbitaceae ==
Cucurbita pepo			Rat I.			
== Cunoniaceae ==
Aphanopetalum clematideum		East Wallabi I.				
== Cyperaceae ==
Ficinia nodosa	Knotted Club Rush	North I.			Harvey et al. (2001) listed Isolepis nodosa, but this species has since been transferred into Ficinia.	
Isolepis marginata	Coarse Clubrush	East Wallabi I., West Wallabi I.			Naturalised	
== Dasypogonaceae ==
Acanthocarpus preissii		"Eagle Point Islet", East Wallabi I., Little Pigeon I., North I., Oystercatcher I., Pigeon I., Seagull I., Tattler I., West Wallabi I.				
== Dilleniaceae ==
Hibbertia racemosa	Stalked Guinea Flower	East Wallabi I., West Wallabi I.				
== Epacridaceae ==
Leucopogon insularis		East Wallabi I., West Wallabi I.				
== Euphorbiaceae ==
Beyeria viscosa	Pinkwood	East Wallabi I., Oystercatcher I., West Wallabi I.				
Euphorbia boophthona	Gascoyne Spurge	Pigeon I.				
Euphorbia drummondii	Caustic Weed	East Wallabi I., West Wallabi I.	Little Rat I., Rat I.	Middle I.		
Euphorbia tannensis		"Eagle Point Islet", Little Pigeon I., North I., Oystercatcher I., Pigeon I., Seagull I., Turnstone I.		Middle I.		
Euphorbia terracina	Geraldton Carnation Weed	Pigeon I.	Little Rat I., Rat I.		Naturalised	
Phyllanthus calycinus	False Boronia	East Wallabi I., West Wallabi I.				
== Frankeniaceae ==
Frankenia pauciflora	Seaheath	11 islands	Bushby I., Campbell I., Little Rat I., Rat I.	Davis I., Gun I., Middle I., Murray I., Pelsaert I., Sweet I.		
== Gentianaceae ==
Centaurium erythraea	Common Centaury		Bushby I., Little Rat I.		Naturalised	
Schenkia australis		East Wallabi I., North I., Pigeon I., Tattler I., Turnstone I., West Wallabi I.		Basile I., Gun I., Pelsaert I.	Naturalised. Harvey et al. (2001) lists this as Centaurium spicatum, but this species has been transferred into Schenkia, and the Australian specimens segregated into a new species as S. australis. Harvey et al. (2001) also lists C. maritimum on East Wallabi Island, but this name has been misapplied for C. spicatum in Australia.	
== Geraniaceae ==
Erodium cicutarium	Common Storksbill	Barge Rock, East Wallabi I., Long I., North I., Pigeon I., West Wallabi I.	Little Rat I., Rat I.	Middle I., Pelsaert I., Square I.	Naturalised	
Erodium cygnorum	Blue Heronsbill	East Wallabi I., North I., Pigeon I.				
Pelargonium littorale		East Wallabi I.				
Pelargonium zonale			Rat I.		Naturalised. Harvey et al. (2001) lists this species, but FloraBase has no record of it occurring in Western Australia.	
== Goodeniaceae ==
Scaevola crassifolia	Thick-leaved Fan-flower	East Wallabi I., North I., Seagull I., West Wallabi I.	Campbell I., Rat I., Suomi I.	Pelsaert I.		
== Haloragaceae ==
Haloragis trigonocarpa		East Wallabi I., Pigeon I.				
== Juncaceae ==
Juncus bufonius	Toad Rush	East Wallabi I., North I., Pigeon I., West Wallabi I.			Naturalised	
== Juncaginaceae ==
Triglochin centrocarpa		Dick I., Pigeon I., West Wallabi I.		Gun I., Middle I., Pelsaert I., Three I.		
Triglochin mucronata		North I., West Wallabi I.				
Triglochin muelleri		East Wallabi I.				
Triglochin trichophora		Barge Rock, East Wallabi I., North I.	Keru I., Rat I., Serventy I.			
== Lamiaceae ==
Westringia dampieri		East Wallabi I., First Sister, West Wallabi I.				
== Liliaceae ==
Aloe sp.		Little Pigeon I.			Naturalised	
== Loganiaceae ==
Phyllangium paradoxum		West Wallabi I.				
== Malvaceae ==
Lavatera sp.			"Shearwater Islet"			
Malva preissiana	Australian Hollyhock	21 islands	15 islands	12 islands	Harvey et al. (2001) lists this as Lavatera plebeia, but this is now a synonym of M. preissiana.	
Malva linnaei	Cretan Mallow		Little North I., White I.		Naturalised according to FloraBase, though not according to Harvey et al. (2001). The latter source lists this as Lavatera cretica, but this is now a synonym of M. linnaei.	
Malva parviflora	Marshmallow	East Wallabi I., North I., Pigeon I., West Wallabi I.	Rat I.	Newman I., Sid Liddon I.	Naturalised	
Sida spodochroma		East Wallabi I.				
== Mimosaceae ==
Acacia didyma		East Wallabi I.				
== Myoporaceae ==
Eremophila glabra	Tar Bush	East Wallabi I., West Wallabi I.		Basile I., Middle I.		
Eremophila deserti		East Wallabi I.				
Myoporum insulare	Blueberry Tree	27 islands	22 islands	17 islands		
== Myrtaceae ==
Eucalyptus oraria	Ooragmandee	East Wallabi I.				
== Onagraceae ==
Epilobium billardiereanum	Glabrous Willow Herb	East Wallabi I.				
== Orobanchaceae ==
Orobanche minor	Lesser Broomrape	East Wallabi I.			Naturalised	
== Orchidaceae ==
Microtis media	Tall Mignonette Orchid	East Wallabi I.				
Microtis sp.		East Wallabi I.				
== Oxalidaceae ==
Oxalis corniculata	Yellow Wood Sorrel	East Wallabi I., West Wallabi I.			Naturalised	
== Papilionaceae ==
Bossiaea spinescens		East Wallabi I.				
Medicago polymorpha	Burr Medic	Little Pigeon I., Pigeon I.	Little Rat I., Rat I., Suomi I.	Pelsaert I.	Naturalised	
Medicago sp.			Rat I.		Naturalised	
Melilotus indicus		Beacon I., North I.	Bushby I., Little Rat I., Rat I.	Basile I., Gun I., Pelsaert I., Post Office I.	Naturalised	
Mirbelia ramulosa		East Wallabi I.				
== Phormiaceae ==
Dianella revoluta	Blueberry Lily	"Eagle Point Islet", East Wallabi I., Oystercatcher I., Pigeon I., Seagull I., Tattler I., West Wallabi I.				
== Pittosporaceae ==
Pittosporum phillyreoides	Weeping Pittosporum	10 islands		Middle I.		
== Plantaginaceae ==
Plantago coronopus	Buckshorn Plantain		Little Rat I.			
Plantago debilis		East Wallabi I., North I., Pigeon I., West Wallabi I.		Middle I.		
== Plumbaginaceae ==
Muellerolimon salicorniaceum		10 islands	Little Rat I., Rat I.	Middle I.		
== Poaceae ==
Austrodanthonia caespitosa		East Wallabi I., North I.				
Austrostipa crinita		North I.				
Austrostipa elegantissima		East Wallabi I., Long I., Oystercatcher I., Pigeon I., Seagull I., Turnstone I., West Wallabi I.		Middle I.		
Austrostipa flavescens		Akerstrom I., Oystercatcher I., Seagull I., Tattler I.				
Austrostipa variabilis		East Wallabi I., North I., Tattler I., West Wallabi I.	Rat I.			
Avena barbata	Bearded Oat	Little Pigeon I., Pigeon I.	Roma I., Wooded I.	Basile I., Pelsaert I.	Naturalised	
Avena fatua	Wild Oat	North I.	Alexander I., Little Rat I., Rat I., Serventy I., Suomi I., Wooded I.	Basile I., Burnett Rock, Burton I., Pelsaert I., Uncle Margie I.	Naturalised	
Avena sp.		Beacon I., Tattler I.	Bushby I.		Naturalised	
Bromus arenarius	Sand Brome	13 islands	13 islands	Burnett Rock, Burton I., Coronation I. Newman I., Pelsaert I., Post Office I., Stick I.		
Bromus diandrus	Great Brome	Beacon I., Little Pigeon I., Long I., North I., Pigeon I., Seagull I., Turnstone I.	Alexander I., Campbell I., Gilbert I., Leo I., Wooded I.	Basile I., Burton I., Eight I., Three I.	Naturalised	
Bromus hordeaceus	Soft Brome	11 islands		Middle I., Pelsaert I., Square I.	Naturalised	
Bromus japonicus var. vestitus		Seal I.			Naturalised	
Bromus madritensis	Madrid Brome	North I.			Naturalised	
Bromus rubens	Red Brome			Basile I., Burnett Rock, Uncle Margie I.	Naturalised	
Bromus sp.			Campbell I.	Gun I., Murray I., One I., Sweet I.	Naturalised	
Cynodon dactylon	Couch	East Wallabi I., North I., Pigeon I.	Rat I., Wooded I.		Naturalised	
Cynodon sp.			Rat I.			
Ehrharta brevifolia	Annual Veldt Grass	East Wallabi I.		Pelsaert I.	Naturalised	
Ehrharta longiflora	Annual Veldt Grass	Barge Rock, Beacon I., Little Pigeon I., Pigeon I., Seagull I., Tattler I.	12 islands	Basile Rock, Burton I., Eight I., Gun I., Jackson I., Newman I., Pelsaert I., Uncle Margie I.	Naturalised	
Eragrostis dielsii	Mallee Lovegrass	Akerstrom I., East Wallabi I., Little Pigeon I., North I., Pigeon I., Turnstone I.	Little Rat I., Rat I.	Pelsaert I.		
Hordeum murinum subsp. leporinum	Barley Grass	Little Pigeon I., North I., Pigeon I.	Alexander Island	Basile I.	Naturalised; in Western Australia this is treated at species rank as Hordeum leporinum.	
Lachnagrostis filiformis	Blown Grass	East Wallabi I., West Wallabi I.			Harvey et al. (2001) lists this as Agrostis avenacea, but this is now a synonym of L. filiformis.	
Lolium multiflorum	Italian Ryegrass	West Wallabi I.			Naturalised	
Lolium perenne	Perennial Ryegrass	West Wallabi I.		Basile I.	Naturalised	
Lolium rigidum	Wimmera Ryegrass	Alcatraz I., Little Pigeon I.		Pelsaert I.	Naturalised	
Lolium temulentum	Drake		Campbell I., Leo I., Rat I.	Stick I.	Naturalised	
Parapholis incurva	Coast Barbgrass	North I.	Bynoe I., Campbell I., Keru I., Leo I., Morley I., Roma I.	Uncle Margie I.	Naturalised	
Pennisetum clandestinum	Kikuyu Grass		Little Rat I.		Naturalised	
Phalaris canariensis	Canary Grass			Post Office I.	Naturalised	
Phalaris minor	Lesser Canary Grass	North I., Pigeon I., East Wallabi I.	Alexander I., Morley I., Serventy I., Suomi I.	Basile I., Burnett Rock, Burton I., Post Office I., Uncle Margie I.	Naturalised	
Phleum pratense	Timothy			"Gun Islet"	Naturalised	
Poa annua	Winter Grass	Beacon I., East Wallabi I.			Naturalised	
Poa poiformis	Coastal Poa	East Wallabi I.				
Polypogon monspeliensis	Annual Beardgrass	Little Pigeon I., Long I., West Wallabi I.			Naturalised	
Polypogon tenellus		East Wallabi I., Pigeon I., West Wallabi I.				
Rostraria cristata		Little Pigeon I., North I., Pigeon I.	Bynoe I., Serventy I.		Naturalised	
Setaria dielsii	Diels' Pigeon Grass	16 islands	11 islands	Burnett Rock, Burton I., Gun I., Middle I., Newman I., Pelsaert I., Square I., Three I.		
Setaria sp.		Dick I.				
Spinifex longifolius	Beach Spinifex	15 islands	13 islands	Burton I., Coronation I., Hummock I., Middle I., Pelsaert I., Post Office I., Stick I., Uncle Margie I.		
Sporobolus virginicus	Marine Couch	North I., Oystercatcher I., Pigeon I., Seagull I., Turnstone I., West Wallabi I.		Middle I.		
Triticum aestivum	Wheat	North I.			Naturalised	
Vulpia myuros	Rat's Tail Fescue	Akerstrom I., East Wallabi I., Little Pigeon I., North I., Pigeon I., Turnstone I., West Wallabi I.	Little Rat I., Rat I., Serventy I.		Naturalised	
== Polygonaceae ==
Emex australis	Doublegee	Little Pigeon I., Pigeon I.	Rat I.		Naturalised	
== Portulacaceae ==
Calandrinia calyptrata	Pink Purslane	North I.		Rotondella I., Uncle Margie I.		
== Primulaceae ==
Anagallis arvensis	Pimpernel	Pigeon I., West Wallabi I.	Alexander I., Bushby I., Little Rat I., Rat I., Serventy I.	Gun I., Middle I., Pelsaert I.	Naturalised	
== Proteaceae ==
Grevillea argyrophylla	Silvery-leaved Grevillea	East Wallabi I., North I., Pelican I., Saville-Kent I., West Wallabi I.		Basile I., Middle I., Murray I.		
== Ranunculaceae ==
Ranunculus sessiliflorus	Smallflower Buttercup	East Wallabi I.				
== Rhamnaceae ==
Spyridium globulosum	Basket Bush	East Wallabi I., North I., West Wallabi I.				
== Rubiaceae ==
Galium sp.		East Wallabi I.			Harvey et al. (2001) list this as "Galium migrans" but, according to FloraBase, that species is not present in Western Australia.	
Opercularia vaginata	Dog Weed	East Wallabi I.				
== Rutaceae ==
Diplolaena grandiflora	Wild Rose	"Eagle Point Islet", East Wallabi I., Little Pigeon I., Oystercatcher I., Pigeon I., Seagull I., Tattler I., Turnstone I., West Wallabi I.	Little Rat I., Rat I.	Gun I.		
== Santalaceae ==
Exocarpos aphyllus	Leafless Ballart	East Wallabi I., Little Pigeon I., Long I., Oystercatcher I., Pigeon I., Seagull I., Tattler I., West Wallabi I.				
Exocarpos sparteus	Broom Ballart	North I., West Wallabi I.				
== Sapindaceae ==
Dodonaea aptera	Coast Hop-bush	East Wallabi I., North I., Oystercatcher I., West Wallabi I.				
Dodonaea inaequifolia		East Wallabi I., Oystercatcher I., West Wallabi I.				
Dodonaea viscosa	Sticky Hopbush	Seagull I.				
== Scrophulariaceae ==
Dischisma arenarium		West Wallabi I.			Naturalised	
== Solanaceae ==
Lycium ferocissimum	African boxthorn		Wooded I.	Arthur I., Davis I., Eight I., Gun I., Pelsaert I., Seven I., Sid Liddon I., Sweet I., Three I.	Naturalised. This has been declared a noxious weed, and an eradication program is in place. Harvey et al. (2001) record the plant on only these ten islands, but in 2007 the Department of Environment and Conservation reported that it had been eradicated from 14 out of 18 islands on which it had previously occurred.	
Lycopersicon esculentum	Tomato		Rat I., Roma I.	Jackson I., Middle I.	Naturalised	
Nicotiana glauca	Tree tobacco	Pigeon I.			Naturalised	
Nicotiana occidentalis subsp. hesperis	Native Tobacco	14 islands	Alexander I., Morley I., White I., Wooded I.	Middle I., Pelsaert I.		
Solanum laciniatum	Kangaroo Apple	East Wallabi I.			Naturalised	
Solanum nigrum	Black Berry Nightshade	Beacon I., East Wallabi I., Little Pigeon I., Pigeon I., West Wallabi I.	Bushby I., Little Rat I., Rat I., Roma I.	Eight I., Gun I.	Naturalised	
Solanum symonii		Alcatraz I., Beacon I., East Wallabi I., Oystercatcher I., Seagull I.				
== Sterculiaceae ==
Lasiopetalum angustifolium	Narrow Leaved Lasiopetalum	East Wallabi I.				
== Tamaricaceae ==
Tamarix aphylla	Athel Tree	Pigeon I., West Wallabi I.			Naturalised. Harvey et al. (2001) list this as "Tamarix sp.", but T. aphylla is the only Tamarix species naturalised in Western Australia.	
== Thymelaeaceae ==
Pimelea microcephala	Shrubby Riceflower	11 islands				
== Urticaceae ==
Parietaria cardiostegia		Dakin I., Saville-Kent I.	Bynoe I., Keru I.	Burton I.		
Parietaria debilis	Pellitory	Beacon I., Dakin I., Dick I., Eastern I., East Wallabi I., Long I., North I., Saville-Kent I., West Wallabi I.	Alexander I., Bynoe I., Keru I., Leo I., Little North I., Morley I., Rat I., White I.	13 islands		
Urtica urens	Small Nettle	East Wallabi I., West Wallabi I.			Naturalised	
== Zygophyllaceae ==
Nitraria billardierei	Nitre Bush	43 islands	30 islands	34 islands	This is the most widespread plant species in the Houtman Abrolhos.	
Zygophyllum simile		Beacon I., Dakin I., Dick I., East Wallabi I., Long I., North I., Saville-Kent I., West Wallabi I.				
