= List of islands in the Houtman Abrolhos =

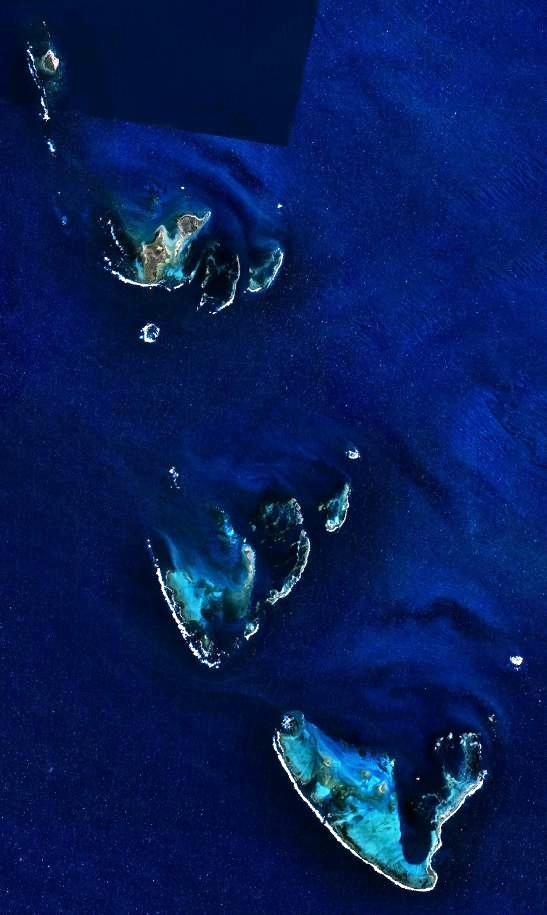
Houtman Abrolhos from space

The Houtman Abrolhos is an island chain off the west coast of Australia. It is widely reported that the Houtman Abrolhos contains 122 islands, but only 93 islands had gazetted names in 1996. In the gazetteer of 2011 Hartley Island appears no more, but Barge Rock, Second Sister and Shag Rock appear, which raises the number of gazetted names to 96 (30 in the Wallabi Group, 38 in the Pelsaert Group and 28 in the Easter Group).

In addition to the gazetted islands, six island groups have been gazetted. The three main groups are the Wallabi Group, the Easter Group and the Pelsaert Group. In addition, the Easter Group contains a group known as the Eastern Islands, and the Pelsaert group contains groups known as the Mangrove Group and the Numbered Islands.

The Inventory of the Land Conservation Values of the Houtman Abrolhos mentions many more unofficially named islets, 16 in the Wallabi Group, 26 in the Eastern Group and 15 in the Pelsaert Group, plus the subgroups of the Jackson Islets (7 islets without individual names or numbers) and The Coral Patches (13 islets without individual names or numbers), also in the Pelsaert Group.

This makes for a total of 173 known islands, islets and above-water rocks with land area in the Houtman Abrolhos.

This list is complete with respect to the 1996 Gazetteer of Australia.

Name	Area m^{2}	Coordinates	Group, subgroup
1 Island	17661	28°54′34″S 113°52′55″E	Pelsaert Group, Numbered Islands
2 Island	3207	28°54′34″S 113°52′42″E	Pelsaert Group, Numbered Islands
3 Island	17166	28°54′24″S 113°52′16″E	Pelsaert Group, Numbered Islands
7 Island	4419	28°54′22″S 113°51′21″E	Pelsaert Group, Numbered Islands
8 Island	6154	28°53′56″S 113°51′36″E	Pelsaert Group, Numbered Islands
Akerstrom Island	12073	28°28′30″S 113°41′51″E	Wallabi Group
Alcatraz Island	716.	28°27′43″S 113°43′18″E	Wallabi Group
Alexander Island	128610	28°40′26″S 113°49′44″E	Easter Group
Arthur Island	...	28°53′55″S 114°0′12″E	Pelsaert Group
Barge Rock	...	28°27′2″S 113°43′17″E	Wallabi Group
Basile Island	...	28°52′33″S 113°57′38″E	Pelsaert Group
Beacon Island	...	28°28′35″S 113°47′2″E	Wallabi Group
Burnett Island	...	28°52′22″S 113°57′47″E	Pelsaert Group
Burton Island	...	28°51′59″S 113°59′6″E	Pelsaert Group
Bushby Island	...	28°43′25″S 113°47′7″E	Easter Group
Bynoe Island	...	28°39′54″S 113°52′31″E	Easter Group, Eastern Islands
Campbell Island	...	28°41′44″S 113°50′5″E	Easter Group
Coronation Island	...	28°52′14″S 113°59′7″E	Pelsaert Group
Crake Island	...	28°44′31″S 113°48′57″E	Easter Group
Dakin Island	...	28°28′37″S 113°48′25″E	Wallabi Group
Davis Island (5 Island)	...	28°54′53″S 113°52′33″E	Pelsaert Group, Numbered Islands
Dicks Island	...	28°29′51″S 113°45′56″E	Wallabi Group
Disappearing Island	...	28°47′3″S 113°44′23″E	Easter Group
Diver Island	...	28°52′2″S 113°58′20″E	Pelsaert Group
Dry Island	...	28°44′22″S 113°46′43″E	Easter Group
East Wallabi Island	...	28°26′23″S 113°43′33″E	Wallabi Group
Eastern Island	...	28°27′55″S 113°48′42″E	Wallabi Group
Eight Island	...	28°53′56″S 113°51′36″E	Pelsaert Group
Far Island	...	28°27′40″S 113°48′19″E	Wallabi Group
First Sister	...	28°28′39″S 113°44′33″E	Wallabi Group
Foale Island	...	28°52′45″S 114°0′20″E	Pelsaert Group
Gaze Island	...	28°51′50″S 113°59′25″E	Pelsaert Group
Gibson Island	...	28°41′13″S 113°49′40″E	Easter Group
Gilbert Island	...	28°40′5″S 113°49′34″E	Easter Group
Gregory Island	...	28°53′55″S 114°0′19″E	Pelsaert Group
Gun Island	...	28°53′17″S 113°51′26″E	Pelsaert Group
Hall Island	...	28°28′18″S 113°48′36″E	Wallabi Group
Helms Island	...	28°40′10″S 113°51′38″E	Easter Group, Eastern Islands
Hummock Island	...	28°48′2″S 114°2′20″E	Pelsaert Group
Iris Refuge Island	...	28°52′48″S 114°0′16″E	Pelsaert Group
Jackson Island	...	28°52′17″S 114°0′10″E	Pelsaert Group
Joe Smith Island	...	28°40′55″S 113°51′28″E	Easter Group, Eastern Islands
Jon Jim Island	...	28°59′14″S 113°57′34″E	Pelsaert Group
Keru Island	...	28°43′34″S 113°49′57″E	Easter Group
Lagoon Island	...	28°52′22″S 113°59′39″E	Pelsaert Group
Leo Island	...	28°41′22″S 113°51′36″E	Easter Group, Eastern Islands
Little North Island	...	28°37′51″S 113°52′53″E	Easter Group, Eastern Islands
Little Pigeon Island	...	28°27′49″S 113°43′20″E	Wallabi Group
Little Rat Island	...	28°43′41″S 113°47′7″E	Easter Group
Little Roma Island	...	28°44′7″S 113°46′51″E	Easter Group
Long Island	...	28°28′20″S 113°46′21″E	Wallabi Group
Marinula Island	...	28°28′31″S 113°41′57″E	Wallabi Group
Middle Island	...	28°54′31″S 113°54′36″E	Pelsaert Group
Morley Island	...	28°44′47″S 113°48′45″E	Easter Group
Murray Island	...	28°53′53″S 113°53′47″E	Pelsaert Group
Newbold Island	...	28°52′54″S 114°0′19″E	Pelsaert Group
Newman Island	...	28°51′48″S 113°59′42″E	Pelsaert Group
Nook Island	...	28°51′58″S 113°59′57″E	Pelsaert Group
North Island	...	28°18′9″S 113°35′41″E	Wallabi Group
Oystercatcher Island	...	28°27′48″S 113°42′47″E	Wallabi Group
Pelican Island	...	28°27′36″S 113°40′34″E	Wallabi Group
Pelsaert Island	...	28°55′45″S 113°58′27″E	Pelsaert Group
Pigeon Island	...	28°27′18″S 113°43′34″E	Wallabi Group
Plover Island	...	28°28′5″S 113°42′43″E	Wallabi Group
Post Office Island	...	28°51′53″S 113°58′28″E	Pelsaert Group
Rat Island	...	28°42′56″S 113°47′2″E	Easter Group
Robertson Island	...	28°52′58″S 114°0′20″E	Pelsaert Group
Roma Island	...	28°43′57″S 113°47′6″E	Easter Group
Rotondella Island	...	28°52′21″S 113°59′45″E	Pelsaert Group
Sandy Island	...	28°46′31″S 113°47′8″E	Easter Group
Sandy Island	...	28°52′22″S 113°52′35″E	Pelsaert Group
Saville-Kent Island	...	28°27′56″S 113°48′27″E	Wallabi Group
Seagull Island	...	28°27′29″S 113°42′52″E	Wallabi Group
Seal Island	...	28°29′1″S 113°48′7″E	Wallabi Group
Second Sister	...	28°29′8″S 113°44′25″E	Wallabi Group
Serventy Island	...	28°40′59″S 113°49′52″E	Easter Group
Shag Rock	...	28°28′32″S 113°42′43″E	Wallabi Group
Shearwater Island	...	28°43′56″S 113°49′29″E	Easter Group
Sid Liddon Island (6 Island)	...	28°54′40″S 113°51′49″E	Pelsaert Group, Numbered Islands
Square Island	...	28°54′7″S 113°56′38″E	Pelsaert Group
Stick Island	...	28°53′22″S 113°55′11″E	Pelsaert Group
Stokes Island	...	28°40′30″S 113°51′2″E	Easter Group, Eastern Islands
Suomi Island	...	28°42′45″S 113°50′17″E	Easter Group
Sweet Island (4 Island)	...	28°55′1″S 113°52′17″E	Pelsaert Group, Numbered Islands
Tapani Island	...	28°40′30″S 113°51′16″E	Easter Group, Eastern Islands
Tattler Island	...	28°28′10″S 113°42′22″E	Wallabi Group
Third Sister	...	28°29′46″S 113°44′23″E	Wallabi Group
Traitors Island	...	28°29′6″S 113°46′57″E	Wallabi Group
Travia Island	...	28°51′52″S 113°59′12″E	Pelsaert Group
Turnstone Island	...	28°27′9″S 113°42′57″E	Wallabi Group
Uncle Margie Island	...	28°52′4″S 113°57′59″E	Pelsaert Group
Wann Island	...	28°28′19″S 113°45′45″E	Wallabi Group
West Wallabi Island	...	28°28′3″S 113°41′12″E	Wallabi Group
White Bank	...	28°42′10″S 113°46′30″E	Easter Group
White Island	...	28°40′16″S 113°52′30″E	Easter Group, Eastern Islands
Wooded Island	...	28°45′7″S 113°48′20″E	Easter Group

== See also ==
- List of rocks in Western Australia
