= Pelsaert Island =

Island in Australia

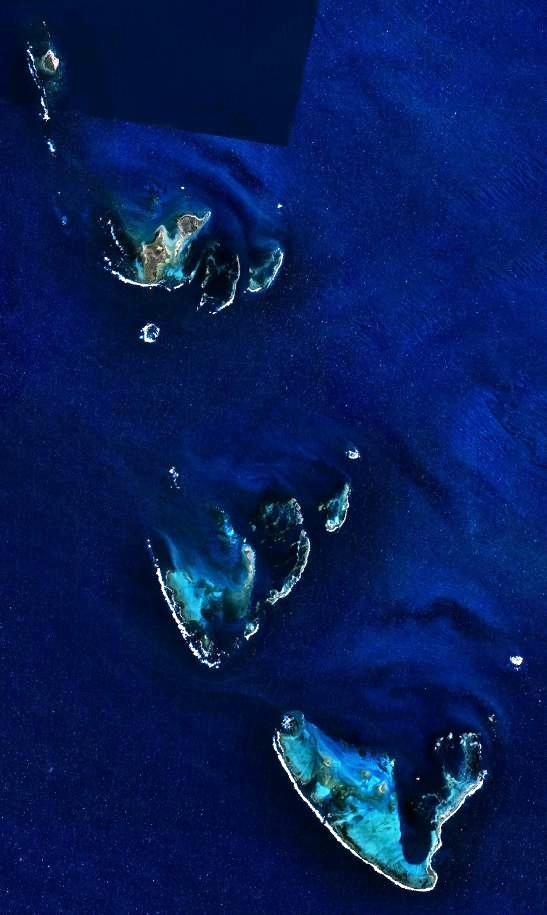
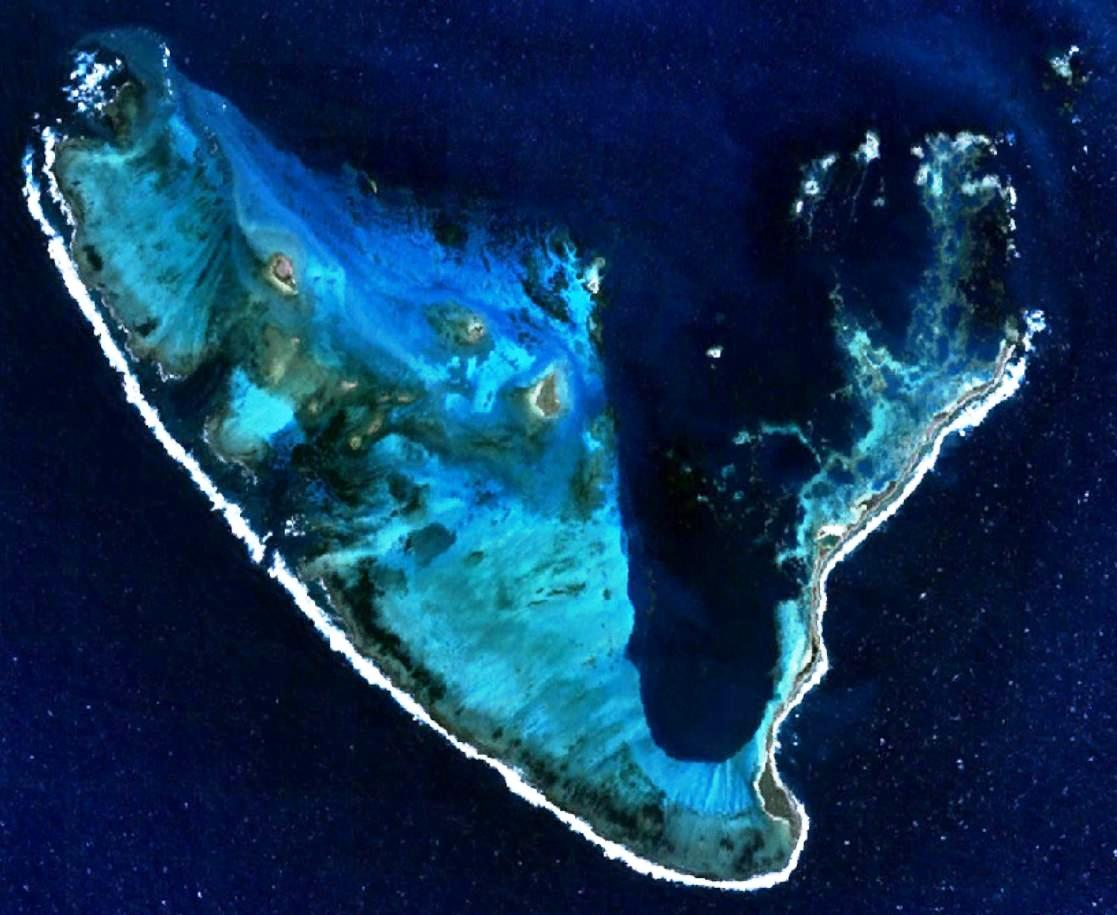

Pelsaert Island is one of the islands of the Pelsaert Group, which is the southernmost of the three groups of islands that make up the Houtman Abrolhos island chain in Western Australia.

Nominally located at 28°54′S 113°54′E, it consists of a number of islands, the largest of which are Gun Island, Middle Island, and Pelsaert Island itself.

The group and island is named by the captain of HMS Beagle, which was charting the area, after the commodore Francisco Pelsaert of the Dutch East India Company trading fleet whose ship, the "Batavia" got wrecked and sank at the Wallabi island group to the north. The captain saw a wreck on the island, mistakenly assumed it was the Batavia and named it after Pelsaert.

The island is a significant bird site.

The island and the group contain the most southerly true coral reefs in the Indian Ocean.

== See also ==
- Wallabi Group
- Easter Group
- List of islands of Western Australia
