= Assail =

Assail may refer to:

- Assail (Malazan), a continent in the Malazan Book of the Fallen series
- HMAS Assail (P 89), an Attack-class patrol boat
- USS Assail (AM-147), an Admirable-class minesweeper

== See also ==
- Assail Bank
- Assailant
