= West Wallabi Island =

Island in Western Australia

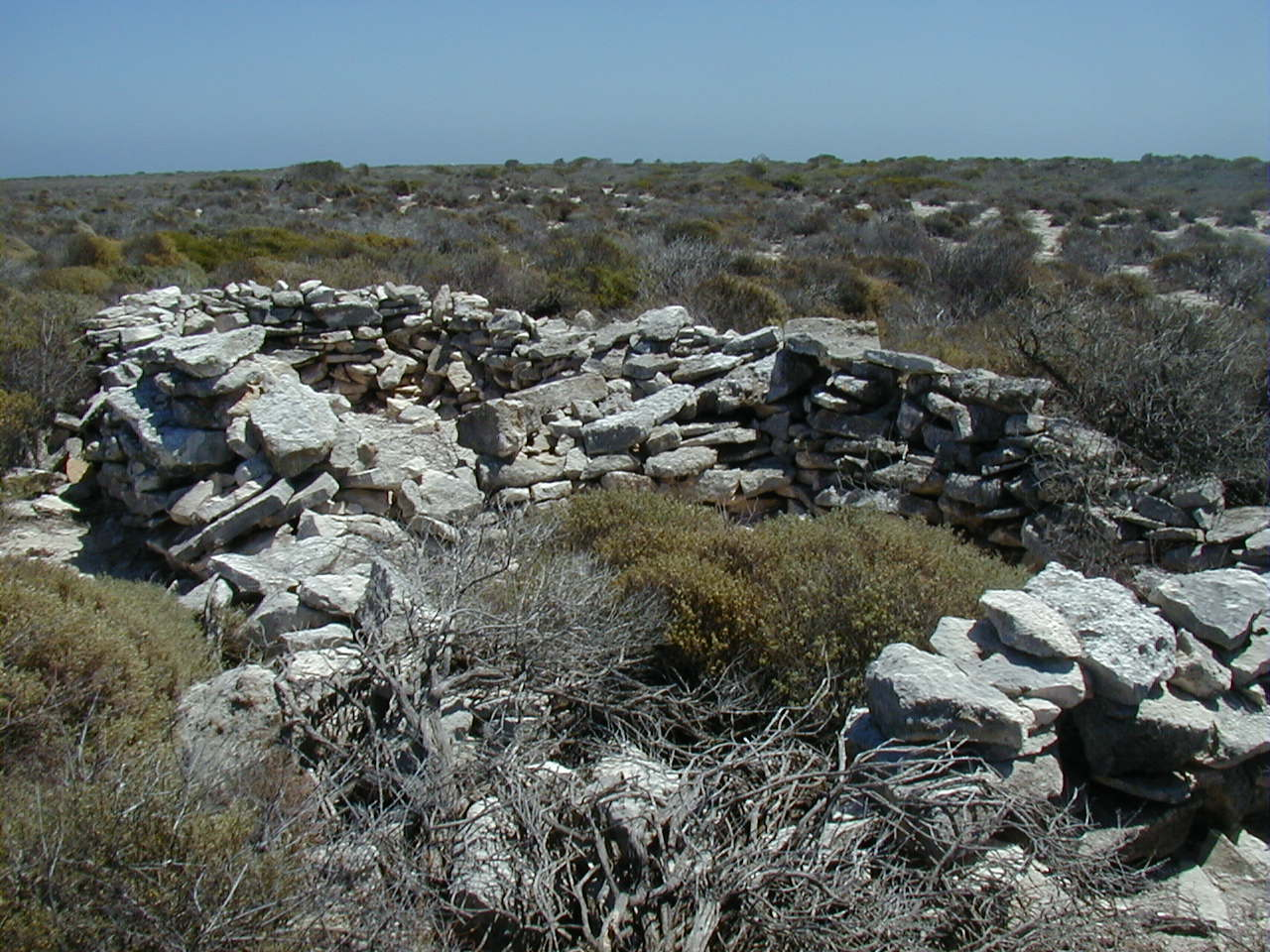
- The Wiebbe Hayes Stone Fort on West Wallabi Island, the oldest surviving European building in Australia, built in 1629 by survivors of the Batavia shipwreck
- Interactive map of West Wallabi Island

Geography
- Location: Indian Ocean, off the coast of Western Australia
- Coordinates: 28°27′55″S 113°41′41″E
- Archipelago: Houtman Abrolhos
- Area: 6.21 km^{2} (2.40 sq mi)
- Coastline: 14.93 km (9.277 mi)

Administration
- Australia
- State: Western Australia

Demographics
- Population: Uninhabited

West Wallabi Island is an island in the Wallabi Group of the Houtman Abrolhos, in the Indian Ocean off the west coast of mainland Australia.

== History ==
West Wallabi Island was important in the story of the Batavia shipwreck and massacre. Following the shipwreck in 1629, a group of soldiers under the command of Wiebbe Hayes were put ashore there to search for water. A group of mutineers, led by Jeronimus Cornelisz, took control of the other survivors and left Hayes' group there in the hope that they would starve or die of thirst. However the soldiers discovered that they could wade to East Wallabi Island, where there was a fresh water spring. Furthermore, West and East Wallabi Islands are the only islands in the group upon which the tammar wallaby lives. Thus the soldiers had access to sources of both food and water that were unavailable to the mutineers.

Later the mutineers mounted a series of attacks, which the soldiers beat off. The Wiebbe Hayes Stone Fort, remnants of improvised defensive walls and stone shelters built by Wiebbe Hayes and his men on West Wallabi Island, are Australia's oldest known European structures, more than 150 years before expeditions to the Australian continent by James Cook and Arthur Phillip.

In the context of the Batavia mutiny and massacre, West Wallabi Island is often referred to as "Wiebbe Hayes' Island". This was the name given it in contemporary sources, and was used by historians as long as it remained a lost toponym.

== Geography ==
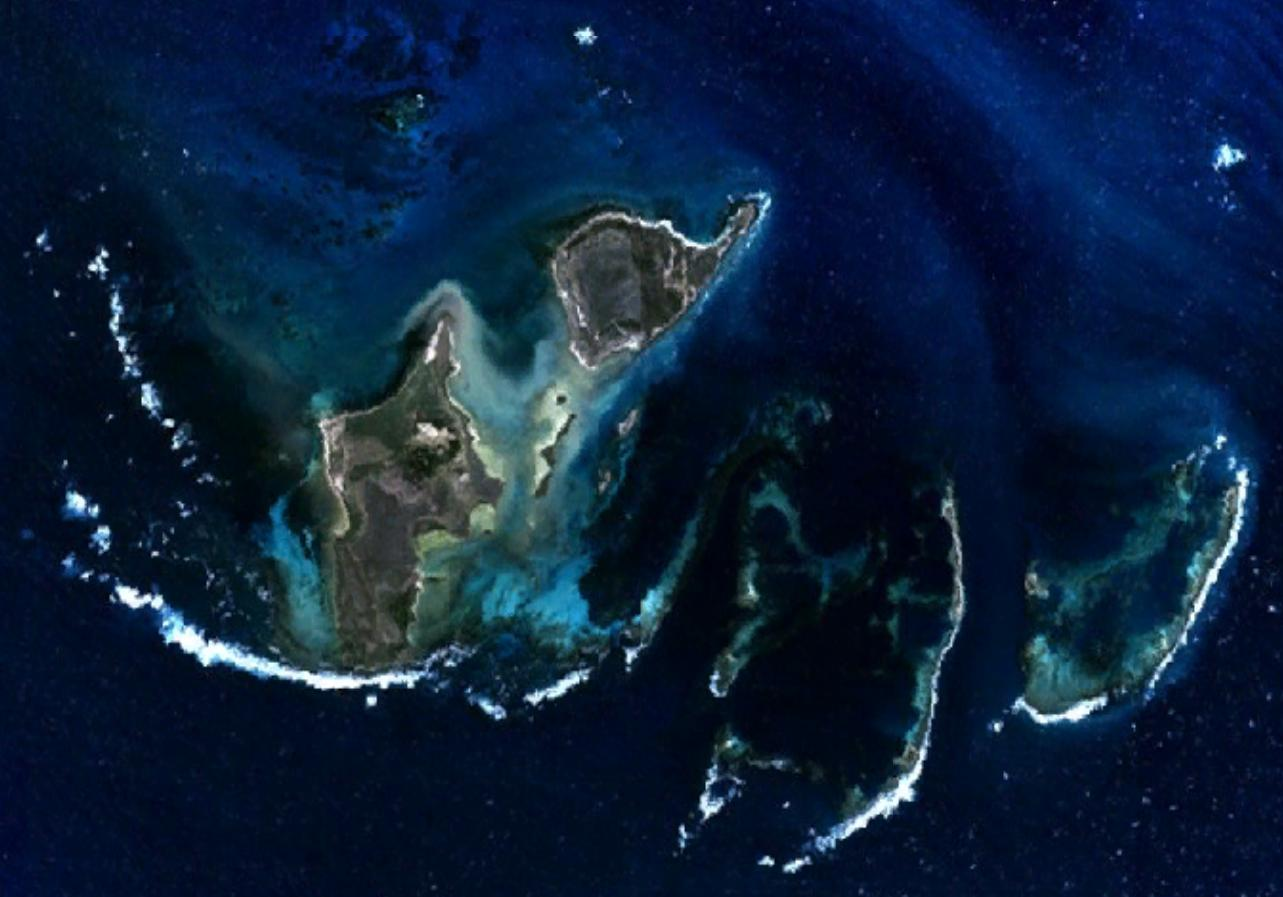
The Wallabi Group (excluding North Island) from space

Nominally located at 28°28′3″S 113°41′12″E, West Wallabi Island is the largest island in the Houtman Abrolhos, with an area of 6.21 km^{2} (about 2.5 sq miles) which is more than a third of the total land area of the archipelago. It is located in the north-west of the Wallabi Group, the northernmost of three island groups in the Houtman Abrolhos.

The island has three named points: Slaughter Point, Blowfish Point and Pelican Point. Between Blowfish Point and Pelican Point is a bay named Shag Bay, and south of Pelican Point is a bay named Horseyard Bay.

The island is surrounded by submerged coral reef. This is narrow at Shag Bay, but fairly extensive along the rest of the coast. To the north-east, the reef is high enough for a person to wade from island to island: islands connected to West Wallabi Island in this way include Barge Rock, Turnstone Island, Seagull Island, Oystercatcher Island and East Wallabi Island.

== Geology and physiography ==
The base of West Wallabi Island is the Wallabi Limestone, a dense calcretised coral limestone platform that underlies the entire Wallabi Group. This platform, which rises abruptly from a flat shelf, is about 40 metres (130 ft) thick, and is of Quaternary origin. Reefs that formed during the Eemian interglacial (about 125,000 years ago) when sea levels were higher than at present, are now emergent in places, and constitute the basement of the group's central platform islands, which include West Wallabi Island.

The basement is capped in some places by an aeolianite pavement, and this is in turn overlain in places by sand dunes.

== Flora ==
As one of the few islands in the Houtman Abrolhos large enough to support dune systems, West Wallabi Island supports a relatively high diversity of plant life: according to a survey published in 2001, 97 plant species occur on the island. Both the dunes and the pavement limestone support species-rich vegetation complexes dominated by chenopod shrubs, and these communities have been identified as important for species conservation, because they are diverse, yet easily disturbed and slow to recover.

== Birds ==
The island is part of the Houtman Abrolhos Important Bird Area, identified as such by BirdLife International because it supports large numbers of breeding seabirds.
