= North East Reef =

Reef in Western Australia

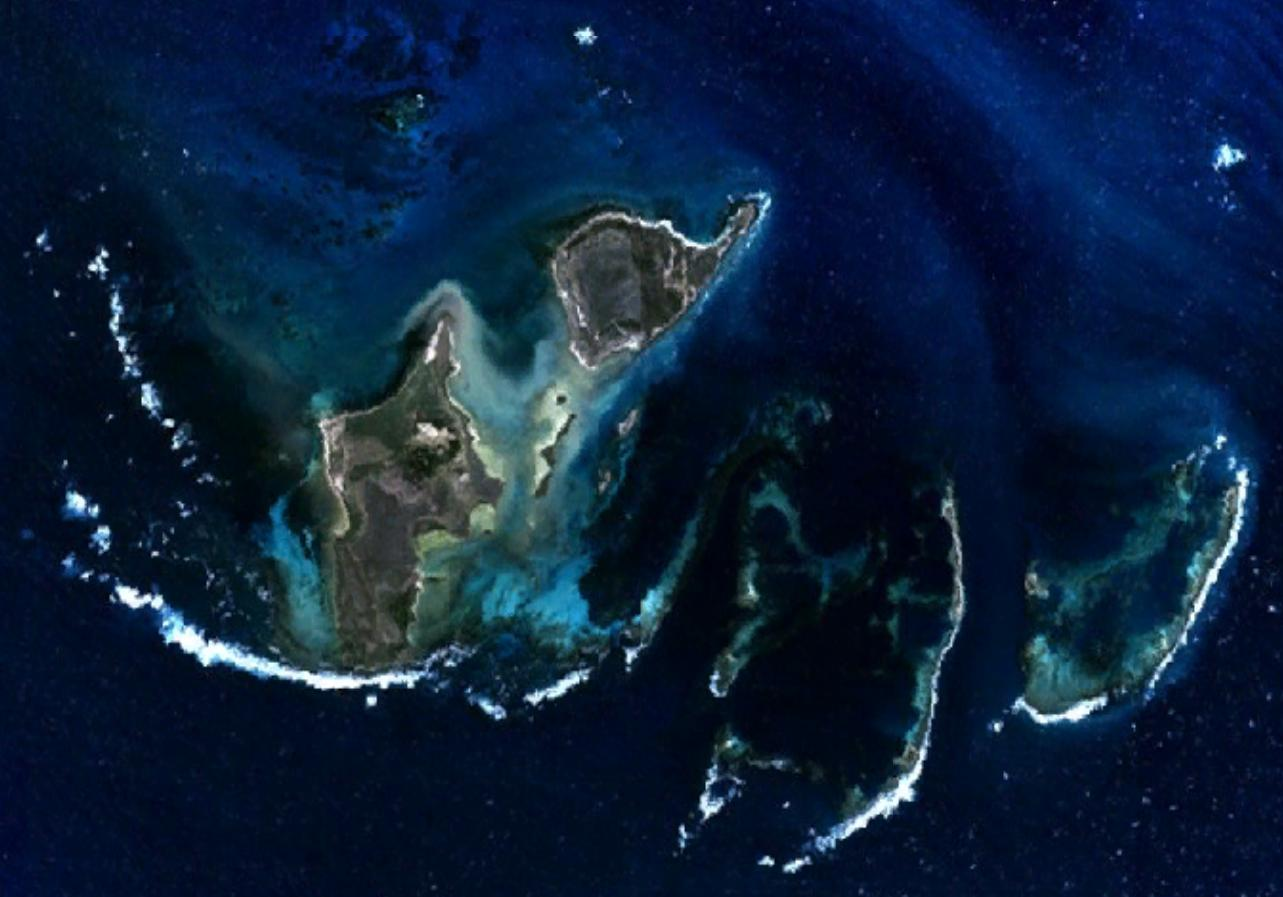

North East Reef is a reef in the Wallabi Group of the Houtman Abrolhos, in the Indian Ocean off the coast of Western Australia. Located at 28°25′13″S 113°48′41″E, it takes its name from the fact that it is situated to the north-east of the main body of islands that makes up the Wallabi Group. The island is part of the Houtman Abrolhos Important Bird Area, identified as such by BirdLife International because of its importance for supporting large numbers of breeding seabirds.

== See also ==
- List of reefs
