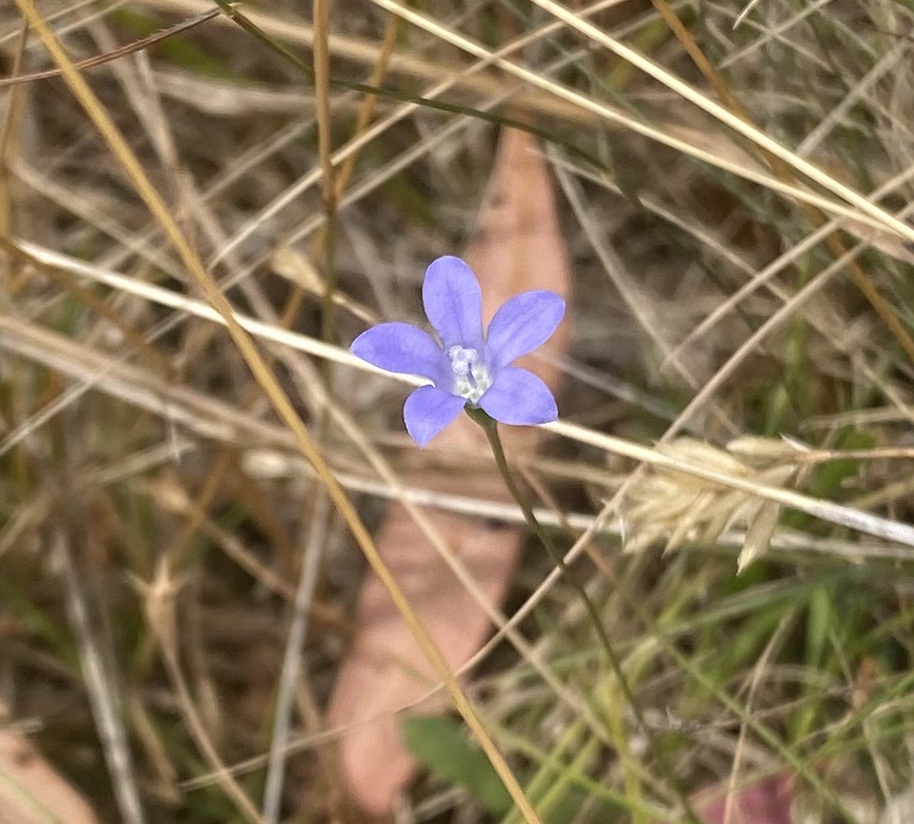

Scientific classification
- Kingdom: Plantae
- Clade: Embryophytes
- Clade: Tracheophytes
- Clade: Spermatophytes
- Clade: Angiosperms
- Clade: Eudicots
- Clade: Asterids
- Order: Asterales
- Family: Campanulaceae
- Genus: Wahlenbergia
- Species: W. gracilis

Binomial name
- Wahlenbergia gracilis G.Forst.
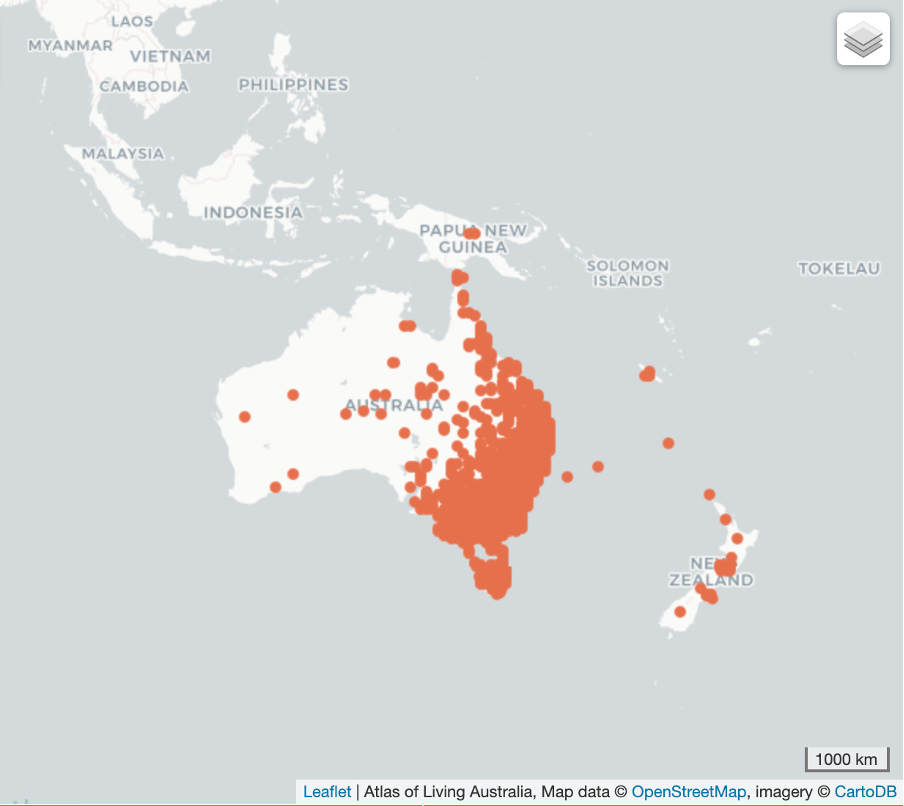
- Distribution of Wahlenbergia gracilis

= Wahlenbergia gracilis =

Species of plant

Wahlenbergia gracilis, commonly known as the Australian bluebell or sprawling bluebell, is a perennial tufted herb from the family Campanulaceae. The species is widespread throughout Australia. The species is not considered at risk.

== Description ==
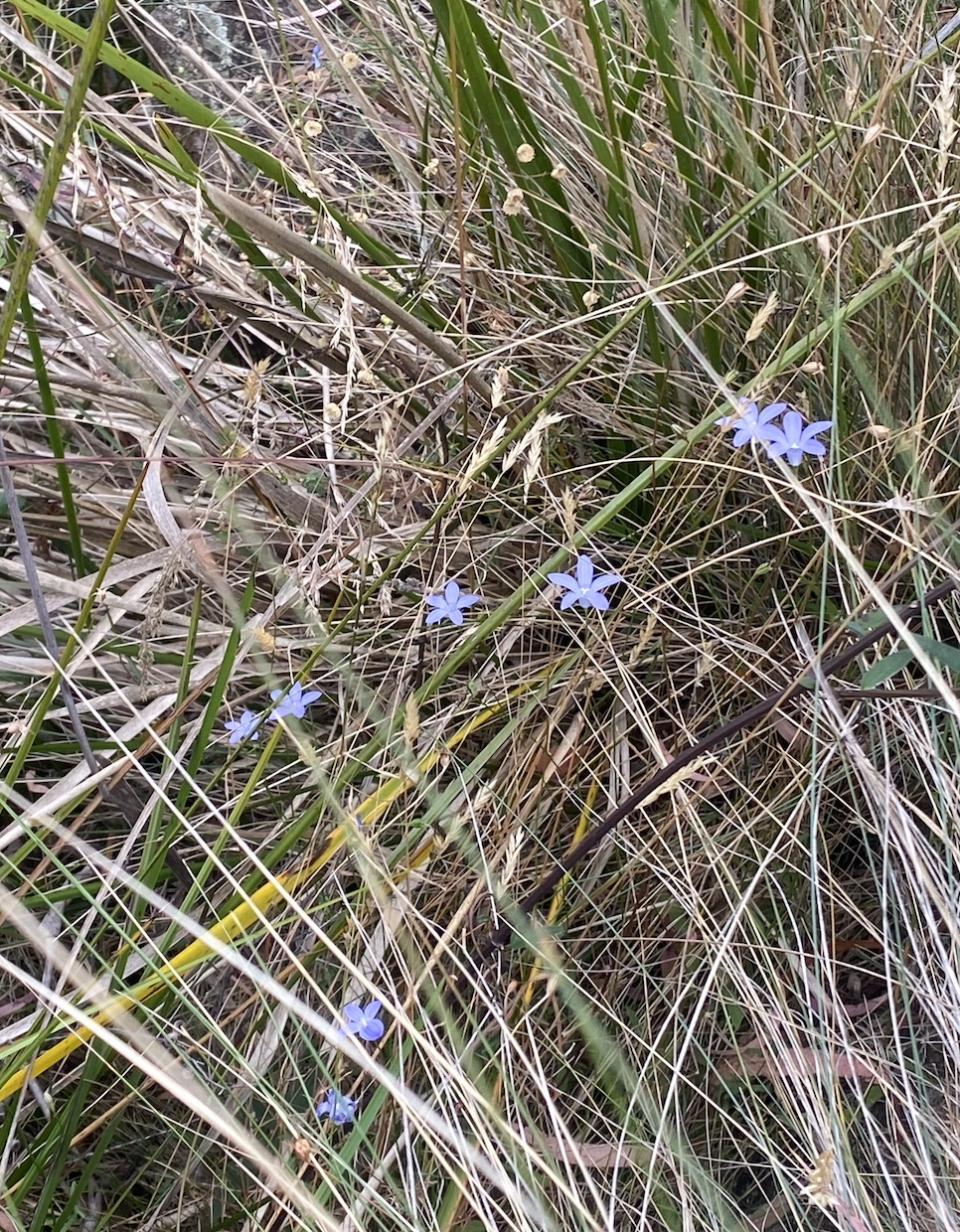
Wahlenbergia gracilis flowers amongst grass/sedges in central Tasmania

Wahlenbergia gracilis is a perennial, tufted herb ranging from 5 to 80cm in height which is usually erect or sprawling, and is multi-branched from basal stems. The stems branch from a thickened taproot. Leaves are alternate, or sometimes opposite near to the base of the stem. Leaves are usually obovate to narrowly elliptic on lower stem, and lanceolate to linear on the upper stem, commonly small between 2-60mm long and 0.2-10 mm wide. Margins are flat or can be undulate, usually entire or sometimes with small, callus-teeth or occasionally serrate. Leaves are glabrous, with lower leaves sometimes sparsely hirsute. Conspicuous flowers are in thyrsoids which make up the upper half of the plant, pedicels are between 2-11cm long and glabrous or sometimes sparsely hirsute. Bracteoles are linear and glabrous. Hypanthium is obconic to obovoid in shape and glabrous. W. gracilis usually has 5 sepals, but sometimes 3 or 4, usually 1-3mm long and narrowly triangular. The corolla is deeply campanulate in shape, 1-4.5mm long, blue/mauve in colour but sometimes pink or white, usually 5 lobes, but sometimes 3 or 4, elliptic to ovate, and 1.5 - 6mm long. Ovary is usually 3-locular or sometimes 2-locular. Flowers have been observed to open and close in response to light availability. Capsule is obconic to obovoid in shape, 2.5-7mm long, 1.5-3.5 mm wide, glabrous.

Wahlenbergia gracilis is sometimes difficult to distinguish from other Wahlenbergia species but is characterised by obconic to obovoid capsules, its perennial habit, and its deeply campanulate corolla.

== Habitat & distribution ==
Wahlenbergia gracilis is native to Australia, New Caledonia, New Guinea, New Zealand and Tonga. The Wahlenbergia genus is widespread throughout Australia. Wahlenbergia gracilis occurs mainly throughout eastern mainland Australia, although occurring throughout the continent.

Tolerant of many vegetation types, found in wet and dry forests, shrublands, woodlands and grasslands from moist but well-drained soil to poor, stony soils, and is well-adapted to disturbed sites. In Tasmania, it is commonly found in grasslands and grassy woodlands. Smith notes that a distinguishing feature of W. gracilis is that it is commonly found in mesic areas, meaning environments containing a moderate amount of water.

== Taxonomy ==
Wahlenbergia gracilis is an accepted species, first published in Monographie des Campanul?es 142 (1830). There are seventeen synonyms of the species, denoting some previous misidentification and difficulty in distinguishing Wahlenbergia species.

== Ecosystem value ==
Wahlenbergia gracilis has a fibrous root system which can be important in stabilizing soil and preventing erosion. It also plays an important role for a number of native pollinators, including native bee species and a number of butterflies notably Vanessa kershawi (Australian painted lady), Zizina labradus (common grass-blue) and Ogyris olane (Eastern bronze-azure). It may provide habitat and resources for a range of native insect.

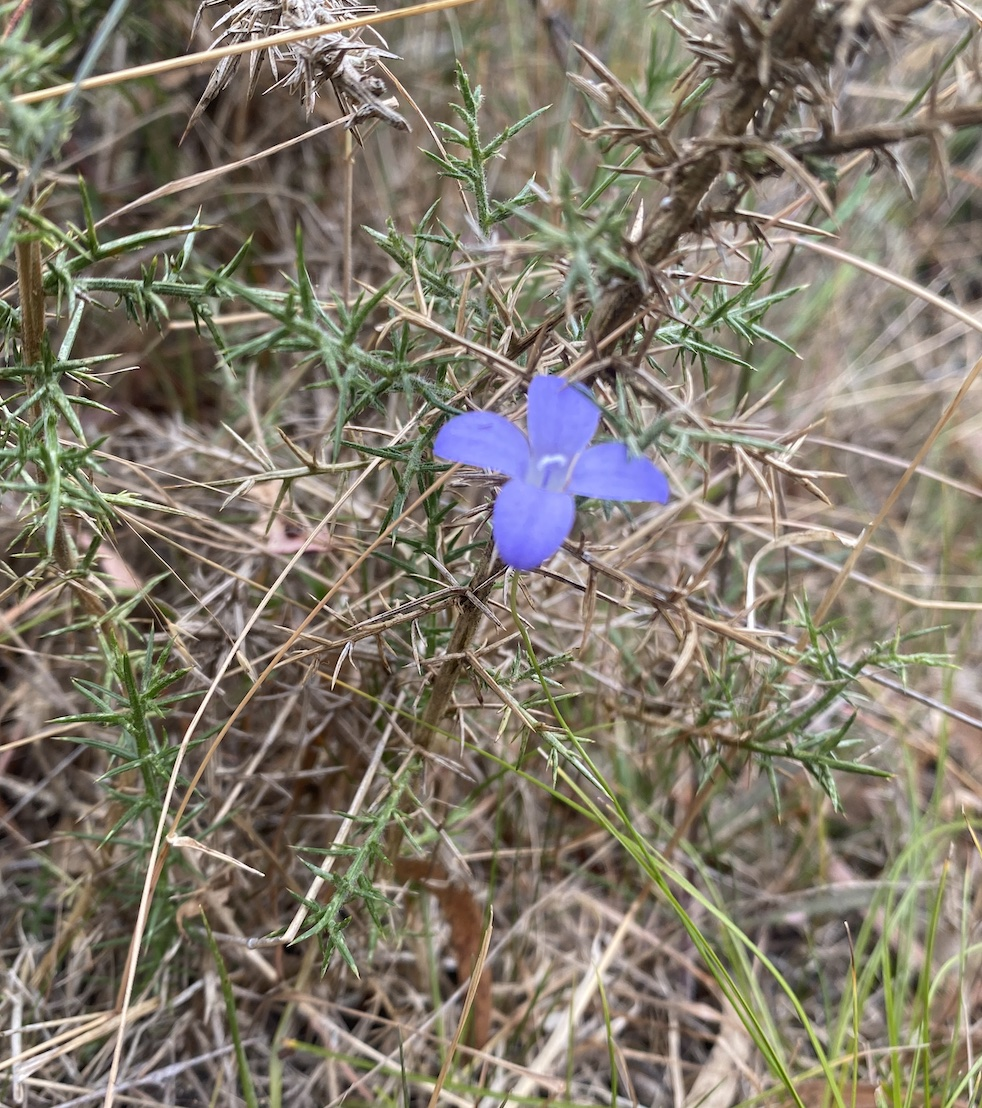
Alternative expression of 4-lobed W. gracilis photographed at Lake Crescent in central Tasmania.

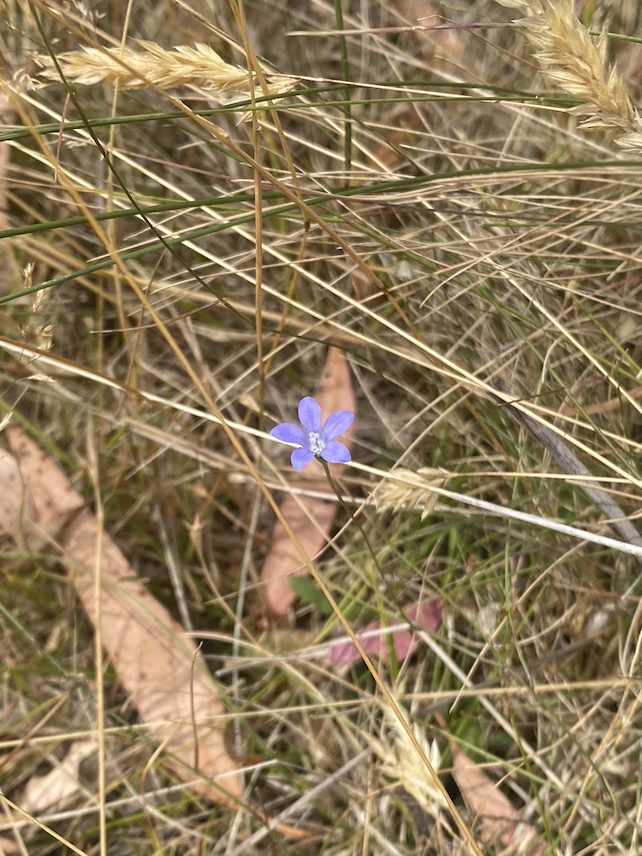
Wahlenbergia gracilis in grassy woodland adjacent to Lake Crescent in central Tasmania.

== See also ==
- List of vascular plants of Norfolk Island
- Sydney Turpentine-Ironbark Forest
- Flora of the Houtman Abrolhos
- Flora of New South Wales
