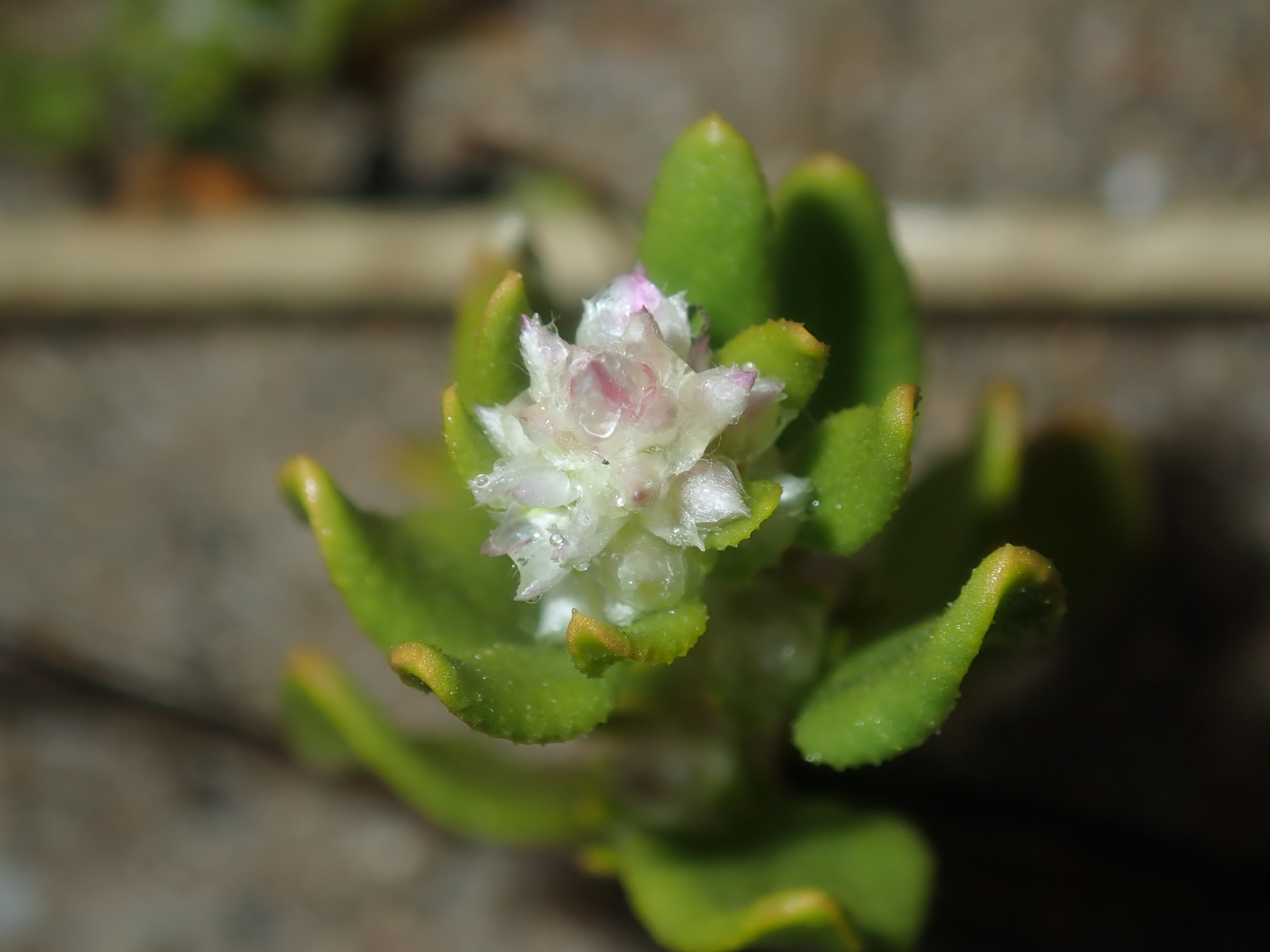
- In Kalbarri

Scientific classification
- Kingdom: Plantae
- Clade: Embryophytes
- Clade: Tracheophytes
- Clade: Spermatophytes
- Clade: Angiosperms
- Clade: Eudicots
- Order: Caryophyllales
- Family: Amaranthaceae
- Genus: Ptilotus
- Species: P. villosiflorus

Binomial name
- Ptilotus villosiflorus F.Muell.

Synonyms
- Alternanthera polycephala Benth.; Ptilotus macrotrichus F.Muell.; Trichinium macrotrichum (F.Muell.) Ewart & O.B.Davies; Trichinium macrotrichus Ewart & O.B.Davies orth. var.; Trichinium villosiflorum (F.Muell.) Ewart & O.B.Davies

= Ptilotus villosiflorus =

Species of plant

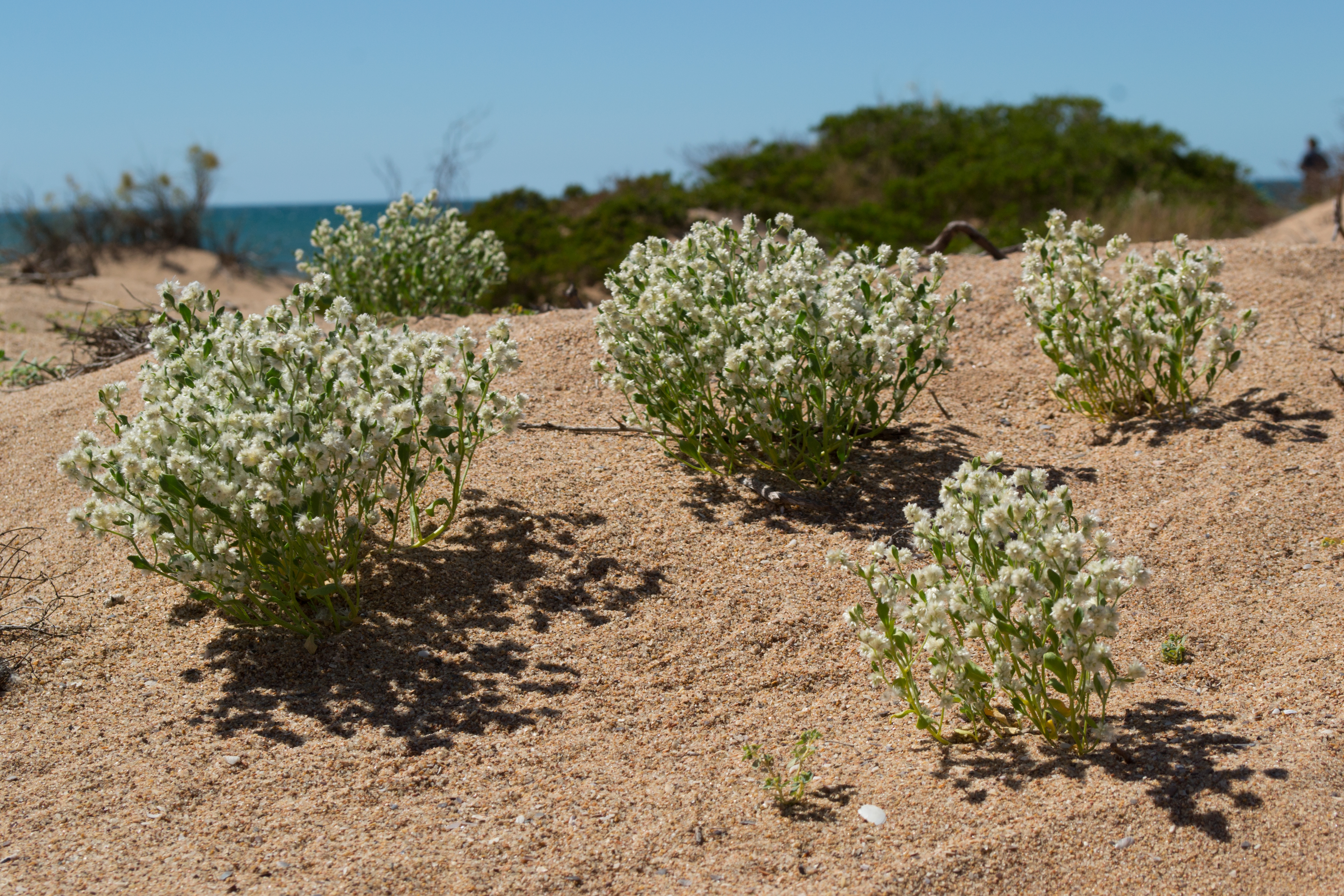
On a dune near Port Hedland

Ptilotus villosiflorus is a species of flowering plant of the family Amaranthaceae and is endemic to the north coast of Western Australia. It is a low-lying to ascending annual or perennial herb with sometimes hairy stem leaves and oval, hemispherical or spherical spikes of white, densely arranged flowers.

== Description ==
Ptilotus villosiflorus is a low-lying to ascending annual or perennial herb that typically grows up to 5–30 cm (2.0–11.8 in) tall and has hairy stems, at least at first, later glabrous. There is no rosette at the base of the plant. The stem leaves are arranged alternately, 5–55 mm (0.20–2.17 in) long and 2–18 mm (0.079–0.709 in) wide. The flowers are borne in white oval, hemispherical or spherical spikes on the ends of branches, with hairy bracts 2.8–3.4 mm (0.11–0.13 in) long and bracteoles 3.7–4.5 mm (0.15–0.18 in) long, both colourless, hairy, and with an obscure midrib. The outer tepals are 3–5 mm (0.12–0.20 in) long, and the inner tepals 2.8–4.8 mm (0.11–0.19 in) long and glabrous. The style is straight, 0.3–0.4 mm (0.012–0.016 in) long and fixed to the centre of the ovary. Flowering occurs from July to December and the seeds are glossy brown and about 1.2 mm (0.047 in) long.

== Taxonomy ==
Ptilotus villosiflorus was first formally described in 1862 by Ferdinand von Mueller in his Fragmenta Phytographiae Australiae from specimens collected during the 1861 expedition of Francis Thomas Gregory. The specific epithet (villosiflorus) means 'villous-flowered'.

== Distribution and habitat ==
This species of Ptilotus grows on coastal dunes and beaches in the Carnarvon, Dampierland, Geraldton Sandplains, Pilbara and Yalgoo bioregions of northern Western Australia.

== Conservation status ==
Ptilotus villosiflorus is listed as 'not threatened' by the Government of Western Australia Department of Biodiversity, Conservation and Attractions.
