= Wallabi Group =

Islands in Western Australia

Coordinates: 28°28′S 113°42′E

The Wallabi Group is the northernmost group of islands in the Houtman Abrolhos off the western coast of Western Australia. It is located 58 kilometres (36 miles) from the Australian mainland and about 9 kilometres (5.6 miles) from the Easter Group.

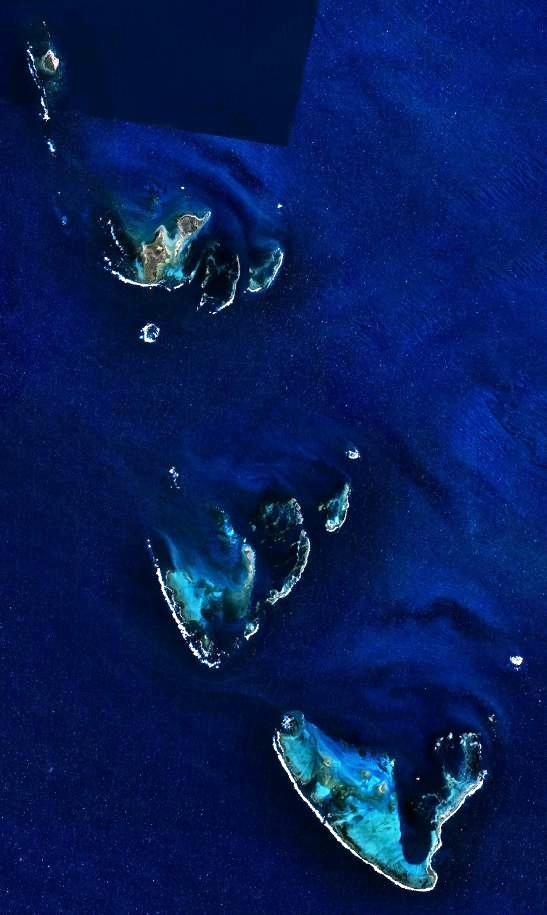
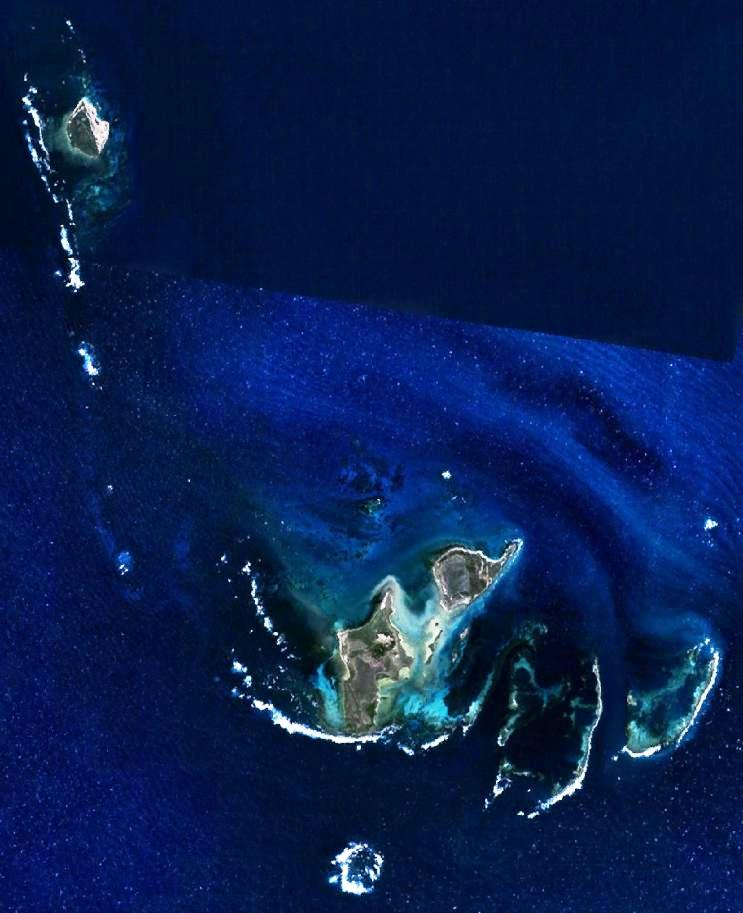
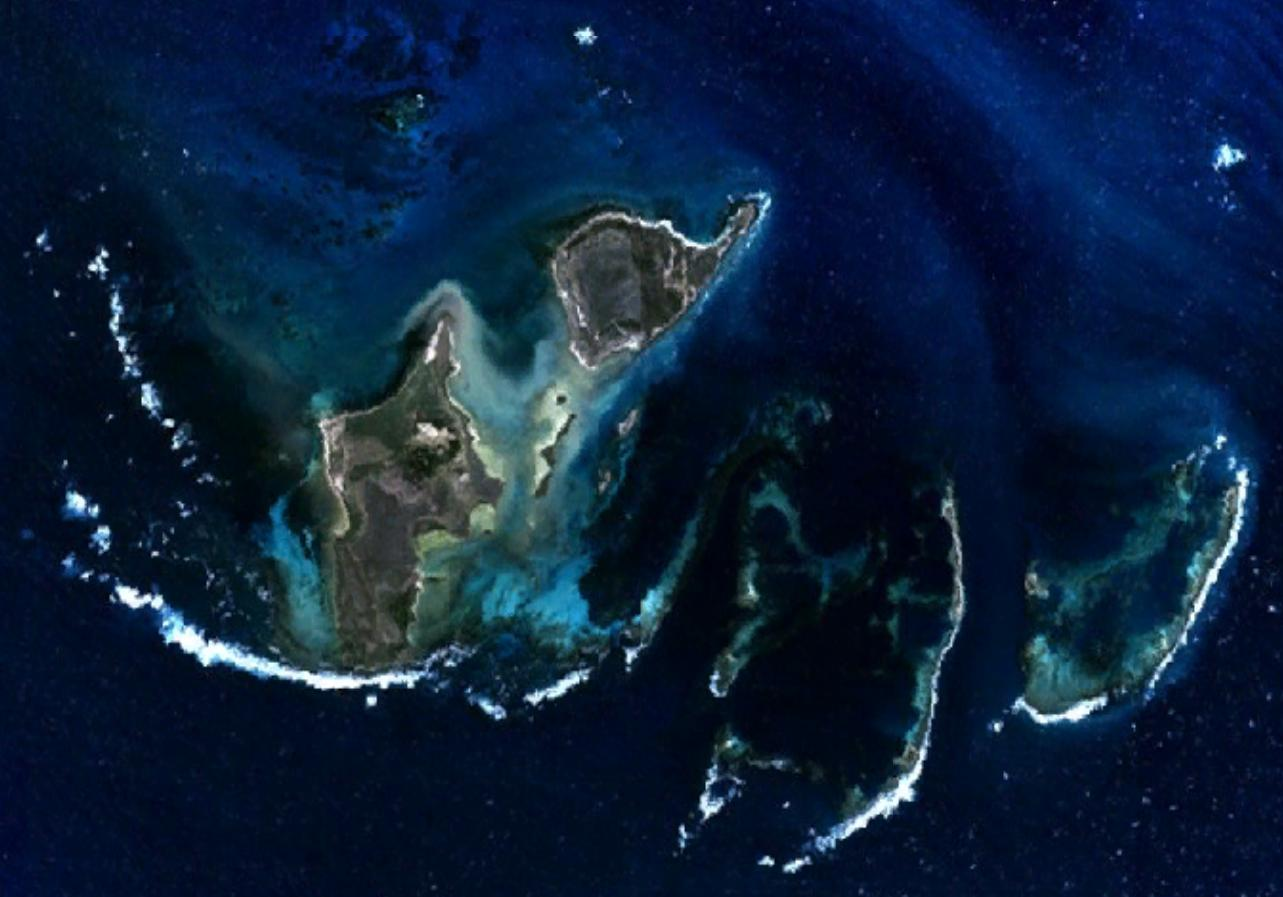

The group consists of a number of islands arising from a carbonate platform 17 kilometres (11 miles) long and up to 10 kilometres (6.2 miles) wide, and also the outlying North Island, located 14 kilometres (8.7 miles) to the northwest of the main platform. They are the most southerly well-established coral reef in the Indian Ocean. The main islands are North Island, West Wallabi Island, East Wallabi Island, Long Island and Beacon Island. The group is part of the Houtman Abrolhos Important Bird Area, recognized by BirdLife International for its importance to large numbers of breeding seabirds.

The Wallabi Group is best known for the shipwreck of the Batavia on Morning Reef near Beacon Island in 1629, and the subsequent mutiny and massacres that took place among the survivors. Another wreck for which the location is known is the Hadda, which wrecked off Beacon Island in April 1877 and now lies about a kilometre north of it.

== Components of the island group ==
- Acute Bank
- Assail Bank
- Beacon Island
- East Wallabi Island
- Long Island
- North Island
- North East Reef
- Pigeon Island (Houtman Abrolhos)
- Shag Rock (Houtman Abrolhos)
- South Passage (Houtman Abrolhos)
- Suda Bay Passage
- The Flat (Houtman Abrolhos)
- Traitors Island
- West Wallabi Island

== See also ==
- Easter Group
- Pelsaert Group
- List of islands in the Houtman Abrolhos
