= Atriplex bunburyana =

Scientific classification
- Kingdom: Plantae
- Clade: Tracheophytes
- Clade: Angiosperms
- Clade: Eudicots
- Order: Caryophyllales
- Family: Amaranthaceae
- Genus: Atriplex
- Species: A. bunburyana

Binomial name
- Atriplex bunburyana F.Muell.

Species of flowering plant

Atriplex bunburyana, commonly known as silver saltbush, is a species of saltbush endemic to Western Australia.

== Description ==
It grows as an erect shrub up to a metre high, with slender branches that are often straight and rigid. Leaves are oval in shape, five to 20 millimetres long, with a linear margin and a blueish colour caused by a thin scaly coating.

== Taxonomy ==
It was first published by Ferdinand von Mueller in 1882 under the name Atriplex bunburyanum, but this name was orthographically invalid and has been corrected to Atriplex bunburyana. The name refers to the collector of the type specimen, a Miss Bunbury, who collected specimens of this species from the Gascoyne River in 1882.

The species' only synonym is A. paludosa subsp. graciliflora, published by Paul Aellen in 1938.

== Distribution and habitat ==
Endemic to Western Australia, it occurs through most of the western half of the state, both near the coast and inland.
