= Silene nocturna =

Scientific classification
- Kingdom: Plantae
- Clade: Tracheophytes
- Clade: Angiosperms
- Clade: Eudicots
- Order: Caryophyllales
- Family: Caryophyllaceae
- Genus: Silene
- Species: S. nocturna

Binomial name
- Silene nocturna L.

Species of plant

Silene nocturna is a species of annual herb in the family Caryophyllaceae (carpetweeds). They have a self-supporting growth form and simple, broad leaves. Individuals can grow to 0.39 m.

== Sources ==
This article incorporates text from a free content work. Licensed under CC0 (license statement/permission). Text taken from Silene nocturna. Encyclopedia of Life.
