= Traitors Island =

Island in Western Australia

- Coordinates: 28°29′01″S 113°47′07″E
- Country: Australia
- State: Western Australia
- Established: 1629

Government
  - State electorate: Geraldton
  - Federal division: O'Connor

Population
  - Total: 0 (2011)

Traitors Island is an uninhabited island off the western coast of Australia, near the site of the Batavia shipwreck. About 50 metres long, it is situated near Beacon Island and is part of the Wallabi Group within the Houtman Abrolhos.

== History ==
The island received its name from those who were left behind by a number of the crew that set sail for Batavia after their ship of the same name ran aground on reef in 1629. Those who remained on the island felt so betrayed by the desertion of those who left for Batavia that they named the land Traitor's Island.
