= Suomi Island =

Island in Western Australia

- Location within Australia

Geography
- Location: Western Australia
- Coordinates: 28°42′42.01″S 113°50′22.92″E

Administration
- Australia

Suomi Island is an island off the coast of Western Australia. It is part of the Easter Group of islands of the Houtman Abrolhos. "Suomi" means Finland (or Finnish) in the Finnish language, but any relation between Finland and the island is unknown.
