= Kobbefjorden =

Fjord in Svalbard

Coordinates: 79°41′42″N 10°49′06″E

Kobbefjorden ("Seal Fjord") is a small fjord on the west coast of Danes Island, on the northwestern coast of Spitsbergen, the largest island of the Svalbard archipelago. The fjord is about two miles (3.5 km) long and 1-1.2 miles (1.5–2 km) wide. It offers one of the best anchorages on Spitsbergen's northwest coast, "being sheltered from most winds and ice-free for much of the year." At the head of the fjord is a valley, Kobbefjorddalen ("Seal Fjord Valley"), which leads to the east coast of Danes Island. Kobbefjorden's southwesternmost point is Luftskipodden ("Airship Point"). Sir Martin Conway, on his visit to Spitsbergen in 1896–97, described the fjord as having "ice-smoothed hills of [the] hardest rock."

== History ==
Kobbefjorden is merely a translation of the Dutch term for the fjord, Robbe Baai ('Seal Bay'), which appeared on Dutch maps from Michiel Hsz. Middelhoven's (1634) to that of Cornelis Giles and Outger Rep (c. 1710). The latter men added the alternative name Danes Bay, which Cornelis Gisbert Zorgdrager (1720) and William Scoresby (1820) copied. The Danes established a whaling station here in 1631, which was used until 1658. They called it Københavns Bay. The French, who called the bay Port St. Pierre, also attempted to use the bay as a base for whaling in 1632 and 1633, but were driven away by the Dutch. French and Dutch whaleships were held captive here by Danish warships in 1637 and 1638.

Later a post office was established by whalers on a small, low island at the entrance of the fjord, called Postholmen ('Post Office Island').

Adolf Erik Nordenskiöld, during some of his voyages to Spitsbergen, used Kobbefjorden as a port of refuge. In late May 1861 one of his expeditions spent several days anchored in the fjord, before attempting a passage north of Spitsbergen. In early September one of the expedition's vessels returned to the fjord on the heels of a coming storm. During their earlier visit, they had found a fresh-water lake covered with six feet of ice; it was now free of ice. The ship anchored here for several days, waiting for the storm to abate.

In 1868, Nordenskiöld had planned to wait at Kobbefjorden "for a favourable opportunity at the end of September or during October for sailing northwards" of Spitsbergen. On August 23, his ship, the Sofia, left a number of naturalists ashore within the fjord, before sailing north to review the state of the pack-ice. The Sofia returned to the fjord several days later, "where a violent snowstorm had almost put a stop to the work of the party that was left behind, but did not prevent a series of magnetic observations from being taken and some hitherto unknown insects [being] discovered." The Sofia left Kobbefjorden on August 31. She returned to the fjord on September 29, where she took "on board the remainder of the coal lying there". The ship left on October 1, again attempting to sail further north of Spitsbergen.
