= Morley Island =

Island in Western Australia

- Location within Australia

Geography
- Location: Western Australia
- Coordinates: 28°44′44.02″S 113°48′51.12″E

Administration
- Australia

Morley Island is one of the Easter Group of the Houtman Abrolhos islands, off the coast of the Mid West region of Western Australia.
