= Seal Island (Houtman Abrolhos) =

Island in Western Australia

Seal Island (28°29′1″S 113°48′7″E) is located in the Houtman Abrolhos archipelago in the Mid West region of Western Australia.
