= Wooded Island =

Island in Western Australia

- Location within Australia

Geography
- Location: Western Australia
- Coordinates: 28°45′4″S 113°48′25.92″E

Administration
- Australia

Wooded Island is an island off the coast of Western Australia. The area is 0.17 square kilometers.

It is part of the Easter Group of the Houtman Abrolhos.
