= Alexander Island (Houtman Abrolhos) =

Island in Western Australia

Coordinates: 28°40′26″S 113°49′44″E

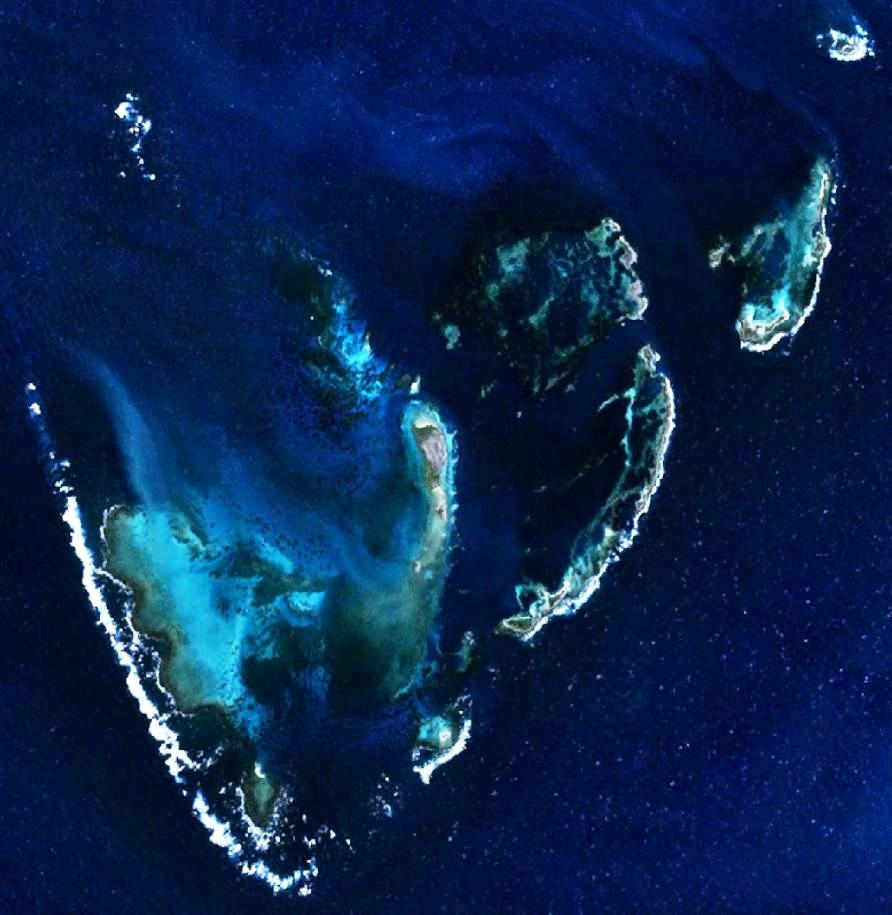

Alexander Island is one of the five largest islands in the Easter Group of the Houtman Abrolhos. The island is part of the Houtman Abrolhos Important Bird Area, identified as such by BirdLife International because of its importance for supporting large numbers of breeding seabirds.
