= Assail Bank =

Bank in South Passage off the coast of Western Australia

Assail Bank is a bank in South Passage of the Houtman Abrolhos, in the Indian Ocean off the coast of Western Australia.

It is nominally located at 28°20′45″S 113°41′3″E.
