= Rat Island (Houtman Abrolhos) =

Island in Western Australia

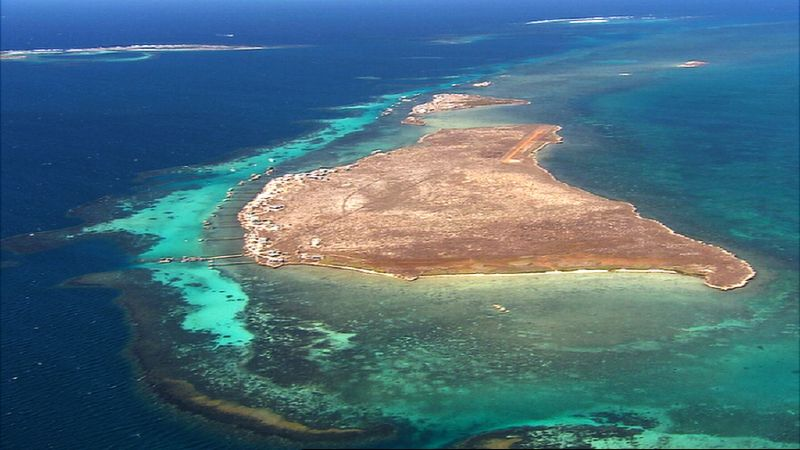
- Aerial view of Rat Island

- Location within Australia

Geography
- Location: Indian Ocean
- Coordinates: 28°42′54.9″S 113°47′05.3″E

Administration
- Australia
- State: Western Australia

Rat Island is an island off the coast of Western Australia. It is a part of the Easter Group of the Houtman Abrolhos.

It has been identified as a significant bird site.

== Transport ==
The jetty at the island had a railway line in the early 1900s, that had been utilized for some time during the exploitation of guano and lime deposits.

Rat Island is the location of Albrohos Rat Island Airport (ICAO: YRAT).
