= Pelsaert Group =

Islands in Western Australia

Coordinates: 28°54′S 113°54′E

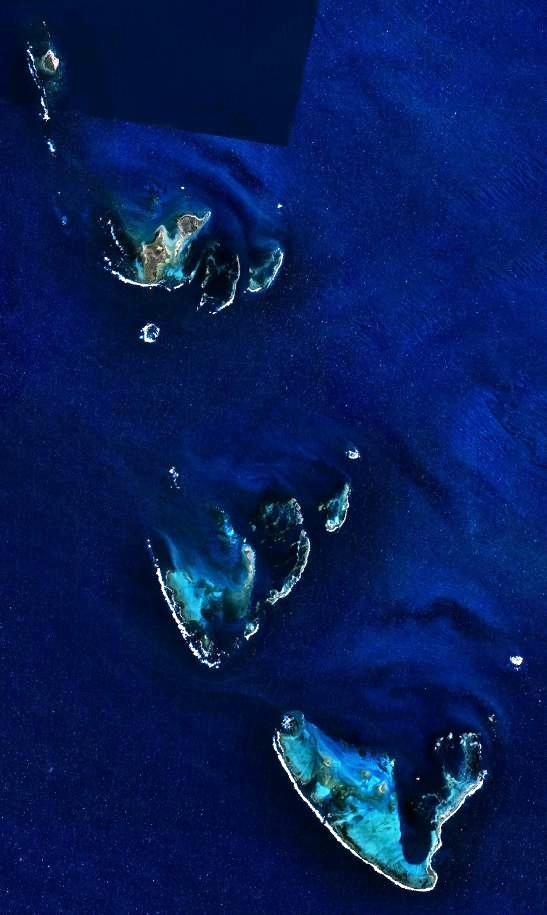
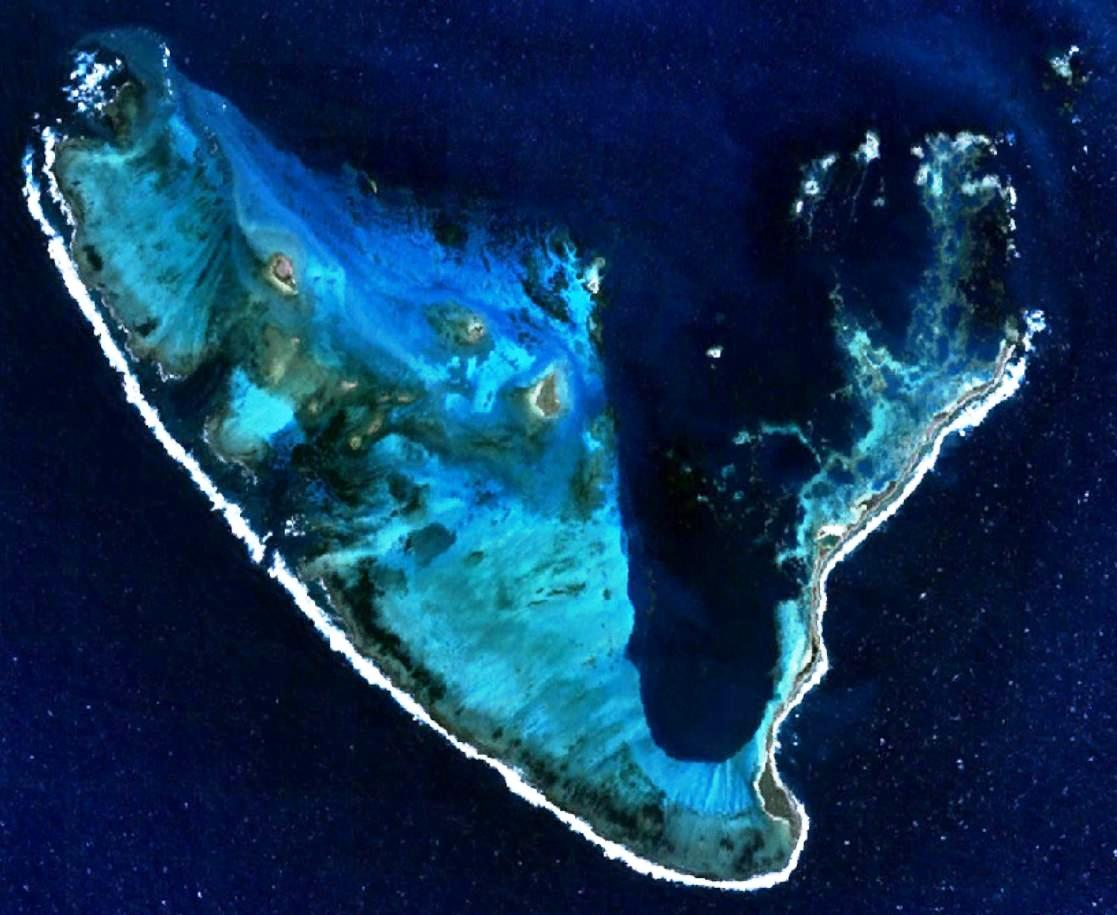

The Pelsaert Group is the southernmost of the three groups of islands that make up the Houtman Abrolhos island chain. It consists of a number of islands, the largest of which are Gun Island, Middle Island, and Pelsaert Island. The group is named after Francisco Pelsaert a Dutch opperkoopman ("high/supreme merchant"), who stranded nearby with the VOC-ship "Batavia" in 1629. The group contains the most southerly true coral reefs in the Indian Ocean. The group is part of the Houtman Abrolhos Important Bird Area, identified as such by BirdLife International because of its importance for supporting large numbers of breeding seabirds.

A great many ships have been wrecked in the Pelsaert Group. The most notable wreck is the Zeewijk, which was wrecked on the Half Moon Reef in 1727, the survivors staying on Gun Island for some time afterwards. Other wrecks include the Ocean Queen, wrecked on the Half Moon Reef in 1842; the Ben Ledi, wrecked off Pelsaert Island in 1879; and the Windsor, wrecked on the Half Moon Reef in 1908.

== See also ==
- Wallabi Group
- Easter Group
- List of islands of Western Australia
