= Turnstone Island =

Island in Western Australia

- Location within Australia

Geography
- Location: Western Australia
- Coordinates: 28°27′6.01″S 113°43′3″E

Administration
- Australia

Turnstone Island is an island off the coast of Western Australia. It is part of the Houtman Abrolhos.
