= Gun Island =

Island in Western Australia

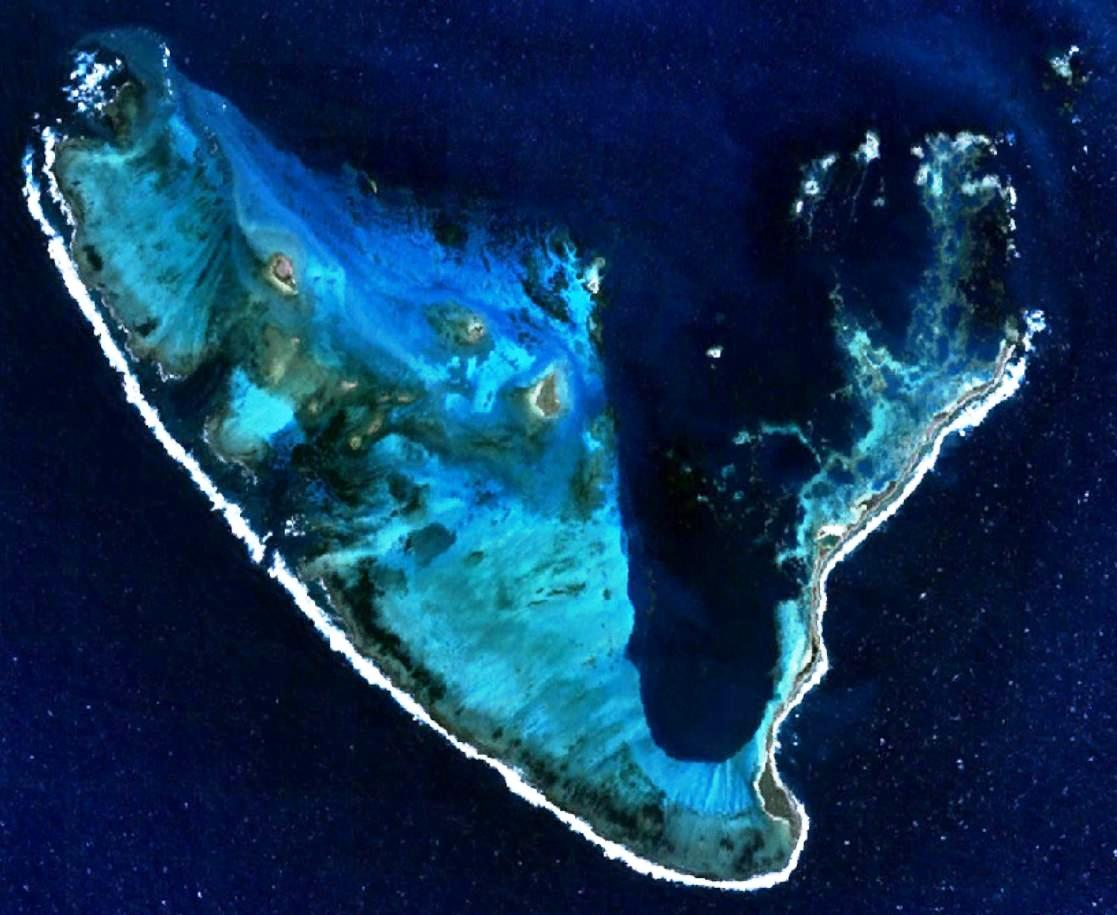

Gun Island is one of the larger islands in the Pelsaert Group of the Houtman Abrolhos, in the Indian Ocean off the west coast of Australia. It is nominally at 28°53′10″S 113°51′35″E, about 4 km (2.5 mi) north and east of Half Moon Reef and is a flat limestone outcrop of about 800 by 420 metres (2,620 by 1,380 ft) in size. The island is part of the Houtman Abrolhos Important Bird Area, identified as such by BirdLife International because of its importance for supporting large numbers of breeding seabirds.

== History ==
Between June 1727 and March 1728, crew of the Dutch VOC ship Zeewijk were stranded on the island after it struck Half Moon Reef. A longboat with 11 seamen that was dispatched to go for help failed to return and it is not known what became of them. The remaining survivors used their vessel's wreckage to construct a 20-metre (66 ft) sloop, which they named the Sloepie. Of the 88 crew who survived, 82 arrived in Batavia on 30 April 1728.

During Admiralty surveys of the north-west coast in 1840, the crew of HMS Beagle discovered a brass gun of about three pounds calibre and an iron swivel gun on which paint was still adhered. Captain Stokes, with Commander John Clements Wickham, named the place Gun Island. They also discovered several coins, including one dated about 1707 and another dated 1720. Also seen was what appeared to be the beam of a ship with an iron bolt through it, and glass bottles and clay pipes. The material was presumed to have been left there by the Zeewijk castaways 112 years earlier.

In 1883, Charles Edward Broadhurst, who had been granted a lease for guano export, discovered several campsites, as well as the bones of seals which had evidently been killed for sustenance by the crew of the Zeewijk.

Gun Island was one of the islands of the Abrolhos most heavily worked for guano. Guano workings continued on a commercial scale from the 1880s to the 1920s, and again in the mid-1940s. A 100-metre (330 ft) stone jetty on the south-eastern corner, built for loading guano, remains intact.

The yacht Nautilus was wrecked at Gun Island in 1897.

From June to November 1968, a stratigraphic test well was drilled on Gun Island (28º53'30.11"S, 113º51'27.0"E) by BP Petroleum Development Australia. It was drilled within the Perth Basin and reached a total depth (TD) of 3,725 m (12,221 ft). The extent of the drilling platform near the wharf can be seen on satellite images.

== Archaeology ==
In 1974, an archaeological expedition was made to the island by members of the Western Australian Museum.

Gun Island is classified as having "High" conservation significance and is one of the seven protected zones in the Abrolhos Islands. Protected zone restrictions mean that "visitors shall not carry out any digging or major earthworks within the zones around declared maritime archaeological sites unless permitted to do so", and that they shall also not take metal detecting devices onto the island.

A 20-metre (66 ft)-wide rock called Gun Islet is about 30 metres (98 ft) off the southern tip of the island.
