= Oystercatcher Island =

Island in Western Australia

- Location within Australia

Geography
- Location: Western Australia
- Coordinates: 28°27′45″S 113°42′52.92″E

Administration
- Australia

Oystercatcher Island is an island off the coast of Western Australia. It is part of the Houtman Abrolhos.
