= Middle Island (Houtman Abrolhos) =

Island in Western Australia

Middle Island, Australia
- Island
- Location within Western Australia
- Coordinates: 28°54′31″S 113°54′36″E
- Country: Australia
- Island Chain: Houtman Abrolhos
- Island Group: Pelsaert Group

Middle Island is one of the largest islands of the Pelsaert Group of the Houtman Abrolhos off the coast of the Mid West region of Western Australia.
