= Easter Group =

Islands in the Houtman Abrolhos in Western Australia

Coordinates: 28°44′S 113°46′E

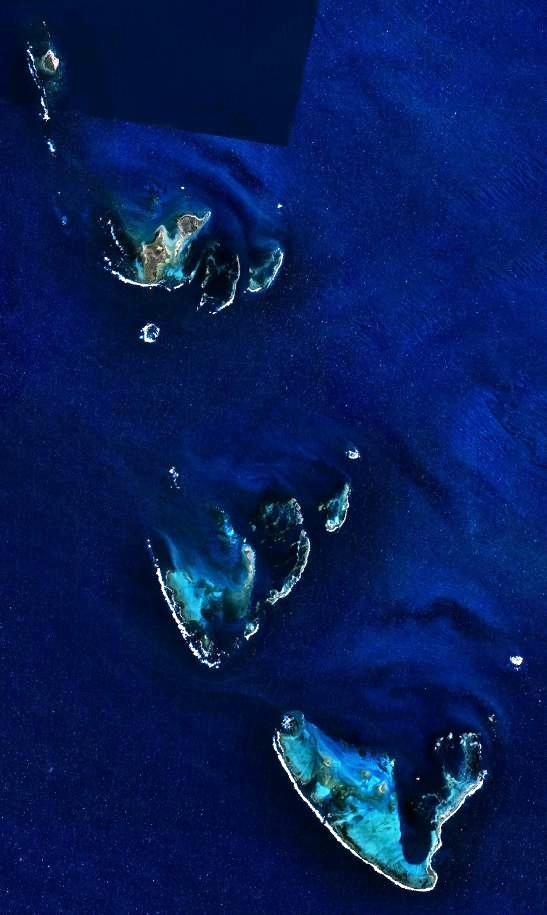
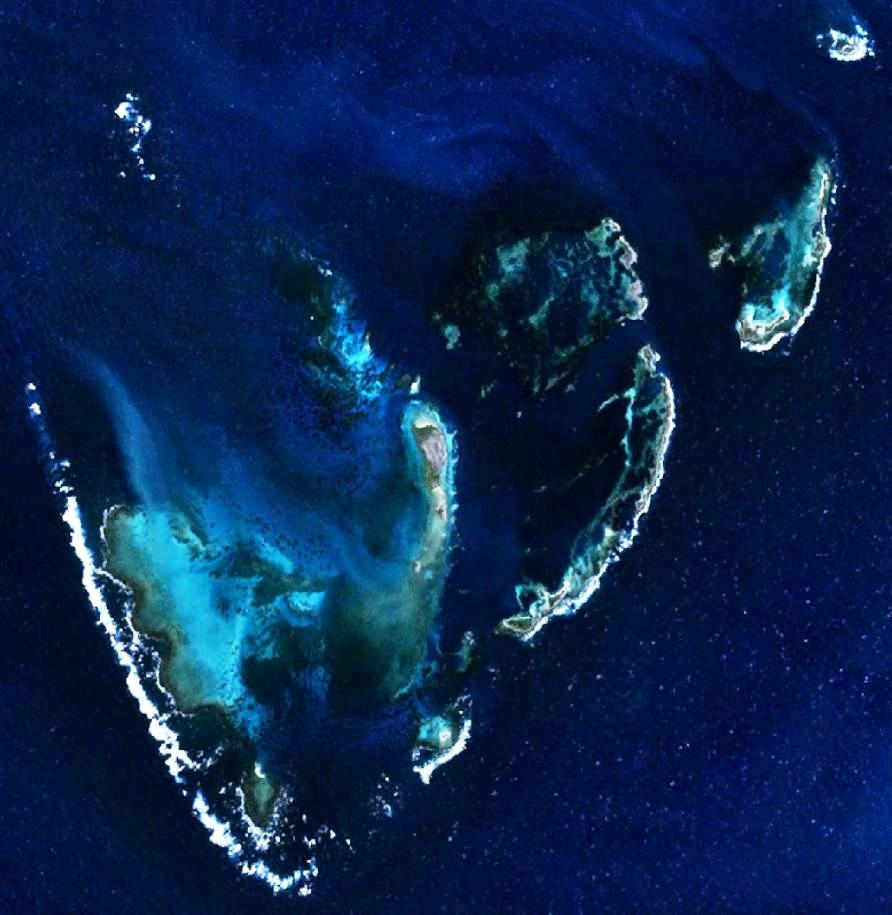

The Easter Group is the central of three groups of islands that make up the Houtman Abrolhos island chain. The group measures about 20 kilometres by 12 kilometres, and consists of a number of islands including

- Rat Island
- Wooded Island
- Morley Island
- Suomi Island
- Alexander Island.

Unlike the other groups the Easter Group has few shipwrecks. The group is part of the Houtman Abrolhos Important Bird Area, identified as such by BirdLife International because of its importance for supporting large numbers of breeding seabirds.

The group was discovered and named in April 1840 by the crew of HMS Beagle, under the command of John Clements Wickham. Stoke's journal, published as Discoveries in Australia in 1846, records the following for April 11:

"At daylight we found that the summit of a large island, in the centre of the group to the northward, bore N. 21½° W. about nine miles. We now beat to the southward in search of a harbour, where the ship might lie in safety whilst we went to work with the boats, and were fortunate enough to discover one close to the north-east point of a large island lying in the centre of the group to the southward; which we named Easter Group, and the harbour Good Friday Harbour, to commemorate the season of the Christian year, at which we visited it. Perhaps at some future period, when the light of the gospel shall have penetrated to every part of the vast Australian continent, these sacred names, bestowed by us upon some of its outworks, may be pronounced with pleasure, as commemorative of the time when the darkness of ignorance and superstition was just beginning to disperse."

== See also ==
- Wallabi Group
- Pelsaert Group
- List of islands of Western Australia
