= East Wallabi Island =

Island in Houtman Abrolhos islands in Western Australia

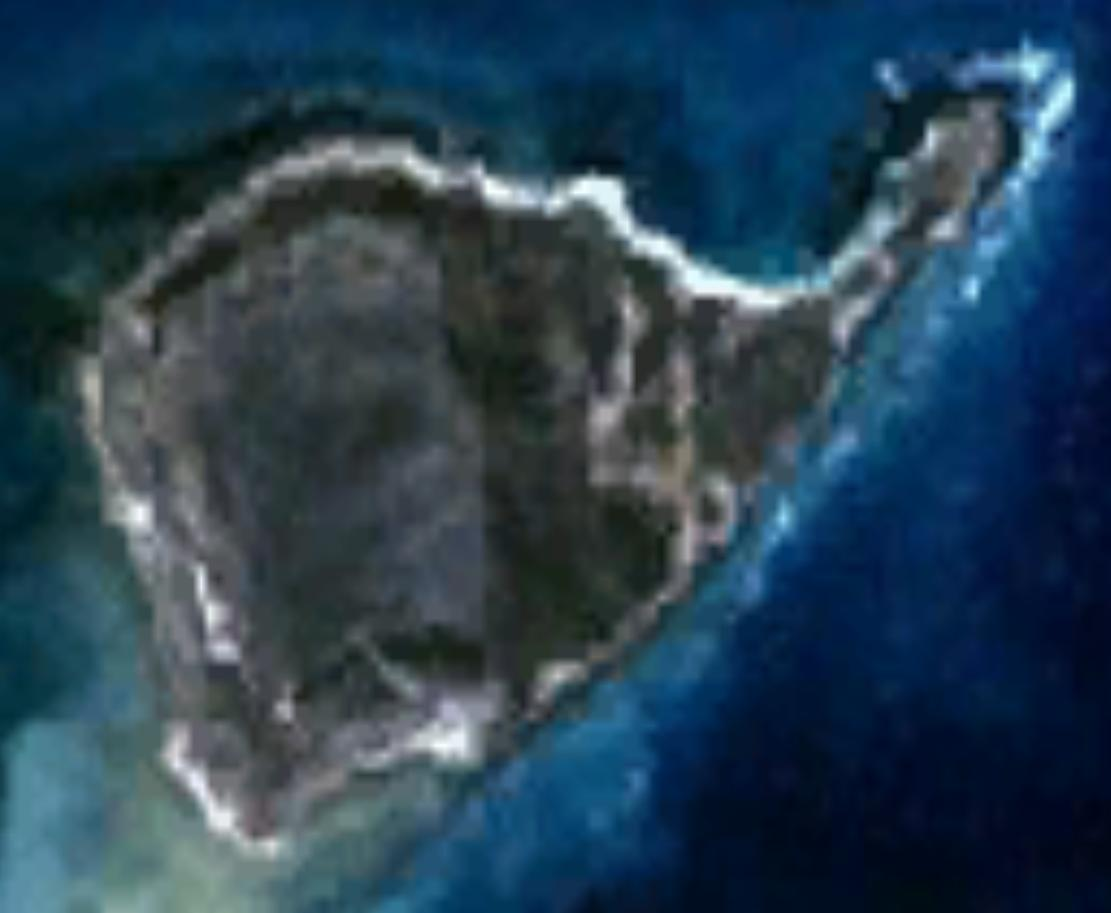
- Satellite image
- Interactive map of East Wallabi Island

Geography
- Location: Indian Ocean, off the coast of Western Australia
- Coordinates: 28°26′23″S 113°43′33″E
- Archipelago: Houtman Abrolhos
- Area: 3.21 km^{2} (1.24 sq mi)
- Length: 3.3 km (2.05 mi)
- Width: 1.8 km (1.12 mi)
- Highest elevation: 15 m (49 ft)
- Highest point: Flag Hill

Administration
- Australia
- State: Western Australia

Demographics
- Population: Uninhabited

East Wallabi Island is an island in the Wallabi Group of the Houtman Abrolhos in the Indian Ocean off the west coast of mainland Australia.

== History ==
East Wallabi Island played an important role in the story of the Batavia shipwreck and massacre. Following the shipwreck, a group of soldiers under the command of Wiebbe Hayes were put ashore on West Wallabi Island to search for water. The mutineers, under the lead of Jeronimus Cornelisz, left Hayes' soldiers there in the hope that they would starve or die of thirst. However, the soldiers discovered that they were able to wade to East Wallabi Island, where they eventually discovered a fresh water spring. Furthermore, West and East Wallabi Island are the only islands in the group upon which the tammar wallabi lives. Thus the soldiers had access to sources of both food and water that were unavailable to the mutineers.

In the context of the Batavia mutiny and massacre, East Wallabi Island is often referred to as "High island". This was the name given it in contemporary sources, and was used by historians for as long as it remained a lost toponym.

== Geography ==
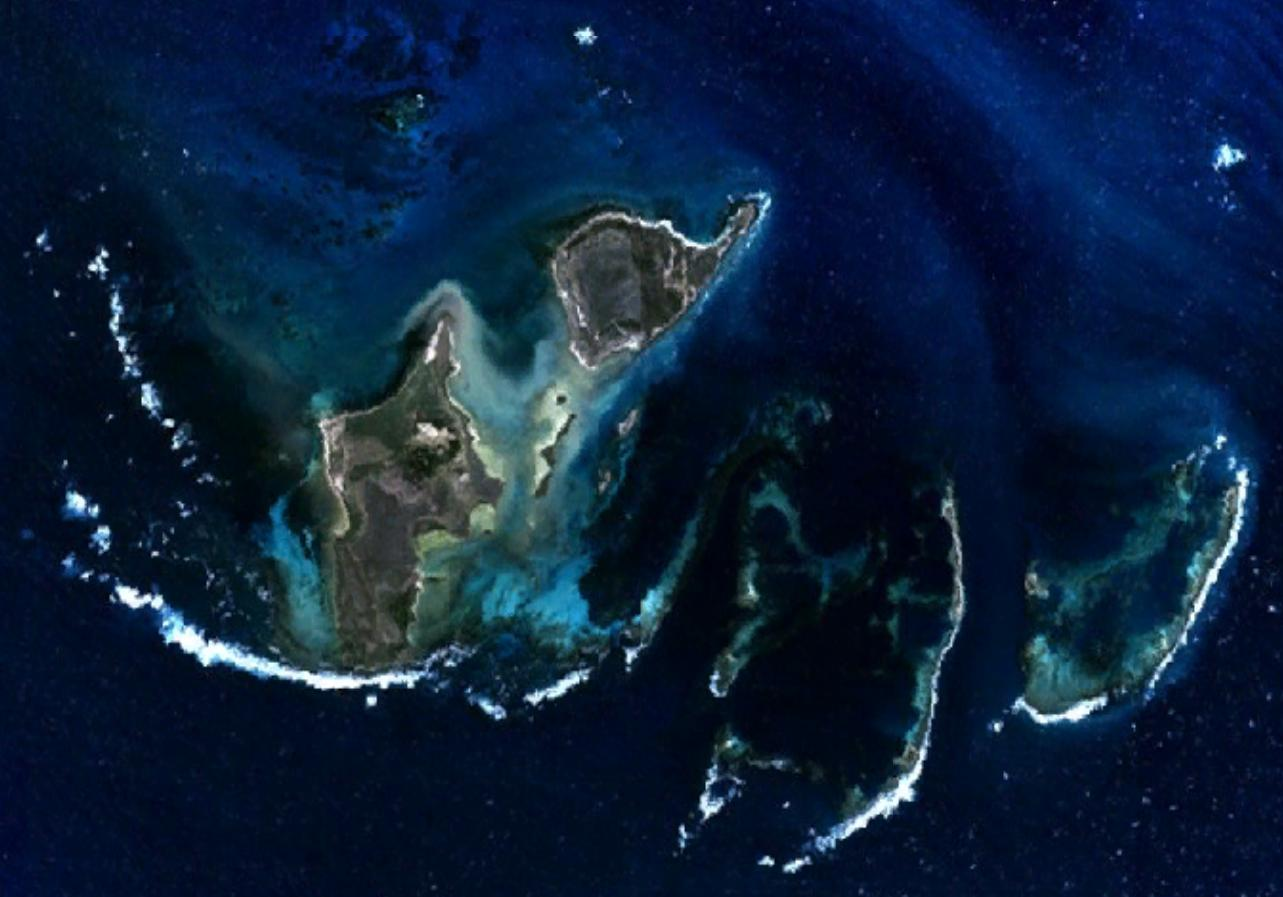
The Wallabi Group (excluding North Island) from space

Nominally located at 28°26′23″S 113°43′33″E, East Wallabi Island is the second-largest island in Houtman Abrolhos archipelago, after West Wallabi Island. It is roughly circular in shape, except for Fish Point in the north-east. It is approximately 3.3 kilometres (2.1 mi) long (along the south-eastern edge) and about 1.8 kilometres (1.1 mi) wide, giving it an area of about 321 hectares (790 acres).

There are two named hills on the island. Flag Hill is located in the north-east of the island, at the foot of Fish Point; at 15 metres (49 ft), it is the highest point in the Houtman Abrolhos. In the south-east is another hill, named Eagle Hill. Other named localities include Fish Point and, on the point's western side, Turtle Bay. Immediately to the west of Flag Hill is an airstrip.

The island is surrounded by submerged coral reef. This is narrow along the west, north and east shores, giving way to open ocean to the west and north. Beyond the reef on the east side of the island lies Pigeon Island Anchorage, the main passage and anchorage for Pigeon Island, a small island 1 kilometre (0.62 mi) to the south that is used as a seasonal camp for the Western Rock Lobster fishery. To the south, the reef is extensive, and much of it is high enough that a person may wade from island to island; islands connected to East Wallabi Island in this way include Barge Rock, Turnstone Island, Seagull Island, Oystercatcher Island and West Wallabi Island.

=== Geology and physiography ===
The basement of East Wallabi Island is the Wallabi Limestone, a dense calcretised, coral limestone platform that underlies the entire Wallabi Group. This platform, which arises abruptly from a flat shelf, is about 40 metres (130 ft) thick, and is of Quaternary origin. Reef that formed during the Eemian interglacial (about 125,000 years ago), when sea levels were higher than at present, are now emergent in places, and constitute the basement of the group's central platform islands, which include East Wallabi Island.

The basement is capped by aeolianite. This ranges from one to three metres (3 ft 3 in to 9 ft 10 in) thick, and forms an almost continuous pavement on the western half of the island. The aeolianite is in turn overlain by sand dunes. These are discontinuous in western and northern parts of the island, but in the south-west and east they are extensive and consolidated.

== Flora ==
As one of the few islands in the Houtman Abrolhos large enough to support dune systems, East Wallabi Island supports a relatively high diversity of plant life. Both the dunes and the pavement limestone support species-rich vegetation complexes dominated by chenopod shrubs, and these communities have been identified as having species conservation importance, because they are so diverse, yet so easily disturbed and so slow to recover.

According to a survey published in 2001, 124 plant species occur on East Wallabi Island, the most of any island in the archipelago:

- Acacia didyma
- Acanthocarpus preissii
- Actinobole condensatum
- Alyxia buxifolia (Dysentery Bush)
- Angianthus tomentosus (Camel-grass)
- Aphanopetalum clematideum
- Apium annuum
- Atriplex cinerea (Grey Saltbush)
- Atriplex sp.
- Austrodanthonia caespitosa
- Austrostipa elegantissima
- Austrostipa variabilis
- Beyeria viscosa (Pinkwood)
- Bossiaea spinescens
- Brachyscome ciliaris
- Brachyscome iberidifolia
- Bromus arenarius (Sand Brome)
- Bulbine semibarbata (Leek Lily)
- Cakile maritima (Sea Rocket) (naturalised)
- Calocephalus aervoides (Woolly Beautyheads)
- Capparis spinosa (Coastal Caper)
- Carpobrotus virescens (Coastal Pigface)
- Chenopodium melanocarpum (Black Crumbweed)
- Chenopodium nitrariaceum (Nitre Goosefoot)
- Crassula colorata (Dense Stonecrop)
- Cynodon dactylon (Couch) (naturalised)
- Cynoglossum australe (Australian Hound's-tongue)
- Daucus glochidiatus (Australian Carrot)
- Dianella revoluta (Blueberry Lily)
- Diplolaena grandiflora (Wild Rose)
- Dodonaea aptera (Coast Hopbush)
- Dodonaea inaequifolia
- Dysphania plantaginella
- Echium plantagineum (Paterson's Curse) (naturalised)
- Ehrharta brevifolia (Annual Veldtgrass) (naturalised)
- Enchylaena tomentosa (Barrier Saltbush)
- Epilobium billardiereanum (Glabrous Willow Herb)
- Eragrostis dielsii (Mallee Lovegrass)
- Eremophila deserti
- Eremophila glabra (Tar Bush)
- Erodium cicutarium (Common Storksbill) (naturalised)
- Erodium cygnorum (Blue Heronsbill)
- Eucalyptus oraria (Ooragmandee)
- Euchiton sphaericus
- Euphorbia drummondii (Caustic Weed)
- Exocarpos aphyllus (Leafless Ballart)
- Frankenia pauciflora (Seaheath)
- Galium migrans
- Gnaphalium indutum (Tiny Cudweed)
- Grevillea argyrophylla (Silvery-leaved Grevillea)
- Haloragis trigonocarpa
- Helichrysum luteoalbum (Jersey Cudweed) (naturalised)
- Hibbertia racemosa (Stalked Guinea Flower)
- Hornungia procumbens (Oval Purse)
- Hydrocotyle diantha
- Isolepis marginata (Coarse Clubrush) (naturalised)
- Juncus bufonius (Toad Rush) (naturalised)
- Lachnagrostis filiformis (Blown Grass)
- Lasiopetalum angustifolium (Narrow Leaved Lasiopetalum)
- Leucopogon insularis
- Malva parviflora (Marshmallow) (naturalised)
- Malva preissiana (Australian Hollyhock)
- Mesembryanthemum crystallinum (Iceplant) (naturalised)
- Microtis media (Tall Mignonette Orchid)
- Microtis sp.
- Mirbelia ramulosa
- Muellerolimon salicorniaceum
- Myoporum insulare (Blueberry Tree)
- Nicotiana occidentalis subsp. hesperis (Native Tobacco)
- Nitraria billardierei (Nitre Bush)
- Olearia axillaris (Coastal Daisybush)
- Opercularia vaginata (Dog Weed)
- Orobanche minor (Less Broom Rape) (naturalised)
- Oxalis corniculata (Yellow Wood Sorrel) (naturalised)
- Parietaria debilis (Pellitory)
- Pelargonium littorale
- Phyllanthus calycinus (False Boronia)
- Pimelea microcephala (Shrubby Riceflower)
- Pittosporum phillyreoides (Weeping Pittosporum)
- Plantago debilis
- Poa annua (Winter Grass) (naturalised)
- Poa poiformis (Coastal Poa)
- Polycarpon tetraphyllum (Fourleaf Allseed) (naturalised)
- Polypogon tenellus
- Ptilotus divaricatus (Climbing Mulla-mulla)
- Ptilotus eriotrichus
- Ptilotus gaudichaudii
- Ptilotus obovatus (Cotton Bush)
- Ranunculus sessiliflorus (Smallflower Buttercup)
- Rhagodia baccata (Berry Saltbush)
- Sagina apetala (Annual Pearlwort) (naturalised)
- Salsola kali (Prickly Saltwort) (naturalised)
- Sarcocornia quinqueflora (beaded samphire)
- Sarcostemma viminale subsp. australe
- Scaevola crassifolia (Thick-leaved Fan-flower)
- Schenkia australis (naturalised)
- Senecio glossanthus (Slender Groundsel)
- Senecio pinnatifolius
- Setaria dielsii (Diels' Pigeon Grass)
- Sida spodochroma
- Solanum laciniatum (Kangaroo Apple) (naturalised)
- Solanum nigrum (Black Berry Nightshade) (naturalised)
- Solanum symonii
- Sonchus oleraceus (Common Sowthistle) (naturalised)
- Spergularia rubra (Sand Spurry) (naturalised)
- Spinifex longifolius (Beach Spinifex)
- Spyridium globulosum (Basket Bush)
- Stackhousia sp.
- Suaeda australis (Seablite)
- Tecticornia arbuscula
- Tecticornia halocnemoides (Shrubby Samphire)
- Threlkeldia diffusa (Coast Bonefruit)
- Thysanotus patersonii
- Trachymene pilosa (Native Parsnip)
- Triglochin muelleri
- Triglochin trichophora
- Tripterococcus brunonis
- Urospermum picroides (False Hawkbit) (naturalised)
- Urtica urens (Small Nettle) (naturalised)
- Vittadinia cuneata var. cuneata (Woolly Vittadinia)
- Vittadinia sp.
- Vulpia myuros (Rat's Tail Fescue) (naturalised)
- Westringia dampieri
- Wurmbea monantha
- Zygophyllum simile

== Birds ==
The island is part of the Houtman Abrolhos Important Bird Area, identified as such by BirdLife International because of its importance for supporting large numbers of breeding seabirds.
