= Smallflower buttercup =

Smallflower buttercup or small-flowered buttercup is a common name for several plants and may refer to:

- Ranunculus abortivus
- Ranunculus parviflorus
- Ranunculus sessiliflorus
