= Fish Point =

Fish Point may refer to:

- Fish Point (Queensland), a point
- Fish Point (South Australia), a point
- Fish Point (Tasmania), a point
- Fish Point, Victoria, a locality
- Fish Point (Houtman Abrolhos), Western Australia, a locality
- Livingston, Kentucky, in the United States, a city formerly known as Fish Point
