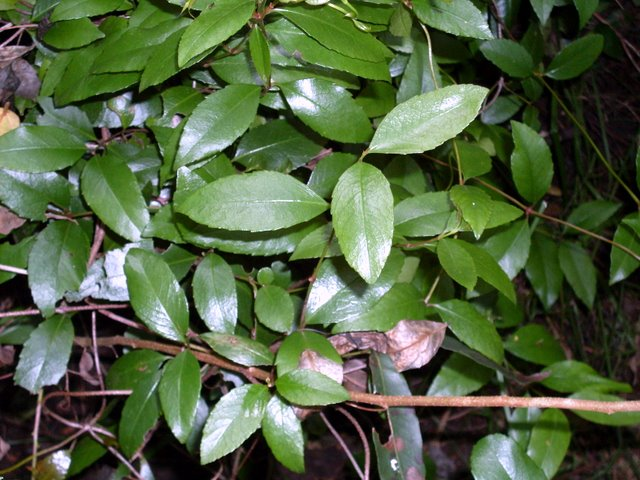
- Gum vine, Eastwood, Australia

Scientific classification
- Kingdom: Plantae
- Clade: Tracheophytes
- Clade: Angiosperms
- Clade: Eudicots
- Order: Saxifragales
- Family: Aphanopetalaceae
- Genus: Aphanopetalum
- Species: A. resinosum

Binomial name
- Aphanopetalum resinosum Endl.

= Aphanopetalum resinosum =

Gum vine

Species of flowering plant

Aphanopetalum resinosum, known as the gum vine, is a rambling vine growing in rainforest or eucalyptus woodland in eastern Australia. In Victoria it is listed as "vulnerable", being known only from a single collection near Mallacoota.

== Description ==
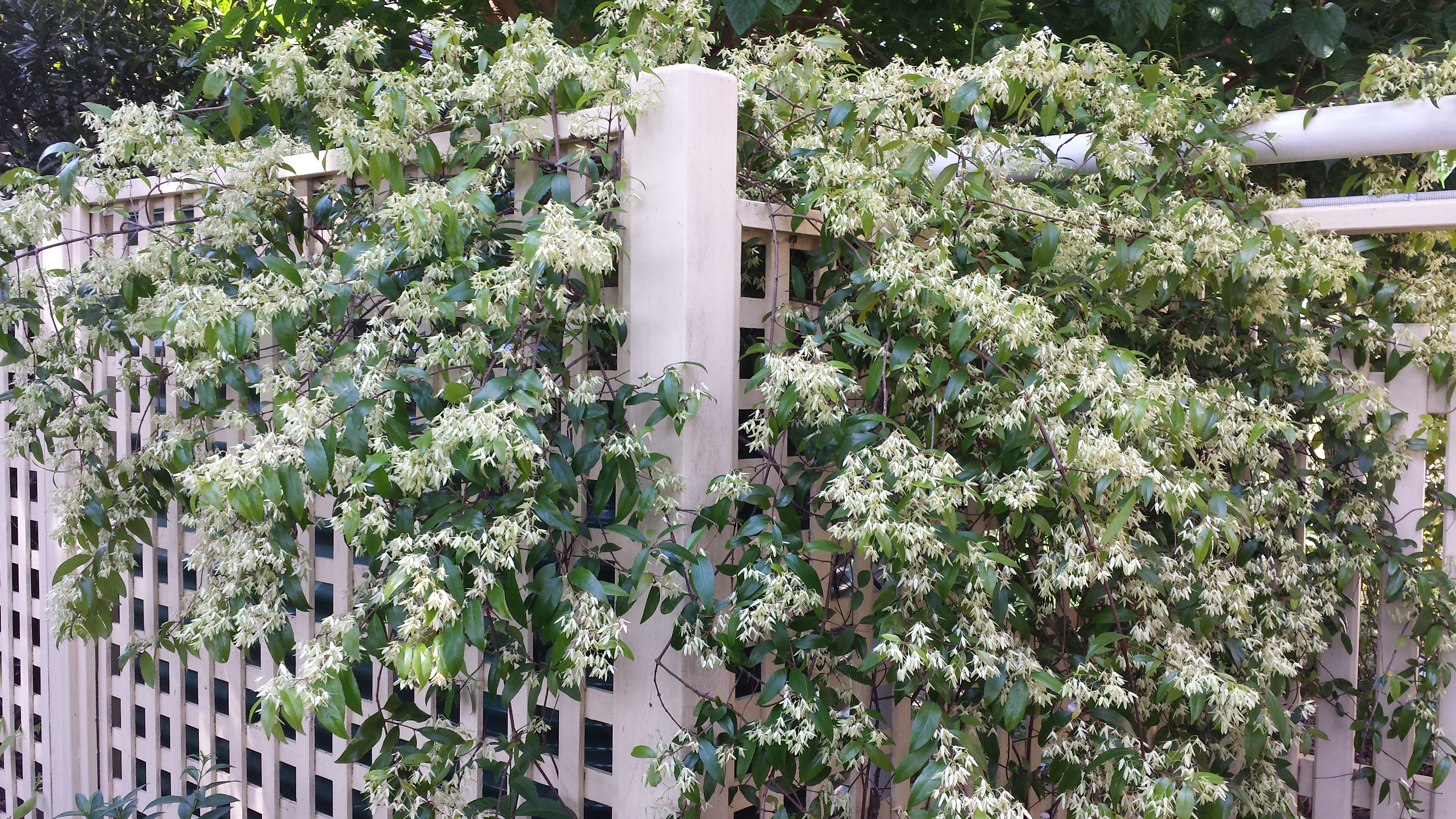
Cultivated in a garden

Usually a vine or a rambling shrub growing in moist areas. Leaves 4 to 8 cm long, 1.5 to 3 cm wide, wavy edged or toothed. Leaf shape varies from ovate to lanceolate. Leaf stem 2 to 5 mm long. The stem is hairless and is marked with lenticels (or raised resinous dots).

Four petalled, greenish-yellow flowers, which appear in spring and summer, form on cymes, petals 1 to 3 mm long. The petals are actually the sepals which grow to enwrap the fruit as it develops. The fruit is a nut, 2 to 3 mm long, which is encircled by the continual calyx.

== Distribution ==
It grows in rainforest or eucalypt forest of eastern Australia, from northeastern Victoria, through New South Wales to northern Queensland, where it occurs in wetlands, rainforests and in riparian zones within open woodlands. It is common north of Nadgee Nature Reserve. It is a twining climber in most rainforests and usually a straggling shrub in more open areas or along streams in woodlands.

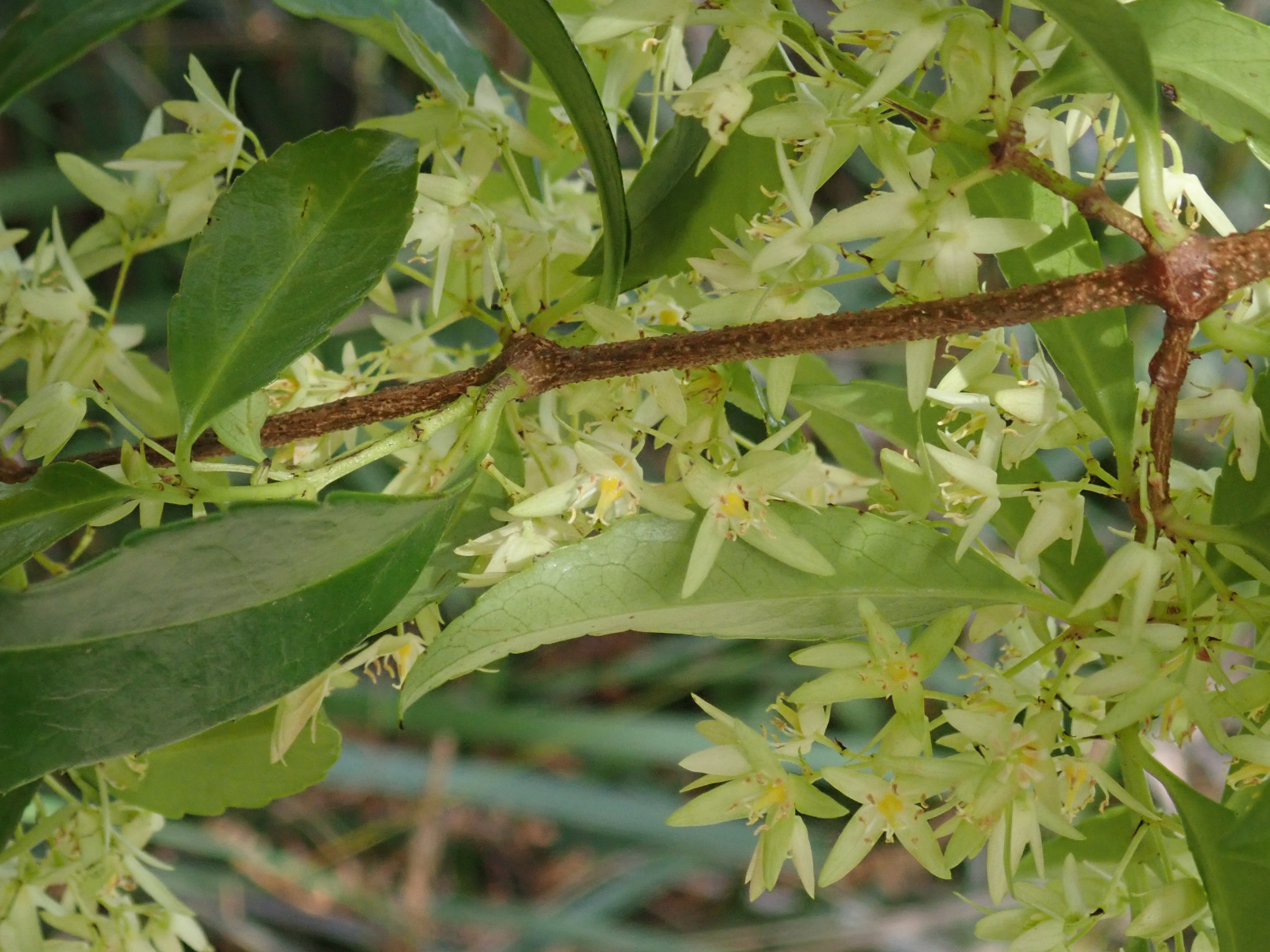
In Palm Beach, New South Wales

== Cultivation ==
In the garden, it used as a foliage plant in the shaded parts. As a twiner, it will require support to raise itself above ground level, although it can be trained to ramble. It is frost hardy, and no pests or diseases are known to affect it according to the Australian National Botanic Gardens.

A light fertilizer may be necessary in spring to maintain its glossy healthy foliage. If it becomes too vigorous, it will respond well to pruned. It can also be used as a basket plant. It is easily propagated from semi-hard cuttings.
