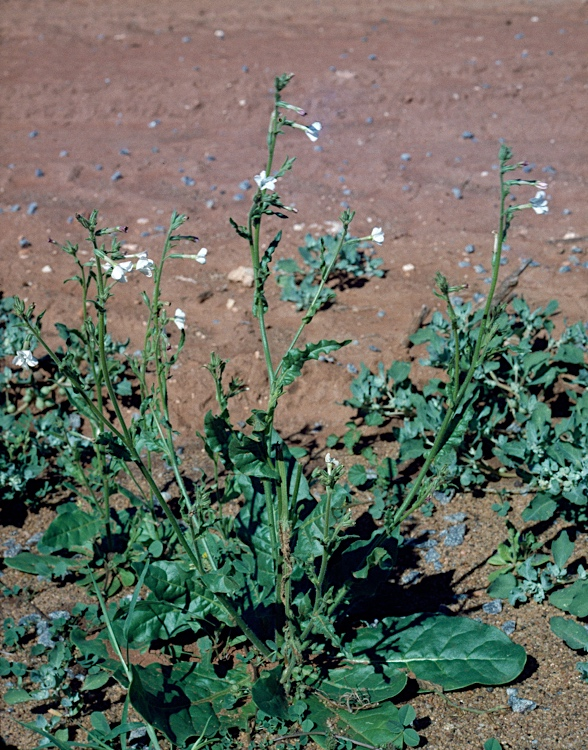

Scientific classification
- Kingdom: Plantae
- Clade: Tracheophytes
- Clade: Angiosperms
- Clade: Eudicots
- Clade: Asterids
- Order: Solanales
- Family: Solanaceae
- Genus: Nicotiana
- Species: N. occidentalis

Binomial name
- Nicotiana occidentalis H.-M.Wheeler

Subspecies
- N. occidentalis subsp. occidentalis N. occidentalis subsp. hesperis N. occidentalis subsp. obliqua

= Nicotiana occidentalis =

Species of plant

Nicotiana occidentalis, commonly known as native tobacco, is a short-lived herb endemic to Australia.

== Description ==
It grows as an annual or short-lived perennial herb, from ten to 120 centimetres high, with white or pink flowers. It is densely covered in sticky hairs.

== Taxonomy ==
It was first published in 1935 by Helen-Mar Wheeler, based on a specimen collected from Port Hedland in 1911.

Three subspecies are recognised. N. occidentalis subsp. obliqua is the only widespread subspecies; the other two, N. occidentalis subsp. occidentalis and N. occidentalis subsp. hesperis, are endemic to Western Australia.

== Distribution and habitat ==
It occurs throughout mid-latitude mainland Australia, but not in the tropical north, nor in the cooler, wetter, southwest and southeast corners. It thus occurs in every mainland state except Victoria. It grows in sand, clay and stony soils, on plains, along creeklines, and upon coastal limestone.
