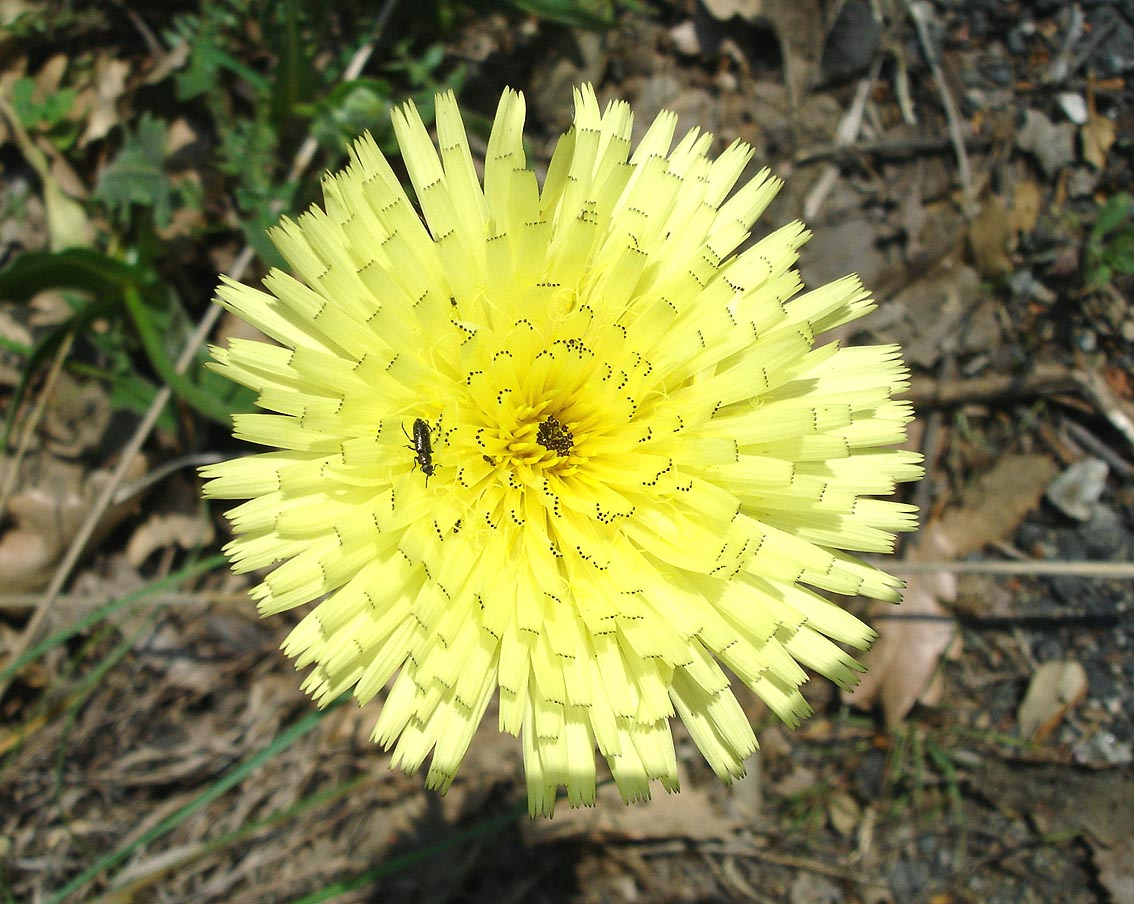
- Urospermum dalechampii

Scientific classification
- Kingdom: Plantae
- Clade: Tracheophytes
- Clade: Angiosperms
- Clade: Eudicots
- Clade: Asterids
- Order: Asterales
- Family: Asteraceae
- Subfamily: Cichorioideae
- Tribe: Cichorieae
- Subtribe: Hypochaeridinae
- Genus: Urospermum; Scop.

Type species
- Urospermum picroides (L.) F.W.Schmidt

Synonyms
- Daumailia Arènes; Tragopogonoides Vaill.; Arnopogon Willd.

= Urospermum =

Genus of flowering plants

Urospermum, or prickly goldenfleece, is a small genus of flowering plants in the dandelion tribe within the daisy family.

Species

- Urospermum dalechampii (L.) Scop. ex F.W.Schmidt - Mediterranean from Spain + Morocco to the Aegean; naturalized in Australia
- Urospermum picroides (L.) Scop. ex F.W.Schmidt - Mediterranean + southwestern Asia from Portugal + Canary Islands to Pakistan; naturalized in Australia, North America, South America
