= Galium leptogonium =

Rock bedstraw

Scientific classification
- Kingdom: Plantae
- Clade: Tracheophytes
- Clade: Angiosperms
- Clade: Eudicots
- Clade: Asterids
- Order: Gentianales
- Family: Rubiaceae
- Genus: Galium
- Species: G. leptogonium

Binomial name
- Galium leptogonium I.Thomps.

Species of plant

Galium leptogonium is a plant species in the family Rubiaceae. Common name is rock bedstraw. It is found only in Australia but widespread there, found in every state except Tasmania.

Galium leptogonium is very similar to G. migrans. Many herbarium specimens of G. leptogonium were formerly labeled as G. migrans. Galium leptogonium is an herb with thin, angled stems and lanceolate leaves in whorls of 4. Leaves and stems are usually covered with hairs but not always. Flowers are creamy white or very pale green. Fruiting capsules are roundish, dull and smooth.
