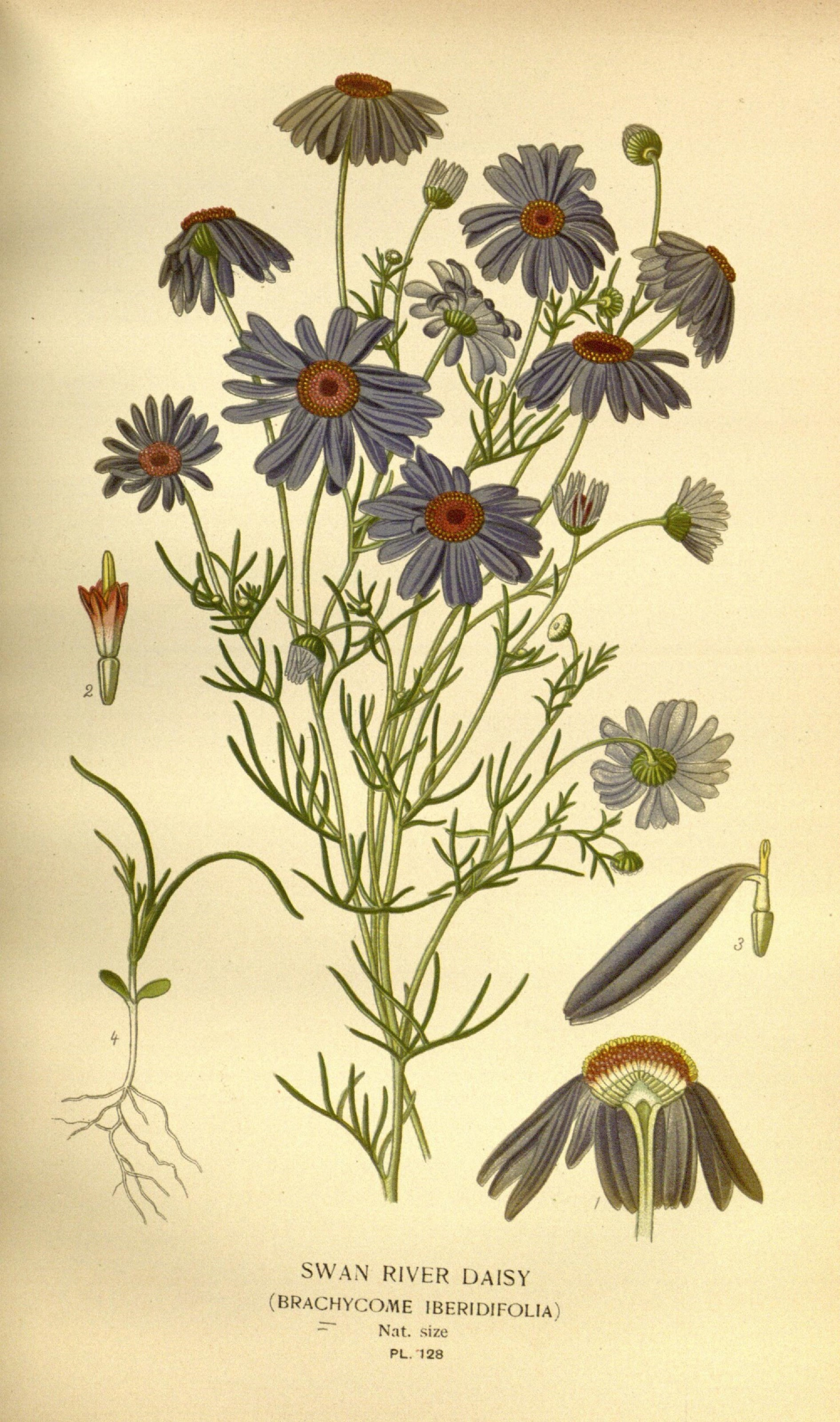

Scientific classification
- Kingdom: Plantae
- Clade: Tracheophytes
- Clade: Angiosperms
- Clade: Eudicots
- Clade: Asterids
- Order: Asterales
- Family: Asteraceae
- Genus: Brachyscome
- Species: B. iberidifolia

Binomial name
- Brachyscome iberidifolia Benth.

= Brachyscome iberidifolia =

Swan River daisy

Species of flowering plant

Brachyscome iberidifolia, commonly known as the Swan River daisy, is an annual herb native to Western Australia. Occupying a wide range, the species can form fields of plants. The Bellis daisy form and colours were familiar to Europeans when discovered, and they have since become a popular garden plant, as the species is hardy and adaptable, and poor or sandy soils do not prevent a showy display.

== Description ==
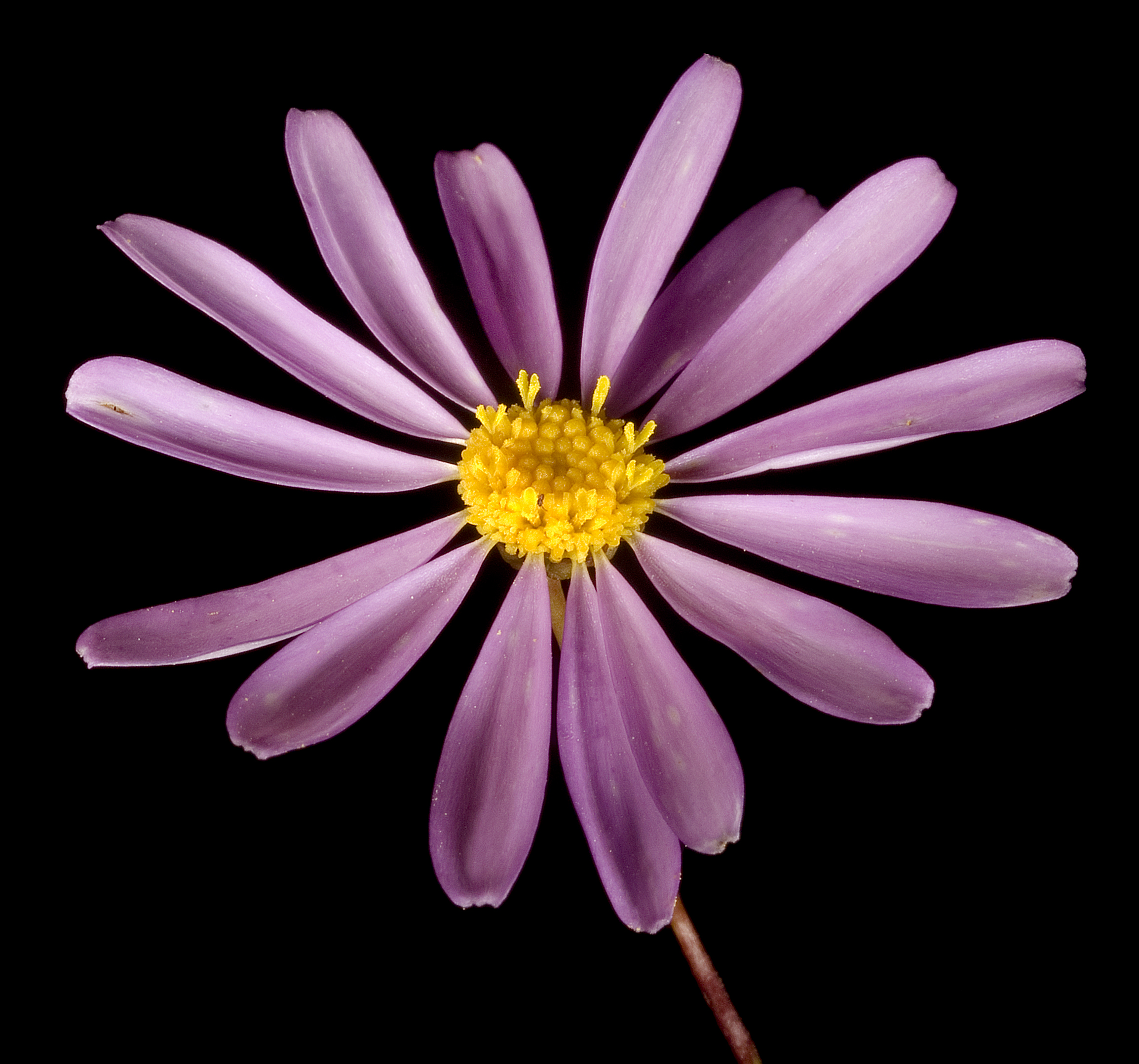
Close-up of flowers

The annual species is erect, many branched, forming fields of plants up to 400 millimetres (16 in) in height. The leaves of Brachyscome iberidifolia are fully divided, each having long and narrow segments from the midrib. The ray florets are varied in colour, white through pink and blue to violet. The typical daisy arrangement is seen in the flower head, which appear between August and May in endemic examples.

The plant still appears as 'Brachycome iberidifolia'; the generic name was reverted to include the 's' in the original publication.

It was first described as Brachycome iberidifolia by George Bentham in 1837.

== Distribution ==
The species is widespread, can be found on sands or clay, and is tolerant of salinity. It favours watercourses and depressions near granite, but is widespread on sandhills and other harsh coastal environments e.g. north to the Pilbara region, extending into Murchison, Gascoyne, Coolgardie regions, and recorded in the Gibson Desert. There are numerous records of it being found in the coastal regions of the west and south of Western Australia; it has also been found in the Abrolhos at East Wallabi Island.

It is often found amongst the mosaic of wildflowers which appear in the heaths, woodlands, and plains of Western Australia.

== Cultivation ==
Often cultivated and grown from seeds. Cultivars include 'Blue Star'.
