= Fish Point (Houtman Abrolhos) =

Peninsula on East Wallabi Island

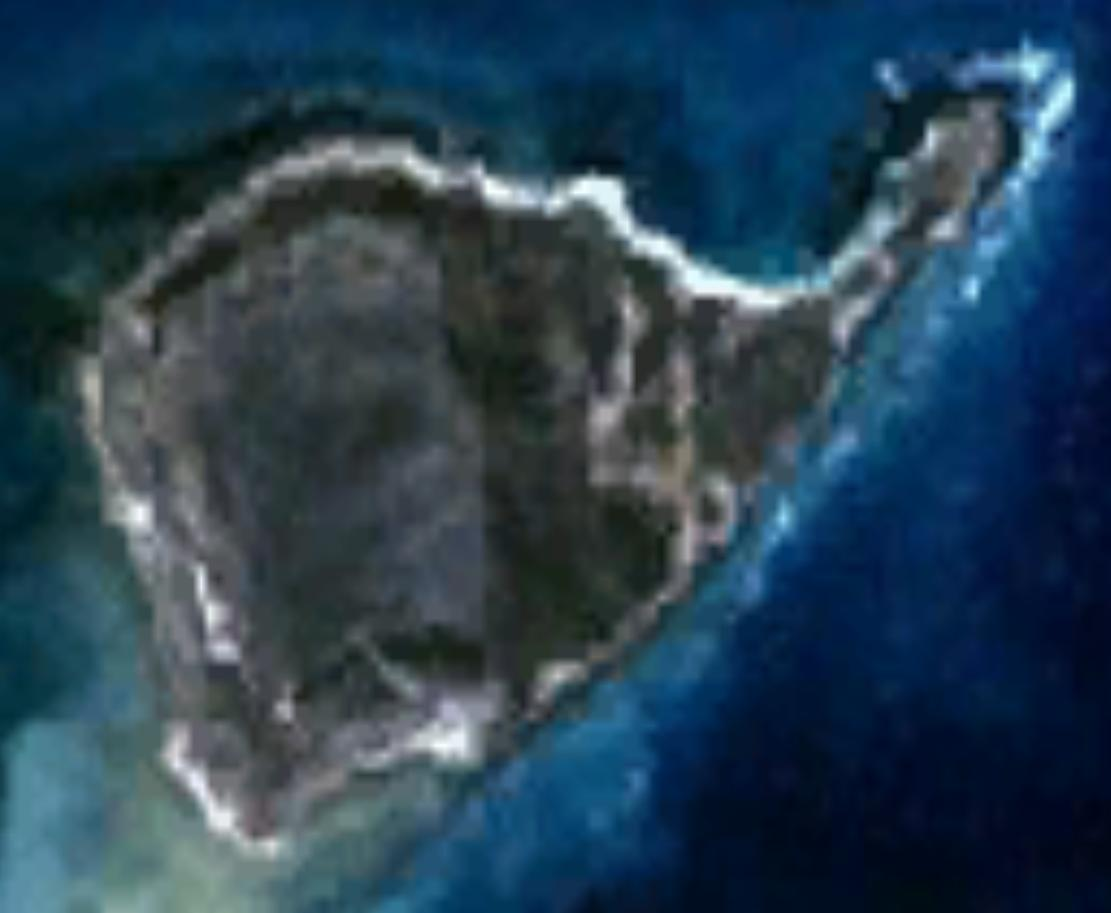

Fish Point is a point in the north-eastern corner of East Wallabi Island in the Houtman Abrolhos island chain off the coast of Western Australia. It is located at 28°25′40″S 113°44′34″E. It sits at the foot of Flag Hill, the highest peak on East Wallabi Island, and its western edge looks out onto Turtle Bay.

It was discovered in May 1840 by John Clements Wickham, Commander during the third voyage of HMS Beagle:

"Flag Hill... has a long finger-shaped point running out from its foot in a north-east direction, to which we gave the name of Fish Point, from the number of snappers we caught there. They were so voracious that they even allowed themselves to be taken with a small bit of paper for a bait."

It is now one of the most popular locations for tourists in the Wallabi Group. It is a popular dive site, with coral occurring within swimming distance of the shore.
