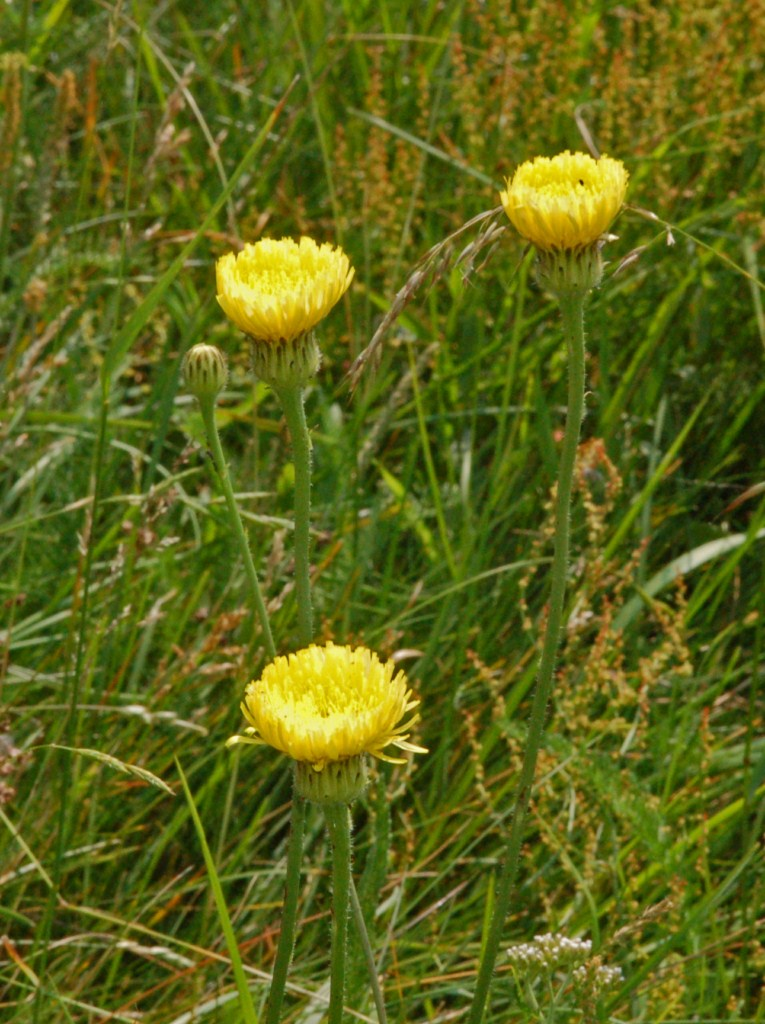

Scientific classification
- Kingdom: Plantae
- Clade: Tracheophytes
- Clade: Angiosperms
- Clade: Eudicots
- Clade: Asterids
- Order: Asterales
- Family: Asteraceae
- Genus: Urospermum
- Species: U. dalechampii

Binomial name
- Urospermum dalechampii (L.) Scop.

Synonyms
- Arnopogon dalechampii (L.) Scop.

= Urospermum dalechampii =

Species of flowering plant

Urospermum dalechampii, the smooth golden fleece or simply the golden-fleece, is a perennial herbaceous plant belonging to the genus Urospermum of the family Asteraceae.

== Description ==
Urospermum dalechampii reaches on average 25–40 centimetres (9.8–15.7 in) of height, with a minimum height of 10 centimetres (3.9 in) and a maximum height of 50 centimetres (20 in). This plant is quite hairy, with a single or branched stem. Basal leaves are usually arranged in a rosette of toothed leaves, while cauline leaves are just a few and smaller, more or less undivided and amplexicaul. The flowers are hermaphrodite. The flower heads are yellow sulfur, about five centimeter wide. Involucral bracts vary from seven to eight. Blooms are abundant throughout the Spring. The flowering period extends from March through August. The long, beaked fruit is an achene, and has a feathery, slightly reddish pappus.

== Gallery ==
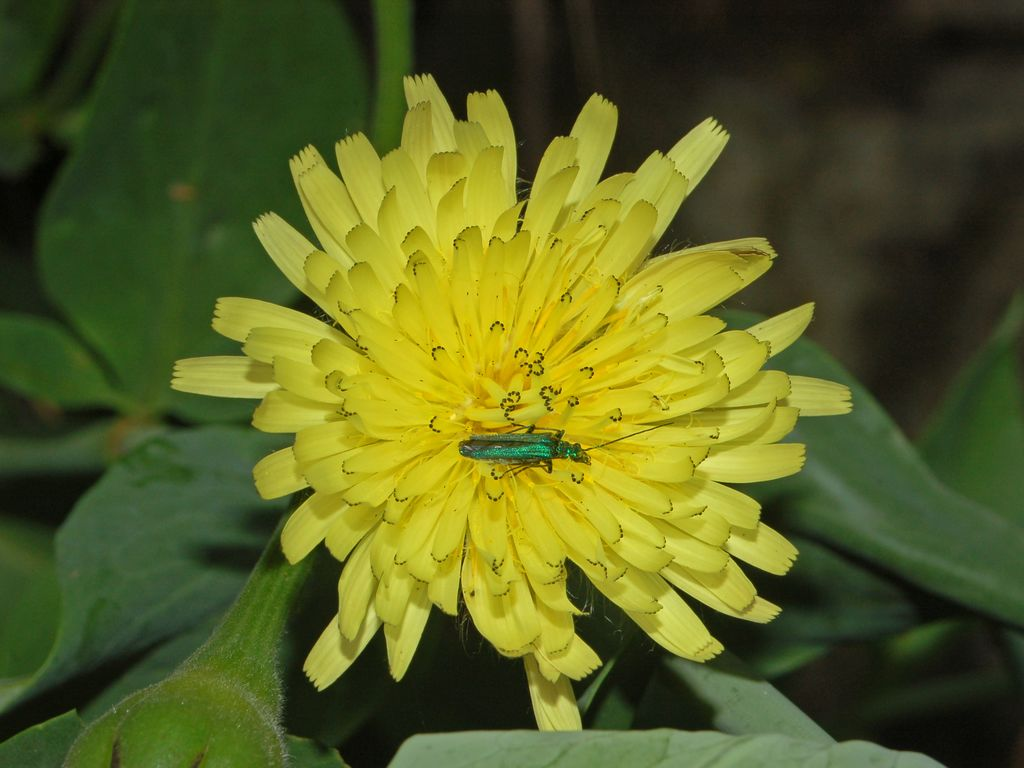
Flower of Urospermum dalechampii

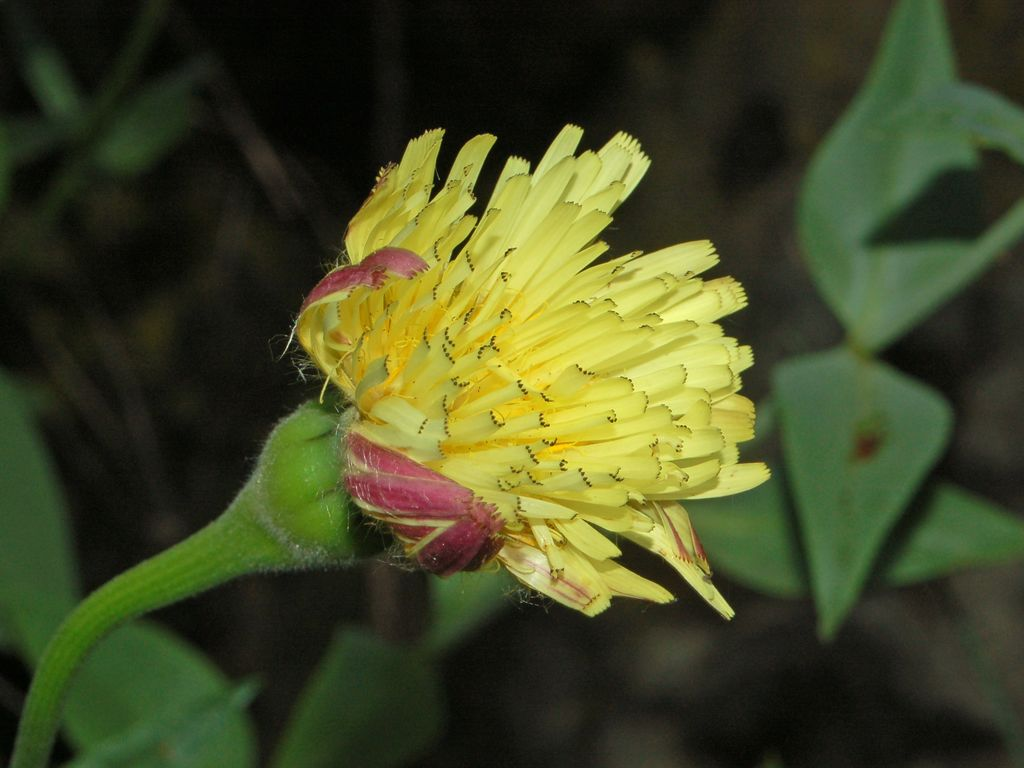
Flower of Urospermum dalechampii

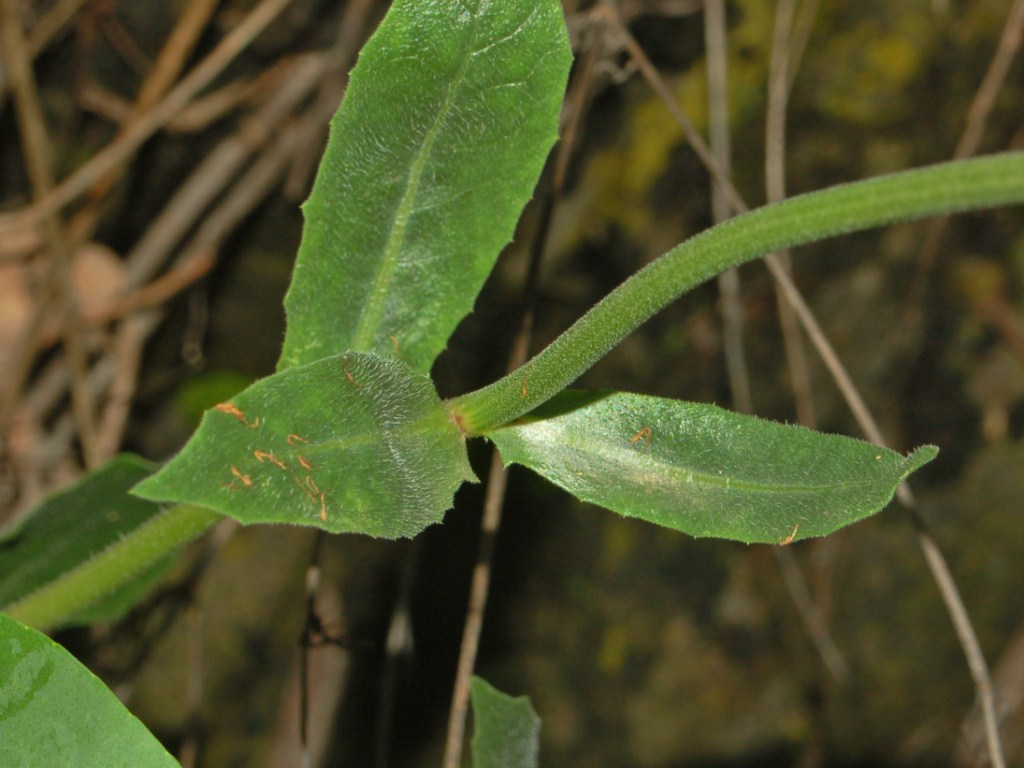
Leaves of Urospermum dalechampii

== Distribution ==
This plant occurs in Western and Central Mediterranean from Spain to Dalmatia and North Africa.

== Habitat ==
These plants can be found on roadsides, dry grasslands or wastelands at 0–1,200 metres (0–3,937 ft) above sea level. They are commonly grown in drained soil and sunny places throughout the year.
