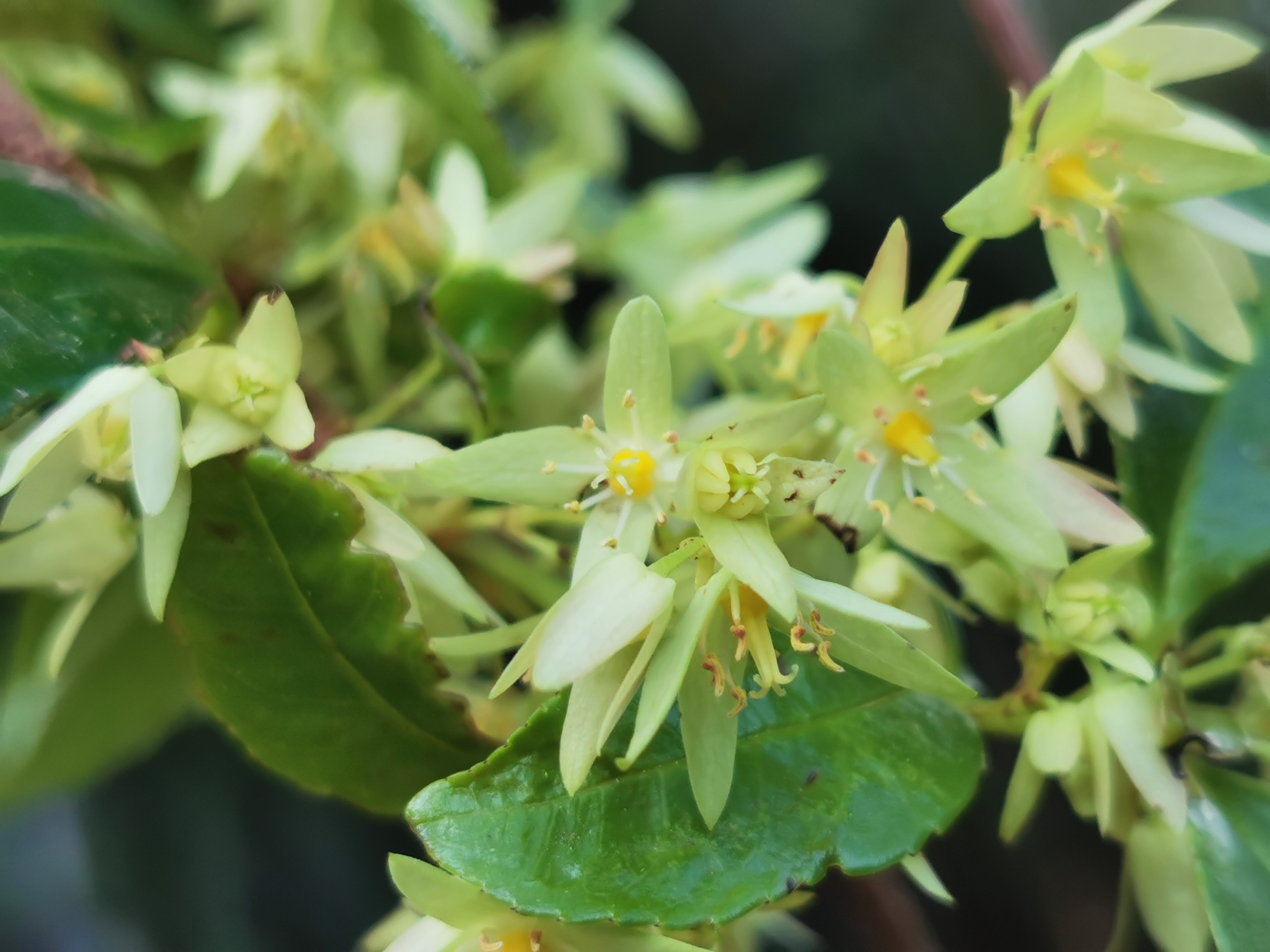
- Aphanopetalum resinosum

Scientific classification
- Kingdom: Plantae
- Clade: Tracheophytes
- Clade: Angiosperms
- Clade: Eudicots
- Order: Saxifragales
- Family: Aphanopetalaceae; Doweld
- Genus: Aphanopetalum; Endl.

Type species
- Aphanopetalum resinosum Endl.

Species
- See text

= Aphanopetalum =

Genus of flowering plants

Aphanopetalum is a genus of twining shrubs or vines in the family Aphanopetalaceae which is endemic to Australia.

The genus is placed alone in family Aphanopetalaceae, now placed in the order Saxifragales. Until recently this family was placed in Oxalidales, and before that the genus was included in family Cunoniaceae, also within Oxalidales. The type species is Aphanopetalum resinosum. There are two species:

- Aphanopetalum clematideum (Harv.) Domin, endemic to limestone cliffs of south western Australia
- Aphanopetalum resinosum Endl. - gum vine, from northeastern Victoria, through New South Wales to northern Queensland

The Aphanopetalaceae are scrambling shrubs with lenticellate stems, having opposite and serrate leaves with minute "stipules". The flowers and inflorescences are axillary. The flowers are essentially without petals, and have four large, white sepals that enlarge when in fruit (which is single-seeded).
