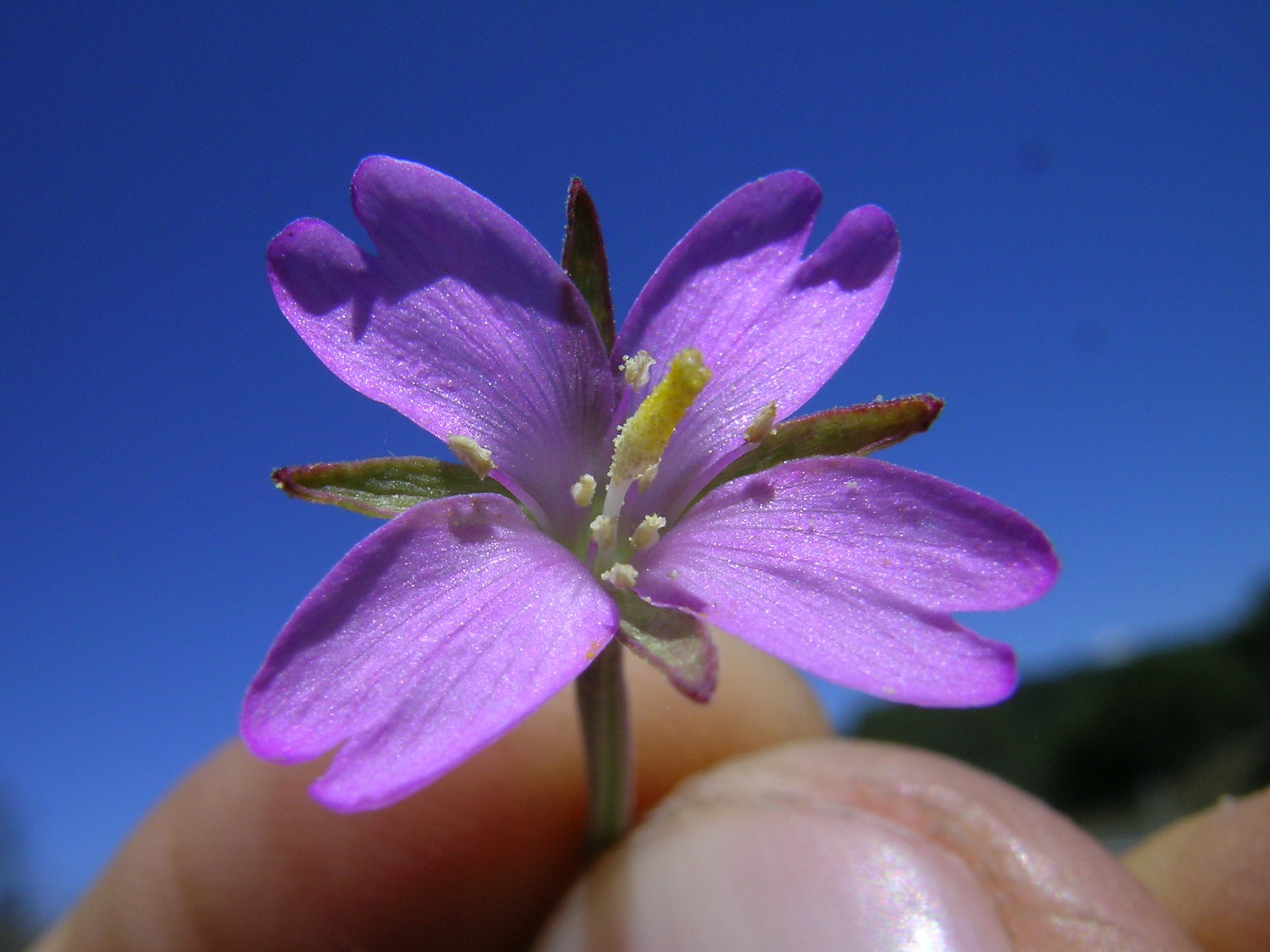

Scientific classification
- Kingdom: Plantae
- Clade: Tracheophytes
- Clade: Angiosperms
- Clade: Eudicots
- Clade: Rosids
- Order: Myrtales
- Family: Onagraceae
- Genus: Epilobium
- Species: E. billardierianum

Binomial name
- Epilobium billardierianum Ser.

= Epilobium billardierianum =

Species of flowering plant

Epilobium billardierianum, commonly known as the glabrous willow herb or smooth willow herb, is a species in the family Onagraceae that is native to Australia and New Zealand.

In Western Australia, the species is found in the South West, Great Southern and Goldfields-Esperance regions.
