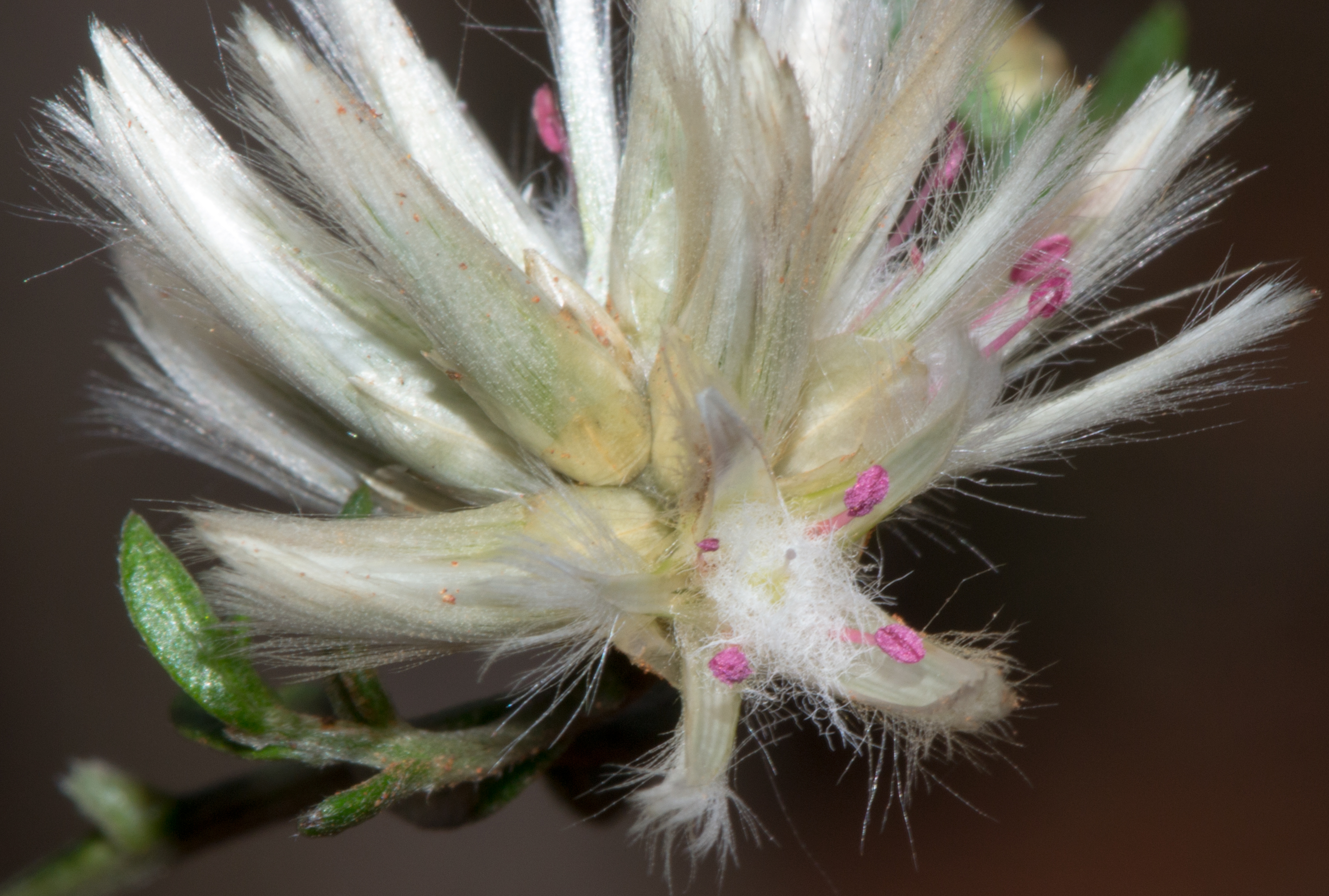

Scientific classification
- Kingdom: Plantae
- Clade: Tracheophytes
- Clade: Angiosperms
- Clade: Eudicots
- Order: Caryophyllales
- Family: Amaranthaceae
- Genus: Ptilotus
- Species: P. divaricatus

Binomial name
- Ptilotus divaricatus (Gaudich.) F.Muell.

Synonyms
- Ptilotus divaricatus (Gaudich.) F.Muell. var. divaricatus; Ptilotus divaricatus var. rubescens Benl; Ptilotus striatus (Moq. ex Benth.) F.Muell.; Trichinium divaricatum Gaudich.; Trichinium striatum Moq. ex Benth.

= Ptilotus divaricatus =

Species of grass-like plant

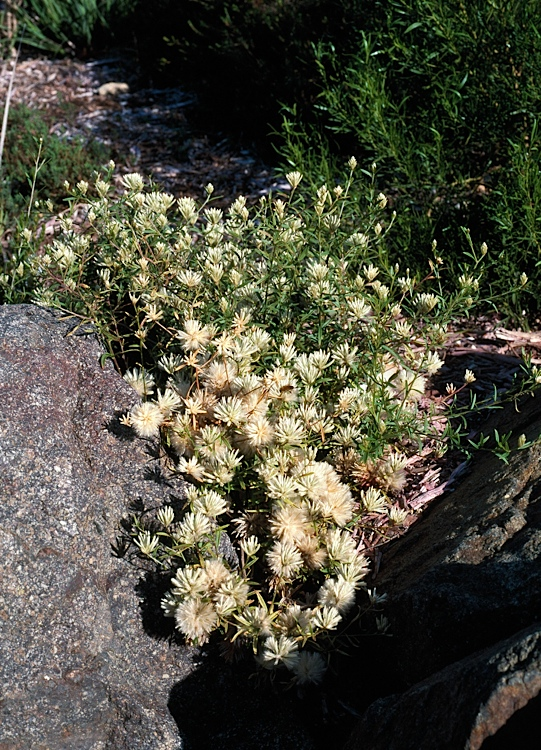
Habit in the Australian National Botanic Gardens

Ptilotus divaricatus, commonly known as climbing mulla mulla is a species of flowering plant in the family Amaranthaceae and is endemic Western Australia. It is a prostrate to scrambling shrub with linear stem leaves and oval, hemispherical or spherical clusters of white or pinkish-purple flowers.

== Description ==
Ptilotus divaricatus is a prostrate to spreading shrub that typically grows to a height of 0.3–1.5 m (1 ft 0 in – 4 ft 11 in). Its stem leaves are linear, 5–45 mm (0.20–1.77 in) long and 1–5 mm (0.039–0.197 in) wide. There are no leaves at the base of the plant. The flowers are borne in oval, hemispherical or spherical clusters of densely arranged white or pinkish-purple flowers with colourless bracts 4.0–4.5 mm (0.16–0.18 in) long and bracteoles 5.5–6.5 mm (0.22–0.26 in) long at the base. The outer tepals are 9.5–15 mm (0.37–0.59 in) long and the inner tepals slightly shorter with a tuft of hairs on the inner surface. The style is 4.0–4.6 mm (0.16–0.18 in) long. Flowering occurs from September to December and the seeds are dull orange or pale brown.

== Taxonomy ==
This species was first described in 1829 by Charles Gaudichaud-Beaupré who gave it the name Trichinium divaricatum in his Voyage Autour du Monde ... sur les Corvettes de S.M. l'Uranie et la Physicienne. Botanique. In 1868 by Ferdinand von Mueller transferred the species to Ptilotus as P. divaricatus in his Fragmenta Phytographiae Australiae.

== Distribution and habitat ==
Ptilotus divaricatus grows in sandy soils and laterite and is widely distributed in the Avon Wheatbelt, Carnarvon, Coolgardie, Gascoyne, Geraldton Sandplains, Murchison, Pilbara, Swan Coastal Plain and Yalgoo bioregions of Western Australia.

== Conservation status ==
Ptilotus divaricatus is listed as "not threatened" by the Government of Western Australia Department of Biodiversity, Conservation and Attractions.
