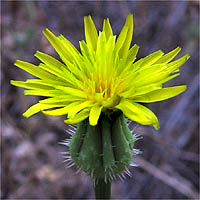

Scientific classification
- Kingdom: Plantae
- Clade: Tracheophytes
- Clade: Angiosperms
- Clade: Eudicots
- Clade: Asterids
- Order: Asterales
- Family: Asteraceae
- Genus: Urospermum
- Species: U. picroides

Binomial name
- Urospermum picroides (L.) Scop. ex F.W.Schmidt

Synonyms
- Tragopogon picroides

= Urospermum picroides =

Species of flowering plant

Urospermum picroides is a species of flowering plant in the family Asteraceae known by various common names including prickly goldenfleece, scaly hawkbit, false hawkbit, and prickly cupped goat's beard. It is native to Eurasia and it is known as an introduced species in many other regions, including North and South America, Australia, and southern Africa. It grows as a common weed in disturbed habitat. In Crete and Turkey where it grows natively, it is used as a wild edible plant.

This annual herb grows up to 30 to 50 centimeters tall. It is coated in long hairs and bristles. The bristly leaves are variously shaped, often divided into many sharp-toothed lobes. The inflorescence bears flower heads on thick peduncles. The head is 1 to 2 centimeters long or more and filled with yellow ray florets. It is enveloped in several pointed phyllaries which are covered in bristly hairs. The fruit is an achene well over a centimeter in length which is tipped with a pappus of bristles.

== Uses ==
Urospermum picroides is commonly consumed by local communities of the Mediterranean basin in raw, boiled, or cooked form. The plant's ability to tolerate salinity shows potential for domestication and integration in cropping systems where the cultivation of conventional crops is compromised due to low quality irrigation water.

Urospermum picroides has anti-inflammatory and anti-oxident qualities and recent research has shown that the flowering parts may be a potential source for anticancer agents.
