= Galium migrans =

Scientific classification
- Kingdom: Plantae
- Clade: Tracheophytes
- Clade: Angiosperms
- Clade: Eudicots
- Clade: Asterids
- Order: Gentianales
- Family: Rubiaceae
- Genus: Galium
- Species: G. migrans

Binomial name
- Galium migrans Ehrend. & McGill.

Species of plant

Galium migrans is a species of flowering plant in the family Rubiaceae. Following a revision of the genus Galium, the distribution of Gallium migrans is now believed to be restricted to South Australia. Plants in New South Wales that were formerly identified as this species are currently identified as Galium leptogonium.

== Subspecies ==
Three subspecies are recognized as of May 2014:

- Galium migrans subsp. inversum I.Thomps.
- Galium migrans subsp. migrans
- Galium migrans subsp. trichogynum I.Thomps.
