= Dodonaea aptera =

Scientific classification
- Kingdom: Plantae
- Clade: Tracheophytes
- Clade: Angiosperms
- Clade: Eudicots
- Clade: Rosids
- Order: Sapindales
- Family: Sapindaceae
- Genus: Dodonaea
- Species: D. aptera

Binomial name
- Dodonaea aptera Miq.

Synonyms
- Dodonaea sororia Miq.

Species of flowering plant

Dodonaea aptera, commonly known as coast hop-bush, is a species of plant in the family Sapindaceae and is endemic to coastal areas of the south-west of Western Australia. It is an erect to spreading shrub with simple, usually elliptic leaves, flowers arranged in cymes or panicles and more or less spherical capsules with four lobe-like wings.

== Description ==
Dodonaea aptera is a dioecious, erect or spreading shrub that typically grows to a height of up to 3.5 m (11 ft). Its leaves are simple, usually elliptic, 22–60 mm (0.87–2.36 in) long and 10–32 mm (0.39–1.26 in) wide on a petiole 4–10.5 mm (0.16–0.41 in) long. The flowers are borne on the ends of branches in cymes or panicles, each flower on a pedicel 3–7 mm (0.12–0.28 in) long, with four lance-shaped sepals 2.5–3 mm (0.098–0.118 in) long, but that fall off as the flowers open. There are eight stamens and a glabrous ovary. Flowering mainly occurs from April to July, and the fruit is a more or less spherical, egg-shaped or broadly oblong capsule, 5–6 mm (0.20–0.24 in) long and 6–7 mm (0.24–0.28 in) wide, with lobe-like wings 0.5–1 mm (0.020–0.039 in) wide.

== Taxonomy ==
Dodonaea aptera was first formally described in 1845 by Friedrich Anton Wilhelm Miquel in Lehmann's Plantae Preissianae, based on specimens collected in 1839 at Garden Island, Rottnest Island, and Arthurs Head in Fremantle. The specific epithet (aptera) means 'without a wing'.

== Distribution and habitat ==
This species of Dodonaea grows in coastal areas of the south-west of Western Australia on limestone cliffs or shallow sand over limestone between Shark Bay and Cape Freycinet.

== Conservation status ==
Dodonaea aptera is listed as "not threatened" by the Government of Western Australia Department of Biodiversity, Conservation and Attractions.
