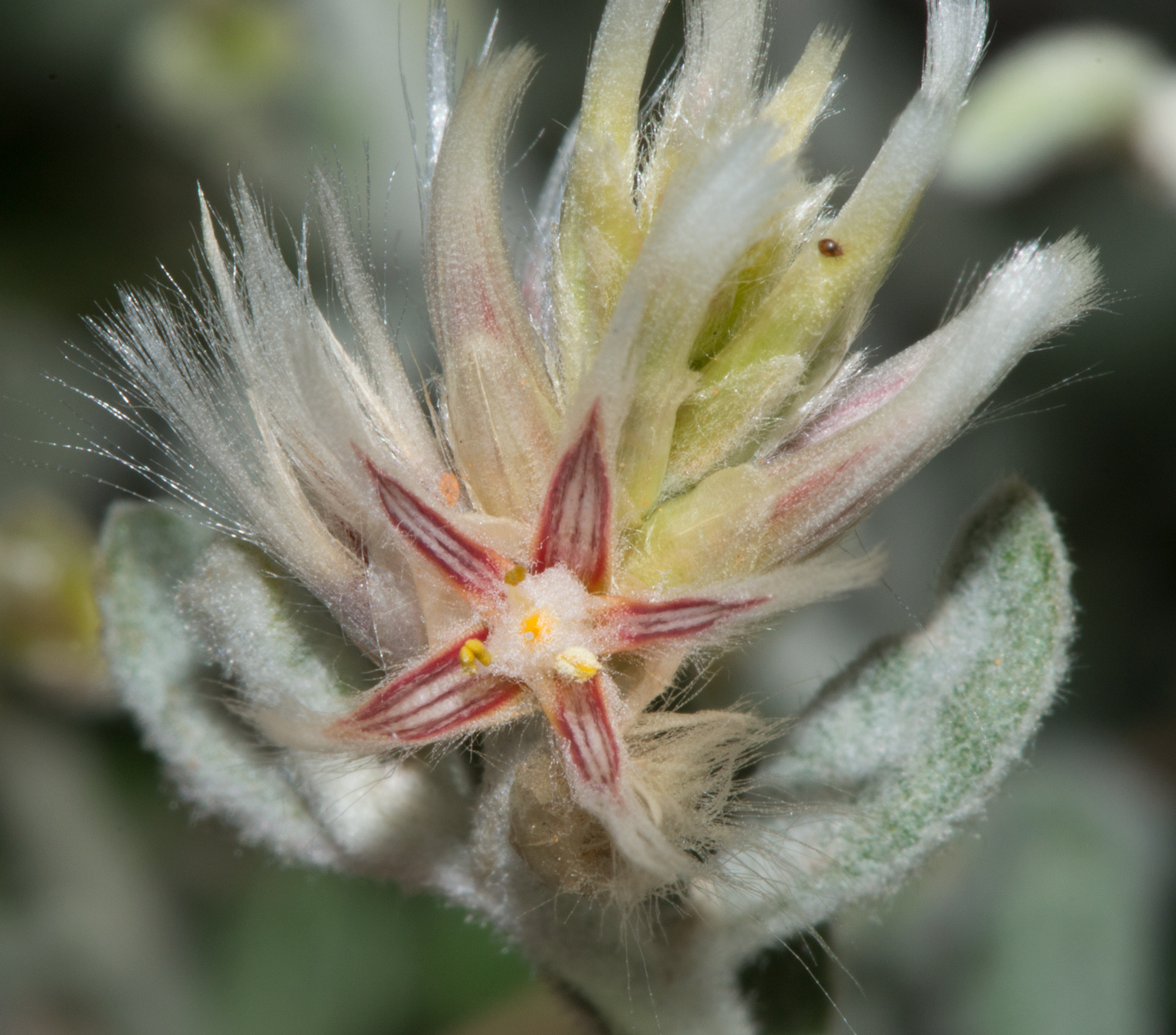
- About 40 km (25 mi) north-east of Wubin

Scientific classification
- Kingdom: Plantae
- Clade: Tracheophytes
- Clade: Angiosperms
- Clade: Eudicots
- Order: Caryophyllales
- Family: Amaranthaceae
- Genus: Ptilotus
- Species: P. eriotrichus

Binomial name
- Ptilotus eriotrichus (W.Fitzg. ex Ewart & Jean White) P.S.Short

Synonyms
- Ptilotus eriostrichus W.Fitzg. orth. var.; Ptilotus eriotrichus W.Fitzg. nom. illeg.; Ptilotus eriotrichus Benl nom. inval., nom. nud.; Ptilotus eriotrichus J.W.Green nom. inval., nom. nud.; Ptilotus eriotrichus J.W.Green nom. inval., nom. nud.; Ptilotus eriotrichus J.W.Green nom. inval., nom. nud.; Trichinium eriotrichum W.Fitzg. ex Ewart & Jean White

= Ptilotus eriotrichus =

Species of grass-like plant

Ptilotus eriotrichus is a species of flowering plant in the family Amaranthaceae and is endemic to the south-west of Western Australia. It is a prostrate to erect or scrambling shrub with wiry stems, egg-shaped to lance-shaped stem leaves that are densely hairy on the lower surface, and white, oval, hemispherical or cylindrical spikes of flowers.

== Description ==
Ptilotus eriotrichus is a prostrate to erect or scrambling shrub that typically grows to a height of 20–90 cm (7.9–35.4 in) and has wiry stems. The stem leaves are egg-shaped to lance-shaped, 7–35 mm (0.28–1.38 in) long and 2–12 mm (0.079–0.472 in) wide and densely hairy on the lower surface. The flowers are borne in white, oval, hemispherical or spherical heads with densely arranged flowers. There are glabrous, colourless bracts 3.2–4.3 mm (0.13–0.17 in) long and bracteoles 3.8–5 mm (0.15–0.20 in) long. The outer tepals are 6.2–8 mm (0.24–0.31 in) long and the inner tepals 5.5–7.2 mm (0.22–0.28 in) with a tuft of hairs on the inner surface. The style is 0.9–1.1 mm (0.035–0.043 in) long and fixed to the side of the ovary. Flowering occurs from September to December, and the seed is orange, brown or pale brown.

== Taxonomy ==
This species was first formally described in 1910 by Alfred James Ewart and Jean White-Haney who gave it the name Trichinium eriotrichus in Proceedings of the Royal Society of Victoria from an unpublished description by William Vincent Fitzgerald. In 1991, Philip Sydney Short transferred the species to Ptilotus as P. eriotrichus in the journal Muelleria. The specific epithet (eriotrichus) means 'woolly hair'.

== Distribution and habitat ==
This species of Ptilotus grows in red sand or clay is found in the Avon Wheatbelt and Geraldton Sandplains bioregions of south-western Western Australia.

== Conservation status ==
Ptilotus eriotrichus is listed as "not threatened" by the Government of Western Australia Department of Biodiversity, Conservation and Attractions.

== See also ==
- List of Ptilotus species
