= Crassula colorata =

Dense stonecrop

Scientific classification
- Kingdom: Plantae
- Clade: Tracheophytes
- Clade: Angiosperms
- Clade: Eudicots
- Order: Saxifragales
- Family: Crassulaceae
- Genus: Crassula
- Species: C. colorata

Binomial name
- Crassula colorata (Nees) Ostenf.

Synonyms
- Tillaea colorata Nees

Species of plant

Crassula colorata, the dense pigmyweed or dense stonecrop, is an annual plant in the family Crassulaceae. The species is endemic to Australia, occurring in Western Australia, South Australia, New South Wales and Victoria.

The succulent annual herb typically grows to a height of 1.5 to 15 centimetres (0.6 to 5.9 in). It produces green-red-yellow flowers between August and October.

It is found amongst rocky outcrops, along road-sides and on low-lying areas where it grows in sandy-loamy soils over ironstone or granite.

There are three known varieties of the species;

- Crassula colorata var. acuminata (Reader) Toelken
- Crassula colorata var. (Nees) Ostenf. var. colorata
- Crassula colorata var. miriamiae (Ostenf.) Toelken
