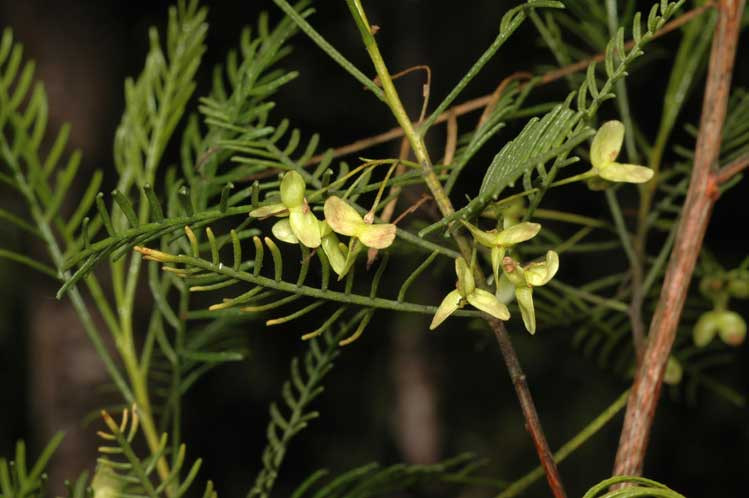
- In the ANBG

Scientific classification
- Kingdom: Plantae
- Clade: Tracheophytes
- Clade: Angiosperms
- Clade: Eudicots
- Clade: Rosids
- Order: Sapindales
- Family: Sapindaceae
- Genus: Dodonaea
- Species: D. inaequifolia

Binomial name
- Dodonaea inaequifolia Turcz.

Synonyms
- Dodonaea leptozyga F.Muell.; Dodonaea concinna auct. non Benth:Mueller 1875

= Dodonaea inaequifolia =

Species of shrub

Dodonaea inaequifolia is a species of plant in the family Sapindaceae and is endemic to the south-west of Western Australia. It is an erect, dioecious shrub with imparipinnate leaves with 17 to 23 linear, channelled leaflets, flowers arranged in cymes of up to six flowers with usually six stamens, and three-winged capsules.

== Description ==
Dodonaea inaequifolia is an erect, dioecious, spreading shrub that typically grows to a height of up to 5 m (16 ft). Its leaves are imparipinnate, 15–52 mm (0.59–2.05 in) long with 17 to 23 linear leaflets, 2–13 mm (0.079–0.512 in) long, 0.5–1.5 mm (0.020–0.059 in) wide and channelled on the upper surface, on a petiole 7–17.5 mm (0.28–0.69 in) long. The flowers are borne in cymes in leaf axils with two to six flowers, each flower on a pedicel 3–8.5 mm (0.12–0.33 in) long. The three or four sepals are egg-shaped, 1.5–3.5 mm (0.059–0.138 in) long fall off as the flowers mature, and there are usually six stamens. The ovary is glabrous or with a few soft hairs near the tip. The fruit is an oval, three- or rarely four-winged capsule, 4.5–7.5 mm (0.18–0.30 in) long and 9–16 mm (0.35–0.63 in) wide, the wings 2–5 mm (0.079–0.197 in) wide and membranous.

== Taxonomy and naming ==
Dodonaea inaequifolia was first formally described in 1858 by Nikolai Turczaninow in the Bulletin de la Société impériale des naturalistes de Moscou from specimens collected by James Drummond. The specific epithet (inaequifolia) means 'uneven leaved'.

== Distribution and habitat ==
This species of Dodonaea grows in semi-arid mallee-heath, mallee scrub or open woodland between Dirk Hartog Island and Southern Cross in the Avon Wheatbelt, Carnarvon, Coolgardie, Geraldton Sandplains, Jarrah Forest, Mallee, Murchison and Yalgoo bioregions of south-western Western Australia.

== Conservation status ==
Dodonaea inaequifolia is listed as "not threatened" by the Government of Western Australia Department of Biodiversity, Conservation and Attractions.
