= Nicotiana occidentalis subsp. hesperis =

Scientific classification
- Kingdom: Plantae
- Clade: Embryophytes
- Clade: Tracheophytes
- Clade: Spermatophytes
- Clade: Angiosperms
- Clade: Eudicots
- Clade: Asterids
- Order: Solanales
- Family: Solanaceae
- Genus: Nicotiana
- Species: N. occidentalis
- Subspecies: N. o. subsp. hesperis

Trinomial name
- Nicotiana occidentalis subsp. hesperis (N.T.Burb.) P.Horton

Subspecies of flowering plant

Nicotiana occidentalis subsp. hesperis is a short-lived herb native to Australia.

== Description ==
It grows as an erect annual or short-lived perennial herb, from ten to 50 centimetres high, with white flowers.

== Taxonomy ==
It was first published in 1960 by Nancy Tyson Burbidge, who give it species rank as Nicotiana hesperis. In 1981, Philippa Horton demoted it to a subspecies of Nicotiana occidentalis.

== Distribution and habitat ==
It is endemic to Western Australia, being fairly widespread through mid-latitude parts. It is most common along the coast, but is also found well inland, such as north of Kalgoorlie.
