= Senecio glossanthus =

Scientific classification
- Kingdom: Plantae
- Clade: Tracheophytes
- Clade: Angiosperms
- Clade: Eudicots
- Clade: Asterids
- Order: Asterales
- Family: Asteraceae
- Genus: Senecio
- Species: S. glossanthus

Binomial name
- Senecio glossanthus (Sond.) Belcher

Species of herb

Senecio glossanthus is an annual herb native to Australia. In Western Australia it is commonly known as slender groundsel.

== Description ==
It grows as an erect annual herb, reaching up to 70 centimetres (28 in) in height, though normally not more than 30 centimetres (12 in) high. It is sparsely hairy, with few branches except for the branched inflorescence. The flowers are yellow.

== Taxonomy ==
It was first published as Erechtites glossantha by Otto Wilhelm Sonder in 1853. In 1867, George Bentham transferred it into Senecio as S. brachyglossus, but this was later considered an illegitimate name because it unnecessarily replaced Sonder's specific epithet. In 1956, Robert Orange Belcher effected a legitimate transfer by publishing the name Senecio glossanthus.

== Distribution and habitat ==
It is widespread in temperate parts of the Australian mainland, occurring in every mainland state.
