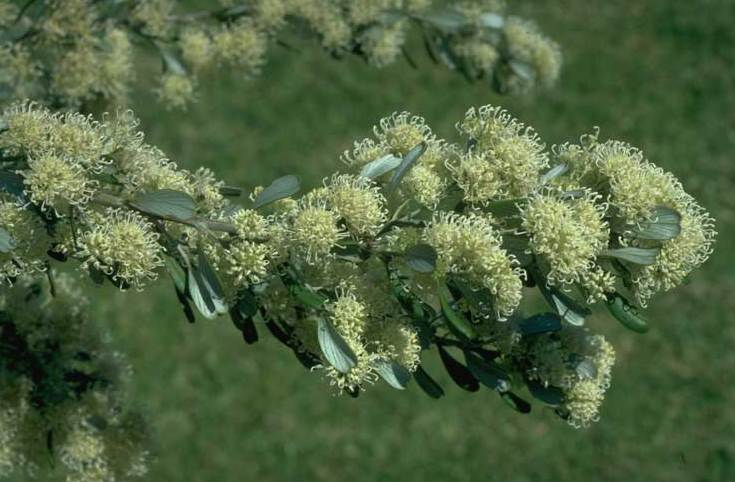
- Grevillea argyrophylla in Kings Park

Conservation status
- Least Concern (IUCN 3.1)

Scientific classification
- Kingdom: Plantae
- Clade: Embryophytes
- Clade: Tracheophytes
- Clade: Spermatophytes
- Clade: Angiosperms
- Clade: Eudicots
- Order: Proteales
- Family: Proteaceae
- Genus: Grevillea
- Species: G. argyrophylla

Binomial name
- Grevillea argyrophylla Meisn.

= Grevillea argyrophylla =

Species of shrub endemic to Western Australia

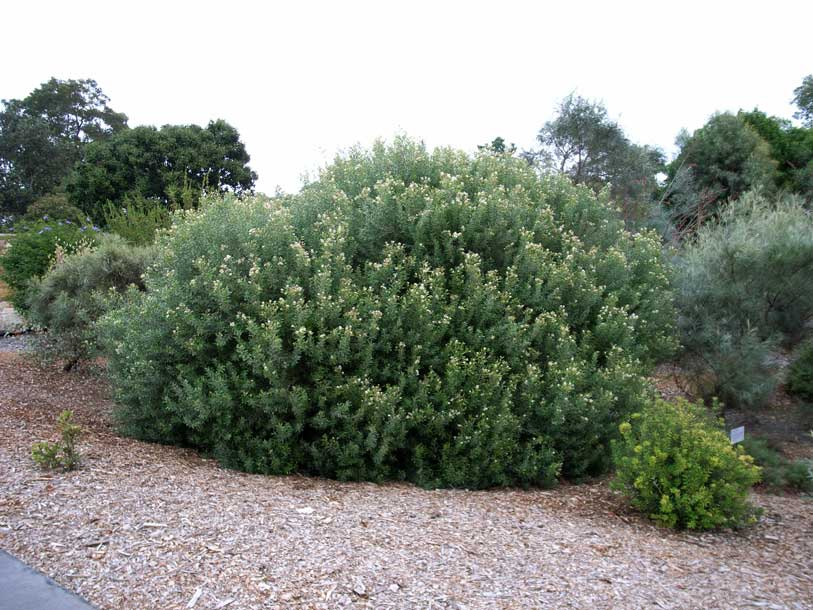
Habit in Mount Annan Botanic Garden

Grevillea argyrophylla, the silvery-leaved grevillea, is a species of flowering plant in the family Proteaceae and is endemic to the south-west of Western Australia. It is an erect, sometimes low-lying shrub with egg-shaped leaves with the narrower end towards the base, and white flowers, sometimes tinged with pink.

== Description ==
Grevillea argyrophylla is an erect, sometimes low-lying shrub that typically grows to a height of 0.6–2 m (2 ft 0 in – 6 ft 7 in) with softly-hairy branchlets. Its leaves are erect, egg-shaped with the narrower end towards the base, 15–60 mm (0.59–2.36 in) long and 2.5–8 mm (0.098–0.315 in) wide, often with a notch in the tip. The flowers are arranged in groups on a woolly-hairy rachis 1–4 mm (0.039–0.157 in) long, and are white, sometimes with a pink tinge. The pistil is 4–7 mm (0.16–0.28 in) long and glabrous. Flowering mainly occurs from July to October and the fruit is an oval follicle 6–10 mm (0.24–0.39 in) long.

== Taxonomy ==
Grevillea argyrophylla was first formally described in 1855 by Carl Meissner in Hooker's Journal of Botany and Kew Garden Miscellany, from material collected by James Drummond. The specific epithet (argyrophylla) means "silvery-leaved".

== Distribution and habitat ==
Silvery-leaved grevillea grows in heath and shrubland over limestone or sandstone in near-coastal areas from the Murchison River to Dandaragan and Jurien Bay in the Avon Wheatbelt, Geraldton Sandplains and Yalgoo biogeographic regions of south-western Western Australia.

== Conservation status ==
This grevillea is listed as not threatened by the Government of Western Australia's Department of Biodiversity, Conservation and Attractions and as least concern on the IUCN Red List of Threatened Species. Despite its relatively small range, it is common and its population is stable. There are no known substantial threats to the species, either currently or in the immediate future.
