= Bossiaea spinescens =

Scientific classification
- Kingdom: Plantae
- Clade: Tracheophytes
- Clade: Angiosperms
- Clade: Eudicots
- Clade: Rosids
- Order: Fabales
- Family: Fabaceae
- Subfamily: Faboideae
- Genus: Bossiaea
- Species: B. spinescens

Binomial name
- Bossiaea spinescens Meisn.

Species of legume

Bossiaea spinescens is a species of flowering plant in the family Fabaceae and is endemic to the south-west of Western Australia. It is a slender, spreading or compact, spiny shrub with oblong to oval leaves and yellow and reddish-brown, pea-like flowers.

== Description ==
Bossiaea spinescens is a slender, spreading or compact, spiny shrub that typically grows up to 2 m (6 ft 7 in) high and 1.5 m (4 ft 11 in) wide with ridged branchlets and short side-shoots ending in a spiny point. The leaves are oblong to oval, 2–10 mm (0.079–0.394 in) long and 1.0–4.2 mm (0.039–0.165 in) wide on a petiole 0.6–1.5 mm (0.024–0.059 in) long with stipules 0.5–1.7 mm (0.020–0.067 in) long at the base. The flowers are arranged singly or in small groups, each flower on a hairy pedicel 2.5–12 mm (0.098–0.472 in) long, with oblong to egg-shaped bracts 0.5–0.9 mm (0.020–0.035 in) long at the base, but that usually fall off as the flower opens. There are hairy bracteoles 1.0–1.5 mm (0.039–0.059 in) long at the base of the sepals. The five sepals are glabrous and joined at the base, forming a tube 2.0–3.5 mm (0.079–0.138 in) long, the two upper lobes 0.8–1.4 mm (0.031–0.055 in) long and the lower lobes slightly shorter. The standard petal is orange-yellow with a reddish-brown base and 8–10 mm (0.31–0.39 in) long, the wings are dark red and 6.5–7.7 mm (0.26–0.30 in) long, and the keel dark red and 5.2–7.0 mm (0.20–0.28 in) long. Flowering occurs from May to October and the fruit is a flattened pod 14–27 mm (0.55–1.06 in) long.

== Taxonomy and naming ==
Bossiaea spinescens was first formally described in 1844 by Carl Meissner in Lehmann's Plantae Preissianae from specimens collected near York in 1839. The specific epithet (spinescens) means "somewhat spiny".

== Distribution and habitat ==
This bossiaea grows in heathland and woodland, often amongst granite boulders in the Avon Wheatbelt, Coolgardie, Geraldton Sandplains, Jarrah Forest, Murchison and Swan Coastal Plain biogeographic regions of south-western Western Australia.

== Conservation status ==
Bossiaea spinescens is classified as "not threatened" by the Western Australian Government Department of Biodiversity, Conservation and Attractions.
