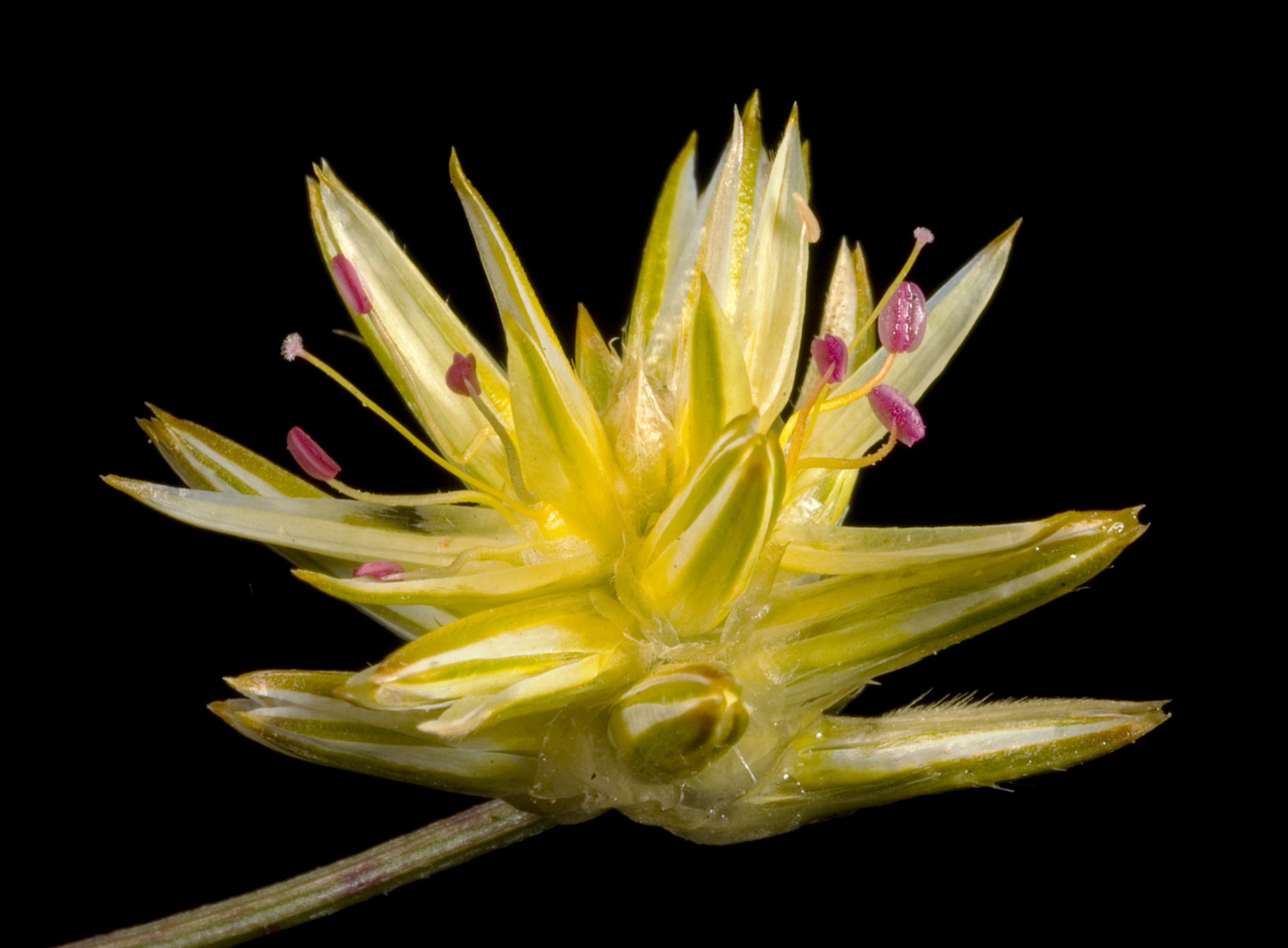

Scientific classification
- Kingdom: Plantae
- Clade: Tracheophytes
- Clade: Angiosperms
- Clade: Eudicots
- Order: Caryophyllales
- Family: Amaranthaceae
- Genus: Ptilotus
- Species: P. gaudichaudii

Binomial name
- Ptilotus gaudichaudii (Steud.) J.M.Black

Synonyms
- Ptilotus gaudichaudii (Steud.) J.M.Black subsp. gaudichaudii; Ptilotus gaudichaudii (Steud.) J.M.Black var. gaudichaudii; Trichinium corymbosum Gaudich. nom. illeg.; Trichinium corymbosum var. ramosum Moq.; Trichinium corymbosum β Nees; Trichinium gaudichaudii Steud.

= Ptilotus gaudichaudii =

Species of grass-like plant

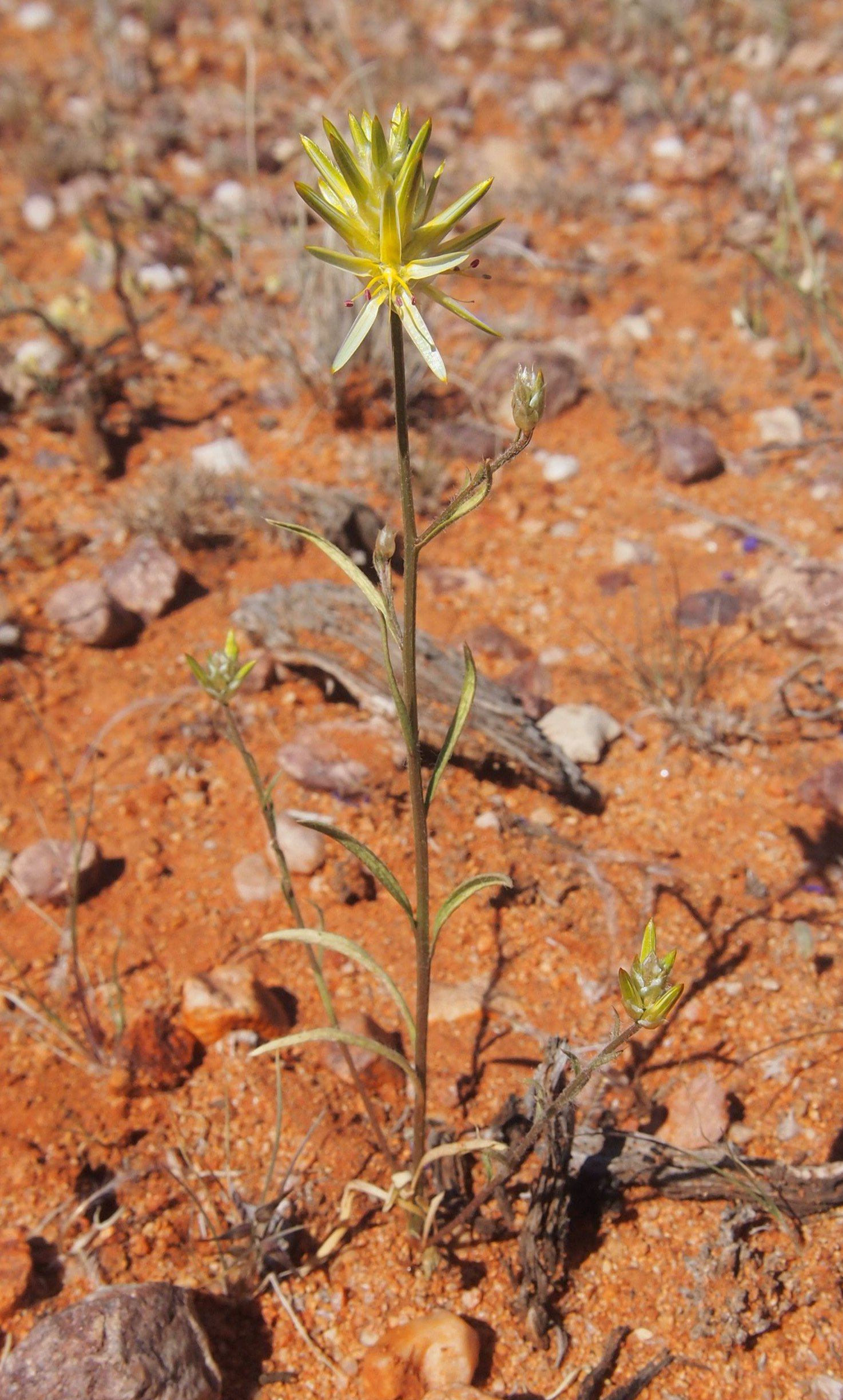
Habit

Ptilotus gaudichaudii, commonly known as paper foxtail, is a species of flowering plant in the family Amaranthaceae and is endemic to Australia. It is an erect annual herb, with linear leaves and spherical to oval, greenish or yellowish spikes of flowers.

== Description ==
Ptilotus gaudichaudii is an erect or ascending annual herb, that typically grows to a height of up to 50 cm (20 in), its stems and leaves with a sparse covering of simple hairs. Its leaves are sessile or on a short petiole, linear to elliptic or lance-shaped, mostly 15–62 mm (0.59–2.44 in) long and 1–6 mm (0.039–0.236 in) wide. The flowers are arranged in short spherical to oval spikes 10–50 mm (0.39–1.97 in) long and up to 20 mm (0.79 in) wide, with egg-shaped to circular colourless bracts mostly 3–5 mm (0.12–0.20 in) long and bracteoles 3.5–6 mm (0.14–0.24 in) long with a prominent midrib. The outer tepals are 11–14 mm (0.43–0.55 in) long and the inner tepals 10.7–13.5 mm (0.42–0.53 in) long. There are 3 stamens and 2 staminodes, the style is 8–10 mm (0.31–0.39 in) long and straight, fixed to the side of the ovary. Flowering occurs from April to October.

== Taxonomy ==
This species was first formally described in 1841 by von Steude who gave it the name Trichinium gaudichaudii in Nomenclator Botanicus. In 1945, John Black transferred the species to Ptilotus as P. gaudichaudii in Transactions of the Royal Society of South Australia. The specific epithet (gaudichaudii) honours Charles Gaudichaud-Beaupré.

== Distribution and habitat ==
Ptilotus gaudichaudii grows on sand, loam or clay and is widespread in Western Australia, South Australia, the Northern Territory, Queensland and a few places in the far west of New South Wales.

== See also ==
- List of Ptilotus species
