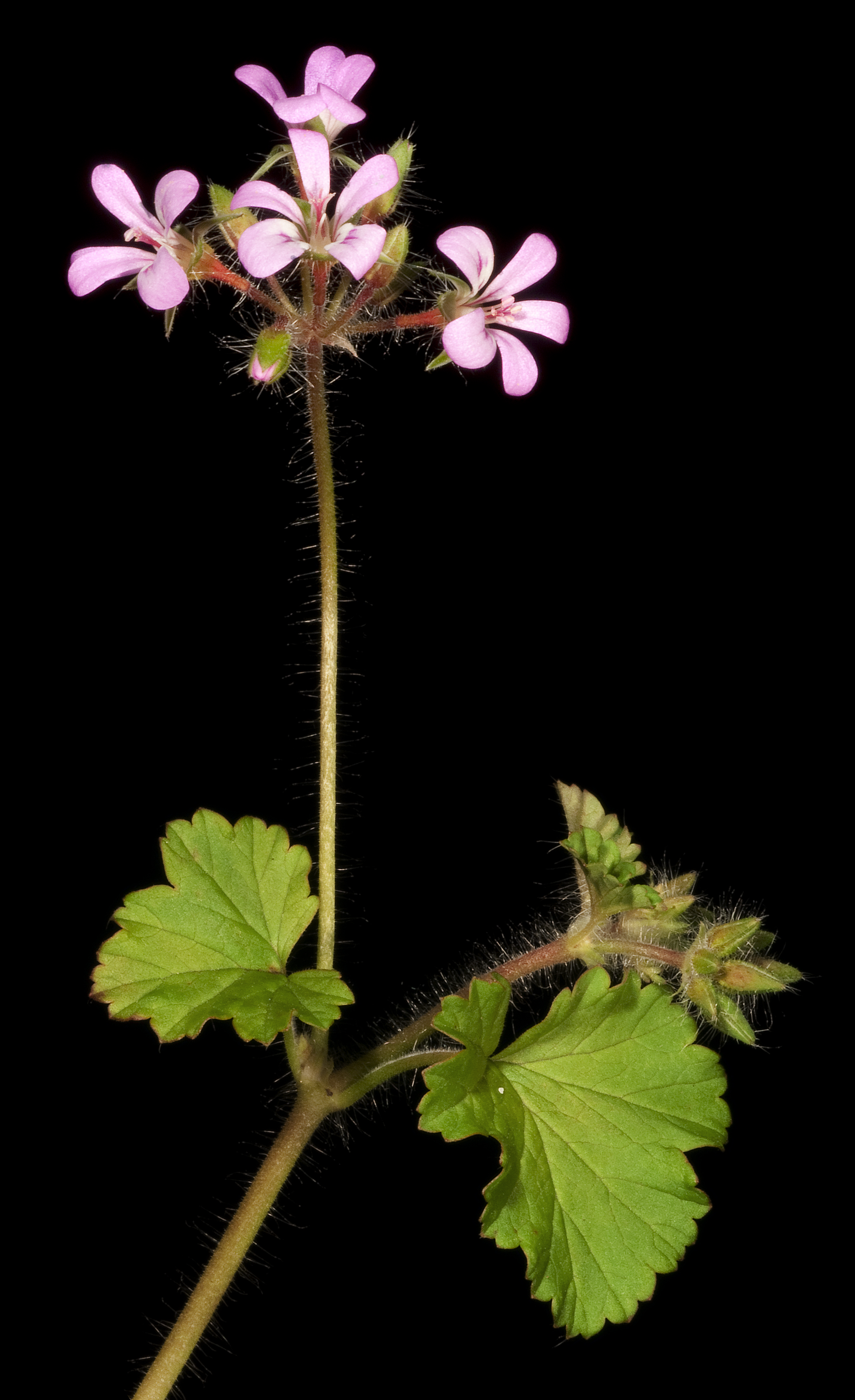

Scientific classification
- Kingdom: Plantae
- Clade: Tracheophytes
- Clade: Angiosperms
- Clade: Eudicots
- Clade: Rosids
- Order: Geraniales
- Family: Geraniaceae
- Genus: Pelargonium
- Species: P. littorale

Binomial name
- Pelargonium littorale Hügel ex Endl.

= Pelargonium littorale =

Species of plant

Pelargonium littorale is a species of Pelargonium found within the southwest botanical province of Australia.

== Description ==
A perennial herb found as an erect or semiprostrate shrub, Pelargonium littorale may be 100 to 500 mm in height. The flowers are pink with a deeper coloration at the center. The species bears a strong resemblance to a co-genor, Pelargonium capitatum; a 'rose scented' species, introduced from South Africa, that occupies a very similar habitat. The species was first described by Karl von Hügel, a plant collector who visited the state in 1837. This was published by Endlicher. It is described as native, not endemic.

== Distribution ==
The plant is found along coastal regions in the province, the range extends from most south eastern corner to the Geraldton Sandplains in the North. An occurrence is also given in South Australia and Victoria.

== Taxonomy ==
The species has been placed within Pelargonium sect. Peristera. A subspecies division has also been applied :

- Pelargonium littorale Huegel subsp. littorale
