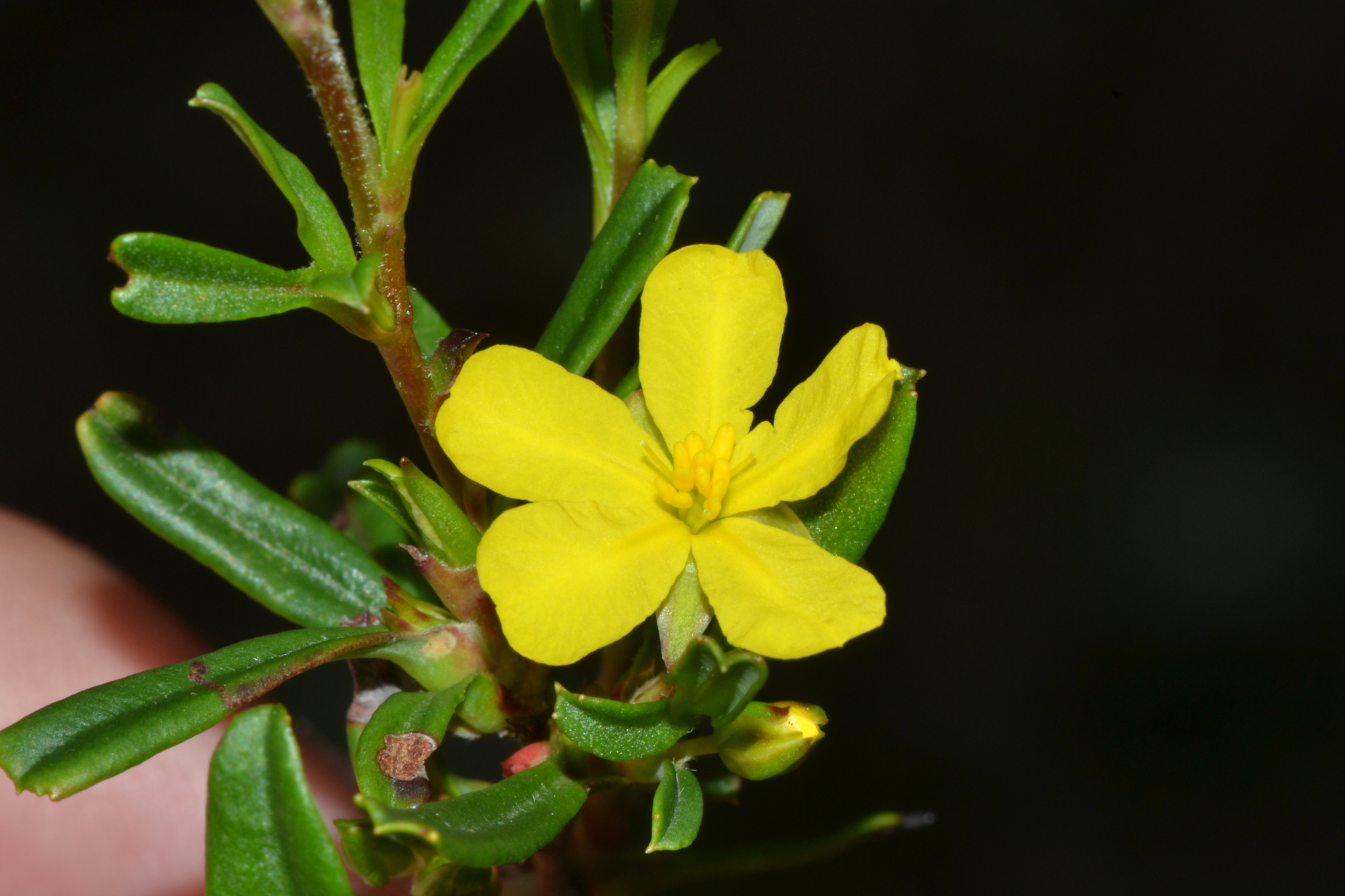
- Hibbertia racemosa in Kenwick Wetlands

Scientific classification
- Kingdom: Plantae
- Clade: Tracheophytes
- Clade: Angiosperms
- Clade: Eudicots
- Order: Dilleniales
- Family: Dilleniaceae
- Genus: Hibbertia
- Species: H. racemosa

Binomial name
- Hibbertia racemosa (Endl.) Gilg

Synonyms
- Candollea racemosa Endl.; Hibbertia racemosa (Endl.) Gilg var. racemosa; Hibbertia triandra C.R.P.Andrews

= Hibbertia racemosa =

Stalked guinea flower

Species of flowering plant

Hibbertia racemosa, commonly known as stalked guinea flower, is a species of flowering plant in the family Dilleniaceae and is endemic to the south-west of Western Australia. It is an erect or ascending, spreading shrub that typically grows to a height of 10–75 cm (3.9–29.5 in) and produces yellow flowers between July and December.

This species was first formally described in 1837 by Stephan Endlicher who gave it the name Candollea racemosa in the journal Enumeratio plantarum quas in Novae Hollandiae ora austro-occidentali ad fluvium Cygnorum et in sinu Regis Georgii collegit Carolus Liber Baro de Hügel from specimens collected near the Swan River at Fremantle. In 1893, Ernest Friedrich Gilg changed the name to Hibbertia racemosa. The specific epithet (racemosa) means "racemose".

Hibbertia racemosa grows on coastal dunes and plains in the Carnarvon, Esperance Plains, Geraldton Sandplains, Jarrah Forest, Mallee, Swan Coastal Plain, Warren and Yalgoo biogeographic regions of south-western Western Australia.

== See also ==
- List of Hibbertia species
