= Aphanopetalum clematideum =

Scientific classification
- Kingdom: Plantae
- Clade: Tracheophytes
- Clade: Angiosperms
- Clade: Eudicots
- Order: Saxifragales
- Family: Aphanopetalaceae
- Genus: Aphanopetalum
- Species: A. clematideum

Binomial name
- Aphanopetalum clematideum (J.Drumm. ex Harv.) Domin

Synonyms
- Aphanopetalum occidentale F.Muell.; Platyptelea clematidea J.Drumm. ex Harv.

Species of flowering plant

Aphanopetalum clematideum is a species of twining shrub or vine in the family Aphanopetalaceae. It grows in the Geraldton Sandplains region of Western Australia. It grows to approximately 5 m high from July to October, and is green-cream/green-yellow in color.
