= Flag Hill (Houtman Abrolhos) =

Flag Hill is the highest hill on East Wallabi Island, and the highest point in the Houtman Abrolhos, an archipelago off the coast of Western Australia. It is located in the north-east of the island; its gazetted location is 28°26′7″S 113°44′14″E, but in fact it is located somewhat east of there at about 28°26′02″S 113°44′18″E. It is about 15 metres (50 ft) high.

Although East Wallabi Island was extensively explored by survivors of the 1629 Batavia shipwreck, no records of that event refer specifically to Flag Hill. Accordingly, discovery of the hill is attributed to John Clements Wickham, Commander during the third voyage of HMS Beagle, which surveyed East Wallabi Island in May 1840. Wickham's lieutenant, John Lort Stokes, later wrote:

"[T]he loftiest point rising on the north-east extreme of E. Wallaby Island, measures no more than 50 feet (15 m).... The loftiest, which is called Flag Hill, is, as I have mentioned, on the north-eastern extreme, and has a long finger-shaped point running out from its foot in a north-east direction.... Flag Hill is a rock formed of sand and comminuted shells."

No explanation for the name "Flag Hill" was given.

From the peak of Flag Hill, Wickham's party sighted an island to the north-north-west; they would later visit it and name it North Island.
