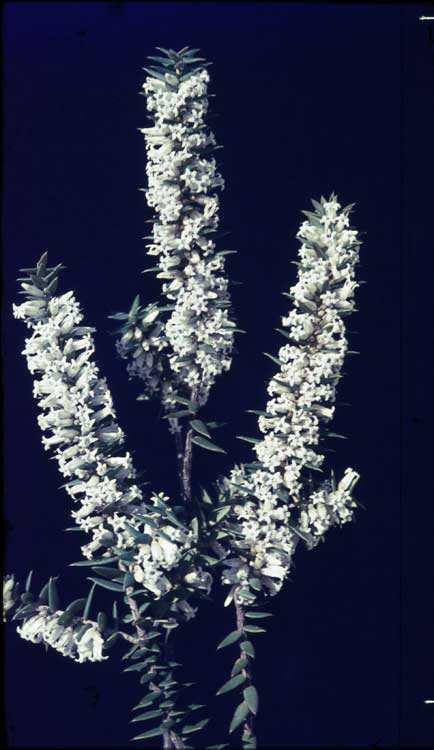

Scientific classification
- Kingdom: Plantae
- Clade: Tracheophytes
- Clade: Angiosperms
- Clade: Eudicots
- Clade: Asterids
- Order: Ericales
- Family: Ericaceae
- Genus: Styphelia
- Species: S. insularis

Binomial name
- Styphelia insularis (A.Cunn. ex DC.) Michael Hislop
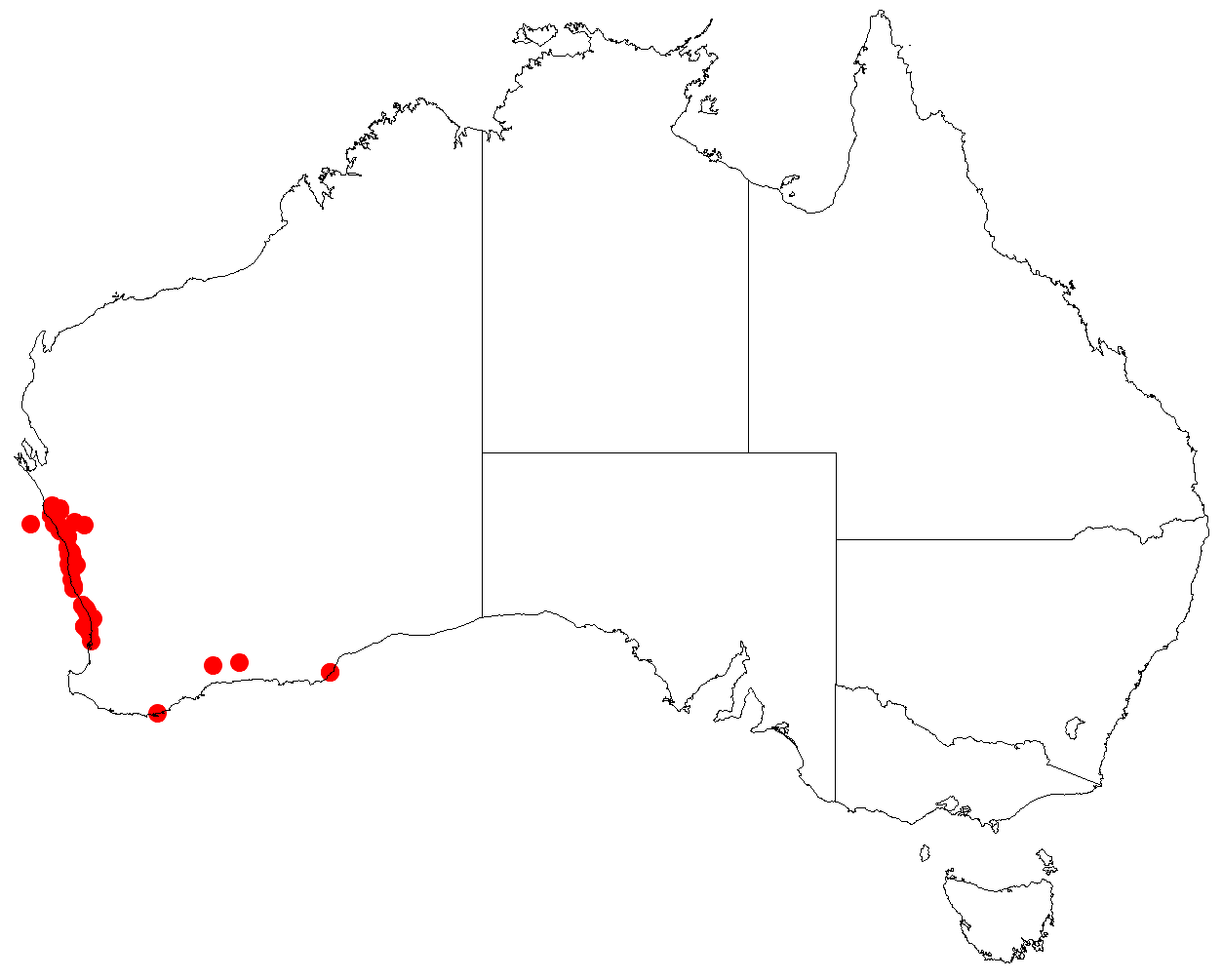
- Occurrence data from AVH

Synonyms
- Leucopogon insularis A.Cunn. ex DC.; Leucopogon oblongifolius Sond. in J.G.C.Lehmann; Styphelia subulifolia F.Muell.

= Styphelia insularis =

Species of plant

Styphelia insularis is a species of flowering plant in the heath family Ericaceae and is endemic to the south-west of Western Australia. It is a rigid, scrubby shrub with many branches, linear or oblong leaves and tube-shaped, white flowers.

== Description ==
Styphelia insularis is a rigid, scrubby shrub that typically grows to a height of about 2 m (6 ft 7 in) and has many branches. Its leaves are linear or oblong, mostly 6.0–8.5 mm (0.24–0.33 in) long with the edges rolled under and a sharp point on the tip. The flowers are borne singly or in pairs in leaf axils on a short peduncle with small bracts, and bracteoles less than half as long as the sepals. The sepals are about 2 mm (0.079 in) long, the petals white, forming a tube shorter than the sepals with lobes sometimes longer than the petal tube, and rolled backwards.

== Taxonomy and naming ==
Styphelia insularis was first formally described in 1839 by Augustin Pyramus de Candolle in his Prodromus Systematis Naturalis Regni Vegetabilis, after an unpublished description by Allan Cunningham of specimens collected on Rottnest Island. In 2020, Michael Clyde Hislop transferred the species to Styphelia as S. insularis in Australian Systematic Botany. The specific epithet (insularis) means "insular", referring to the type location.

== Distribution and habitat ==
This styphelia grows in near-coastal areas of the Geraldton Sandplains and Swan Coastal Plain bioregions of south-western Western Australia.

== Conservation status ==
Styphelia insularis, is listed as "not threatened" by the Government of Western Australia Department of Biodiversity, Conservation and Attractions.
