= Ranunculus sessiliflorus =

Scientific classification
- Kingdom: Plantae
- Clade: Tracheophytes
- Clade: Angiosperms
- Clade: Eudicots
- Order: Ranunculales
- Family: Ranunculaceae
- Genus: Ranunculus
- Species: R. sessiliflorus

Binomial name
- Ranunculus sessiliflorus R.Br. ex DC.

Species of flowering plant

Ranunculus sessiliflorus, common name small-flowered buttercup, is a flowering plant. An annual, it grows in parts of Australia. Its stems can grow up to 35 cm (14 in) in length. It has also been called the rockplate buttercup.

This species has two infraspecies:

- Ranunculus sessiliflorus var. pilulifer (Hook.) Melville
- Ranunculus sessiliflorus var. sessiliflorus
