= Wouter Loos =

Soldier on board the ship Batavia

Wouter Loos was a soldier on board the Dutch East India Company ship Batavia, which sank on Morning Reef in the Wallabi Group of the Houtman Abrolhos Islands off the coast of Western Australia in 1629. Loos had a critical role in the subsequent Batavia Mutiny, becoming the leader of the mutiny after the original leader, Jeronimus Cornelisz (Corneliszoon), was captured.

== Loos' role in the Batavia Mutiny ==
The Batavia Mutiny is well documented. The first account was published in 1647 in Ongeluckige Voyagie, and a detailed and complete translation of Commandeur Francisco Pelsaert's journal was published by Henrietta Drake-Brockman in Voyage to Disaster in 1963.

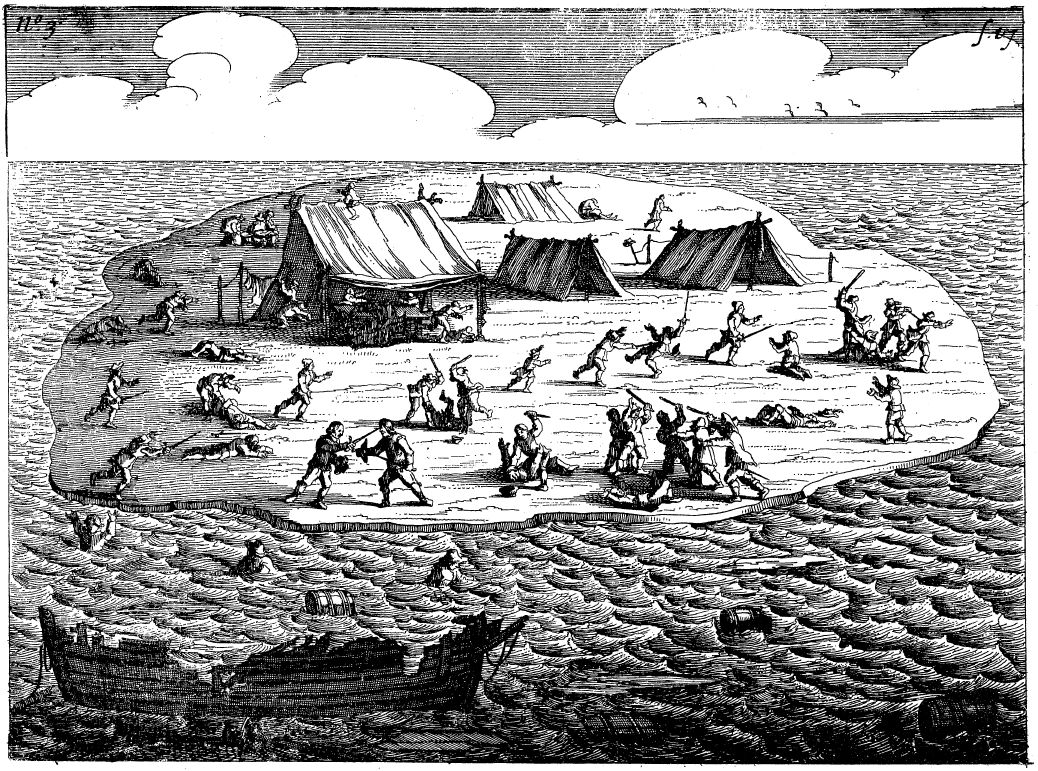
Drawing from Ongeluckige voyagie van 't schip Batavia (1647) of Batavia Mutiny

Loos was aged 24 when the Batavia Mutiny took place. In the course of the mutiny he was accused of being involved in a particularly gruesome and notorious incident in which all the Predikant (minister) Gijsbert Bastiaenszoon's family, apart from his eldest daughter Judith, were massacred in their tent. He was also reported to have bashed in the head of Mayken Cardoes while another mutineer was trying to cut her throat.

There was a dramatic change in Loos's role, however, on 2 September 1629. Corneliszoon had been inept in his tactics in the conflict that had arisen between the mutineers and another group, the defenders, who had been holding out against them. On the pretext of negotiating, Corneliszoon, accompanied by Loos and four other henchmen, had arranged to meet with the defenders. However, the defenders sprang a trap and tried to take Corneliszoon and his henchmen prisoner. Other mutineers nearby immediately prepared to attack, so the defenders killed all their prisoners on the spot, apart from Corneliszoon, and Loos, who managed to escape.

As an anonymous defender described it, "by a ruse we took five of the principal murderers prisoner. Seeing this, the others resorted to their weapons. When we saw this, that our enemies wanted to come upon us, we struck four of them dead." This was done to "avoid being hampered by the prisoners". Consequently, Lance-Corporal Cornelis Pieterszoon, Cadets Conraat van Huyssens and Gysbrecht van Welderen, and Assistant Davidt Zevanck were killed on the spot. With their leader Corneliszoon captured and four of their number killed, the mutineers retired in confusion.

== Loos elected leader of the mutineers ==
The mutineers then regrouped and elected the 24-year-old Loos as their "captain". Being a soldier, Loos was far more adept in his tactics. On the morning of 17 September the mutineers attacked again, this time using their muskets to telling effect. Four defenders were wounded, one, Gunner Jan Dircxszoon from Emden, later dying of his wounds. But as the two-hour battle reached its climax, the Sardam, commanded by Francisco Pelsaert, miraculously appeared.

Forewarned by Wiebbe Hayes, leader of the defenders, that the mutineers intended to capture the Sardam, Pelsaert acted decisively and the mutiny was ended. Pelsaert then set about investigating the mutiny, salvaging the wreck and recovering property. This took a couple of months.

== Investigations of Loos' role in the mutiny ==
Most participants in the mutiny were subject to judicial torture as part of their examination. Loos managed to resist the torture and diminish his culpability, and so he was not among the seven ringleaders who were hanged on Long Island on 2 October 1629. However, on 27 October Pelsaert reopened Loos' investigation, the result of the Predikant's daughter Judith raising his complicity in the massacre of her family. This re-examination revealed the true extent of his involvement. Upon his guilt being determined, the ship's council then made an unusual decision: instead of hanging Loos, he would be marooned on the coast, along with Jan Pelgrom de Bye van Bemel. De Bye, an 18-year-old cabin boy, had been due to be hanged on 2 October, but had been reprieved due to his youth.

== Loos and de Bye marooned on Australian mainland ==
Subsequently, on 16 November 1629, Loos and de Bye were abandoned on the Western Australian coast, probably at the mouth of the Hutt River, with a small boat, trade goods and 'provided with everything.' They were issued a set of instructions which urged them to 'make themselves known to the folk of this land.' Thus Wouter Loos and Jan Pelgrom de Bye became the first Europeans to become resident in Australia, but they were never heard of again.

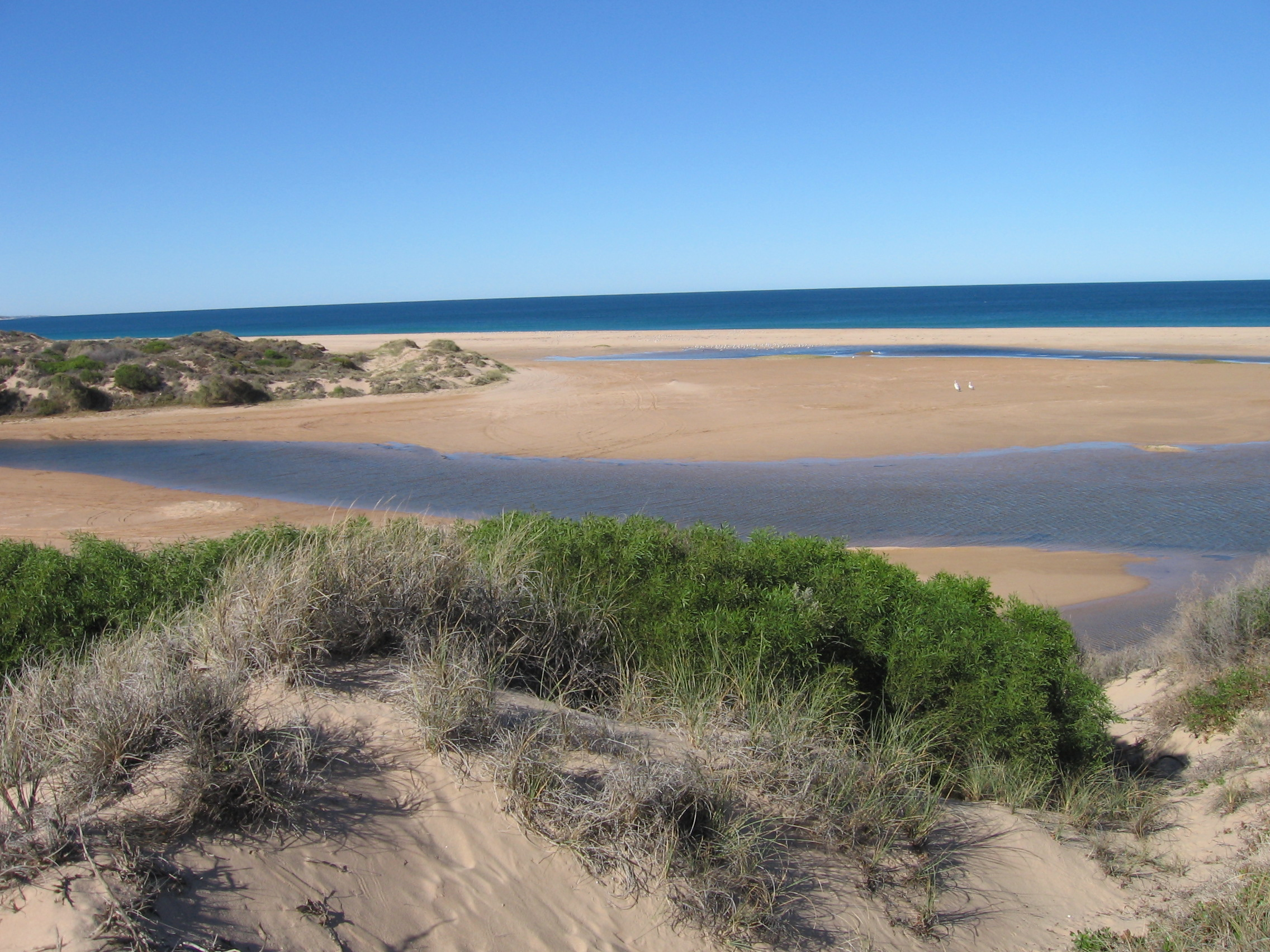
Mouth of the Hutt River

== See also ==
- Dutch East India Company
- Batavia
- Houtman Abrolhos
- Western Australia
- Jeronimus Cornelisz
- Henrietta Drake-Brockman
- Francisco Pelsaert
- Sardam
- Hutt River
- Rupert Gerritsen

== Books ==
- Anonymous "Letter written at sea from Batavia, the 11th Decemb. 1629 in Leyden Ferry-Boat Gossip", in Westerly trans. Randolph Stow, pp. 8–9, April 1972.
- Francisco Pelsaert 'Journal of Francisco Pelsaert' in Henrietta Drake-Brockman (comp.) and E. Drok (trans.) Voyage to Disaster, pp. 122–254. Sydney: Angus and Roberson, 1983
- Rupert Gerritsen 2007 "The debate over where Australia's first European residents were marooned in 1629 – Part 1", Hydrographic Journal 126:20-25.
- Rupert Gerritsen 2009 "The debate over where Australia's first European residents were marooned in 1629 – Part 2", Hydrographic Journal 128-129(2009):35-41.
- Rupert Gerritsen 2011 Australia's First Criminal Prosecutions in 1629. Canberra: Batavia Online Publishing.
- Published Works
