= Wiebbe Hayes Stone Fort =

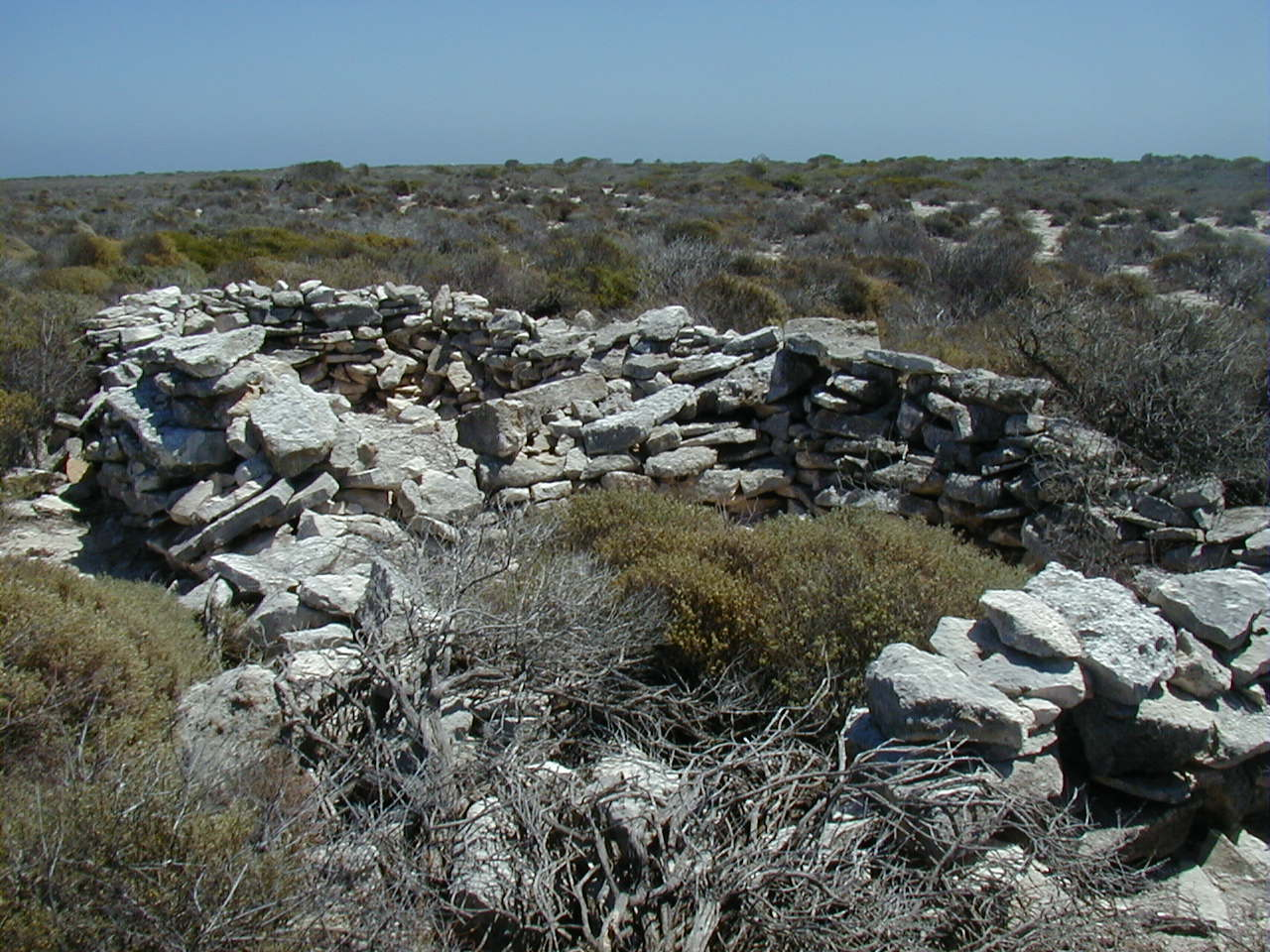
- The fort in 2001

General information
- Type: Defensive structure
- Location: West Wallabi Island, Australia
- Coordinates: 28°27′41″S 113°42′15″E
- Construction started: 1629

Western Australia Heritage Register
- Official name: Ruins of Two Stone Huts
- Type: Heritage Council
- Designated: 31 July 1995
- Part of: Houtman Abrolhos Islands
- Reference no.: 3990

Australian National Heritage List
- Official name: Batavia Shipwreck Site and Survivor Camps Area 1629
- Type: Historic
- Criteria: A, C, D, G
- Designated: 6 April 2006
- Reference no.: 105887

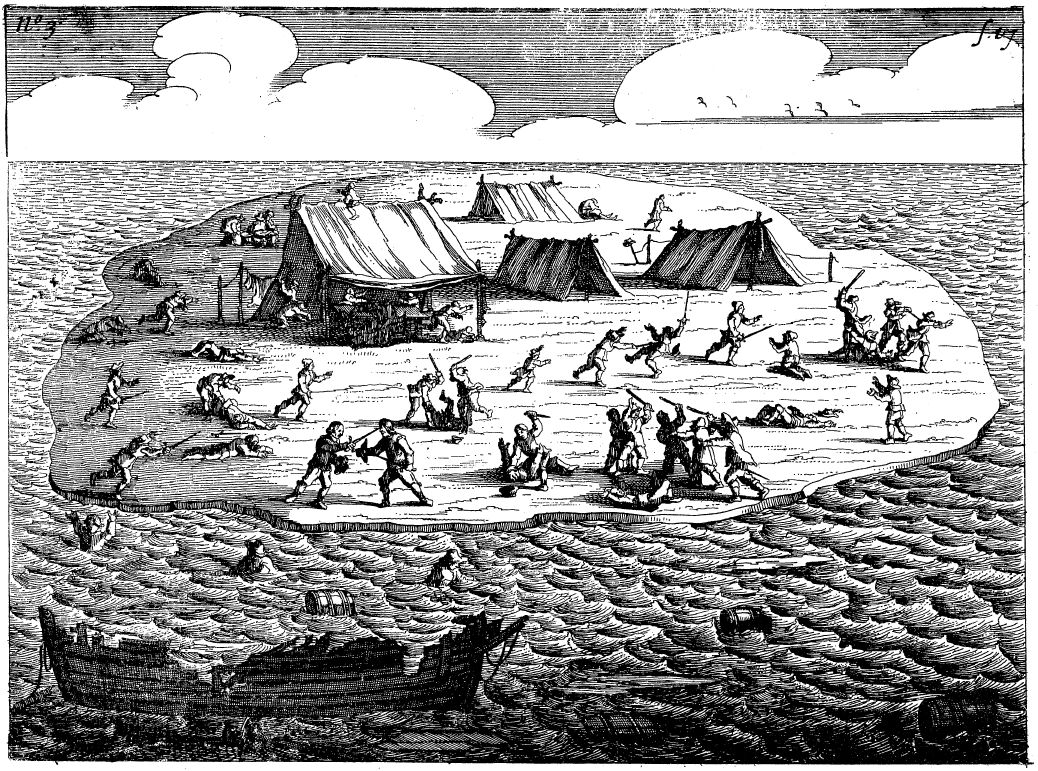
17th century depiction of attack

The Wiebbe Hayes Stone Fort on West Wallabi Island (also known as Wiebbe Hayes Island) is the oldest surviving European building in Australia, and was built in 1629 by survivors of the Batavia shipwreck and massacre. West Wallabi Island is 63 kilometres (39 mi) from the coast of Western Australia.

== History ==
Following the shipwreck of the Batavia in 1629, a group of the marooned soldiers under the command of Wiebbe Hayes were put ashore on East Wallabi Island to search for water. A group of mutineers, led by Jeronimus Cornelisz, took control of the other survivors and left Hayes' group there, secretly hoping that they would starve or die of thirst. However, the soldiers discovered that they were able to wade to West Wallabi Island, where there was a fresh water source. Furthermore, West and East Wallabi Island are the only islands in the group upon which the tammar wallaby lives. Thus the soldiers had access to sources of both food and water that were unavailable to the mutineers.

Later the mutineers mounted a series of attacks, which the soldiers repulsed. The remnants of improvised defensive walls and stone shelters built by Wiebbe Hayes and his men on West Wallabi Island are Australia's oldest known European structures, more than a century and a half before expeditions to the Australian continent by James Cook and Arthur Phillip. The remnants of the fort are:

nothing more than a tiny, sandstone-coloured rectangle in the scrub about 100 metres [110 yd] from the sea. It is unimpressive and isolated and yet this simple structure, just some loose rocks piled up to make a simple fortress, is the first building Europeans constructed in Australia.

== See also ==
- List of the oldest buildings in the world

== Sources ==
- "Batavia". Australian Broadcasting Corporation. 2003.
- Commelin, Isaac, ed. (1649). Ongeluckige Voyagie: Van't schip Batavia na Oost-Indien uyt-gevaren onder de E. Franç̧ois Pelsaert (in Dutch). Utrecht: Lucas de Vries. OCLC 1395245414. OL 23526759M. Wikidata Q139776312.
  - Pelsaert, Francisco (1649). "Journael, Ende Historisch verhael van de Ongeluckige Reyse gedaen naer Oost–Indien". In Commelin (1649), pp. 7–44.
- "National Heritage Places - Batavia Shipwreck Site and Survivor Camps Area 1629 - Houtman Abrolhos". Department of Agriculture, Water and the Environment, Government of Western Australia. 2020.
- Elder, Bruce (30 July 2005). "The brutal shore". The Sydney Morning Herald.
- Pearson, Michael (2005). Cresswell, Margaret (ed.). Great Southern Land: The Maritime Exploration of Terra Australis (PDF). Canberra: Department of the Environment and Heritage. ISBN 0-642-55185-5. OCLC 67617194. OL 26818732M. Wikidata Q110529184. Archived from the original (PDF) on 4 October 2023.
- "The Batavia Story". Visit Geraldton. 2026.
- Whincup, Paul (28 February 2026). "Wiebbe Hayes Fort, Abrolhos Islands, Western Australia: Construction of the Oldest European Building in Australia". Journal of the Royal Society of Western Australia. 109 (109). doi:10.70880/001c.157854. "The 27 VOC soldiers led by Wiebbe Hayes [...] were dropped on to East Wallabi Island on 20 June [...]. Wiebbe Hayes and his men spent 20 days looking for a permanent water supply on East Wallabi Island without success before wading across a low tide causeway to West Wallabi Island."
