= Lucretia Jans =

Survivor of Batavia mutiny (born 1602)

- Born: 1602; Amsterdam, Dutch Republic
- Known for: Surviving the massacre following the Batavia shipwreck
- Spouses: Boudewijn van der Mijlen; Jacob Cornelisz Cuick
- Parents: Jans (or Hans) Meynertsz; Steffanie Joosten

Lucretia Jans, or Lucretia van der Mijlen (1602 in Amsterdam – fl. 1641), was a survivor of the events that followed the sinking of the Dutch East India Company (VOC) vessel Batavia in 1629.

She was the daughter of merchant Jans (or Hans) Meynertsz and Steffanie Joosten. She was married in 1620 to Boudewijn van der Mijlen (c. 1599 – 1629), a diamond cutter, and in 1630, after her first husband's death, to Sergeant Jacob Cornelisz Cuick.

== Batavia ==
In October 1628, Jans departed the Netherlands on the Batavia to join her husband in Batavia (now Jakarta) on Java, the capital of the VOC. On 4 June 1629, the ship foundered upon the reefs of the Houtman Abrolhos Islands off the western coast of Australia. Francisco Pelsaert, the ship's commander, and its skipper left with a team for Batavia to seek help. Meanwhile, Jeronimus Cornelisz, the most senior VOC official left behind, started terrorising the other survivors with the intent of creating a pirate ship. Some were murdered and some of the women were used as sex slaves, with Cornelisz reserving Jans for himself.

When the rescue team arrived from Batavia, Cornelisz was executed at the scene of the crime, and the rest were put on trial in Batavia. During the trial, it was alleged that Jans was guilty of "provocation, encouraging evil acts and murdering the survivors … some of whom lost their lives owing to her backhandedness". Jans was put on trial and denied the charges. The court applied for permission to torture her, but it is unknown whether such permission was granted; she seems to have been acquitted of the charges. She returned to the Netherlands in 1635.

In 1647, the mutiny was described in the publication Ongeluckige voyagie van 't schip Batavia (transl. unlucky voyage of the ship Batavia), based on the trial. That led to a change of the law that made reference to the case and limited female passengers on ships on the grounds that their presence led to disturbances.

== Legacy ==
The opera Batavia, commissioned by Opera Australia, is based on the historical events surrounding the ship.

== Sources ==
- Commelin, Isaac, ed. (1649). Ongeluckige Voyagie: Van't schip Batavia na Oost-Indien uyt-gevaren onder de E. Franç̧ois Pelsaert (in Dutch). Utrecht: Lucas de Vries. OCLC 1395245414. OL 23526759M. Wikidata Q139776312.
  - Pelsaert, Francisco (1649). "Journael, Ende Historisch verhael van de Ongeluckige Reyse gedaen naer Oost–Indien". In Commelin (1649), pp. 7–44.
- Pelsaert, Francisco (1994) [1629]. Huystee, Marit van (ed.). The Batavia Journal of François Pelsaert (PDF) (Report). Report—Department of Maritime Archaeology, Western Australian Maritime Museum. Translated by Huystee, Marit van. Algemeen Rijksarchief (ARA), The Hague, Netherlands, Document 1630: 1098 QQII, fol.232–316. Fremantle, Western Australia. Archived (PDF) from the original on 9 March 2020.
- Roeper, Vibeke (13 January 2014). "Jans, Lucretia (ca. 1602-na 1641)". Digitaal Vrouwenlexicon van Nederland (DVN) (in Dutch). Huygens ING. Archived from the original on 16 April 2018.
- Batavia (1629): giving voice to the voiceless – Symposium (PDF) (booklet). Nedlands: University of Western Australia. 7 October 2017. Archived (PDF) from the original on 20 March 2018.
