= Wiebbe Hayes =

Leader of resistance to Batavia Mutiny

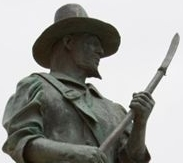
- Hayes' statue in Geraldton, Western Australia
- Born: Unknown date, c. 1587; Winschoten, Dutch Republic
- Died: Unknown date Unknown location
- Military career
- Allegiance: Dutch East India Company
- Rank: Lieutenant
- Conflict(s): Shipwreck of the Batavia

Wiebbe Hayes (born c. 1587) was a Dutch soldier known for his leading role in the suppression of Jeronimus Cornelisz's massacre of shipwreck survivors in 1629, after the merchant ship Batavia was wrecked in the Houtman Abrolhos, a chain of coral islands off the west coast of Australia.

Almost all that is known of the shipwreck and aftermath stems from a book by the expedition's commander, Francisco Pelsaert, who quickly absented himself after the shipwreck and reached safety before returning with the Sardam to rescue the survivors.

== Early life ==
Little more is known about Wiebbe Hayes's background and early life than that he is known to have come from the small town of Winschoten in the province of Groningen. Because Hayes could read and write, it is believed he had at least some basic formal education, and thus it is inferred that he was probably from a respectable, but impoverished family.

== Batavia ==
=== Shipwreck ===
In October 1628, Hayes boarded the Batavia with about 70 other privates. Employed by the Dutch East India Company (Dutch: Vereenigde Oostindische Compagnie, commonly abbreviated to VOC), the soldiers were off to the Dutch East Indies for five years of garrison duty at Batavia. Most of the soldiers were young men in their late teens or early twenties.

On the night of 3 June 1629, the Batavia was running under full sail when the look-out thought he saw breaking whitewater over shallows. He warned the skipper, Ariaen Jacobsz, who decided not to change course, believing that it was a reflection of the moon. Shortly afterwards, the Batavia 1628 (2) ran aground at full speed on a coral reef near the Wallabi Group of islands. Attempts to refloat her failed, and she subsequently broke up.

It was at this point that Hayes was noticed by the VOC chief merchant, Francisco Pelsaert. As sailors and soldiers helped in the process of ferrying people to the nearby islands, Hayes was there helping passengers down, passing supplies, offering soothing words, directing commands, and doing whatever was needed to be done to accomplish the hazardous tasks as safely as possible.

=== Massacre ===
Francisco Pelsaert and skipper Ariaen Jacobsz realised that there was only one chance of rescue for the survivors. Thus four days after the shipwreck, they—along with about 40 others—sailed in an open boat for Java in order to get help. With Pelsaert and Jacobsz gone, the VOC under-merchant Jeronimus Cornelisz, who was neither a sailor nor a soldier, was the most senior official. Cornelisz had been plotting a mutiny prior to the shipwreck, and had planned along with his co-conspirators to use the Batavia for piracy. Following the shipwreck, Cornelisz and his supporters now plotted instead to seize control of the rescue ship when it arrived. Before this could be done, however, he needed to neutralize those in the ship's company who potentially stood in his way.

At some point early in the shipwreck, a hardy and loyal group of soldiers had spontaneously gathered around Wiebbe Hayes. Hayes was an ordinary soldier, but during the events and hardships they had just experienced, he must have shown uncommon qualities of natural leadership and courage, which had earned him the respect and trust of his comrades. Records show that Hayes had stepped out of obscurity to become a rallying point for many survivors. After Pelsaert departed for help, Hayes and the other soldiers constructed shelters and set up a small piece of sail in such a fashion that it both provided shelter from the wind and collected whatever rain might fall, funnelling it down into a waiting barrel. Hayes also organised a systematic search for water on the island.

Hayes' leadership qualities did not go unnoticed by Cornelisz and his followers. Arguing that the survivors lacked space and resources at Beacon Island, Cornelisz hand-picked Hayes, along with about 20 other men including a number of soldiers, to explore for fresh water on two large nearby islands, now known as West and East Wallabi Islands. Cornelisz persuaded Hayes and his associates to leave behind their weapons before conducting their search. He assumed the men would not find water, and that they would either die of thirst or return unarmed and unsuspecting to Beacon Island, whereupon they could be easily disposed of.

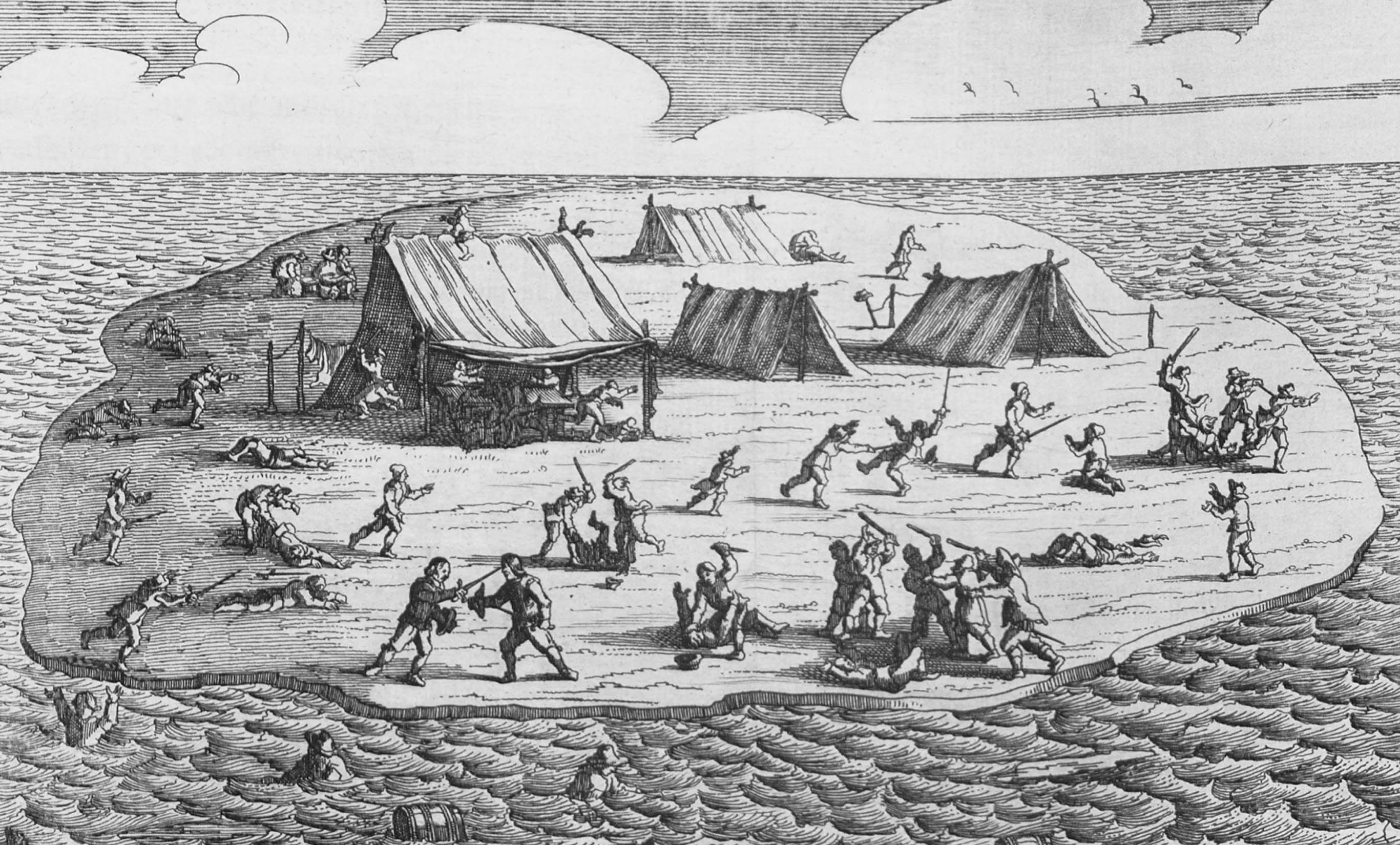
Massacre of the Batavia's survivors on Beacon Island

With his potential opponents out of the way, Cornelisz and his followers subsequently began a reign of terror on the island, raping, murdering, and terrorizing the helpless passengers and crew who were not part of their conspiracy. Nearly three weeks after Hayes' departure to the "high islands," a smoke signal was received from one of them; Wiebbe Hayes and his soldiers had found fresh water. This complicated matters greatly for Cornelisz, who had believed the stranded group were either dead or dying. First, it meant they had a means to survive. Secondly, he was in danger of their warning any rescue ship approaching. Initially, Cornelisz ignored the smoke, and Hayes wondered why no one came to their island. Then, in the days that followed, a small group of survivors from Cornelisz's reign of terror began to drift across the lagoon to Hayes' location on makeshift rafts with stories of atrocities including rape, murder, and massacre.

Despite being outranked by two cadets and other VOC officials, Hayes took command of the group and acted quickly to organise a defence of the island. He improvised weapons such as cudgels, pikes, and planks from the Batavia wreckage with 41-centimetre-long (16 in) carpenter's nails driven through them. On the top of a slope, which the attackers would have to climb after landing, he used dry stones to build a small fort, erected near the freshwater well. Within the enclosure, his men piled up a large heap of heavy rocks and sharp stones to hurl at the attackers should they attempt to storm the fort.

During August and September, Cornelisz's gang made three attempts to take the island, but were repelled each time. On the third attempt, Cornelisz himself was taken prisoner and his best three lieutenants were killed. As a result, the rest of the mutineers fled in panic. On 17 September, the mutineers made a fourth and final attempt to take the island armed with two muskets and were winning the battle by firing from a distance. In the very midst of hostilities, however, a sail unexpectedly appeared on the horizon—that of the small VOC ship Sardam under the command of Pelsaert, who had returned. Hayes once again acted more quickly than the mutineers, and organized a party to row to the rescue ship, warning them of the mutineers' intentions. When the mutineers reached Pelsaert's vessel, they found their scheme had been discovered, and surrendered without a fight, some of them breaking down and spontaneously confessing to horrendous crimes.

=== Aftermath ===
Pelsaert promoted Hayes on the spot to the rank of sergeant at a salary of 18 guilders per month—twice his former wage—and placed him in charge of all surviving soldiers. Upon arriving at Batavia, Wiebbe Hayes became a national hero, was decorated by the VOC and was promoted to the rank of standard-bearer, with another significant increase in pay.

The record of the promotion is also the last time Hayes is mentioned in the Dutch archives, and therefore nothing is known of his subsequent fate. He is remembered by his actions that bear witness to his strength of character, military ability, natural leadership, good judgement, and courage. The remnants of defensive walls and stone shelters built by Wiebbe Hayes and his men on West Wallabi Island are Australia's oldest known European structures. The Wiebbe Hayes Stone Fort and the well can still be seen to this day.

In the 1970s, the wreck of the Batavia was located and many artifacts were salvaged. Some of them are now on exhibition at the Batavia Gallery in Fremantle, Western Australia.
