= Batavia (1628 ship) =

Dutch East India Company flagship

Coordinates: 28°29′25″S 113°47′36″E

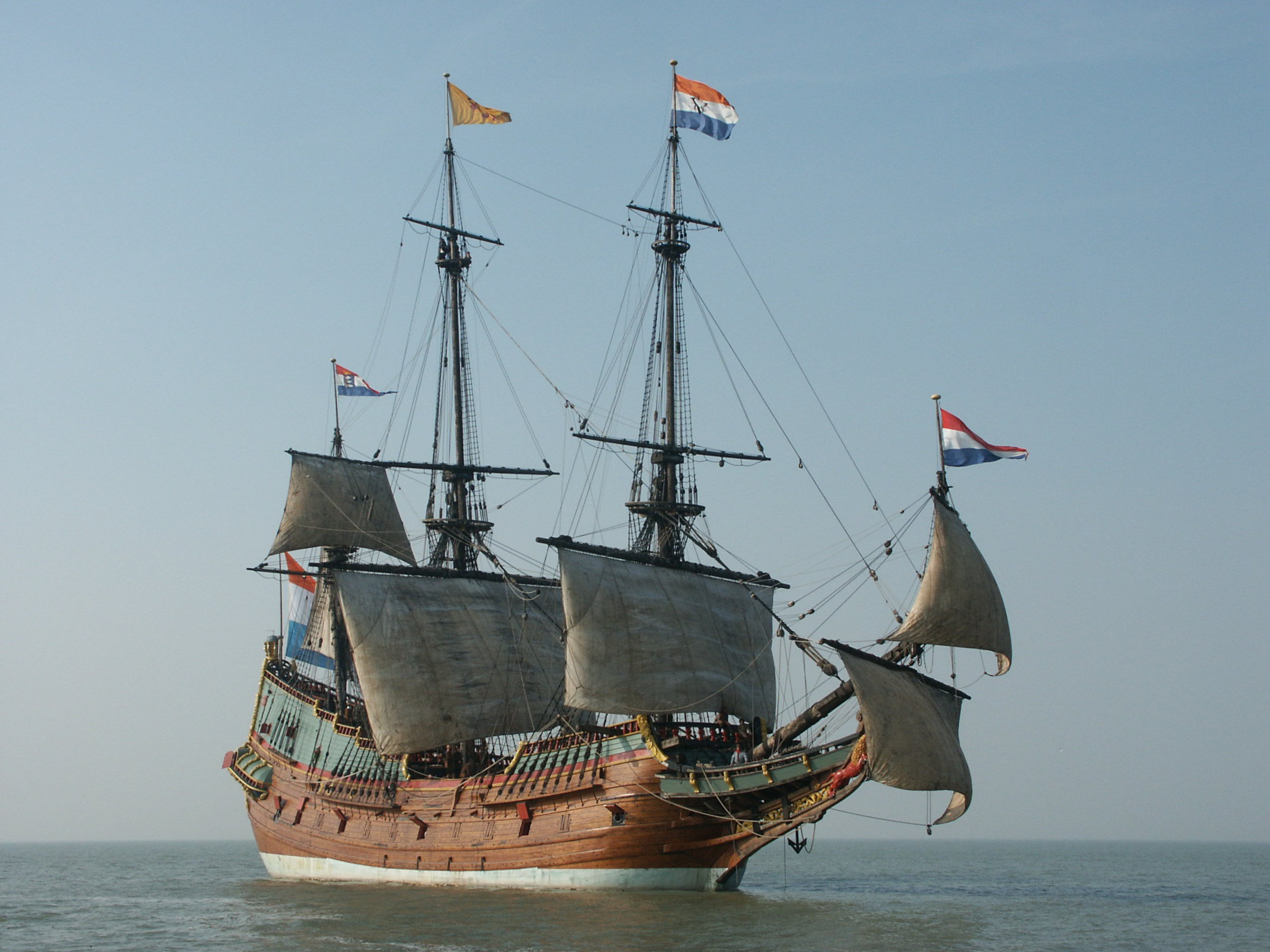
- Full-scale replica of Batavia

History

Dutch Republic
- Namesake: Batavia, Dutch East Indies
- Owner: Dutch East India Company (VOC)
- Completed: 1628
- Maiden voyage: 29 October 1628
- Fate: Wrecked in Wallabi Group, Houtman Abrolhos, 4 June 1629

General characteristics
- Class & type: East Indiaman
- Tonnage: 600 tons
- Length: 45.3 meters (149 feet)
- Beam: 10.19 meters (33.4 feet)
- Depth of hold: 5.45 meters (17.9 feet)
- Sail plan: Full-rigged
- Complement: 341 passengers and crew
- Speed: 5 knots (9.3 km/h; 5.8 mph)
- Armament: at least 22 cast-iron cannon, 6 bronze, 2 composite

Batavia (Dutch pronunciation: [baːˈtaːvijaː]) was a ship of the Dutch East India Company (VOC). She was built in Amsterdam in 1628 as the flagship of one of the three annual fleets of company ships and sailed that year on her maiden voyage for Batavia, capital of the Dutch East Indies. On 4 June 1629, Batavia was wrecked on the Houtman Abrolhos, a chain of small islands off Western Australia.

As the ship broke apart, approximately 300 of the Batavia's 341 passengers and crew made their way ashore, the rest drowning in their attempts. Her commander, Francisco Pelsaert, sailed nearly 3,000 kilometres (1,900 mi) over 33 days in an open longboat to Batavia, present-day Jakarta, to get help, leaving in charge senior VOC official Jeronimus Cornelisz, unaware the latter had been plotting a mutiny prior to the wreck. Cornelisz tricked about 20 men under soldier Wiebbe Hayes into searching for fresh water on nearby islands, leaving them to die. With the help of other mutineers, he then orchestrated a massacre that, over the course of several weeks, resulted in the murder of approximately 125 of the remaining survivors, including women, children and infants; a small number of women were kept as sex slaves.

Meanwhile, Hayes' group had unexpectedly found fresh water and, after learning of the atrocities, waged battles with Cornelisz's group. In October 1629, at the height of their last and deadliest battle, they were interrupted by the return of Pelsaert aboard the rescue vessel Sardam. Pelsaert subsequently tried and convicted Cornelisz and six of his men, who became the first Europeans to be legally executed in Australia. Two other mutineers, convicted of comparatively minor crimes, were marooned on mainland Australia, thus becoming the first Europeans to permanently inhabit the Australian continent, although nothing more was heard of them. Only 122 of the original passengers made it to the port of Batavia.

Associated today with "one of the worst horror stories in maritime history", Batavia has been the subject of numerous published histories. Due to its unique place in the history of European contact with Australia, the story of Batavia is sometimes offered as an alternative founding narrative to the landing of the First Fleet in Sydney.

Of the 47 or so VOC wrecks that have been located and identified, Batavia is the only early 17th-century example from which the remaining hull components have been retrieved, conserved, and subjected to detailed study. Many Batavia artifacts are housed at the Western Australian Shipwrecks Museum in Fremantle, while a replica of the ship is moored as a museum ship in Lelystad, in the Netherlands.

== Construction ==
In the 16th and 17th centuries, the Dutch were the major shipbuilders of northern Europe, innovating both designs (e.g. the Fluyt) and technology (the windmill driven sawmill). They did, though, use the "bottom-based" construction sequence, which uses a shell-first system for the lower part of the hull. The planks are shaped and then laid edge to edge, having the appearance of carvel construction, but are put in position before the frames are installed. The shape of the bottom of the hull is therefore derived from the shaping of the hull planks. (Note: Clinker construction is an example of shell-first building, with the shape of the hull derived from the way the planks are fitted together. The frames (or ribs) are added later. Carvel construction is generally considered to have a sequence in which the frames are erected on the keel and then planked over: "frame first". Historically, this is an oversimplification, as carvel could also have a "frame led" construction sequence, with phases of framing, then planking, then further frame components being added (and so on). Many vessels built in Holland in the 16th and 17th centuries had the bottom of their hulls built plank first: bottom-based construction. The planks were shaped and then clamped together, being held with temporary cleats. The shape of the planks determined the shape of the lower part of the hull. Then the floors were shaped to fit the hull and installed. The frames continued with the first futtocks being fitted to the planking (but not to the floors), and these were then planked. The sequence then continued with second futtocks being fastened to the installed planking, then new planks added up the side of the hull. So we see the "floating futtock" which is only attached to planking and not to the floors or other futtocks. Early versions of carvel construction also had floating futtocks if the "frame led" construction sequence was followed.) The "bottom-based" construction sequence is the same as used on Medieval cogs and some argue that this is an older Romano-Celtic building tradition.

Ships belonging to the Dutch East India Company (VOC) were generally built in the company's own shipyards. The VOC issued charters which gave detailed specifications for these ships; these were updated from time to time. The charters gave a range of key hull dimensions and scheduled the sizes of the scantlings. However, the designs did not exist as plans or drawings that determined the shape of the hull. Unlike ships built for European trade, the VOC East Indiamen were planked with a double skin of oak structural planking. This was sheathed with a double layer of pine which incorporated tar and animal hair, together with closely spaced iron nails. The pine layer was intended to resist teredo worm.

The length to beam ratio of Batavia was 4.4:1. This made her narrower than preceding VOC ships. A 1619 VOC shipbuilding charter gives a length to beam ratio of 3.9:1. It is suggested that there was a trend for VOC to have increasingly narrower designs in the early part of the 17th century. All VOC ships had a relatively high length to beam ratio, covering a range of 3.7:1 to 4.5:1. This was at a time when a 3:1 ratio would not have been unusual.

Batavia, in common with other Dutch ships of the time, was built from oak imported from the forests bordering the Vistula. The Dutch trade in timber from the Baltic, particularly oak, dates back to the early 13th century. (By the early 17th century, Dutch merchants dominated the European timber trade.) Oak from the Vistula region ceased to be used after 1643. It is possible that Dutch shipbuilding had, by then, been a cause of deforestation of the area. (Note: An alternative theory for the Vistula ceasing to be a source of oak is the Thirty Years' War and war between Sweden and Poland in 1655-1660. However, the evidence suggests that all Dutch trade to the Baltic remained remarkably resilient, despite these wars.)

Batavia may have been one of two ships specified in the VOC shipbuilding charter of 29 March 1626 – normally it took 18 months to build one of these vessels, so a small delay would fit the dates. The name Batavia was chosen on 29 June 1628. The leaders of the VOC pushed for the ship to be ready for the next fleet (consisting of five other ships), which was due to leave in September or October 1628. Batavia would be the flagship of this fleet.

== Maiden voyage ==
On 29 October 1628, the newly built Batavia, commissioned by the VOC, sailed from Texel in the Netherlands for the Dutch East Indies, to obtain spices. Their orders were to use the Brouwer Route, like all ships of the Dutch East India Company. This involved sailing to the south of a direct course to Jakarta, but without any way of measuring longitude, it was difficult to judge when to make the turn north. A late turn gave the risk of running aground on the coast of Australia.

She sailed under commander and senior merchant Francisco Pelsaert, with Ariaen Jacobsz serving as skipper. Pelsaert and Jacobsz had previously encountered each other in Dutch Suratte, when Pelsaert publicly dressed-down Jacobsz after he became drunk and insulted Pelsaert in front of other merchants. Animosity existed between the two men after this incident. Also on board was the junior merchant Jeronimus Cornelisz, a bankrupt apothecary from Haarlem who was fleeing the Netherlands, in fear of arrest because of his heretical beliefs associated with the painter Johannes van der Beeck.

=== Mutiny plot ===
According to Pelsaert's account, Jacobsz and Cornelisz conceived a plan to take the ship during the voyage, which would allow them to start a new life elsewhere, using the huge supply of trade gold and silver on board. After leaving the Cape of Good Hope, where they had stopped for supplies, Jacobsz is alleged by Pelsaert to have deliberately steered the ship off course, and away from the rest of the fleet. Jacobsz and Cornelisz had already gathered a small group of men around them and arranged an incident from which the mutiny was to ensue. This involved sexually assaulting Lucretia Jans, a passenger, in order to provoke Pelsaert into disciplining the crew. They hoped to paint his discipline as unfair and recruit more members out of sympathy. However, Jans was unable to identify her attackers.

=== Shipwreck ===
Shipwreck location near the Western Australian coast

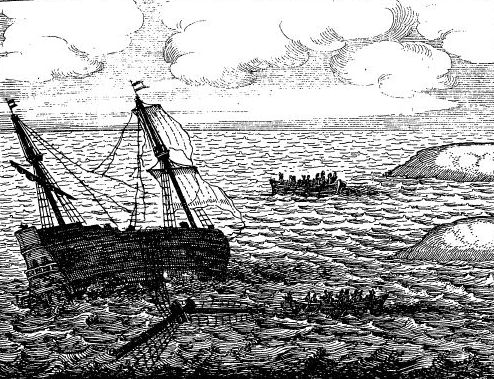
Survivors being transferred from the wrecked Batavia to nearby islands in the ship's boats.

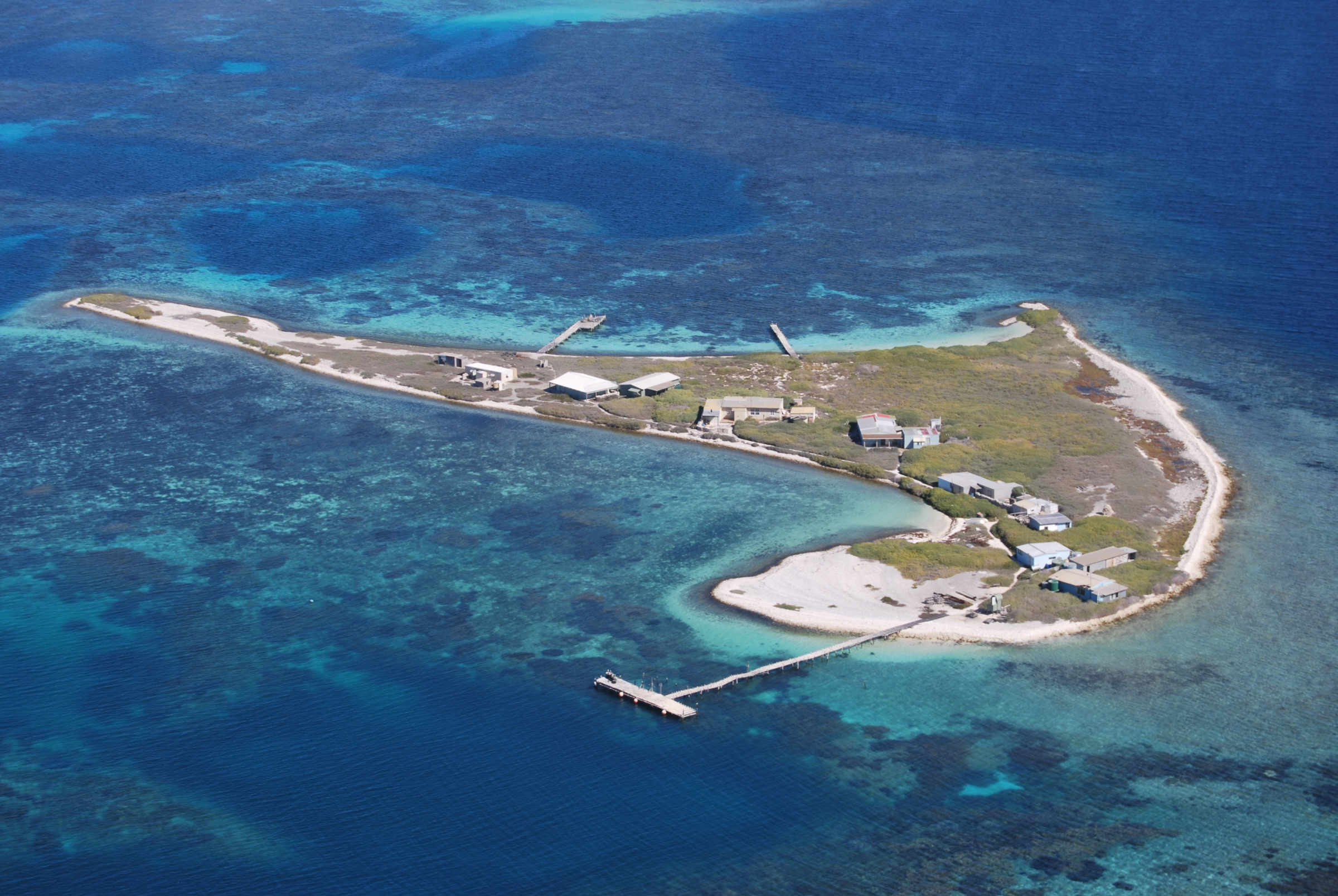
Batavia's Graveyard, now known as Beacon Island, in the Wallabi Group, Abrolhos Islands

On 4 June 1629, Batavia struck Morning Reef near Beacon Island, part of the Houtman Abrolhos off the western coast of Australia. Of the 322 aboard, most of the passengers and crew managed to get ashore, although 40 people drowned. The survivors, including all the women and children, were then transferred to nearby islands in the ship's longboat and yawl.

An initial survey of the islands found no fresh water and only limited food (sea lions and birds). Pelsaert realised the dire situation and decided to search for water on the mainland. A group consisting of Jacobsz, Pelsaert, senior officers, a few crew members, and some passengers left the wreck site in the longboat in search of drinking water. After an unsuccessful search for water on the mainland, they left the other survivors and headed north in a danger-fraught voyage to the city of Batavia, Dutch East Indies, the ship's namesake, to seek rescue. (Batavia was in the area of what is now Jakarta.) The longboat was slightly over nine-metre (30 ft) in length. The sides were raised for the journey with extra planks, but there was still a limited freeboard of about 0.61 metres (2 ft). The boat was equipped with 10 oars and one mast. It was dangerously overloaded, with a total of 48 people on board; all who were with Pelsaert, aware of the absence of water near the wreck, had insisted on staying with the boat. En route the crew made further forays onto the mainland in search of fresh water.

In his journal, Pelsaert stated that on 15 June 1629, they sailed through a channel between a reef and the coast, finding an opening around midday at a latitude guessed to be about 23 degrees south where they were able to land, and water was found. The group spent the night on land. Pelsaert commented on the vast number of termite mounds in the vicinity and the plague of flies that afflicted them. Pelsaert stated that they continued north with the intention of finding the "river of Jacob Remmessens", identified first in 1622, but owing to the wind were unable to land. Drake-Brockman has suggested that this location is to be identified with Yardie Creek.

It was not until the longboat reached the island of Nusa Kambangan in the Dutch East Indies that Pelsaert and the others found more water. The journey took 33 days, with everyone surviving. After their arrival in Batavia, the boatswain, Jan Evertsz, was arrested and executed for negligence and "outrageous behaviour" before the loss of the ship (he was suspected to have been involved). Jacobsz was also arrested for negligence, although his culpability in the potential mutiny was not guessed by Pelsaert.

Governor-General Jan Pieterszoon Coen immediately gave Pelsaert command of Sardam to rescue the other survivors, as well as to attempt to salvage riches from Batavia's wreck. Within a month, Pelsaert reached the general area where the shipwreck had occurred, but it took another month of searching to locate the islands again. He finally arrived at the site only to discover that a bloody massacre had taken place among the survivors, reducing their numbers by at least a hundred.

=== Murders ===
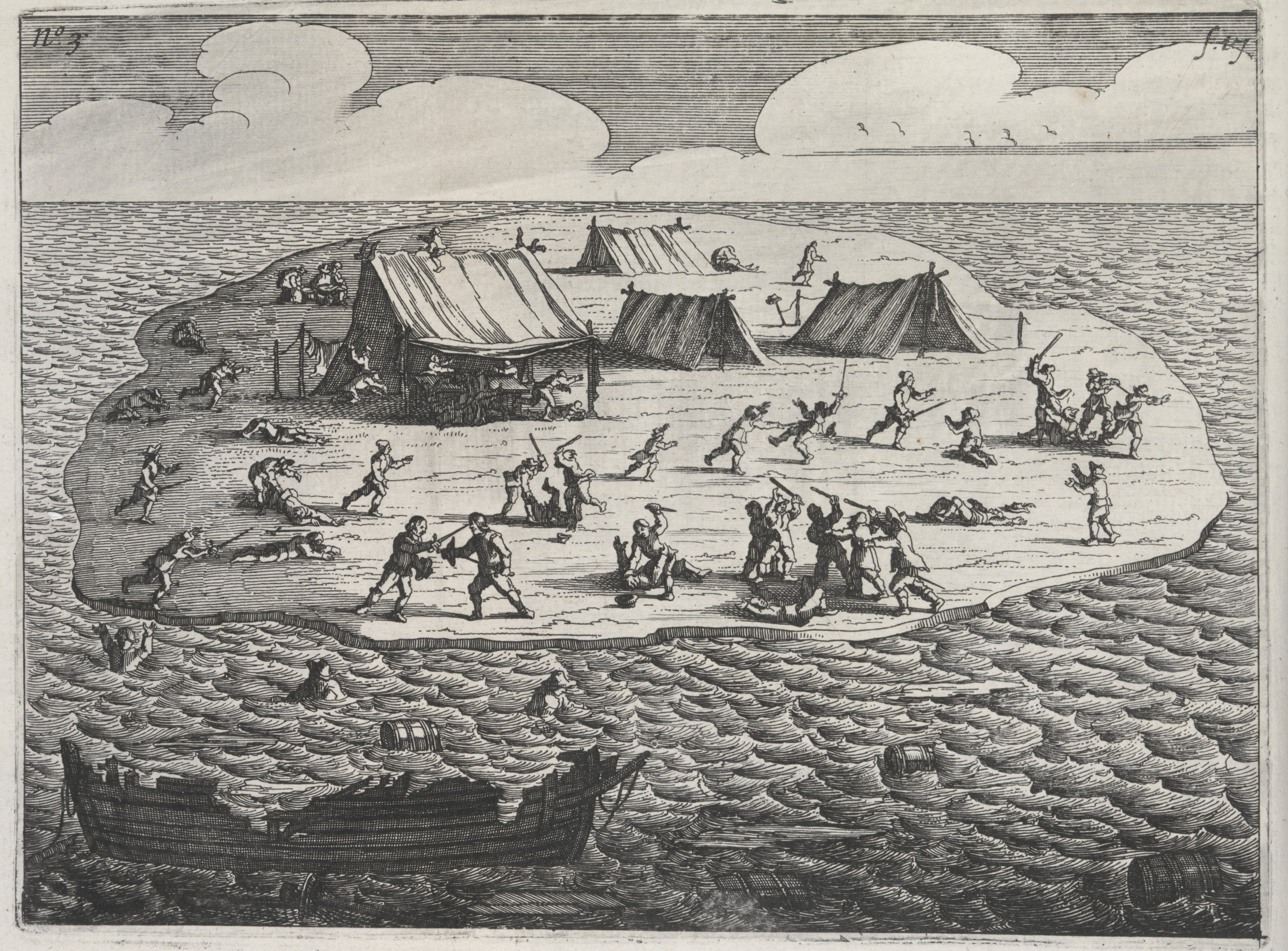
Massacre of the survivors

Cornelisz was one of the few men who stayed on Batavia to pillage and steal. He was one of the few who survived the final break-up of the ship and made it to Beacon Island after floating for two days. Though neither sailor nor soldier, Cornelisz was elected to be in charge of the survivors due to his senior rank in the Dutch East India Company. He made plans to hijack any rescue ship that might return and use the vessel to seek another safe haven. Cornelisz made far-fetched plans to start a new kingdom, using the gold and silver from the wreck. However, to carry out this plan, he first needed to eliminate possible opponents.

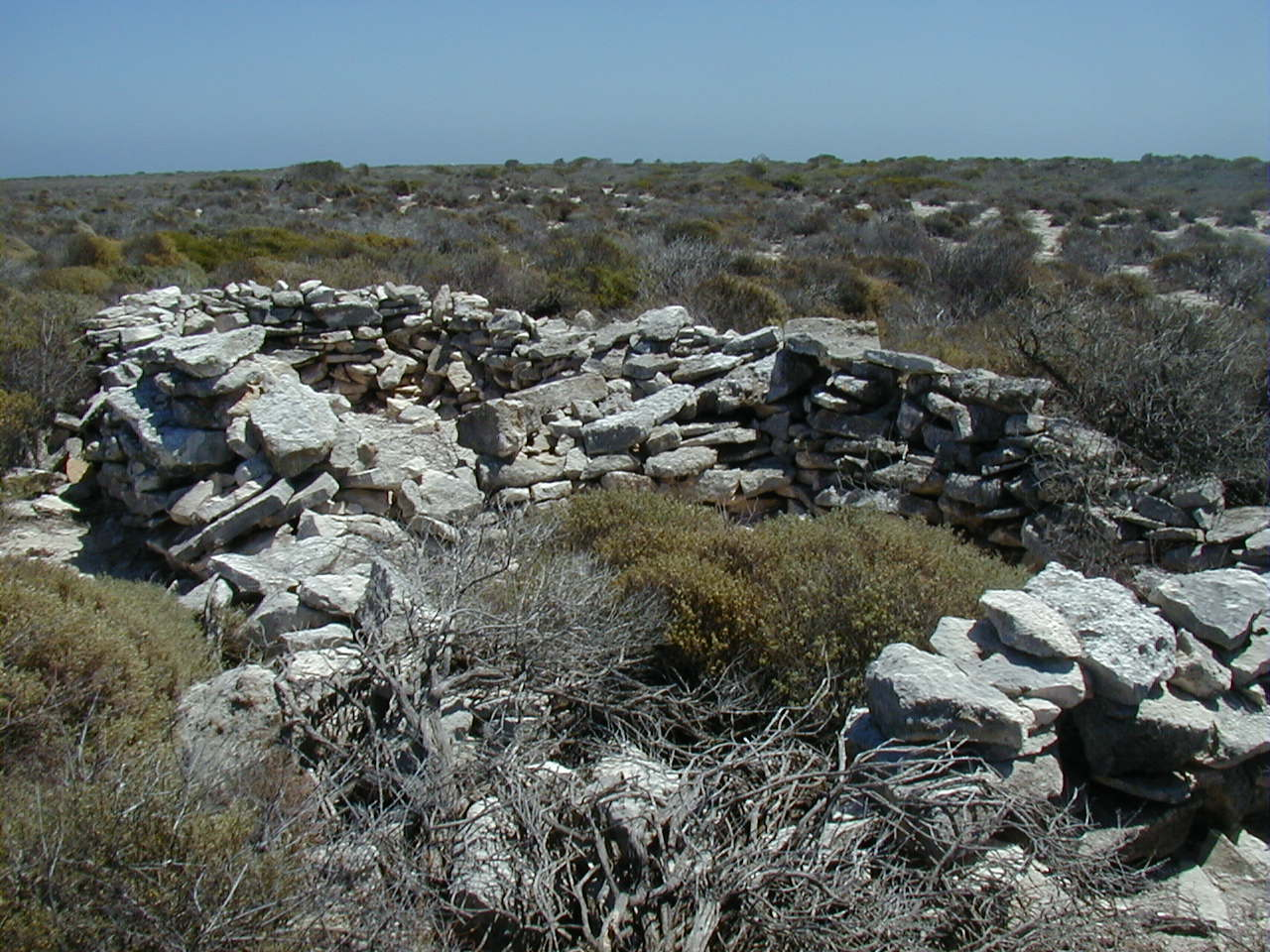
Wiebbe Hayes Stone Fort on West Wallabi Island

Cornelisz's first deliberate act was to have all weapons and food supplies commandeered and placed under his control. He then moved a group of soldiers, led by Wiebbe Hayes, to nearby West Wallabi Island (located roughly 8.7 kilometres or 5.4 miles to the northwest), under the pretence of having them search for water. They were told to send smoke signals when they found water and they would then be rescued. Convinced that they would be unsuccessful, he then left them there to die, taking complete control of the remaining survivors.

Cornelisz never committed any of the murders himself, although he tried and failed to poison a baby (who was eventually strangled). Instead, he coerced others into doing it for him, usually under the pretense that the victim had committed a crime such as theft. Cornelisz and his henchmen had originally murdered to save themselves, but eventually they began to kill for pleasure or out of habit. Cornelisz planned to reduce the island's population to around 45 so that their supplies would last as long as possible. He also feared that many of the survivors remained loyal to the Dutch East India Company. In total, Cornelisz's followers murdered at least 110 men, women, and children. A small number of women were kept as sex slaves; among them was Jans, whom Cornelisz reserved for himself.

In 2025, Dutch academic and cultural psychologist Jaco Koehler argued that the "unlikely story about a mad heretic" which has been repeated for 400 years may be wrong. He proposed an alternative theory that rather than a dastardly plot, ordinary men were driven to terrible acts by starvation.

=== Rescue ===
Although Cornelisz had left the soldiers, led by Hayes, to die, they had in fact found good sources of water and food on West Wallabi Island. Initially, they were unaware of the massacres taking place and sent pre-arranged smoke signals announcing their finds. However, they soon learned of the killings from survivors fleeing Beacon Island. In response, the soldiers devised makeshift weapons from materials washed up from the wreck. They also set a watch so that they were ready for Cornelisz's men, and built a small fort out of limestone and coral blocks.

Cornelisz seized on the news of water on the other island, as his own supply was dwindling and the continued survival of the soldiers threatened his own success. He was fearful that any rescue vessel would sight the soldiers first, therefore dispatched his men to eliminate this threat. But the trained soldiers were by now much better fed than Cornelisz' group and easily defeated them in several battles. Seeking to bring Hayes under his command he traveled to the island himself, whereupon Hayes and his soldiers took Cornelisz hostage. The men who escaped regrouped under soldier Wouter Loos and tried again, this time employing muskets to besiege Hayes' fort and almost defeating the soldiers. However, Hayes' men prevailed again just as Sardam arrived. A race to the rescue ship ensued between Cornelisz' men and the soldiers. Hayes reached the ship first and was able to present his side of the story to Pelsaert. After a short battle, the combined force captured all of Cornelisz's group.

=== Aftermath ===
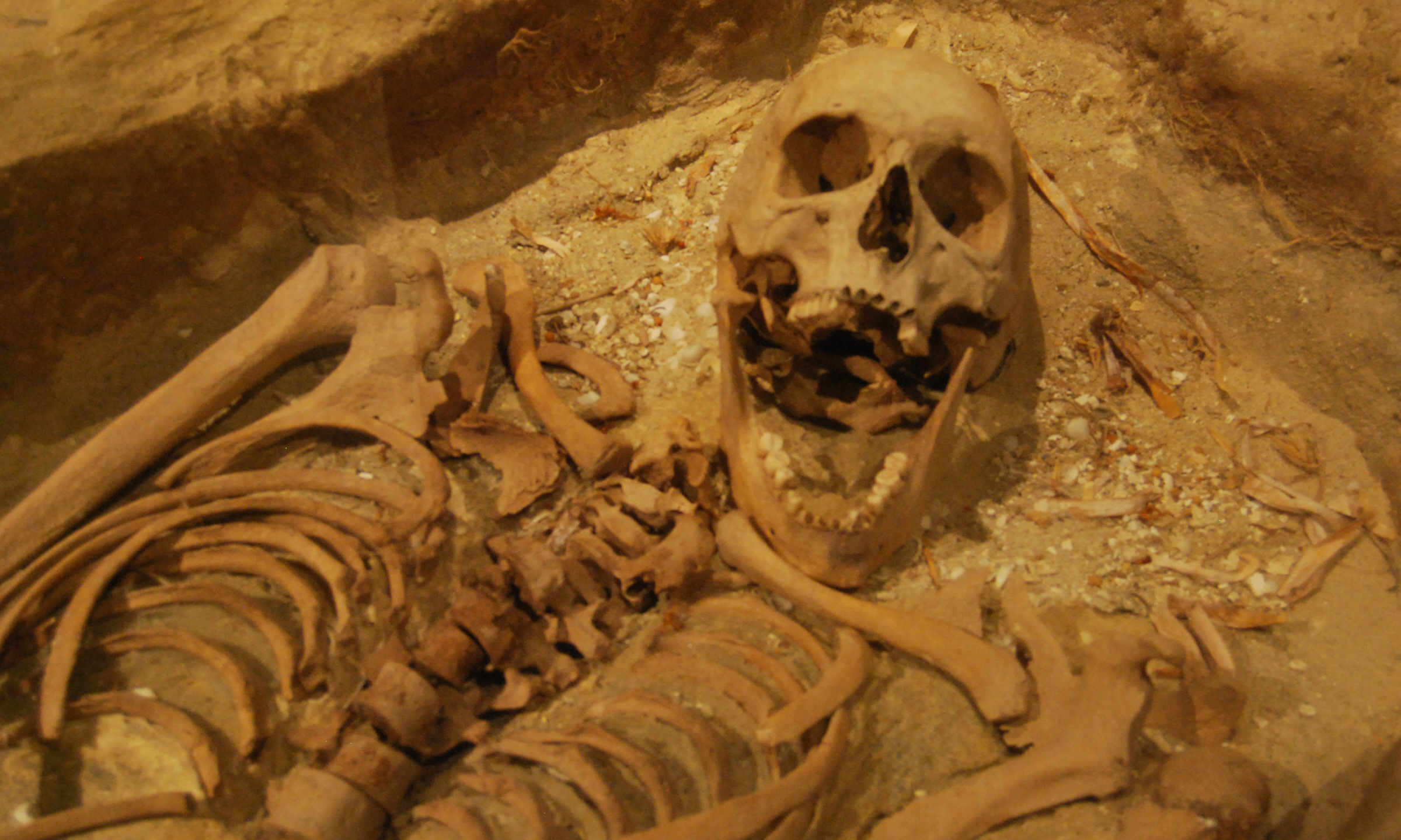
One of the Batavia massacre victims, excavated on Beacon Island and now displayed at Fremantle Shipwreck Museum. Male, aged about 35–39, with a gashed skull, broken shoulder blade and a missing right foot.

Pelsaert decided to conduct a trial on the islands, because Sardam on the return voyage to Batavia would have been overcrowded with both survivors and prisoners. After a brief trial, the worst offenders were taken to Seal Island and executed. Cornelisz and several of his henchmen had both hands chopped off before being hanged.

Loos and a cabin boy, Jan Pelgrom de Bye, who were considered only minor offenders, were marooned on mainland Australia, and were never heard of again. This made them the first Europeans to have permanently lived on the Australian continent. This location is now thought to be Wittecarra Creek near Kalbarri, Western Australia, though another suggestion is nearby Port Gregory.

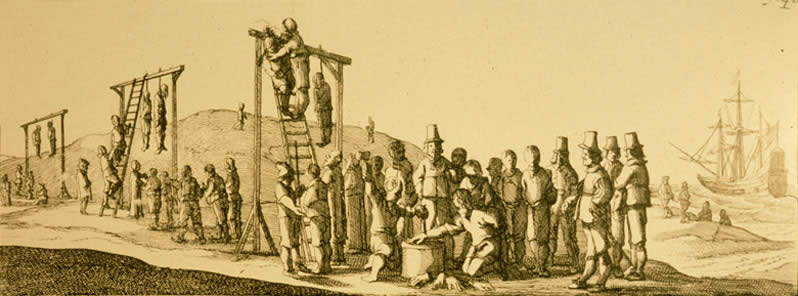
The hangings of the Batavia murderers

The rest of Cornelisz' henchmen were taken to Batavia for trial. Five were hanged, while several others were flogged, keelhauled or dropped from the yardarm on the later voyage back home. Cornelisz' second in command, Jacop Pietersz, was broken on the wheel, the most severe punishment available at the time. Jacobsz, despite being tortured, did not confess to his part in plotting the mutiny and escaped execution due to lack of evidence. What finally became of him is unknown; he might have died in prison in Batavia. A board of inquiry decided that Pelsaert had exercised a lack of authority and was therefore partly responsible for what had happened. His financial assets were seized, and he died within a year of disease. His journals on the matter would be published in 1647 and widely read, spreading knowledge of the dangers of the coast of Western Australia.

Hayes was hailed a hero and promoted to sergeant, which increased his salary, while those who had been under his command were promoted to the rank of corporal. Of the original 332 people on board Batavia, only 122 made it to the port of Batavia. Sardam eventually sailed home with most of the treasure previously carried on Batavia. Of the twelve treasure chests that were originally on board, ten were recovered and taken aboard Sardam.

== Archaeology ==
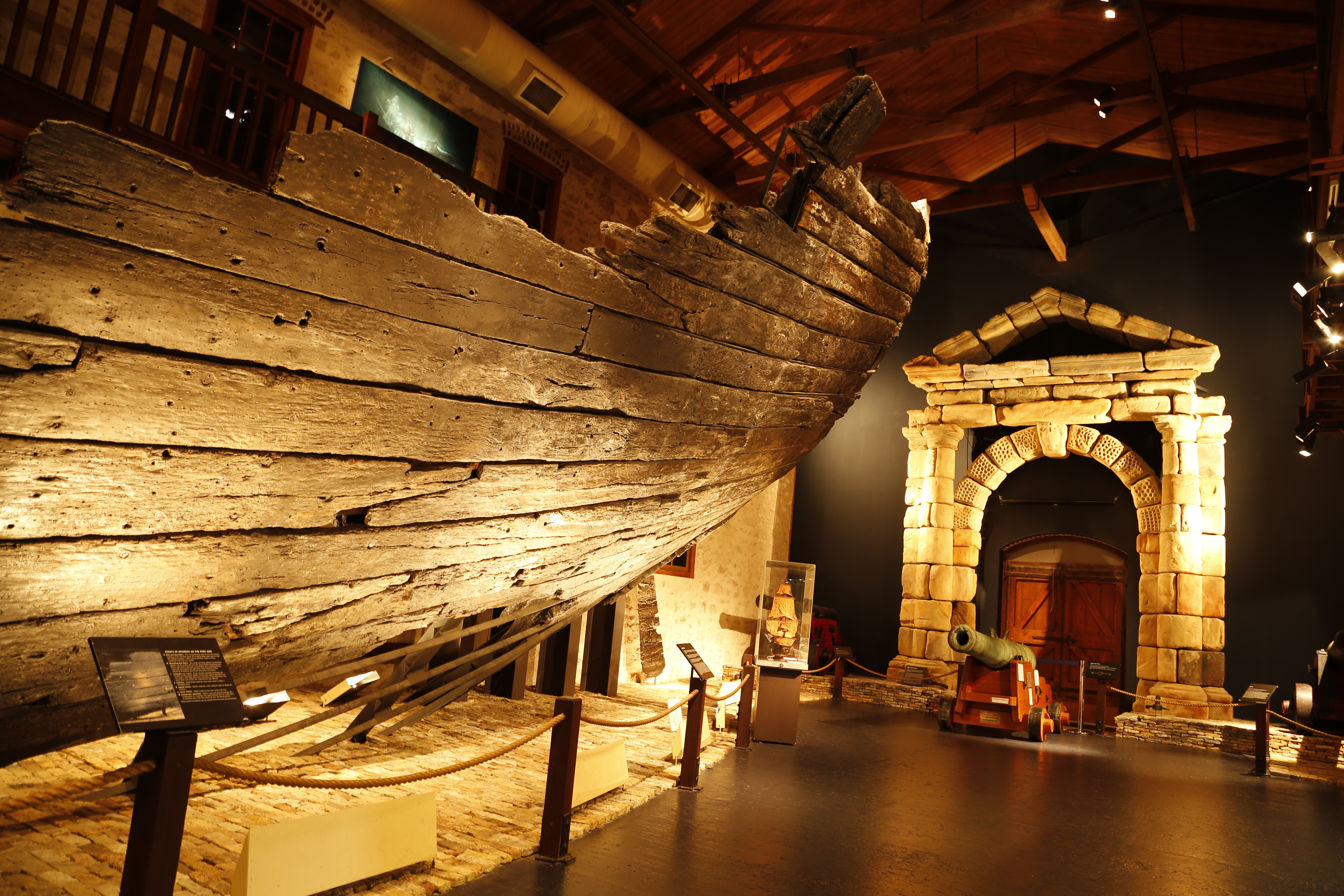
The stern section of the Batavia hull and reconstructed gateway, both housed in the Shipwreck Galleries in Fremantle, Western Australia.

Surveying the north-west coast of the Abrolhos Islands for the British Admiralty in April 1840, Captain John Lort Stokes reported that "the beams of a large vessel were discovered", assumed to be Zeewijk, "on the south west point of an island", reminding them that since Zeewijk's crew "reported having seen a wreck of a ship on this part, there is little doubt that the remains were those of the Batavia".

In the 1950s, historian Henrietta Drake-Brockman argued, from extensive archival research, that the Batavia wreck must lie in the Wallabi group of islands. The wreck was first sighted in 1963 by lobster fisherman David Johnson.

A systematic archaeological investigation was carried out in the 1970s. Most of the excavation work was carried out over four years, starting in 1972, with an initial survey in 1971. A large amount of the surviving hull was raised and conserved. This is about 20 tonnes (45,000 lb) of timber, which is about 3.5% of the original ship's hull. Other large items included port-side stern timbers, cannons, and an anchor. A large selection of smaller items were excavated, with many pottery containers, weapons, cooking equipment, and navigation items (including four astrolabes). Added to this were various trade items carried as part of the ship's cargo.

The excavation was carried out in challenging conditions, with the swell coming in from the Indian Ocean preventing diving on 173 days of the 447 days spent on site. Some of that diving was restricted to the inner wreck site, where material had been carried to an area sheltered from the swell inside the reef. In the fourth season on site (starting September 1975) only 10 days of diving were possible on the more exposed main wreck site.

To facilitate the monitoring and any future treatment, the hull timbers were erected on a steel frame. Its design—and that of a stone arch, also recovered—was such that individual components could be easily removed.

In 1972, the Dutch government transferred rights to Dutch shipwrecks in Australian waters to the Australian government. Excavated items are on display at the Western Australian Museum's various locations, though the majority of cannons and anchors have been left in situ. The wreck remains one of the premier diving sites on the Western Australian coast.

In 2015 archaeological researchers from the University of Western Australia unearthed several skeletons on Beacon Island, believed to be from Batavia. It was later reported that subsequent research over five years by an international research team of anthropologists and archaeologists had "discovered the remains of 12 victims, interred in both individual and mass graves, as well as evidence of a fierce struggle between survivors and a group of mutineers."

=== Bullion and jewels ===
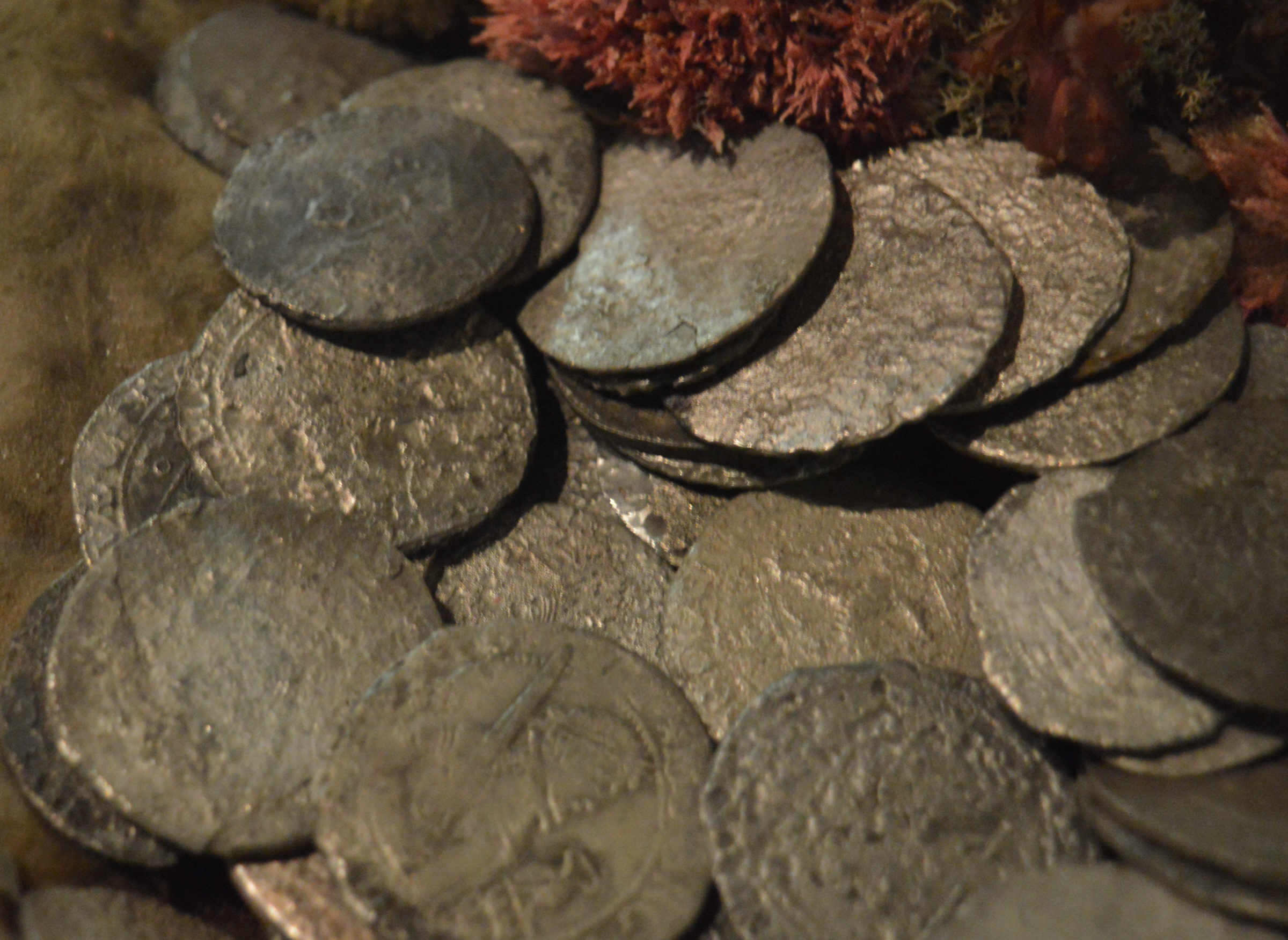
Rijksdaalder silver coins recovered from the wreck site

Batavia carried a considerable amount of silver coins, manufactured silver items, and jewels. The manufactured silverware were trade goods that Pelsaert had specifically requested to use in improving the VOC's trading capability – he had found that these were sought after by the "great men" he had dealt with in Agra. Though Pelsaert's divers recovered some of the silverware in his salvage operations, a large quantity still remained to be recovered in the archaeolocial investigation. As well as more usual tableware, the silver finds included parts of bedsteads.

Each ship in the Batavia class carried an estimated 250,000 guilders in twelve wooden chests, each containing about 8,000 silver coins. This money was intended for the purchase of spices and other commodities in Java. The bulk of these coins were silver rijksdaalder produced by the individual Dutch states, with the remainder being mostly made up of similar coins produced by German cities such as Hamburg.

Pelsaert was instructed to recover as much of the money as possible on his return to the Abrolhos Islands, using divers "to try if it is possible to salvage all the money [and] the casket of jewels that before your departure was already saved on the small island". Recovery of the money was far from easy. Pelsaert reported difficulties in pulling up heavy chests, e.g. 27 October 1629, when a chest had to be marked with a buoy for later recovery. On 9 November, he recorded sending four money chests to Sardam, and three the next day, but then abandoned further recovery work. By 13 November, Pelsaert recorded that ten money chests had been recovered—about 80,000 coins—leaving two lost since there had been twelve loaded originally. One was jammed under a cannon, and the other one had been broken open by Cornelisz' men.

Batavia's cargo also included special items being carried by Pelsaert for sale to the Mughal Court in India where he had intended to travel afterwards. There were four jewel bags, stated to be worth about 60,000 guilders, and an early-fourth-century Roman cameo, as well as numerous other items either now displayed in Fremantle and Geraldton, Western Australia, or recovered by Pelsaert.

== Replica ==
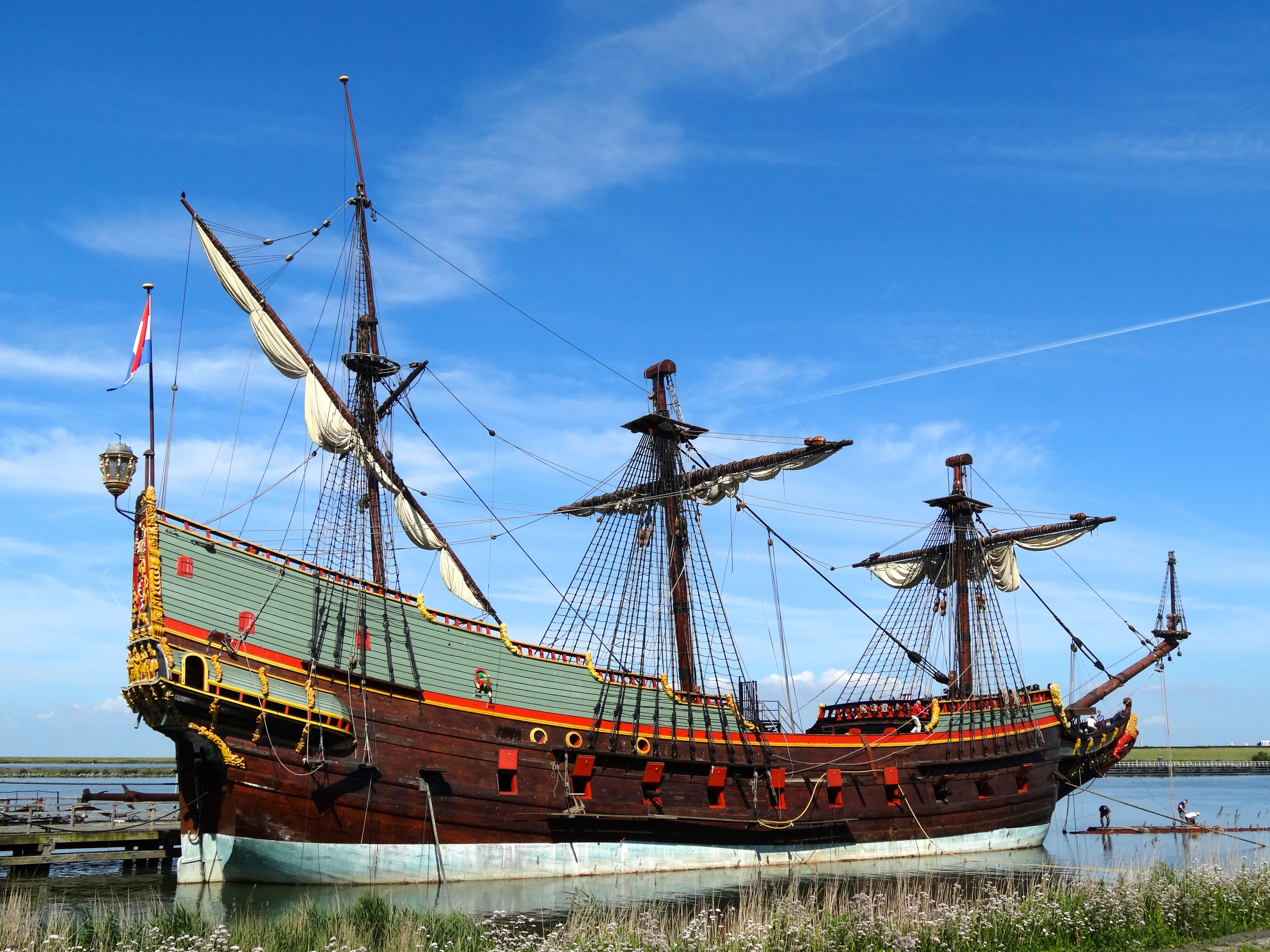
Replica of the Batavia

A Batavia ship replica was built from 1985 to 1995, using the same materials and methods utilized in the early 17th century. Her design was based on contemporary accounts, recovered wreckage, and other contemporary ships such as Vasa. After a number of commemorative voyages, the vessel is now moored as a museum ship in Lelystad in the Netherlands. The 40th anniversary of the project was celebrated in October 2025.

== Media ==
=== Non-fiction ===
Henrietta Drake-Brockman's book Voyage to Disaster (1963) was largely a biography of the Batavia's captain Francisco Pelsaert.

The Batavia story was retold in the book Islands of Angry Ghosts (1966) by Australian journalist and writer Hugh Edwards. It described the wreck and aftermath, and then followed with the story of the discovery and recovery.

In 2001 the Welsh author Mike Dash published his book, Batavia's Graveyard: The True Story of the Mad Heretic Who Led History's Bloodiest Mutiny, a historiographic account of the events and people aboard the Batavia.

Simon Leys' book The Wreck of the Batavia was published in 2005, and includes "a concise and pungently written summary of those terrible events."

In 2011, the Australian author, journalist, and TV presenter Peter FitzSimons released his book Batavia. Betrayal, Shipwreck, Murder, Sexual Slavery, Courage: a Spine-chilling Chapter in Australian History, discussing the events in detail. He describes the story of the Batavia as a 17th-century "Adults Only version of Lord of the Flies meets Nightmare on Elm Street."

=== Fiction ===
The Australian journalist and novelist Henrietta Drake-Brockman's last novel, The Wicked and the Fair (1957), centred on the voyage and shipwreck of the Batavia.

The Devil's Own by Deborah Lisson is a 1990 book for young adults that was short-listed for the Australian Children's Book of the Year Award and has been covered in some school curriculums. It tells the story of a 15-year-old girl who finds herself in the past in the Batavia's story of shipwreck, mutiny and murder.

Gary Crew won the 1991 Children's Book of the Year Award for Older Readers and the 1991 Victorian Premier's Literary Award for his novel Strange Objects (1990). It takes the premise that survivors from the Batavia made it to the mainland, and lived with the Aboriginal people of the area.

Arabella Edge's debut novel, The Company: The Story of a Murderer (2000) provided a fictionalised account of the wreck of the ship and of the aftermath. Lucretia's Batavia Diary (2016) by Australian author Howard Gray presents a fictional diary of what it was like to live through the Batavia story through the eyes of one of the passengers, Lucretia van der Mijlen.

The voyage, shipwreck, and subsequent events are also the subject of David Mark's 2022 novel Anatomy of a Heretic, as well as the 2022 novel The Night Ship by Jess Kidd, and the 2025 historical novel Daughters of Batavia by Stefanie Koens, which won the Banjo Prize from HarperCollins.

=== Film ===
In 1973, Bruce Beresford produced a film about the ship called The Wreck of the Batavia. Another documentary film, The Batavia – Wreck, Mutiny and Murder, was aired on the Nine Network in 1995.

It was reported in 2016 that Russell Crowe's production company purchased an option to turn Hugh Edwards 1966 novel Islands of Angry Ghosts into a film.

In 2017, a 60 Minutes report detailed the archaeological recovery of the skeletal remains of some of the victims. The documentary Batavia Revealed: Shipwreck Psycho was aired on SBS in 2018.

=== Television ===
In a 2023 interview, the developer of the reality TV show The Traitors, Jasper Hoogendoorn, stated that the original concept of the show was strongly influenced by the story of the Batavia.

=== Podcasts ===
Podcasts which have covered the incident in depth include:

- The Dollop (September 2015)
- Casefile True Crime Podcast (February 2020)
- Omnibus by Ken Jennings and John Roderick (October 2022)
- Last Podcast on the Left (four episodes in January and February 2025)
- After Dark: Myths, Misdeeds and the Paranormal by Anthony Delaney and Maddy Pelling (August 2025)
- Shipwreck That Turned Into a Nightmare Cult (2026) by Acceptable Losses Podcast featuring Adeptus Ridiculous

=== Music ===
The Dutch music ensemble Flairck based their 1996 album De Gouden Eeuw, and a subsequent tour and stage performances, on the unfortunate voyage of the Batavia.

The extreme metal band Deströyer 666 wrote a song about the mutiny, "Batavia's Graveyard", which is featured on their album Never Surrender.

== See also ==
- List of massacres in Australia
- Shipwrecks of Western Australia

== Bibliography ==
- Ariese, Csilla (2012). Databases of the people aboard the VOC ships Batavia (1629) & Zeewijk (1725) : an analysis of the potential for finding the Dutch castaways' human remains in Australia. Australian National Centre of Excellence for Maritime Archaeology. Fremantle, W.A.: Australian National Centre of Excellence for Maritime Archaeology. ISBN 9781876465070. OCLC 811789103.
- Dash, Mike (2002). Batavia's Graveyard – The True Story of the Mad Heretic Who Led History's Bloodiest Mutiny. London: Weidenfeld & Nicolson. ISBN 9780575070240. OCLC 49757935.
- Drake-Brockman, Henrietta (2006). Voyage to Disaster. Nedlands: University of Western Australia Press. ISBN 978-1-920694-72-2. OCLC 877705498.
- Edwards, Hugh (2000) [1966]. Island of Angry Ghosts: The Story of the Batavia. New York: HarperCollins. ISBN 9780732266066. OCLC 154645859.
- Godard, Philippe (1993). The First and Last Voyage of the Batavia. Phillida Stephens. Perth: Abrolhos Publishing. ISBN 9780646105192. OCLC 221163302.
- Green, Jeremy N. (1989). The loss of the Verenigde Oostindische Compagnie retourschip Batavia. British Archaeological Reports. Vol. 489. Oxford: BAR Publishing. ISBN 978-0-86054-627-6.
- Kimberly, Warren Bert, ed. (1897). History of West Australia: A Narrative of her Past together with Biographies of her Leading Men. Melbourne: F. W. Niven. OCLC 36942961. Wikidata Q5867187.
- "Islands of Angry Ghosts by Hugh Edwards". Kirkus Reviews. 1 July 1966.
- Leavesley, James H. (2003). "The 'Batavia', an apothecary, his mutiny and its vengeance" (PDF). Vesalius. IX (2): 22–24. Archived from the original (PDF) on 13 July 2019.
- Richards, Vicki (December 2002). "Cosmetic treatment of deacidified Batavia timbers". AICCM Bulletin. 27. Australian Institute for the Conservation of Cultural Material: 12–13. doi:10.1179/bac.2002.27.1.003. ISSN 1034-4233. S2CID 137577515.
- Souter, Corioli (2006), "Cultural Tourism and Diver Education", in Staniforth, Mark; Nash, Michael (eds.), Maritime Archaeology, The Springer Series in Underwater Archaeology, Springer US, pp. 163–176, doi:10.1007/0-387-26108-7_13, ISBN 978-0-387-25882-9
- Tivendale, James (28 May 2022). "REVIEW: Anatomy of a Heretic by David Mark". Grimdark Magazine.
- Van Duivenvoorde, Wendy (2015). Dutch East India Company shipbuilding : the archaeological study of Batavia and other seventeenth-century VOC ships (First ed.). College Station: Texas A&M University Press. ISBN 978-1-62349-231-1.
