= Batavia's Graveyard =

2001 book by Mike Dash

- First edition (UK)
- Author: Mike Dash
- Language: English
- Subject: History of the Netherlands
- Genre: Non-fiction
- Publisher: Weidenfeld & Nicolson (UK); Crown Publishers (US)
- Publication date: 2001
- Pages: 378
- ISBN: 9780609607664
- OCLC: 948685376
- Dewey Decimal: 919.41/3

Batavia's Graveyard: The True Story of the Mad Heretic Who Led History's Bloodiest Mutiny is a book released in 2001 by Welsh author Mike Dash about the Dutch East India Company ship Batavia, shipwrecked in 1629 on a small atoll of the Houtman Abrolhos, off the western shore of Australia.

== Description ==
The book retells the story of one of the largest mutinies in history, led by one of the ship's officers, Jeronimus Cornelisz, who oversaw the massacre of at least 110 people. The book explores the background of the period in history, and many of the people involved in the Dutch Republic. It casts a light on the tortuous trip from the Dutch Republic to the Dutch East Indies, and provides a detailed account of events after the captain and some of the crew's departure for Batavia in an open boat.

The final chapter highlights the survivors' fates and the rediscovery of the wreck.

== See also ==
- List of works about the Dutch East India Company
