= Marooning =

Intentional act of abandoning a sailor at sea

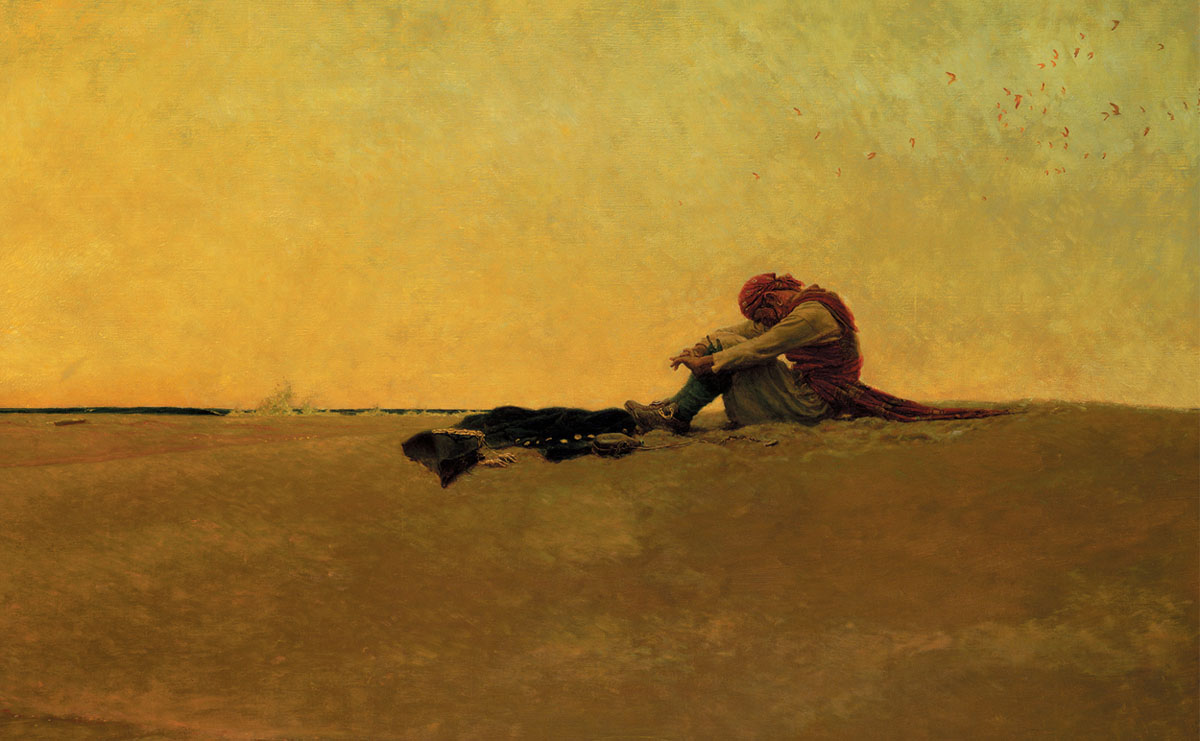
Marooned by Howard Pyle

Marooning is the intentional act of abandoning someone in an uninhabited area, such as a desert island. The word is attested in 1699, and is derived from the term maroon, a word for a fugitive slave, which could be a corruption of Spanish cimarrón (rendered as "symeron" in 16th–17th century English), meaning a household animal (or slave) who has "run wild". Cimarrón in turn may be derived from the Taíno word símaran (“wild”) (like a stray arrow), from símara (“arrow”).

The practice was a penalty for crewmen, or for captains at the hands of a crew in cases of mutiny. Generally, a marooned man was set on a deserted island, often no more than a sand bar at low tide. He would be given some food, a container of water, and a loaded pistol so he could die by suicide if he desired. The outcome of marooning was usually fatal, but survival was possible if the condemned could obtain a means of escape, as in the case of pirate Edward England, or the island on which the condemned was marooned had enough resources for long-term survival.

The chief practitioners of marooning were 17th and 18th century pirates, to such a degree that they were frequently referred to as "marooners". The pirate articles of captains Bartholomew Roberts and John Phillips specify marooning as a punishment for cheating one's fellow pirates or other offences. In this context, to be marooned is euphemistically to be "made governor of an island".

During the late 18th century in the southern United States, "marooning" took on a humorous additional meaning describing an extended camping-out picnic over a period of several days.

== Famous maroonings ==
- 1520: Juan de Cartagena and Pedro Sánchez de la Reina
- 1542: Marguerite de La Rocque, rescued in 1544 (two others died)
- 1566: Lope Martín and 26 other men, left on Ujelang Atoll after a failed mutiny
- 1629: Wouter Loos and Jan Pelgrom de Bye, from Batavia
- 1704: Alexander Selkirk, rescued in 1709, another source for Robinson Crusoe
- 1725: Leendert Hasenbosch, a Dutch sailor, was marooned on the deserted Ascension Island in 1725 as a punishment for sodomy. He is believed to have died there of thirst later that year. In 1726, his tent and diary were discovered by passing British sailors, and his diary was later translated and published in London.
- 1807: Robert Jeffery, rescued eight days later. Captain Warwick Lake of HMS Recruit marooned an impressed seaman, Robert Jeffery, on Sombrero island on 13 December 1807. Eight days later, a passing American vessel, the schooner Adams from Marblehead, Massachusetts, rescued him. A court martial later dismissed Lake from the Royal Navy.

== In literature ==
Probably the most famous literary reference to marooning occurs in Robert Louis Stevenson's Treasure Island in which Ben Gunn is left marooned on the island for three years.

A famous real-life marooning, initially at his own request, was that of the sailor Alexander Selkirk on Juan Fernández Island off the coast of Chile, in the Pacific Ocean. Selkirk, a sailor with the Dampier expedition, was worried about the unseaworthy condition of his ship, the Cinque Ports, and had argued with the captain until he left Selkirk ashore on the island where they had briefly stopped for water and food supplies. The Cinque Ports indeed later sank with the loss of most of her crew. Selkirk was not rescued until four years later, by Woodes Rogers. Selkirk's travails provided part of the inspiration for Daniel Defoe's novel Robinson Crusoe. Today there are islands off the Chilean coast named Alejandro Selkirk Island and Robinson Crusoe Island.

== In television ==
In 2012, Ed Stafford marooned himself on an uninhabited island off Fiji as an experiment for 60 days. He took with him no food, water, or equipment of any kind, except cameras to film the ordeal for Discovery Channel. Stafford completed the task and documents the psychological repercussions in his book Naked and Marooned.

== See also ==
- Castaway
- Exile
- Maroons
- Ostracism
- Walking the plank
