= Sardam (1628) =

Small vessel designed for trade in East Indies

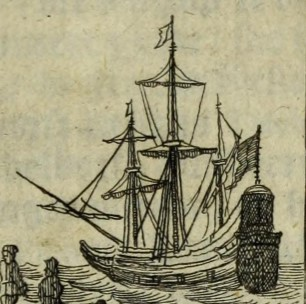
- The yacht Saerdam in 1629

History

Dutch Republic
- Namesake: Town of Zaandam
- Owner: Dutch East India Company
- Builder: Chamber of Amsterdam
- Completed: 1628
- Maiden voyage: 28 October 1628
- Out of service: ca. 1637

General characteristics
- Type: Yacht
- Tons burthen: 500
- Length: 36 m

The Zaandam, or Sardam, Saerdam and Saardam (alternative spellings of the old name of Zaandam), was a 17th-century yacht (Dutch: jacht) of the Dutch East India Company. It was a small merchant vessel designed primarily for the inter-island trade in the East Indies.

The ship sailed for Java in October 1628 as part of a flotilla commanded by commandeur Francisco Pelsaert, and arrived safely in Batavia on 7 July 1629.

In the meantime, the Batavia, flagship of the same flotilla, had been wrecked on a coral reef of the Houtman Abrolhos on 4 June. Pelsaert and 47 crew and passengers, including most higher officers, made their way with the ship's longboat towards Batavia and were picked up 3 July by the Frederik Hendrik, who sailed into Batavia on 7 July, the same day the Sardam arrived. Governor Jan Pietersz Coen ordered Pelsaert and his navigator to immediately return with the Sardam and 26 of its crew to the Australian coast to rescue survivors and salvage cargo. Sailing off on 15 July, the Sardam only arrived there on 17 September, due to weather, currents and a misestimate of the wreckage site. It took two months to deal with the aftermath of the notorious mutiny and recover the most valuable cargo. In October, the skipper and five crew members of the Sardam disappeared while searching for drifted cargo on more remote islands. Sardam sailed back on 15 November and arrived in Batavia on 5 December 1629 with most of the treasure, but with only 68 men, 7 women and 2 children of the original 250 people that had survived the shipwreck, as the rest had died or been murdered.

On one of her later trips, the Sardam sailed back and forth between Batavia and Fort Zeelandia (Taiwan) on Formosa between August 1631 and January 1632. The ship was active until 1636 or 1637.

== See also ==
- Jeronimus Cornelisz
- Wiebbe Hayes
