= Beacon Island (Houtman Abrolhos) =

Island in Western Australia

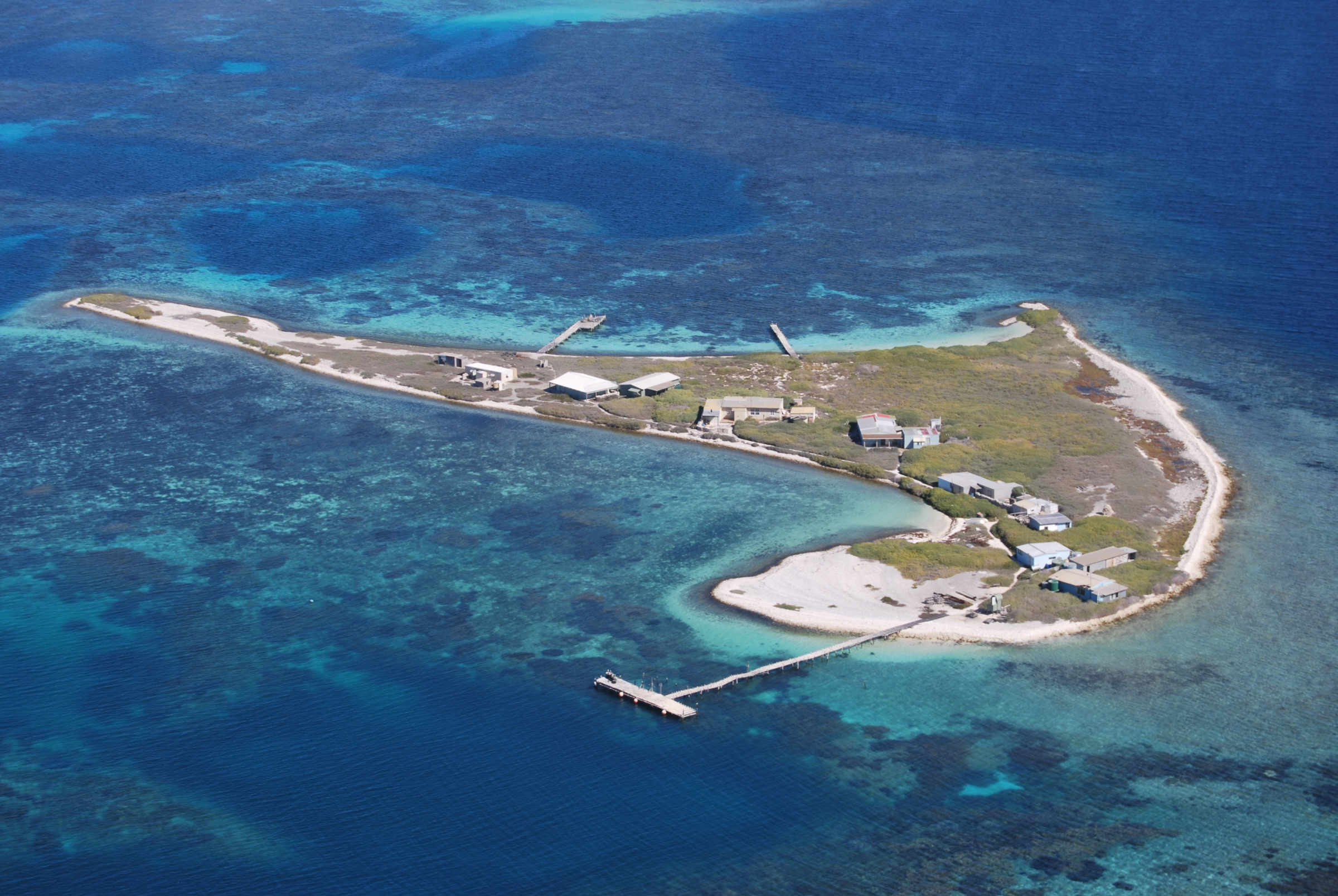
- Beacon Island prior to removal of structures

- Location within Australia Location within Indian Ocean

Geography
- Location: Indian Ocean, 80 km (50 mi); west off Western Australia
- Coordinates: 28°28′31″S 113°47′09″E
- Archipelago: Houtman Abrolhos
- Area: 5.25 ha (13.0 acres)
- Length: 350 m (1150 ft)
- Coastline: 1,050 m (3440 ft)
- Highest elevation: 2 m (7 ft)

Administration
- Australia
- State: Western Australia

Demographics
- Population: Uninhabited

Additional information
- Time zone: AWST (UTC+08:00)
- Site of Batavia massacre

Beacon Island, also known as Batavia's Graveyard, is an island on the eastern side of the Wallabi Group at the northern end of the Houtman Abrolhos, in the Indian Ocean, off the coast of Western Australia.

== Description ==
The J-shaped coral island has an area of 5.25 hectares (13.0 acres), length of approximately 350 metres (1,150 ft), with approximately 1.05 kilometres (0.65 mi) of shoreline. (Note: Measurements taken from Google Earth on 20 April 2019.) The island has a low elevation, mostly less than two metres (6 ft 7 in), and is part of the Morning Reef complex composed of coral shingle. The surface is mostly sandy but has some pockets of guano and some exposed coral.

== History ==
The island is best known as the location of the Batavia wreck, mutiny and massacre. Batavia was wrecked on Morning Reef in June 1629. Most of the 316 passengers and crew of the Dutch East India Company ship were washed ashore on the smaller islands on the eastern side of the Wallabi Group. The commander, Francisco Pelsaert, and 47 other crew and passengers set off in one the longboats in search of water but ended up sailing to Indonesia.

When Pelsaert returned to the Abrolhos, he found that Batavia's under-merchant, Jeronimus Cornelisz, had recruited other men from the survivors and then killed 125 of the other survivors. The mutineers camped on Beacon Island, and many of the victims were buried there.

The island, along with the rest of the Abrolhos, was likely visited by sealers and guano miners through the 19th century. In 1877, survivors of the Hadda shipwreck lived on the island for five days. Crayfisherman arrived on the island sometime afterward and established several galvanised iron and asbestos shacks along with sheds for gear on four main sites. The first archaeological excavations were conducted in the 1960s and 1970s, with the Western Australian Museum conducting excavations in 1992.

In 2014, buildings and structures were removed from the island to restore it to a state of wilderness as part of an effort to protect Batavia heritage.

The island is on the National Heritage list due to its being the site of the Batavia shipwreck.

== Birds ==
The island is part of the Houtman Abrolhos Important Bird Area, identified as such by BirdLife International because it supports large numbers of breeding seabirds. Birds that are found on the island include the wedge-tailed shearwater, which nests on the island between November and May.
