= Mike Dash =

Welsh writer and historian

- Education: University of Cambridge; King's College London (PhD)
- Occupations: Writer, historian and researcher

Mike Dash is a Welsh writer, historian, and researcher. He has written books and articles about dramatic episodes in history.

== Biography ==
Dash was born in London. He attended Peterhouse, Cambridge, a college particularly noted for teaching history, and completed postgraduate work at King's College London, where he obtained a Ph.D.

Dash authored a series of books covering incidents in the history of the Dutch East India Company, the Netherlands, India under British rule, and New York during the Progressive Era. Each focuses on a single event or series of events, among them the wreck of the East Indiaman Batavia, the Dutch tulip mania of 1634–1637, and the early years of the American Mafia. He has written for a history blog, "Past Imperfect", published by Smithsonian Magazine. In 2014, his blog post on the Lykov family, "Lost in the Taiga," was named one of "Nearly 100 Fantastic Pieces of Journalism" by The Atlantic.

Dash's 2009 book, The First Family, is a new history of Giuseppe Morello and the establishment of the Mafia in the United States. He began writing for the Smithsonian in July 2011 when the Institution acquired his history site, "A Blast from the Past", shortly after the History News Network awarded it the 2010 Cliopatria prize for history blogging. In addition to blogging, Dash regularly contributes to r/AskHistorians, and since January 2019 he has republished material written for AskHistorians on his personal blog's "Ask Mike" page.

== Bibliography ==
- The Limit: Engineering at the Boundaries of Science. BBC, 1995. ISBN 0-563-37117-X.
- Borderlands: The Ultimate Exploration of the Unknown. Dell, 1997. ISBN 0-440-23656-8.
- Tulipomania: The Story of the World's Most Coveted Flower & the Extraordinary Passions It Aroused. Crown, 2000. ISBN 0-609-60439-2.
- Batavia's Graveyard: The True Story of the Mad Heretic Who Led History's Bloodiest Mutiny. Weidenfeld & Nicolson, 2002. ISBN 0-575-07024-2.
- Thug: The True Story of India's Murderous Cult. Granta Books, 2005. ISBN 1-86207-604-9.
- Satan's Circus: Murder, Vice, Police Corruption, and New York's Trial of the Century. Crown Publishing, 2007. ISBN 978-0-307-39522-1.
- The First Family: Terror, Extortion and the Birth of the American Mafia. Simon & Schuster, 2009. ISBN 978-1-84737-173-7.
