= Henrietta Drake-Brockman =

Australian novelist and playwright

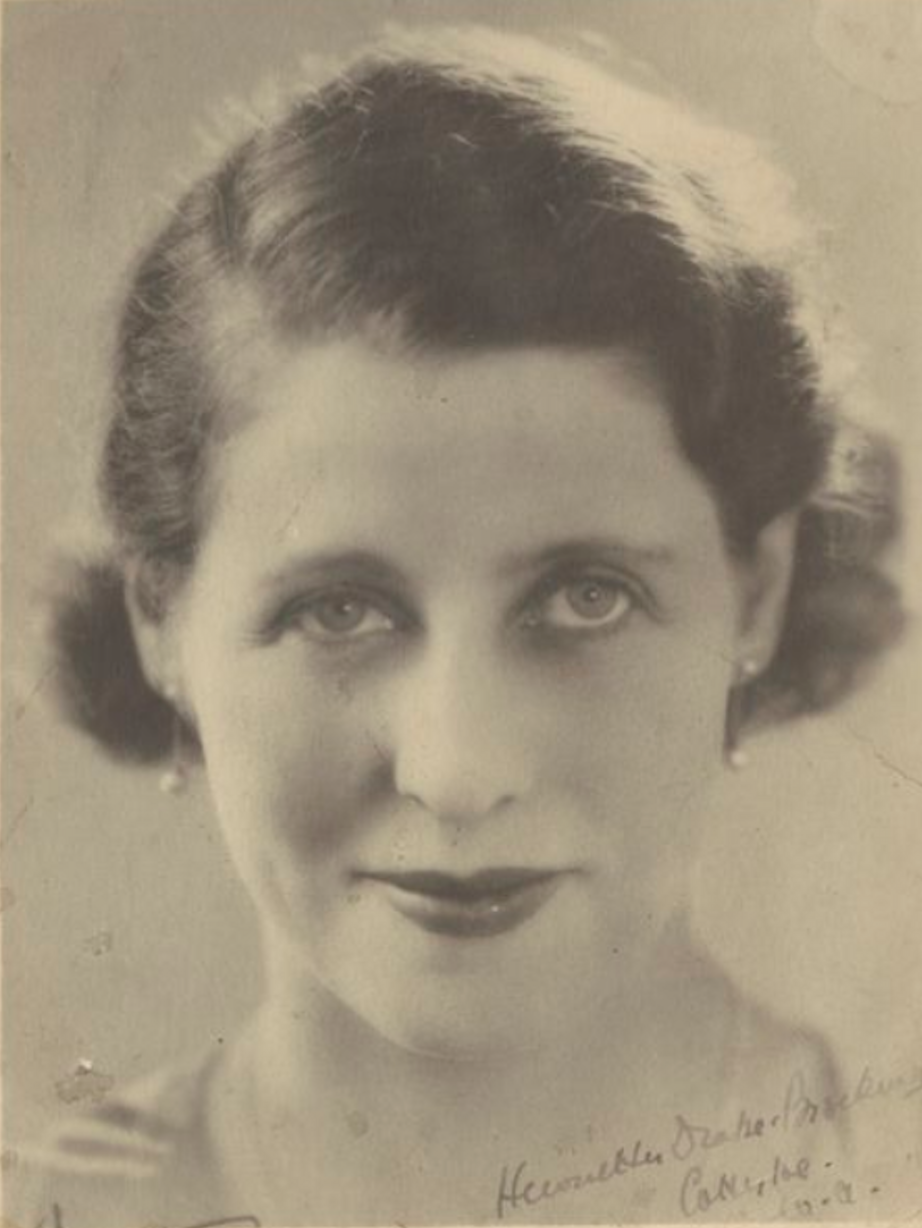
- Drake-Brockman in 1944
- Born: 27 July 1901
- Died: 8 March 1968 (aged 66)
- Education: University of Western Australia

Henrietta Drake-Brockman (27 July 1901 – 8 March 1968) OBE was an Australian journalist and novelist.

== Early life ==
Henrietta Frances York Jull was born in Perth, Western Australia in 1901 to public service commissioner Martin Edward Jull (1862–1917), formerly of the Department of Works, and his wife Roberta (née Stewart), a medical doctor and social reformer. She was educated in Scotland, her mother's homeland, and at Frensham school for girls in Mittagong. She studied literature at the University of Western Australia and art in Henri Van Raalte's Perth studio. She married Geoffrey Drake-Brockman, then Commissioner for north western Australia, in 1921.

== Writing career ==
Both Henrietta and her husband wrote about their travels in articles for The West Australian. The travels were also sources for her novels. By the time the couple returned to Perth in 1926, Henrietta's reputation as a writer had become established. From her experiences of the North-West, she had written sketches and stories, and in the early 1930s published a serial, The Disquieting Sex. Blue North, an historical novel about life in the 1870s, was serialised in The Bulletin and published in 1934, while Sheba Lane used contemporary Broome as its setting. Younger Sons was a carefully documented novel of Western Australian settlement and The Fatal Days (1947) focussed on Ballarat, Victoria, during World War II. Her last novel, The Wicked and The Fair (1957), centred on the voyage of the Batavia in 1629. Her final book, Voyage To Disaster (1963), was largely a biography of the Batavia's captain Francisco Pelsaert. Her extensive research entailed the use of material from Dutch archives and of E. D. Drok's translations of Pelsaert's journals, as well as trips by sea and air to the probable site of the wreck. Amongst the many articles she wrote during the 1940s and 1950s for Walkabout, in January 1955, Henrietta diverged from general opinion and closely estimated the Batavia's correct resting place. Eight years later, in 1963 she became one of the four acknowledged co-discoverers of the Batavia wreck. She used an aqualung to inspect the wreck of the vessel off the Abrolhos Islands. The anchor farthest on the reef was named Henrietta's Anchor. Nowadays it is still there in 3.5 metres (11 ft 6 in) depth.

Drake-Brockman edited and selected some Aboriginal tales, those collected and translated by K. Langloh Parker, for a new edition of Australian Legendary Tales in 1953. The illustrations were provided by Elizabeth Durack. This edition was chosen by the Children's Book Council of Australia as "Book of the Year" for 1954. She was also co-editor with Walter Murdoch of Australian Short Stories.

== Playwriting career ==
Drake-Brockman also wrote for the theatre in Perth during the 1930s and '40s. Claiming that she would rather have been a playwright than a novelist, and that there were almost no opportunities for Australian plays when she had begun to write, Henrietta did manage to have some of her plays staged. The Man from the Bush was produced in Perth in 1932 (and later in Melbourne), Dampier's Ghost was performed in 1934 and The Blister in 1937. In her best-known play, Men Without Wives, she extended her work beyond the one-act genre and won a sesquicentenary drama prize in 1938. Men Without Wives and Other Plays was published in 1955. Her plays, for the most part, depicted the people and isolated places of her earlier fiction. She admired and wrote on the work of Katharine Susannah Prichard.

== Later life ==
Drake-Brockman joined the Sydney branch of the Fellowship of Australian Writers in 1939. She was one of the founders of the West Australian Branch, being the president in 1941 and also 1956–1957. She edited several collections of short stories and her own were compiled in Sydney or the Bush. She received an O.B.E in 1967, one year before her death in 1968.

== Bibliography ==
=== Novels ===
- Drake-Brockman, Henrietta (c. 1930). The Disquieting Sex. Sydney: Consolidated Press.
- —— (1934). Blue North. Sydney: The Endeavour Press.
- —— (1936). Sheba Lane. Sydney: Angus & Robertson.
- —— (1937). Younger Sons. Sydney: Angus & Robertson.
- —— (1947). The Fatal Days. Sydney: Angus & Robertson.
- —— (1957). The Wicked and the Fair. Sydney: Angus & Robertson.
- ——; Pelsaert, Francisco; Drok, E. D. (1995) [1963]. Voyage to Disaster: The Life of Francisco Pelsaert (New ed.). University of Western Australia Press. ISBN 978-1-875560-32-5.

=== Short stories ===
- Drake-Brockman, Henrietta (1948). Sydney or the Bush. Angus & Robertson, Sydney.

=== Essays ===
- Drake-Brockman, Henrietta (1967). Katharine Susannah Prichard (Australian writers and their work). Oxford University Press, Melbourne.

=== Plays ===
- Drake-Brockman, Henrietta (1955). Men Without Wives and Other Plays. Angus & Robertson, Sydney.
