= Francisco Pelsaert =

Dutch merchant

Francisco Pelsaert (c. 1595 – September 1630) was a merchant who worked for the Dutch East India Company (VOC), best known for his role as the commander of the Batavia. The ship ran aground in the Houtman Abrolhos, off the coastal regions of Western Australia in June 1629, which led to a massacre of the survivors orchestrated by Jeronimus Cornelisz.

== Background ==
Born in Antwerp, Pelsaert joined the Dutch East India Company (VOC) and sailed to India in 1618, where he was posted as a junior merchant, spending seven years in Agra during which time he became a senior merchant. After a brief return to the United Provinces in 1628, he departed for Java soon after in command of the Batavia.

== Batavia ==
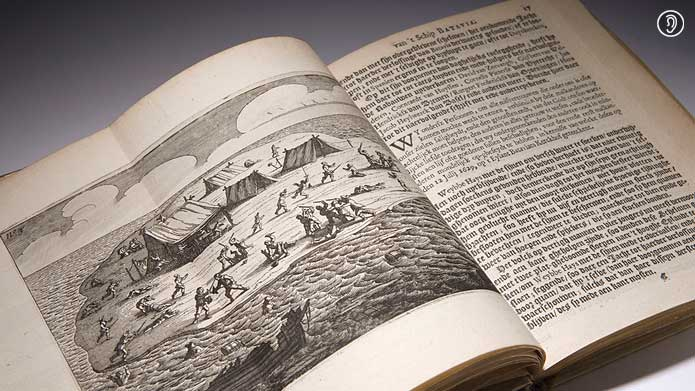
Ongeluckige voyagie van het schip Batavia, uytgevaren onder't beleydt van den E. François Pelsaert, 1648

During the voyage from the Texel to Java, a company official, Jeronimus Cornelisz, and the ship's skipper, Ariaen Jacobsz, had plotted but never attempted a mutiny against Pelsaert. Before this was possible, the ship had been wrecked. The wreck of the Batavia took place on Morning Reef, about 1.6 kilometres (1 mi) to the south of what is now known as Beacon Island. Of the 341 passengers and crew, about 40 drowned early on while trying to reach a small island, while the rest succeeded in getting ashore. After a brief search of the island and several nearby islands, the commander realized that the islands held no natural water source, and eventually decided to head for Batavia to get help. He left with the ship's longboat and a party of 48 officers and passengers, including one baby in arms. All survived the voyage.

Though neither sailor nor soldier, Cornelisz was the most senior VOC official left behind. After the departure of Pelsaert and Jacobsz, he assumed control of the survivors. Cornelisz and his men then began a reign of terror, murdering over 100 men, women, and children before they finally found resistance from a group of soldiers under the command of Wiebbe Hayes, who had been exiled to a neighbouring island. In October 1629, after a four-month absence, Pelsaert returned to the islands on the VOC's ship Sardam. Cornelisz had been captured weeks earlier by Hayes' men, and he and his followers were tried and most were executed. After several weeks spent salvaging the Batavia's goods, Pelsaert and the survivors returned to Java.

== Later life ==
Pelsaert's health had suffered from the hardships, but nevertheless he took part in an expedition to Sumatra. He died in September 1630, soon after his return to Batavia. He does not seem to have taken his seat in the High Government at Batavia, for which he had been selected as extraordinary member in 1629. Little of his life earnings were eventually passed to his elderly mother. He had no offspring, and no heirs for his fortune. In the end, the Dutch East India Company retained most of his earnings.

Pelsaert had secretly acquired a large sum of unauthorized goods and money before his death. These were discovered by the Dutch East India Company and confiscated.

== General references ==
- Pelsaert, Francisco (1629). van Huystee, Marit (ed.). The Batavia Journal of François Pelsaert (PDF) (Report). Report—Department of Maritime Archaeology, Western Australian Maritime Museum. Translated by van Huystee, Marit. Algemeen Rijksarchief (ARA), The Hague, Netherlands, Document 1630: 1098 QQII, fol.232–316. Fremantle, Western Australia (published 1994). Archived (PDF) from the original on 9 March 2020.
