= List of hydroids of the Houtman Abrolhos =

A total of 38 hydroid species have been collected at the Houtman Abrolhos. 34 of these are leptothecates, the remainder being anthoathecates. 35 of them (92%) attach to temperate algae; the remaining, the others to coral rock. This is a list of hydroids of the Houtman Abrolhos:

== Anthoathecatae ==
Corynidae

- Sarsia eximia

Candelabridae

- Candelabrum harrisoni

Eudendriidae

- Eudendrium ?minutum

Cytaeididae

- ?Perarella sp.

== Leptothecatae ==
Campanulariidae

- Campanularia delicata
- Orthopyxis gaussica
- Paracalix ambiplica
- Obelia sp.

Haleciidae

- Halecium delicatulum
- Halecium dyssymetrum
- Halecium pearsonense
- Halecium nanum
- Hydrodendron armatum
- Hydrodendron australe

Thyroscyphidae

- Thyroscyphus macrocytharus

Sertulariidae

- Salacia desmoides
- Amphisbetia minuta
- Dynamena quadridentata
- Sertularia turbinata
- Calamphora campanulata

Halopterididae

- Gattya trebilcocki
- Antennella secundaria
- Halopteris everta
- Halopteris diaphana

Kirchenpaueriidae

- Pycnotheca producta
- Kirchenpaueria sp.

Plumulariidae

- Monotheca obliqua
- Monotheca spinulosa
- Monotheca hyalina
- Dentitheca alata
- Plumularia setaceoides
- Plumularia filicaulis

Aglaopheniidae

- Aglaophenia pseudoplumosa
- Aglaophenia sp.
- Macrorhynchia filamentosa
- Macrorhynchia philippina
- Gymnangium furcatum
- Gymnangium gracilicaule
