= List of birds of the Houtman Abrolhos =

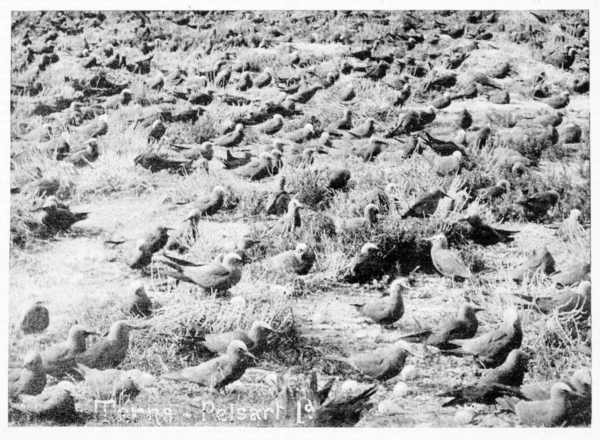
Terns, Pelsaert Island, 1895

The Houtman Abrolhos, an island chain off the coast of Western Australia, is one of the most important areas in the world for breeding colonies of seabirds. Around 90 species of seabird occur there, as well as three species of shore bird, and six species of land bird.

Common name	Scientific name	Family
Little penguin	Eudyptula minor novaehollandiae	Spheniscidae
Wandering albatross	Diomedea exulans	Diomedeidae
Grey-headed albatross	Diomedea chrysostyoma	Diomedeidae
Atlantic yellow-nosed albatross	Diomedea clororhychos	Diomedeidae
Southern giant petrel	Macronectes giganteus	Procellariidae
Cape petrel	Daption capense	Procellariidae
Great-winged petrel	Pterodroma macroptera macroptera	Procellariidae
White-headed petrel	Pterodroma lessonii	Procellariidae
Soft-plumaged petrel	Pterodroma mollis mollis	Procellariidae
Prion (bird)	Pachyptila spp.	Procellariidae
White-chinned petrel	Procellaria aequinoctialis	Procellariidae
Streaked shearwater	Calonectris leucomelaena	Procellariidae
Flesh-footed shearwater	Puffinus carneipes	Procellariidae
Wedge-tailed shearwater	Puffinus pacificus	Procellariidae
Little shearwater	Puffinus assimilis assimilis	Procellariidae
Wilson's storm petrel	Oceanites oceanicus	Hydrobatidae
White-faced storm petrel	Oceanites marinus dulciae	Hydrobatidae
Red-tailed tropicbird	Phaethon rubricaeuda	Phaethontidae
White-tailed tropicbird	Phaethon lepturus	Phaethontidae
Australian pelican	Pelicanus conspicillatus	Pelecanidae
Australasian gannet	Morus serrator	Sulidae
Great cormorant	Phalacrocorax carbo novaehollandiae	Phalacrocoracidae
Pied cormorant	Phalacrocorax varius	Phalacrocoracidae
Little pied cormorant	Microcarbo melanoleucos	Phalacrocoracidae
Australasian darter	Anthinga novaehollandiae	Phalacrocoracidae
White-faced heron	Ardea nobaehollandiae	Ardeidae
Eastern reef egret	Egretta sacra	Ardeidae
Black swan	Cygnus atratus	Anatidae
Australian shelduck	Tadorna tadornoides	Anatidae
Grey teal	Anas gibberifrons gracilis	Anatidae
White-bellied sea eagle	Haliaeetus leucogaster	Accipitridae
Osprey	Pandion haliaetus cristatus	Accipitridae
Nankeen kestrel	Falco cenchroides cenchroides	Falconidae
Stubble quail	Coturnix novaezelandiae pectoralis	Phasianidae
Abrolhos painted buttonquail	Turnix varius scintillans	Turnicidae
Buff-banded rail	Gallirallus philippensis mellori	Rallidae
Spotted crake	Porzana fluminea	Rallidae
Spotless crake	Porzana tabuensis	Rallidae
Pied oystercatcher	Haematopus longirostris	Haematopodidae
Sooty oystercatcher	Haematopus fuliginosus fuliginosus	Haematopodidae
Banded lapwing	Vanellus tricolor	Charadriidae
Grey plover	Pluvialis squatarola	Charadriidae
Pacific golden plover	Pluvialis fulva	Charadriidae
Hooded plover	Thinornis cucullatus	Charadriidae
Red-capped plover	Charadrius ruficapillus	Charadriidae
Greater sand plover	Charadrius leschenaultii	Charadriidae
Whimbrel	Numenius phaeopus variegatus	Scolopacidae
Eastern curlew	Numenius madagascariensis	Scolopacidae
Black-tailed godwit	Limosa limosa melanuroides	Scolopacidae
Bar-tailed godwit	Limosa lapponica baueri	Scolopacidae
Greenshank	Tringa nebularia	Scolopacidae
Terek sandpiper	Tringa terek	Scolopacidae
Common sandpiper	Tringa hypoleucos	Scolopacidae
Grey-tailed tattler	Tringa brevipes	Scolopacidae
Ruddy turnstone	Arenaria interpres interpres	Scolopacidae
Great knot	Calidris tenuirostris	Scolopacidae
Sanderling	Calidris alba	Scolopacidae
Red-necked stint	Calidris ruficollis	Scolopacidae
Sharp-tailed sandpiper	Calidris acuminata	Scolopacidae
Curlew sandpiper	Calidris ferruginea	Scolopacidae
Black-winged stilt	Himantopus himantopis leucocephalus	Recurvirostridae
Banded stilt	Cladorhynchus leucocephala	Recurvirostridae
Red-necked avocet	Recurvirostra novaehollandiae	Recurvirostridae
Oriental pratincole	Glareola maldivarum	Glareolidae
Great skua	Stercorarius skua lonnbergi	Laridae
Silver gull	Larus novaehollandiae novaehollandiae	Laridae
Pacific gull	Larus pacificus georgii	Laridae
Common noddy	Anous stolidus pileatus	Laridae
Lesser noddy	Anous tenuirostris melanops	Laridae
Caspian tern	Sterna caspia	Laridae
Crested tern	Sterna bergii	Laridae
Roseate tern	Sterna dougallii	Laridae
Bridled tern	Sterna anaethetus anaethetus	Laridae
Sooty tern	Sterna fuscata	Laridae
Little tern	Sterna sinensis	Laridae
Fairy tern	Sterna nereis nereis	Laridae
Brush bronzewing	Phaps elegans	Columbidae
Galah	Cacatua roseicapilla	Psittacidae
Little corella	Cacatua sanguinea	Psittacidae
Horsfield's bronze cuckoo	Chrysococcyx basalis	Cuculidae
Western barn owl	Tyto alba delicula	Strigidae
White-throated needletail	Hirundapus caudacutus	Apodidae
Sacred kingfisher	Halcyon sancta sancta	Alcedinidae
White-backed swallow	Cheramoeca leucosterna	Hirundinidae
Welcome swallow	Hirundo neoxena	Hirundinidae
Richard's pipit	Anthus novaeseelandiae australis	Motacillidae
Black-faced cuckoo-shrike	Coracina novaehollandiae	Campephagidae
Red-capped robin	Petroica goodenovii	Pachycephalidae
Rufous whistler	Pachycephala rufiventris rufiventris	Pachycephalidae
Willie wagtail	Rhipidura leucophrys leucophrys	Monarchidae
White-browed scrubwren	Sericornis frontalis balstoni	Acanthizidae
Little grassbird	Megalurus gramineus	Sylviidae
Rufous songlark	Cinclorhamphus mathewsi	Sylviidae
Brown songlark	Cincloramphus cruralis	Sylviidae
Silvereye	Zosterops lateralis gouldi	Zosteropidae
Australian raven	Corvus coronoides perplexus	Corvidae
