= List of reptiles of the Houtman Abrolhos =

The Houtman Abrolhos, an island chain off the coast of Western Australia, is recognised as containing 24 terrestrial reptile species, plus the marine green turtle (Chelonia mydas) which is often observed in large numbers near shore. This is a list of reptiles of the Houtman Abrolhos:

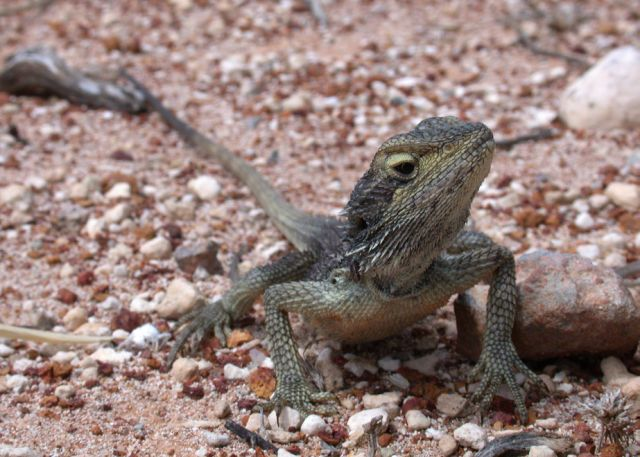
An Abrolhos dwarf bearded dragon (Pogona minor minima) on West Wallabi Island

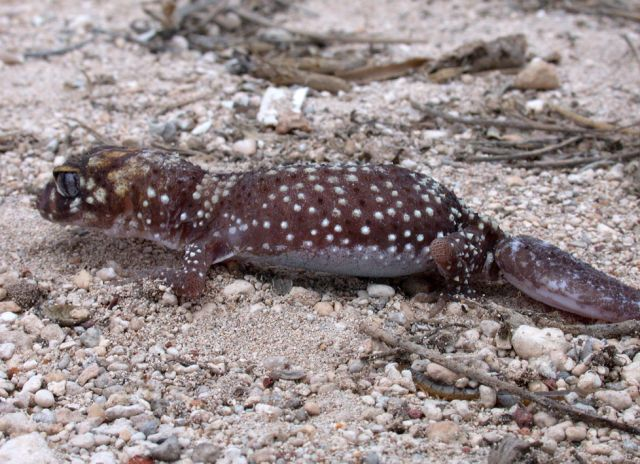
A barking gecko (Underwoodisaurus milii) on West Wallabi Island

Common name	Scientific name
Abrolhos dwarf bearded dragon	Pogona minor minima
Marbled gecko	Christinus marmoratus
Clawless gecko	Crenadactylus ocellatus
Ornate stone gecko	Diplodactylus ornatus
Variegated dtella	Gehyra variegata
Binoe's prickly gecko	Heteronotia binoei
South-western spiny-tailed gecko	Strophurus spinigerus
Barking gecko	Underwoodisaurus milii
Marble-faced delma	Delma australis
Gray's legless lizard	Delma grayii
Burton's legless lizard	Lialis burtonis
Spiny-palmed snake-eyed skink	Cryptoblepharus carnabyi
West Coast ctenotus	Ctenotus fallens
King's skink	Egernia kingii
Spiny-tailed skink	Egernia stokesii stokesii
South-western four-toed lerista	Lerista distinguenda
West Coast four-toed lerista	Lerista elegans
West Coast line-spotted lerista	Lerista lineopunctulata
Western worm lerista	Lerista praepedita
Common dwarf skink	Menetia greyii
Western pale-flecked morethia	Morethia lineoocellata
Southern pale-flecked morethia	Morethia obscura
Carpet python	Morelia spilota imbricata
Coastal burrowing snake	Simoselaps littoralis
Green turtle	Chelonia mydas
