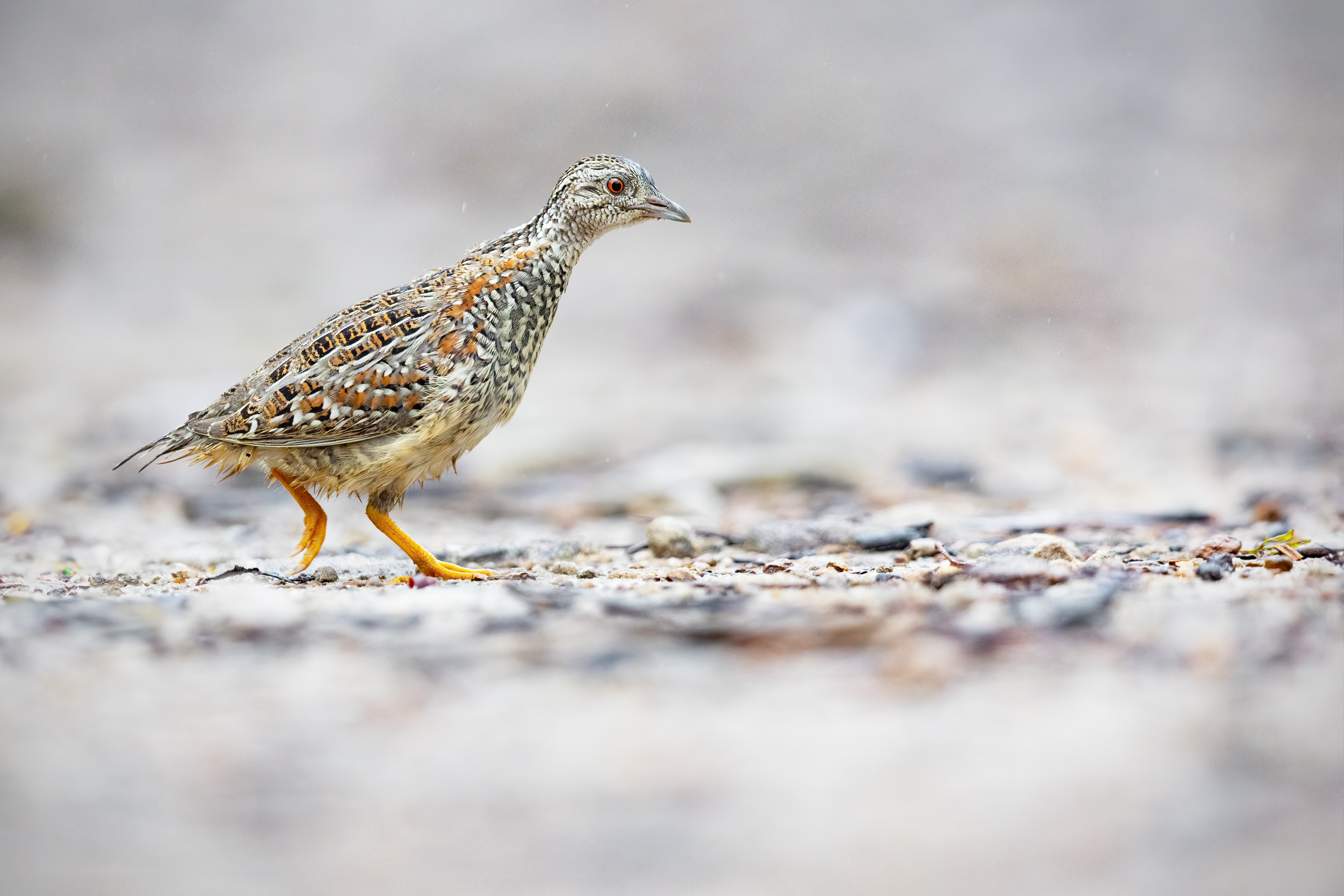
- Adult male painted buttonquail; mainland subspecies
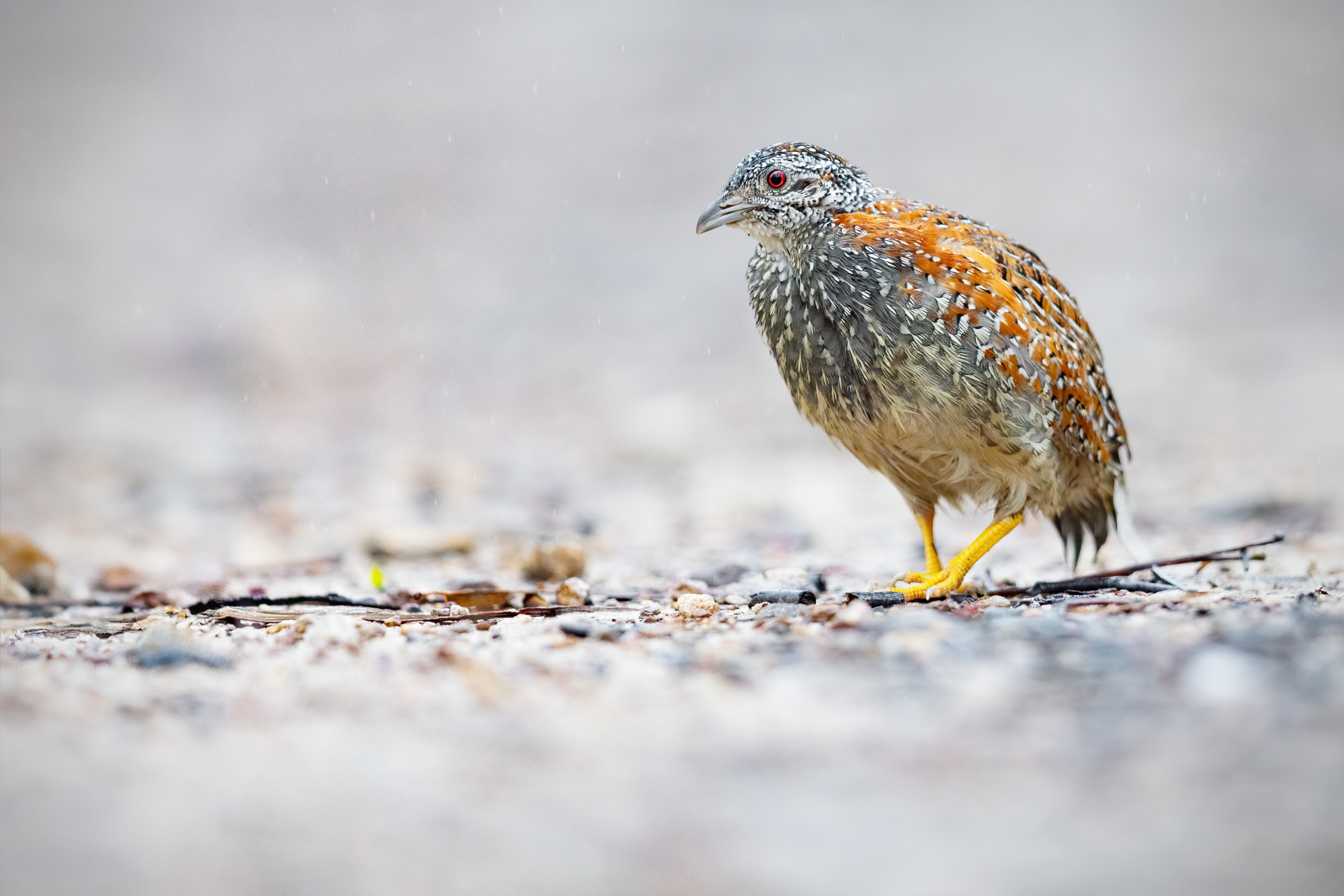
- Adult female painted buttonquail; mainland subspecies

Conservation status
- Least Concern (IUCN 3.1)

Scientific classification
- Kingdom: Animalia
- Phylum: Chordata
- Class: Aves
- Order: Charadriiformes
- Family: Turnicidae
- Genus: Turnix
- Species: T. varius

Binomial name
- Turnix varius (Latham, 1801)
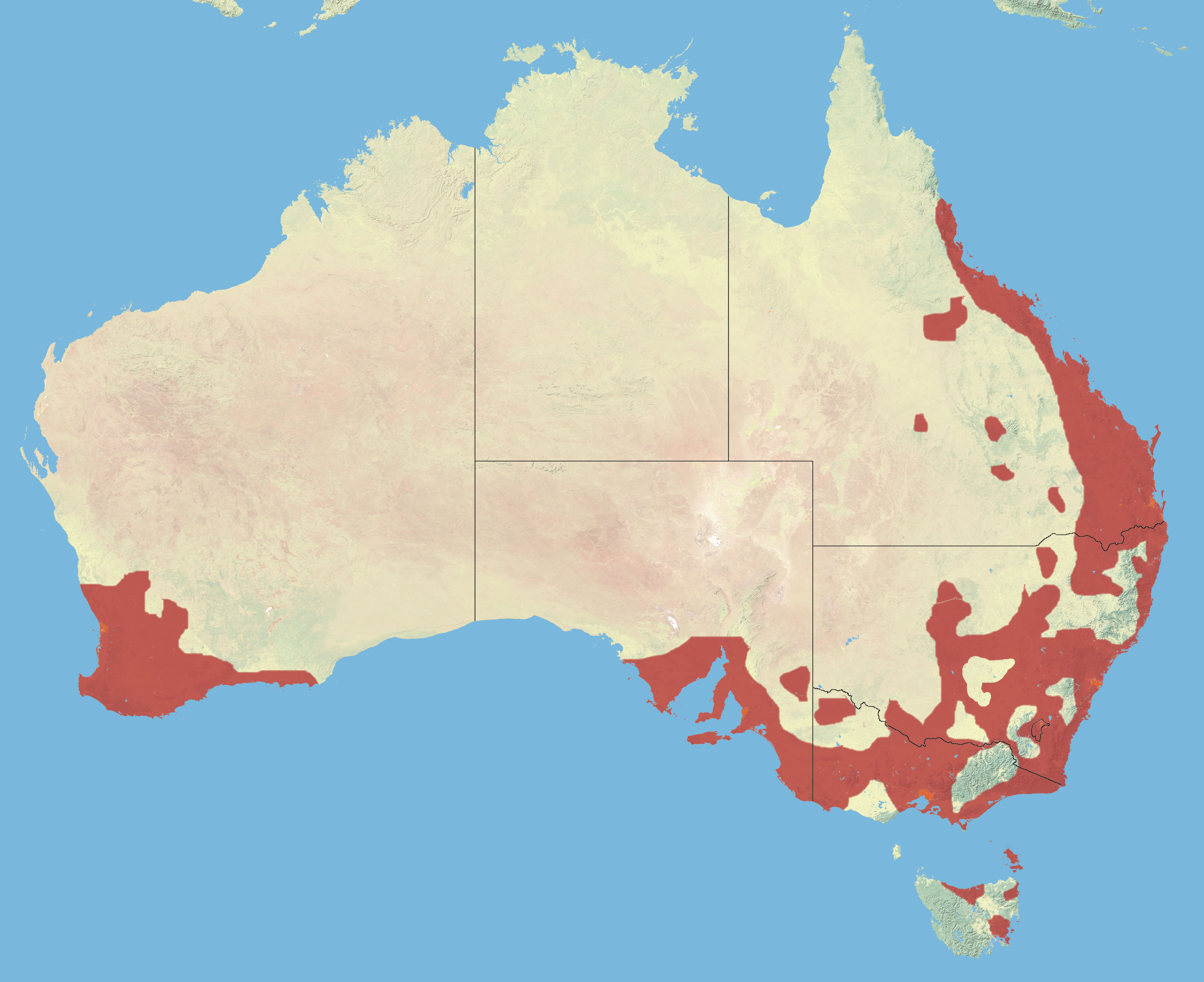
- Distribution of the painted button quail

Synonyms
- Turnix varia (Latham, 1801) (lapsus); Turnix novaecaledoniae

= Painted buttonquail =

Species of bird

The painted buttonquail (Turnix varius) is a species of buttonquail, the family Turnicidae, which resemble, but are unrelated to, the quails of Phasianidae. This species is resident in Australia where numbers are believed to be in decline. A subspecies, the Abrolhos painted buttonquail (Turnix varius scintillans), is endemic to the Houtman Abrolhos islands.

== Taxonomy ==
The painted buttonquail was first described by the English ornithologist John Latham in 1801 under the binomial name Perdix varia.

"Painted buttonquail" has been designated the official name by the International Ornithologists' Union (IOU).

Two subspecies are recognised.

The possibly-extinct New Caledonian buttonquail (Turnix novaecaledoniae) of New Caledonia was formerly considered a third subspecies, but was split as a distinct species by the IOC in 2021.

== Description ==
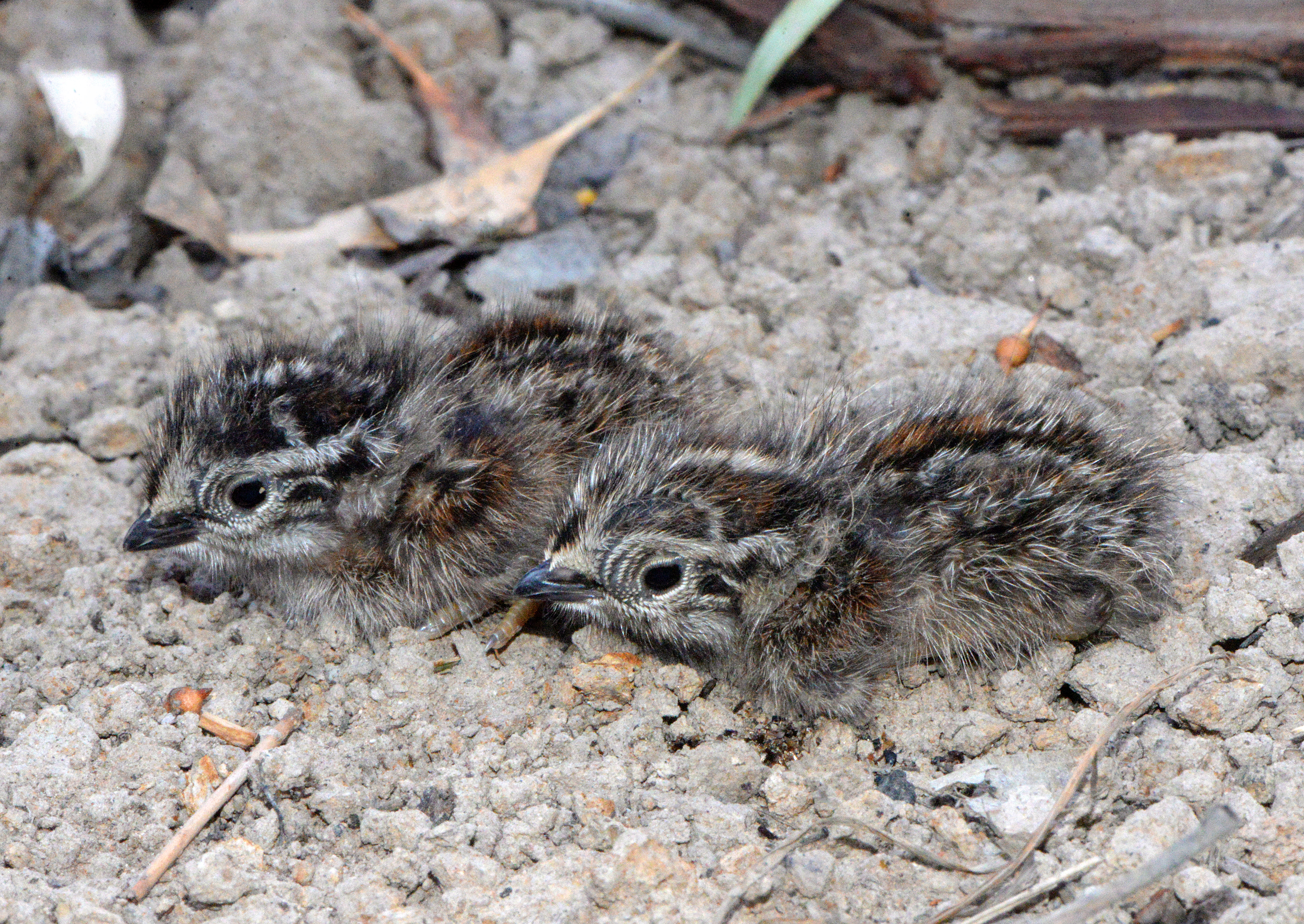
Chicks (mainland subspecies) adopting a defensive posture

The painted buttonquail is about 19 to 20 cm (7.5 to 7.9 in) long. It is a ground-dwelling bird and is found in grassy forests and woodlands. It feeds on insects and seeds, and the males incubate the eggs for a fortnight and then care for the young.

The female is the more brightly coloured of the sexes. Her eyes are red, and her crown, face and breast are flecked with white. Her shoulders are chestnut with thin white streaking above them. The male is slightly smaller and duller in colour.

== Distribution and habitat ==
The painted buttonquail is native to Australia. Its range extends from Queensland southwards to New South Wales, Victoria, South Australia and Tasmania. A separate population is present in the southwestern part of Western Australia. The subspecies Turnix varius scintillans is endemic to the Houtman Abrolhos islands off the west coast of Australia.

The painted buttonquail became established on Rottnest Island around 2002.

== Status ==
The painted buttonquail has a wide range. An estimate of the population size has not been made but numbers are suspected to be in decline. It is said to be common in suitable habitat in some areas and uncommon in others. The IUCN has listed it as being of "Least Concern".
