= Houtman Abrolhos Islands National Park =

National park in Western Australia

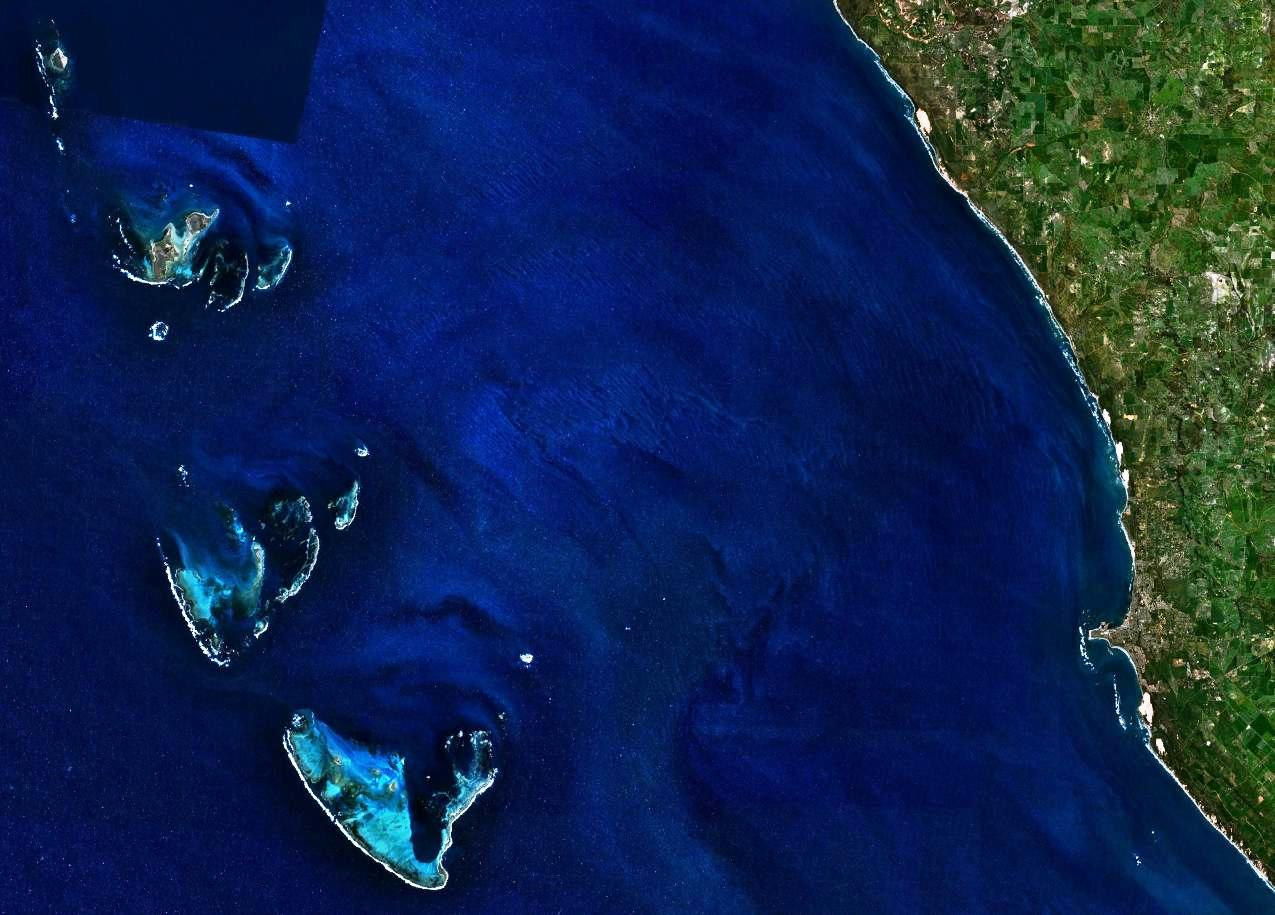
- The Houtman Abrolhos Islands and the coast of mainland Australia

- Location within Western Australia
- Houtman Abrolhos Islands National Park (●) is in the City of Greater Geraldton
- Type: National park
- Location: Mid West region
- Coordinates: 28.4635°S 113.6975°E
- Area: 1,564 ha (3,860 acres)
- Established: 2019
- Administrator: Department of Biodiversity, Conservation and Attractions

Houtman Abrolhos Islands National Park is a national park in the Mid West region of Western Australia, 75 kilometres (47 mi) west of Geraldton. It was declared on 5 July 2019, is located in the City of Greater Geraldton, and is part of the Geraldton Sandplains bioregion.

It encompasses the Houtman Abrolhos islands, a group of over 200 islands. The national park is open to day visitors but camping is not permitted on the islands of the park, with the islands being important breeding grounds for sea birds. The islands are separated into three main sub-groups, the Wallabi Group, Easter Group and Pelsaert Group.

The declaration of the national park in 2019 coincided with the 400th anniversary of the first sighting of the islands by Dutch explorers in 1619. The proposed creation of the park had first been announced by the Western Australian Government in 2017, with an initial investment of A$10 million to develop tourism facilities for the first two years of the park's existence.
