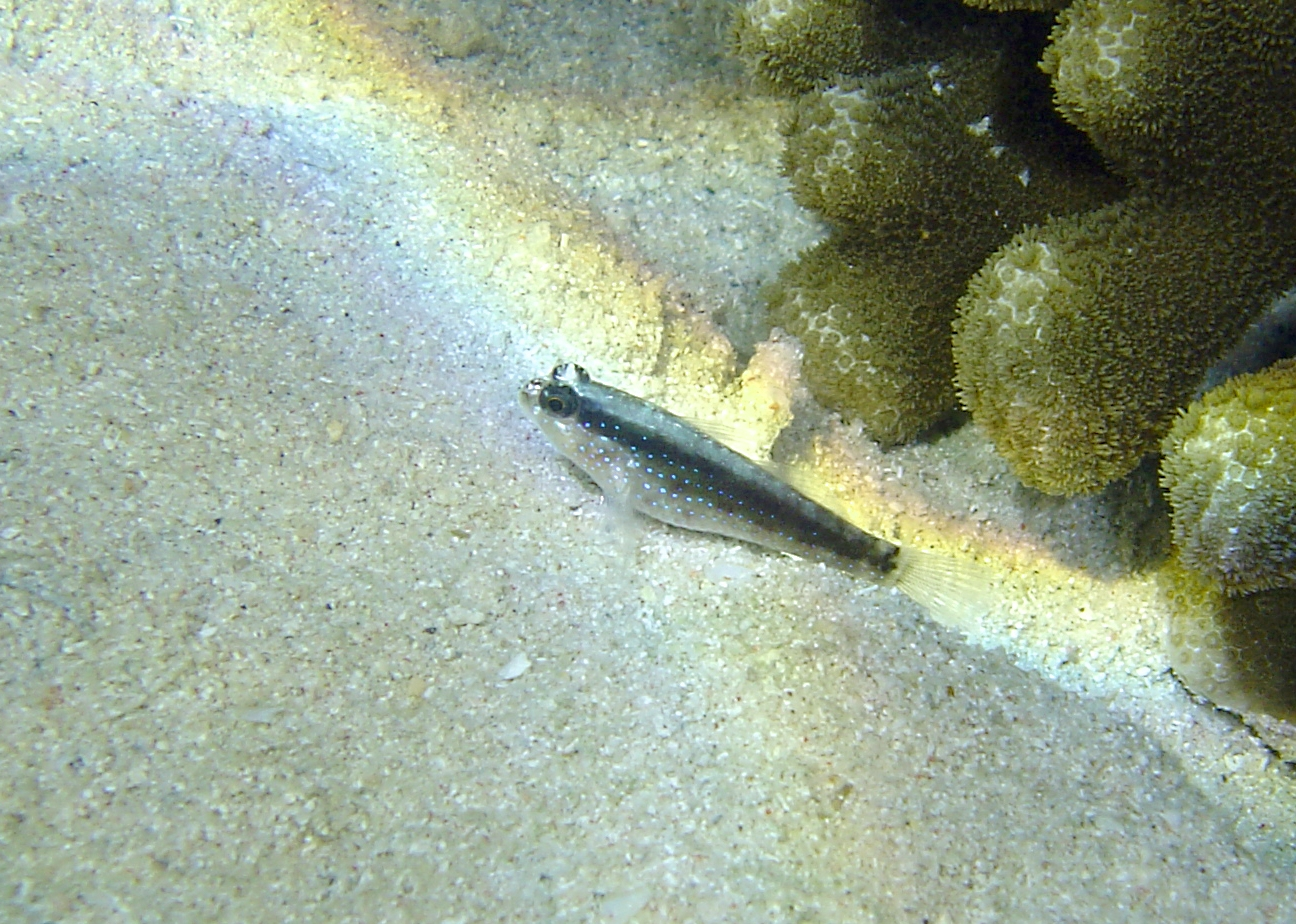

Scientific classification
- Kingdom: Animalia
- Phylum: Chordata
- Class: Actinopterygii
- Order: Gobiiformes
- Family: Gobiidae
- Genus: Asterropteryx
- Species: A. striata

Binomial name
- Asterropteryx striata Allen & Munday, 1995

= Asterropteryx striata =

Species of fish

Asterropteryx striata, known commonly as the striped goby, is a species of marine fish in the family Gobiidae.

It is widespread throughout the tropical waters of the central Indo-Pacific area.

This fish is a small size that can reach a maximum size of 2.3 cm length.
