= Houtman Abrolhos =

Group of islands and reefs off Western Australia

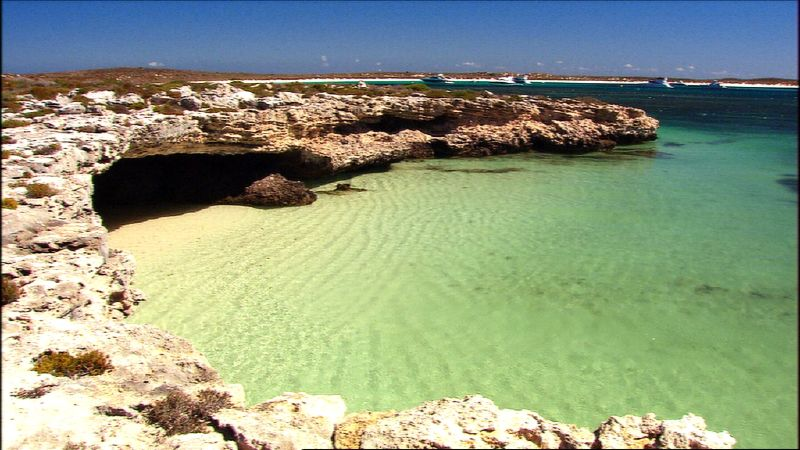
- A bay in the Houtman Abrolhos, 2006

- Location within Western Australia Location within Australia Location within Indian Ocean

Geography
- Location: Indian Ocean
- Coordinates: 28°43′S 113°47′E
- Archipelago: Houtman Abrolhos
- Total islands: 122
- Area: 16.4 km^{2} (6.3 sq mi)

Administration
- Australia
- State: Western Australia
- Federal electorates: Durack
- State electorate: Geraldton
- LGA: City of Greater Geraldton

Demographics
- Population: 6 (2016 census)
- Ethnic groups: Australians

Additional information
- Southernmost true coral reef in the Indian Ocean

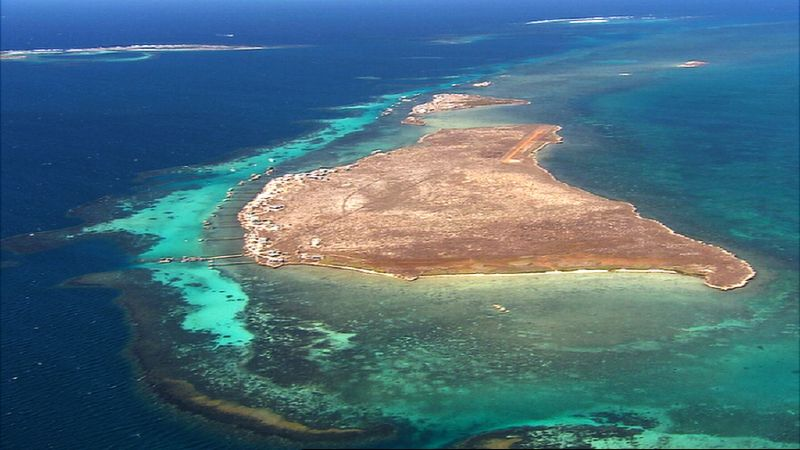
Aerial photograph of Rat Island (Easter Group), 2006

The Houtman Abrolhos (often called the Abrolhos Islands) is a chain of 122 islands and associated coral reefs in the Indian Ocean off the west coast of Australia about 80 kilometres (50 mi) west of Geraldton. It is the southernmost true coral reef in the Indian Ocean, and one of the highest latitude reef systems in the world.

It is one of the world's most important seabird breeding sites, and the centre of Western Australia's largest single-species fishery, the western rock lobster fishery. It has a small seasonal population of fishermen, and a limited number of tourists are permitted for day trips, but most of the land area is off-limits as a conservation habitat. It is the site of numerous shipwrecks, the most famous being two Dutch ships: Batavia, which was wrecked in 1629 (followed by massacre of over 100 survivors by mutineers), and Zeewijk, wrecked in 1727.

The islands are an unincorporated area with no municipal government, subject to direct administration of the Government of Western Australia. In July 2019, the Houtman Abrolhos was declared a national park by the state government.

== Geography ==
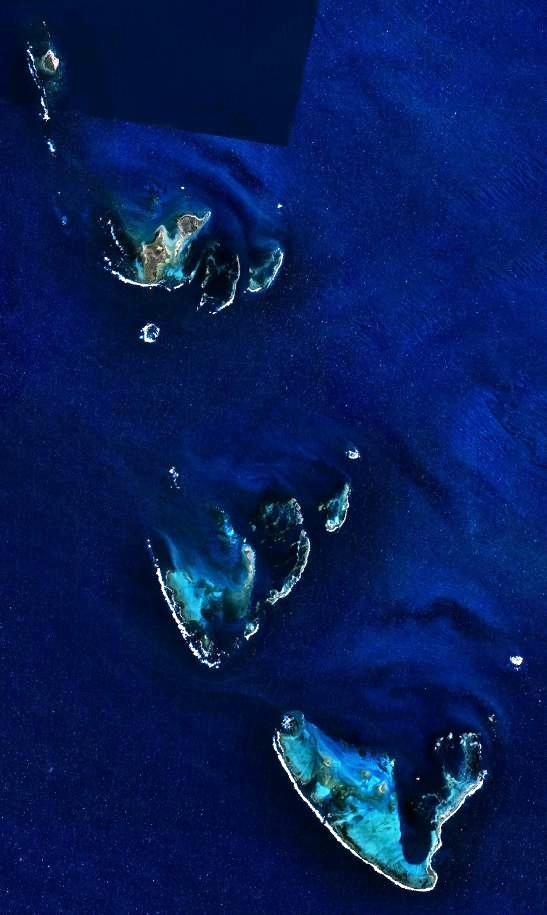
Houtman Abrolhos from space

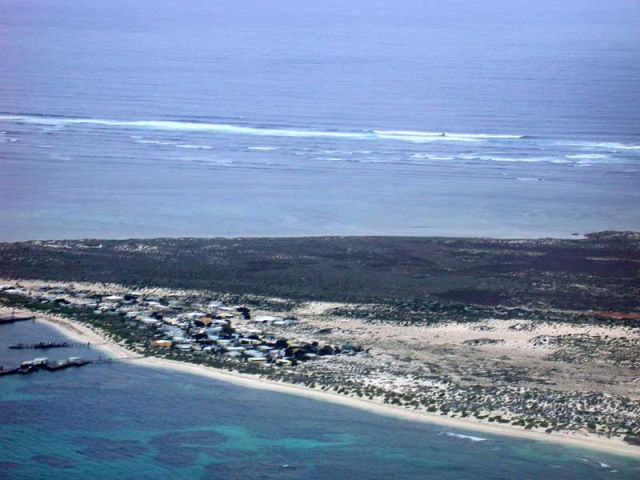
Aerial photograph of the southern half of North Island, looking westwards and showing the seasonal fishing camp

The Houtman Abrolhos archipelago is in the Indian Ocean off the west coast of Australia, about 80 kilometres (50 mi) west of Geraldton in the state of Western Australia. Its 122 islands and associated coral reefs comprise three island groups, the Wallabi Group, Easter Group and Pelsaert Group.

The most northerly group, the Wallabi Group, consists of an island clump about 17 kilometres (11 mi) by 10 kilometres (6 mi), and also takes in the outlying North Island 14 kilometres (9 mi) to the north-west. The main islands of the Wallabi Group are North Island, West Wallabi Island, East Wallabi Island and Beacon Island. The group is best known for the shipwreck of Batavia on Morning Reef near Beacon Island in 1629, and the subsequent mutiny and massacre that took place among the survivors.

The Easter Group lies to the southeast of the Wallabi Group, from which it is separated by a 9-kilometre-wide (5.6 mi) channel named Middle Channel. It is about 20 by 12 kilometres (12.4 mi × 7.5 mi), and consists of a number of islands, including Rat Island, Wooded Island, Morley Island, Suomi Island and Alexander Island.

Further to the southeast, across Zeewijk Channel, lies the Pelsaert Group, the most southerly true coral reef in the Indian Ocean. The main islands of this group are Middle Island, Square Island, Long Island, Pelsaert Island, Basile Island and the Mangrove Group. A great many ships have been wrecked in the Pelsaert Group, most notably Zeewijk, which was wrecked on the Half Moon Reef in 1727, the survivors staying on Gun Island for some time afterwards. Other wrecks include Ocean Queen, wrecked on the Half Moon Reef in 1842; Ben Ledi, wrecked off Pelsaert Island in 1879; Windsor, wrecked on the Half Moon Reef in 1908.; and possibly Ridderschap van Holland in 1694 and Aagtekerke in 1727.

== Governance ==
The islands are a part of Western Australia. They are part of the Electoral district of Geraldton, and the City of Greater Geraldton. In July 2019, the Houtman Abrolhos was declared a national park by the Western Australian Government.

In early November 2022, the government published its three-part plan to manage the site in the following 10 years, based on research and community consultation carried out after the preceding two years. Some critics thought that the plan did not encourage land-based tourism to the archipelago enough. A spokesperson for Western Australia's Department of Primary Industries and Regional Development said that their top priority is preservation of the wildlife on the islands.

== History ==
Aboriginal people visited the islands during the Holocene, as indicated by the discovery on Beacon Island of a flaked stone artefact made from Eocene fossiliferous chert.

=== Discovery by Europeans ===
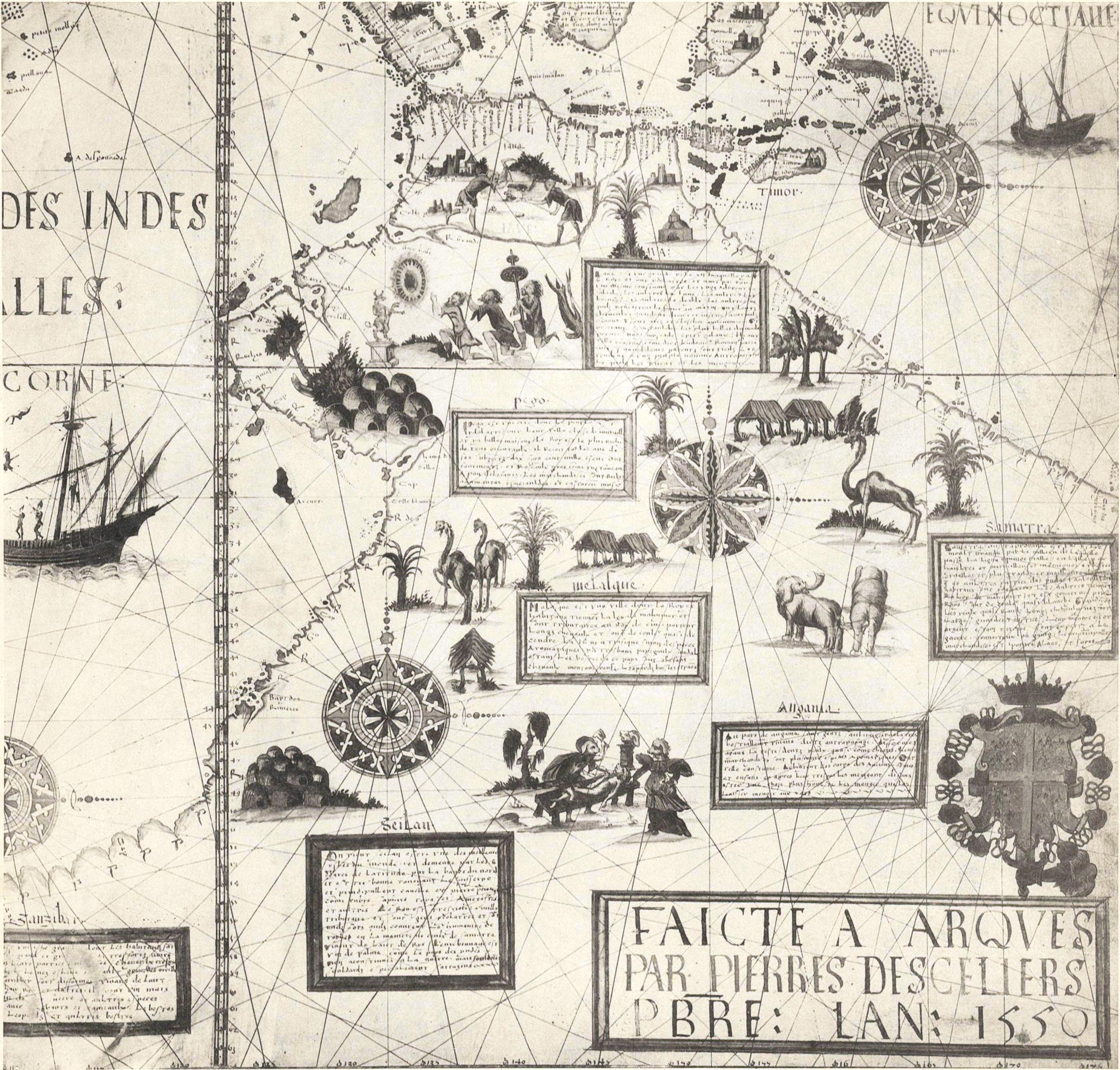
Detail from Pierre Desceliers' 1550 world map, purportedly showing the north west coast of Australia, with an island labelled "Arenes" at the position of the Houtman Abrolhos.

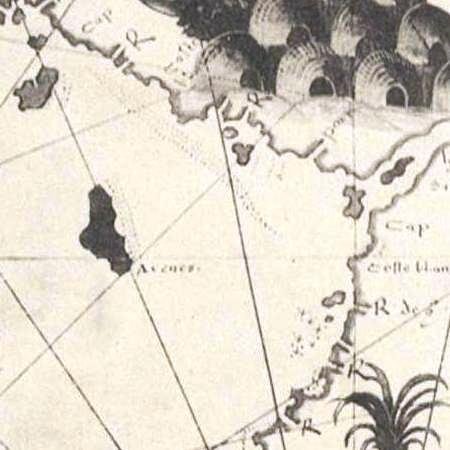
The island labelled "Arenes".

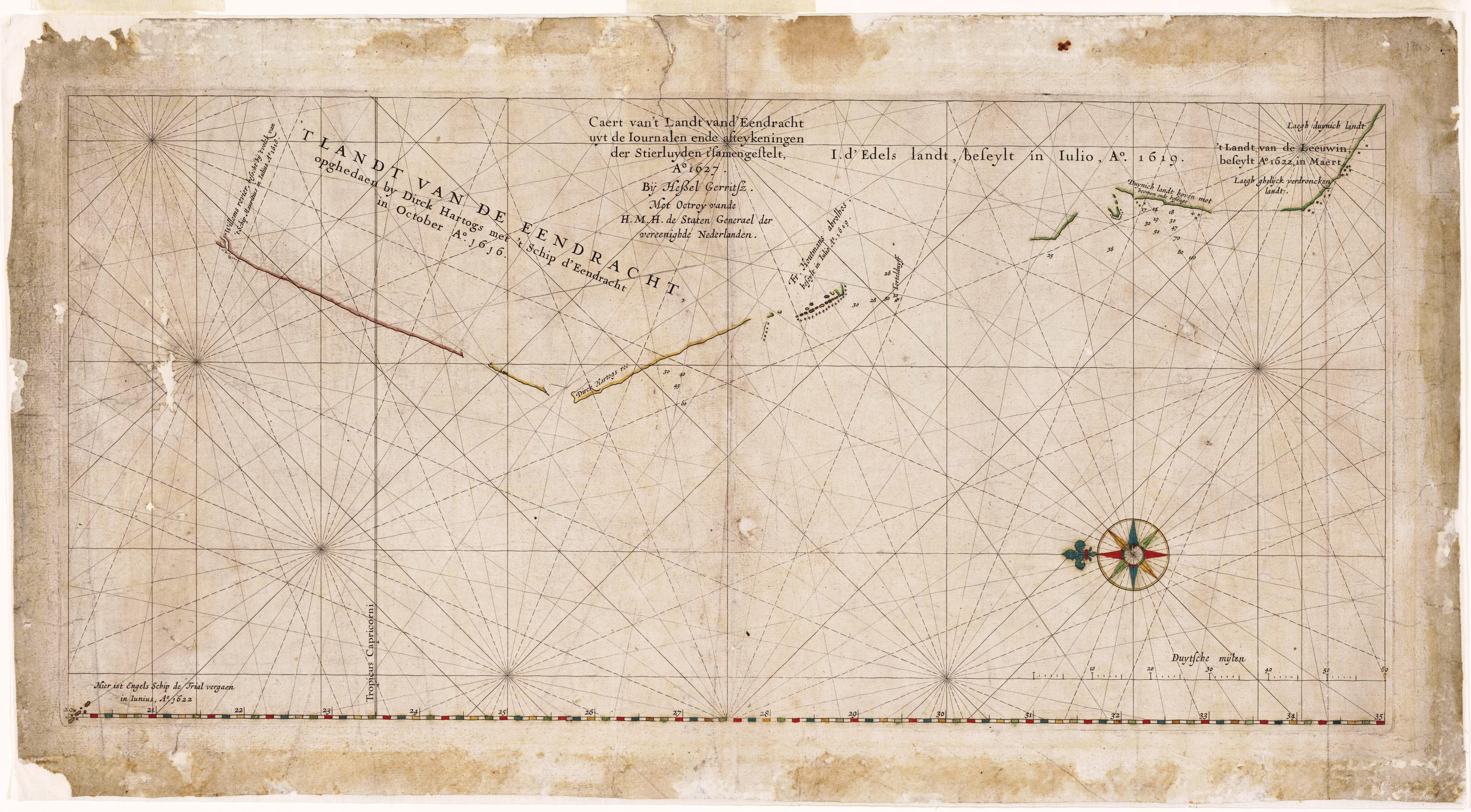
Hessel Gerritszoon's 1627 "Caert van't Landt van d'Eendracht" contains the first use of the name Houtman's Abrolhos in print.

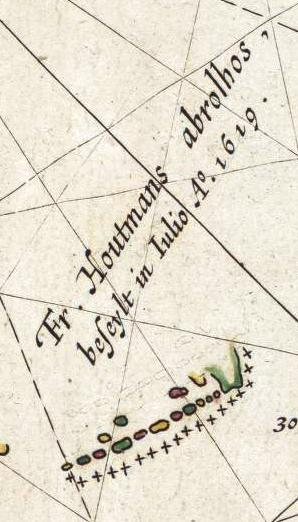
Detail of "Caert van't Landt van d'Eendracht", showing features labelled "Fr. Houtman's abrolhos"

According to the surviving historical record, the first sighting of the Houtman Abrolhos by Europeans was in 1619, sailing the Dutch VOC ships Dordrecht and Amsterdam, only three years after Dirk Hartog made the first authenticated sighting by a European of what is now Western Australia, and only 13 years after the first authenticated European voyage to Australia by the Duyfken, in 1606. Discovery of the islands was credited to Frederick de Houtman, Captain-General of Dordrecht, as it was Houtman who later wrote about the discovery in a letter to the directors of the Dutch East India Company: (Note: Houtman to Managers of the East India Company, October 7, 1619.)

On the 29th do. deeming ourselves to be in an open sea, we shaped our course north-by-east. At noon we were in 29° 32' S. Lat.; at night about three hours before daybreak, we again unexpectedly came upon a low-lying coast, a level, broken country with reefs all round it. We saw no high land or mainland, so that this shoal is to be carefully avoided as very dangerous to ships that wish to touch at this coast. It is fully ten miles in length, lying in 28° 46.

The word abrolho is Portuguese, making the Houtman Abrolhos one of only two Australian places with a Portuguese name, the other being Pedra Branca in Tasmania. The noun abrolhos means 'thorn', and originally designated the spiny fruit of the bindii plant (Tribulus terrestris). Etymologically it is a contraction of the Portuguese expression abre os olhos (transl. open your eyes; that is, to protect yourself). As a technical term this phytonym was later applied to caltrops (chevaux de frise), i.e. "spiked obstructions", and Portuguese sailors used the word to refer to offshore reefs.

Houtman thus named the islands using a Portuguese loanword that was current in the Dutch marine terminology of the time. John Forsyth states that the islands are named after the Abrolhos Archipelago off the east coast of Brazil, which was discovered and named by Portuguese navigators early in the 16th century. That position is supported by the fact that Houtman was familiar with the Abrolhos Archipelago, having sailed through it in 1598. Others assert that abrolhos was a Portuguese lookout's cry which, like many other Portuguese maritime terms, was taken up by sailors of other nationalities, becoming, by Houtman's time, a Dutch loan word for offshore reefs. Additionally, Frederick De Houtman had at least some grasp of Portuguese, having been sent by Amsterdam merchants to Lisbon from 1592 – 1594 with his brother Cornelis to learn about the Portuguese route to the Indies. Frederick also appears to have been a keen linguist, having published the first-known Dutch-Malay and Dutch-Malagasy dictionaries in 1603. He appears to have been fluent-enough in Portuguese that he might have used an evocative Portuguese word if it described the area better than any Dutch word did.

It has been argued by proponents of the theory of Portuguese discovery of Australia that the Portuguese name is evidence that the islands were charted by Portuguese navigators in the 16th century. Kenneth McIntyre, for example, claimed that Houtman was in possession of Portuguese maps of the west coast of Australia, and that he named the islands "abrolhos" in accordance with the name on those maps. Charting of the islands was previously credited to Jorge de Menezes, but is now only listed as a possibility.

The primary piece of evidence used to support the claim of Portuguese priority is the 16th century Dieppe maps, some of which are alleged to show the west coast of Australia, including an island at the position of the Houtman Abrolhos. That island is unlabelled on most of the Dieppe maps but, on Pierre Desceliers' 1550 map, it is labelled Arenes. In 1895, George Collingridge suggested that Arenes was a corruption of Abrolhos, but that was mocked by J. E. Heeres in 1898, and, according to J. S. Battye, "this suggestion can scarcely be regarded seriously. It certainly does not in any way add to the merit of the Portuguese claim".

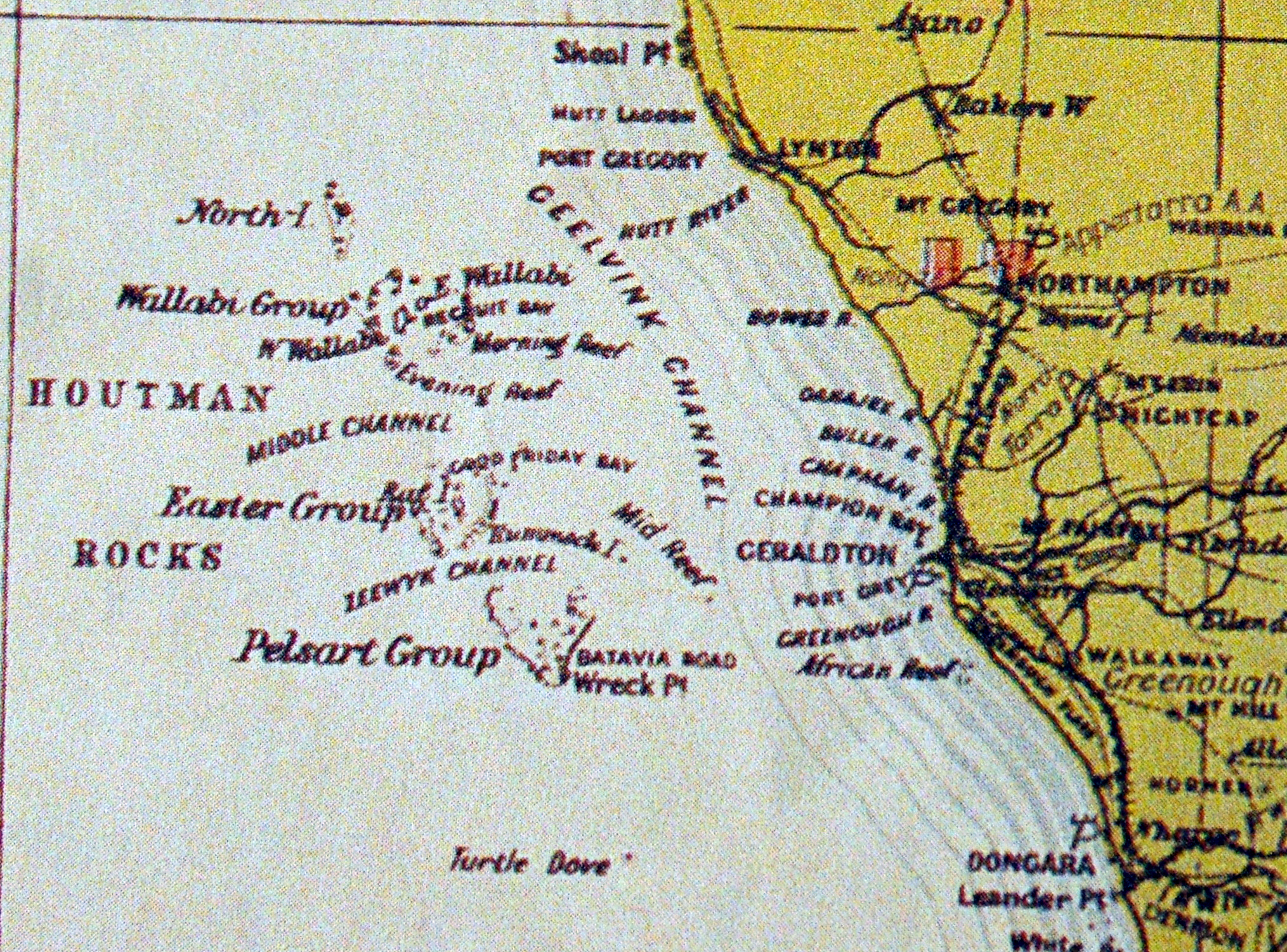
Houtman Abrolhos labelled 'Houtman Rocks' on Western Australia state map for 1897

Setting aside the Portuguese claims, the Houtman Abrolhos first appear on a map in 1622, on a little-known portolan by Hessel Gerritsz. They are unlabelled, marked merely as a group of small circles. They are first named in print in Gerritsz' 1627 map Caert van't Landt van d'Eendracht, where they bear the label Fr. Houtman's abrolhos. On a map produced by Gerritsz the following year, they are labelled Houtman's Abrolhos.

On British Admiralty charts, the islands are labelled Houtman's Rocks.

=== Wreck of Batavia ===
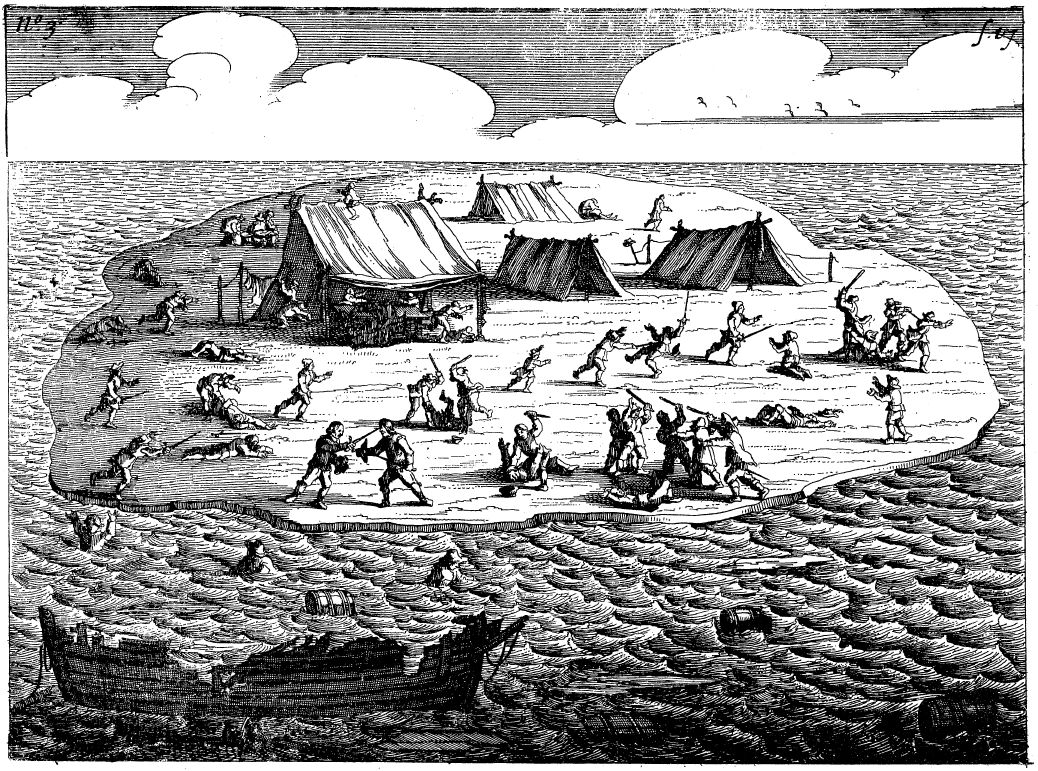
A 1647 engraving showing the Beacon Island massacre of survivors of the Batavia shipwreck

In 1629, some of the islands were the scene of an infamous shipwreck and mutiny. The Dutch ship Batavia, under the command of Francisco Pelsaert, ran aground on her maiden voyage to the port of Batavia, the capital of the Dutch East Indies. Pelsaert and some of his crew set off in an open boat to Batavia (now Jakarta) to get help. A group of the crew who remained on some of the islets terrorised and killed many of the other crew and passengers, including women and children. When Pelsaert returned, a number of the culprits were executed.

=== Wreck of Zeewijk ===
The Zeewijk was the last of the four Dutch East Indiamen to be wrecked on the west coast of Australia. Due to the Ship's Council having made the inexplicable decision to disregard sailing orders and actually seek out the west coast of Australia, the ship ran onto the Half Moon Reef at about 7:30 pm on 9 June 1727. It did not break up immediately, and the heavy swell made evacuation impossible until 18 June. The longboat was launched on that day, and the crew and stores were thereafter gradually transferred to nearby Gun Island. Later, the men landed ten chests of money, containing 315,836 guilders and weighing a total of three tonnes (6,600 lb).

The crew of Zeewijk were stranded in the Pelsaert Group for ten months, during which time they lived off seals, seabirds, eggs, and victuals salvaged from the wreck. They obtained some water from rainfall, but were forced to explore throughout the group in search of further supplies. A great many men died on the islands, including two boys who were accused of sodomy and marooned on separate islands of the Mangrove Group.

On 10 July the longboat, fitted for a voyage and crewed with eleven men, was sent to Batavia to obtain help. It never arrived there, and nothing is known of its fate. Four months later the castaways began building a 18-metre (60 ft) boat, sufficient to carry all the men and the money chests. Completed in March 1728 and affectionately named Sloepie ("little sloop"), it was the first ocean-going vessel built in Australian history. On 26 March 1728, the surviving men set sail for Batavia, arriving in Sunda Strait late the following month.

=== Gun Island and phosphate mining ===
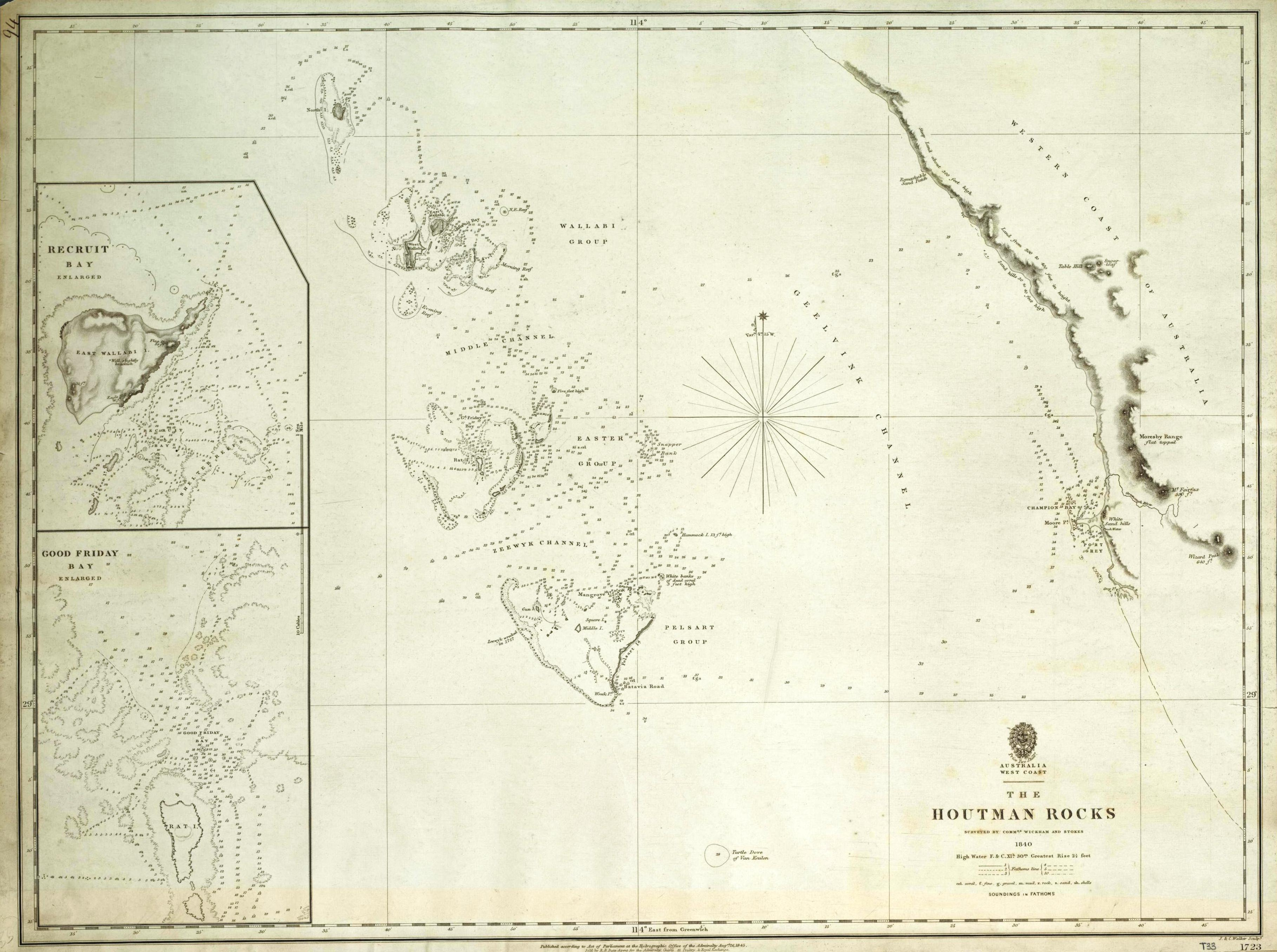
In 1845, the British Admiralty published a chart of "The Houtman Rocks", based on the 1840 survey of John Clements Wickham and John Lort Stokes.

During Admiralty surveys of the north west coast in 1840, crew from HMS Beagle discovered a brass gun of about three pounds calibre, an iron swivel on which paint still adhered as well as numerous other artefacts signifying European occupation, on the largest island in the Pelsart Group. The commander, John Clements Wickham, named the place Gun Island and the passage between the Easter and Pelsart Groups, Zeewijk Channel. Later during the 19th century many islets were used by men collecting guano.

A lease to mine rock phosphate on the islands was obtained by Charles Broadhurst in 1884. After surveying the area he constructed a plant, stone jetty and tramways on Rat Island, a number of buildings on Rat, Gun and Pelsaert islands and had over 40 Malay workers mining and processing the phosphate for export. Over 48,000 tonnes (110 million pounds) was shipped between 1884 and 1896.

== Tenure, governance and management ==
The islands are a part of the Division of Durack in the federal House of Representatives and the electoral district of Geraldton in the Western Australian Legislative Council. Management is vested in the Department of Fisheries.

== Geology ==
Some of the islands are considered to be remnants of the mainland isolated by rising sea level during the last 8,000 to 10,000 years, while others were more recently formed from coral rubble and are made of limestone under a layer of sand, cemented coral rubble and shingle.

== Oceanography ==
=== Bathymetry ===
The Houtman Abrolhos lies in the Indian Ocean about 60 kilometres (40 mi) off the coast of Western Australia, near the edge of Australia's continental shelf. At less than 50 metres (160 ft) deep, the shelf is quite shallow. It is also fairly level, the depth increasing to the west at a modest gradient of about 1.3 metres per kilometre (7 ft/mi). About five kilometres (3 mi) to the west of the Houtman Abrolhos lies the shelf break, beyond which the seabed falls away much more steeply, averaging around 50 metres per kilometre (260 ft/mi).

The islands of each island group arise from a single carbonate platform, so the waters within an island group are mostly shallow. The channels between groups are 40 to 50 metres (130 to 160 ft) deep, so no impediment to the exchange of offshore and inshore waters.

=== Currents ===
The Houtman Abrolhos lies almost directly in the path of the Leeuwin Current, which draws warm, low-saline water of tropical origin southwards along the coast of Western Australia. This current flows all year round, but is strongest during Southern Hemisphere winter months. In general the Leeuwin Current runs along the shelf break, and thus passes close by the western edge of the Abrolhos. It meanders, sometimes passing well out to sea and sometimes directly through the island chain, bathing it in warm tropical water; Although the direction of the Leeuwin Current is predominantly southerly, Shark Bay and the Houtman Abrolhos together act as a topographical trigger for the forming of eddies, so the Abrolhos can experience currents from any direction, even when the Leeuwin Current is flowing strongly.

Unlike most other major ocean currents, there is no large-scale coastal upwelling associated with the Leeuwin Current. There is limited evidence for some sporadic, localised upwelling in the vicinity of the Abrolhos, but if so it appears to have little effect on the extremely low levels of nutrients in the water.

=== Temperature and salinity ===
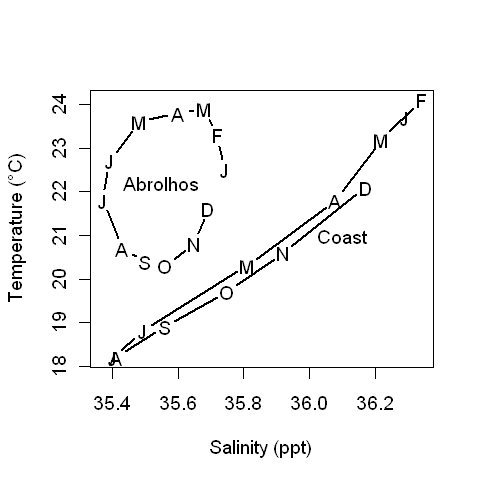
Mean monthly temperature versus salinity for the Houtman Abrolhos and the adjacent coast in 1994, showing the Houtman Abrolhos to be much less variable.

Sea temperature at the islands varies according to a diurnal cycle, with the water at its coldest between six and eight in the morning, and at its warmest between three and four in the afternoon. In summer the daily temperature range is around 1 °C (2 °F); in winter it is about half that.

There is also an annual cycle, with sea temperature varying by a little less than 4 °C (7 °F) over the year, peaking at nearly 24 °C (75 °F) in March, and falling to around 20 °C (68 °F) in September. This variability is much less than in nearby coastal waters, which reaches a similar peak in summer but drops as low as 18 °C (64 °F) in winter. The relatively low variability in sea temperatures at the Abrolhos is largely attributable to the Leeuwin Current, which bathes the islands in warm tropical water during winter months.

A similar annual pattern occurs in salinity. There is a clear seasonal variation, with values ranging from a summer high of around 35.7 ppt, to a winter low of around 35.4 ppt. As with water temperatures, the variability in salinity is much smaller than in coastal waters, where summer salinity reaches 36.4 ppt. This difference is partly due to the low-salinity waters of the Leeuwin Current, but there are a number of other factors involved, including high evaporation of coastal waters in summer.

Temperatures can also vary substantially from year to year. Annual mean temperatures vary by as much as 1 °C (2 °F); with cooler years usually cooler throughout the year. There is evidence that annual mean temperatures are related to El Niño-Southern Oscillation events.

The water column is generally well-mixed, with no evidence of a significant halocline or thermocline. Mean differences in water temperature between sea surface and sea bed range from only 0.5 °C (1 °F) in summer to almost 0 °C (0 °F) in winter, and differences in salinity are very small even when the Leeuwin Current is at its strongest.

=== Sea levels ===
As with the rest of southwestern Australia, tides at the Houtman Abrolhos are small and irregular. There is little tidal data available for the islands, but what there is accords very closely with the data for Geraldton. Geraldton tides follow a diurnal pattern, with maximum tidal ranges of around 1 metre (3 ft).

Mean sea levels at Geraldton show seasonal fluctuations, being higher in winter when the Leeuwin Current is at its peak. There are also variations from year to year, which are strongly associated with the El Niño-Southern Oscillation (ENSO) cycle. Apparently, ENSO events induce a weaker Leeuwin Current, which results in lower sea levels.

There is no published information on wave heights in the Abrolhos. In the open ocean, waves are typically a little over two metres high all year round. Nearer the mainland, they are usually less than 1.2 metres (3 ft 11 in), with a calmer period in March and April, and another in October and November.

== Climate ==
As of 2012, the Australian Bureau of Meteorology has not published climatic data for the Houtman Abrolhos. An automatic weather station has been installed on North Island since 1990, and hourly measures of precipitation, air temperature, wind speed, wind direction, relative humidity and atmospheric pressure have been publicly available since then. Based on this and other data, researchers have put together a picture of the Abrolhos' climate.

The islands have a Mediterranean climate (semi-arid climate, or BSh, under Köppen climate classification) with warm dry summers and cooler, wet winters. Mean temperatures range from 9.3 to 19.5 °C (48.7 to 67.1 °F) in July, and from 19.1 to 32.4 °C (66.4 to 90.3 °F) in February. These temperatures have a substantially smaller range than on the mainland: the summer temperature is typically a degree cooler, while winter temperatures are a good deal warmer. This is due to the influence of the ocean, and to the Leeuwin Current.

86% of the rain falls between April and September; on average there are 89 raindays, resulting in 469 millimetres (18.5 in) of rain. The wettest month is June, when over 100 millimetres (3.9 in) typically falls. In contrast, only about 70 millimetres (2.8 in) can be expected to fall between October and March.

It is nearly always windy. During summer a high pressure ridge lies to the south, causing persistent winds from the southeast or southwest, at speeds exceeding 8.7 metres per second (17 kn) almost half the time. During autumn and winter, the ridge moves northwards, increasing the atmospheric pressure over the islands, resulting in highly variable winds. Winter tends to produce both the strongest gales and the most frequent periods of calm.

In addition to these winds, there is daily pattern of land breezes in the morning, followed by the onset of south-westerly sea breezes in the afternoon. This pattern is caused by temperature differences between the land and the ocean, and is not as strong in the Houtman Abrolhos as on the mainland, but is present nonetheless.

Three classes of storm have been identified for the region. Brief squalls may occur between December and April. A tropical cyclone occurs in the area about once in three years, between January and April; these may generate extremely high wind speeds that are potentially destructive. During winter, extra-tropical cyclones sometimes pass south of Geraldton, generating winter gales with gusts of up to 35 metres per second, the wind direction from the northwest initially, then gradually moving around to southerly.

== Biogeography ==
Under the Interim Biogeographic Regionalisation for Australia (IBRA), the islands of the Houtman Abrolhos fall within the Geraldton Hills subregion of the Geraldton Sandplains region. The main biogeographic significance of the islands is their isolation, allowing them to provide refugia for such threatened fauna as tammar wallabies (Macropus eugenii), Australian sea lions (Neophoca cinerea) and rare breeding seabirds.

In marine terms, the Houtman Abrolhos is located within the Southwest Shelf Transition, an Integrated Marine and Coastal Regionalisation of Australia (IMCRA) biotone that takes in the continental shelf from Perth to Geraldton. This province is defined as the area of shelf where tropical waters intergrade into temperate, thus supporting both tropical and temperate biota. In addition, this area contains the highest concentration of west coast endemics.

Consistent with this, the Houtman Abrolhos contains a mix of tropical, temperate and west coast endemic fauna, resulting in unusual associations such as the occurrence of tropical corals in close association with temperate macro-algae. The proportions of tropical, temperate and west coast endemic biota vary from taxonomic group to group, but in general the biota is dominated by tropical species. This is attributable to the location of the Houtman Abrolhos at the northern limit of the Southwest Shelf Transition, together with the warming influence of the Leeuwin Current.

Under IMCRA, the Southwest Shelf Transition divides into two meso-scale bioregions. One is named Abrolhos Islands, and covers the shelf waters surrounding the Houtman Abrolhos, with an area of 6,645 square kilometres (2,566 sq mi). The other bioregion, Central West Coast, covers the remaining area.

== Terrestrial flora ==
The vegetation of the Houtman Abrolhos islands is dominated by chenopod shrubs. The flora is generally the same as the coastal flora of the adjacent mainland, with the exception of the islands' mangrove, saltbush and salt lake vegetation.

=== Flora ===
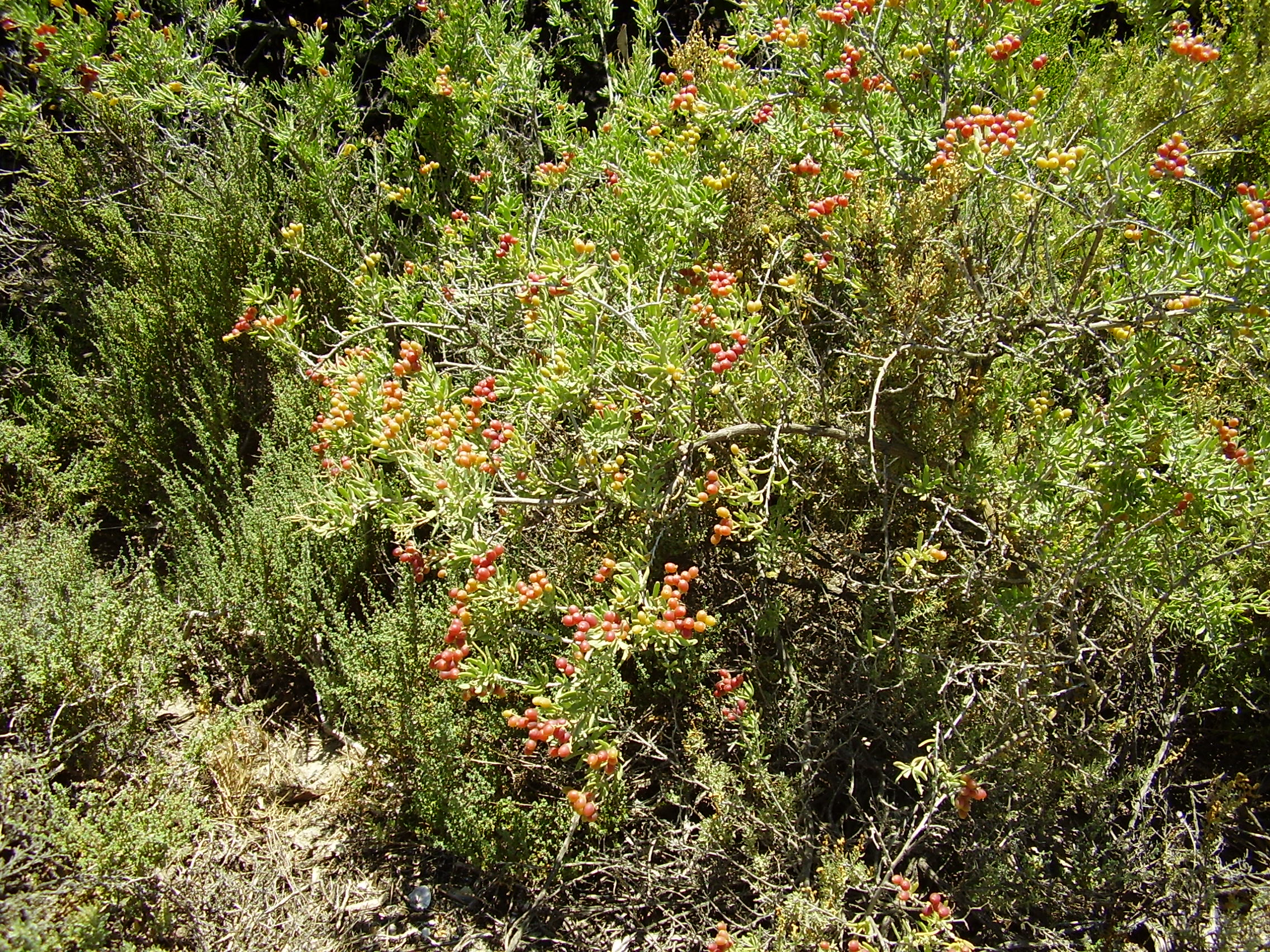
Nitraria billardierei (nitre bush), pictured here in Adelaide, South Australia, is the most widely distributed plant species in the Houtman Abrolhos

The vascular flora of the Houtman Abrolhos has been thoroughly surveyed, and species lists have been published for 119 islands. As of 2001, these lists totalled 239 species from 68 families. A further six species have been collected in the Houtman Abrolhos, but cannot be allocated to islands because insufficient location information was recorded. There have also been collections of mosses, liverworts and lichens, but no information has been published on these non-vascular groups.

The islands with the greatest floristic diversity are East and West Wallabi Islands, with 124 and 97 species respectively. 54 species occur in all three island groups. The most widely distributed species are Nitraria billardierei (nitre bush), which has been recorded on 106 islands; the exotic Mesembryanthemum crystallinum (iceplant), on 88 islands; Threlkeldia diffusa (coast bonefruit), on 72 islands; and Atriplex cinerea (grey saltbush), on 70 islands. On the other hand, Eucalyptus oraria (ooragmandee) and Acacia didyma occur only on East Wallabi Island.

As of 2001, five species of priority flora occurred on the islands. One, Acacia didyma, is no longer considered a priority species. The remaining priority species are Chthonocephalus tomentellus, which is rated Priority Two under the Department of Environment and Conservation's Declared Rare and Priority Flora List; Calocephalus aervoides and Galium migrans, both Priority Three; and Lepidium puberulum, Priority Four.

Ninety-five exotic species from 29 families have been recorded. In general, islands that have or had human settlements are the weediest. Of greatest concern is the noxious weed Lycium ferocissimum (African boxthorn), which has long spines that can trap birds. This weed was recorded on the islands as early as 1970. Efforts to eradicate it began in 1990; there was a lull in eradication in the late 1990s, but the program was later reinstated, and in July 2007, the Department of Environment and Conservation reported that the species had been eradicated from 14 of the 18 islands on which it had been recorded. Other noxious weeds include Opuntia stricta (prickly pear), Verbesina encelioides and Echium plantagineum (Paterson's curse).

== Terrestrial fauna ==
=== Birds ===
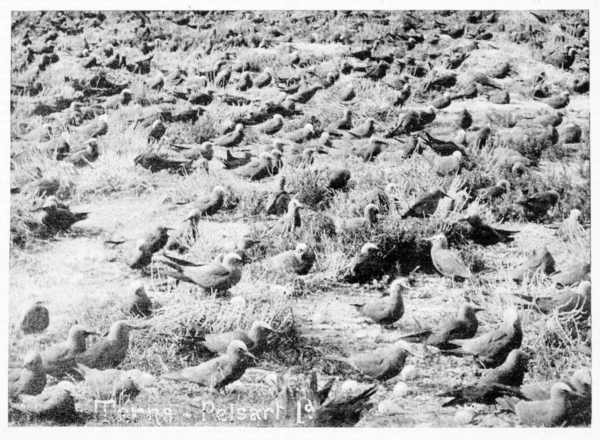
Terns, Pelsaert Island, 1895

The Houtman Abrolhos is home to around 100 species of bird; for a complete list, see list of birds of the Houtman Abrolhos. Six species are land birds, and three are shore birds. The remainder, the vast majority, are seabirds. Most seabird species have a tropical distribution, but some occur in both tropical and warm-temperate seas, and a small number are warm-temperate only.

When numbers of individuals are taken into account, the tropical birds overwhelmingly dominate. The islands are one of the most important breeding sites for tropical seabirds in Australia and have been identified by BirdLife International as an Important Bird Area (IBA). They contain by far the largest colonies of wedge-tailed shearwater in the eastern Indian Ocean, with over a million breeding pairs recorded there in 1994. They also contain Western Australia's only breeding colonies of the lesser noddy, and the largest colonies in Western Australia of the little shearwater, white-faced storm petrel, common noddy, Caspian tern, crested tern, roseate tern and fairy tern. In addition, they contain important breeding areas for the Pacific reef heron, Pacific gull, bridled tern, white-bellied sea eagle and osprey.

There are two subspecies of bird endemic to the islands. The Abrolhos painted button-quail occurs only on five islands in the Wallabi Group, and is protected as rare under the Wildlife Conservation Act 1950. Also gazetted as rare, the Australasian subspecies of the lesser noddy, Anous tenuirostris melanops, breeds only on Wooded Island, Morley Island and Pelsaert Island.

=== Mammals ===
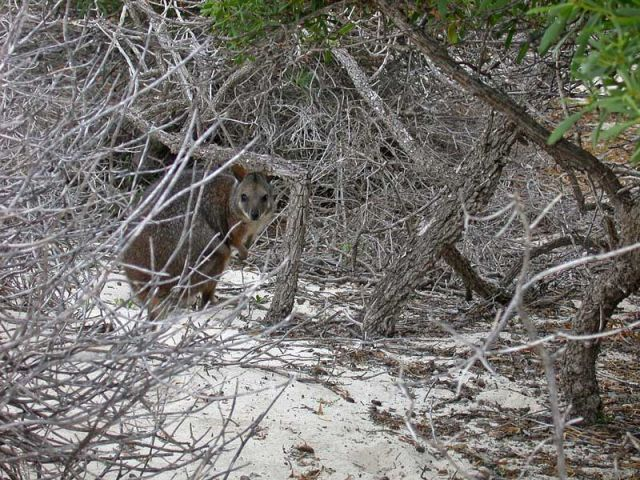
A tammar wallaby on North Island

Only two species of land mammal are indigenous to the Houtman Abrolhos, the tammar wallaby (Macropus eugenii) and the bush rat (Rattus fuscipes). Both are native only to West and East Wallabi Islands, although R. fuscipes has not been collected on East Wallabi Island since August 1967, and is probably extinct there. The tammar wallaby was seen on West Wallabi Island by survivors of the Batavia shipwreck, and recorded by Francisco Pelsart in his 1629 Ongeluckige Voyagie. This represents the first recorded sighting of a macropod by Europeans, and probably also the first sighting of an Australian mammal. Tammar wallabies were introduced to North Island from East Wallabi Island by fishermen, probably in the 1950s, but failed to establish themselves. In 1987 they were reintroduced again, this time successfully. By the 2000s, there were over 400 wallabies on the island, resulting in overgrazing of native vegetation and increased erosion. Research into the effectiveness of controlling population levels by the use of implanted contraceptives was begun in 2005, but in July 2007 the research was discontinued and the population culled instead.

Two introduced mammals are established on the islands. The domestic cat (Felis silvestris catus) was introduced to Rat Island around 1900, and the house mouse (Mus musculus) was introduced onto North Island in the 1970s, presumably with food. In 1995 the house mouse was reported as also present on Rat Island for many years before 1987, but a recent report makes no mention of this. In addition, three introduced mammals were previously established in the Houtman Abrolhos, but have since been eradicated. The black rat (Rattus rattus) was established on Pigeon and Rat Islands, but has been eradicated by poisoning. The European rabbit (Oryctolagus cuniculus) has been introduced at various times onto Leo Island, Middle Island, Morley Island, Pelsaert Island and Wooded Island. In the case of Pelsaert Island, it is not clear whether it ever established; in all other cases, established populations have been eradicated by poisoning. The domestic goat (Capra aegagrus hircus) is also reported to have been present on East Wallabi Island, but is no longer.

=== Reptiles ===
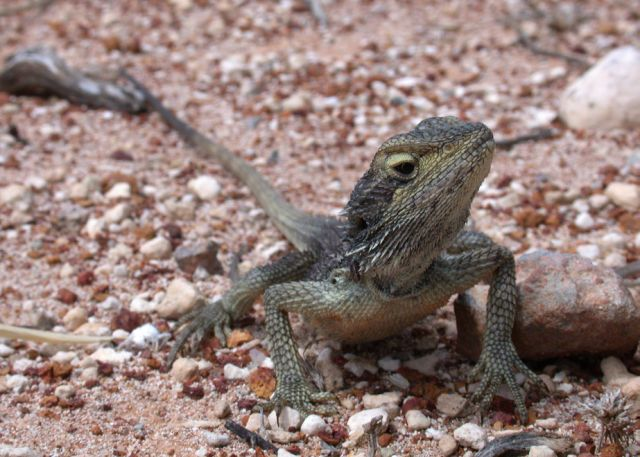
An Abrolhos dwarf bearded dragon (Pogona minor minima) on West Wallabi Island

23 terrestrial reptile species are known to occur on the islands of the Houtman Abrolhos. This relatively low biodiversity is apparently due to the homogeneity of habitat on the islands, which provide few distinct ecological niches. The most significant terrestrial reptile species are the spiny-tailed skink (Egernia stokesii stokesii) and the carpet python (Morelia spilota imbricata), both of which are listed as rare and therefore afforded special protection under the Wildlife Conservation Act 1950; and the Abrolhos dwarf bearded dragon (Pogona minor minima), a Houtman Abrolhos endemic that is listed as a Priority 4 species by the Department of Environment and Conservation. For a full list of species, see list of reptiles of the Houtman Abrolhos.

=== Amphibians ===
Specimens of the pobblebonk (Limnodynastes dorsalis) and the turtle frog (Myobatrachus gouldii) were collected from the Houtman Abrolhos during the Percy Sladen Trust Expedition of 1913 and 1915, but no amphibians have been recorded on the islands since that time.

== Marine flora ==
=== Algae ===
260 species of benthic algae have been recorded at the Houtman Abrolhos. This figure comprises 178 species of red algae (Rhodophyta), 50 species of brown algae (Phaeophyta) and 32 species of green algae (Chlorophyta). Both temperate and tropical species are present, in many cases near the northern or southern extent of their range. For a full list, see list of algae of the Houtman Abrolhos.

=== Seagrass ===
Only ten species of seagrass have been recorded at the Houtman Abrolhos. Seven of these are temperate species at or near the northern limit of their range; the other three have a tropical distribution. That there are so few tropical species may be due to periods of low sea temperatures, or the small areas of suitable habitat at the Abrolhos; alternatively it may be that more collecting effort is needed in habitats that suit tropical species. The seagrass species recorded at the Houtman Abrolhos islands are:

- Amphibolis antarctica
- Amphibolis griffithii
- Halophila decipiens
- Halophila ovalis
- Posidonia angustifolia
- Posidonia australis
- Posidonia coriacea
- Posidonia sinuosa
- Syringodium isoetifolium
- Thalassodendron pachyrhizum

== Marine fauna ==
=== Fish ===
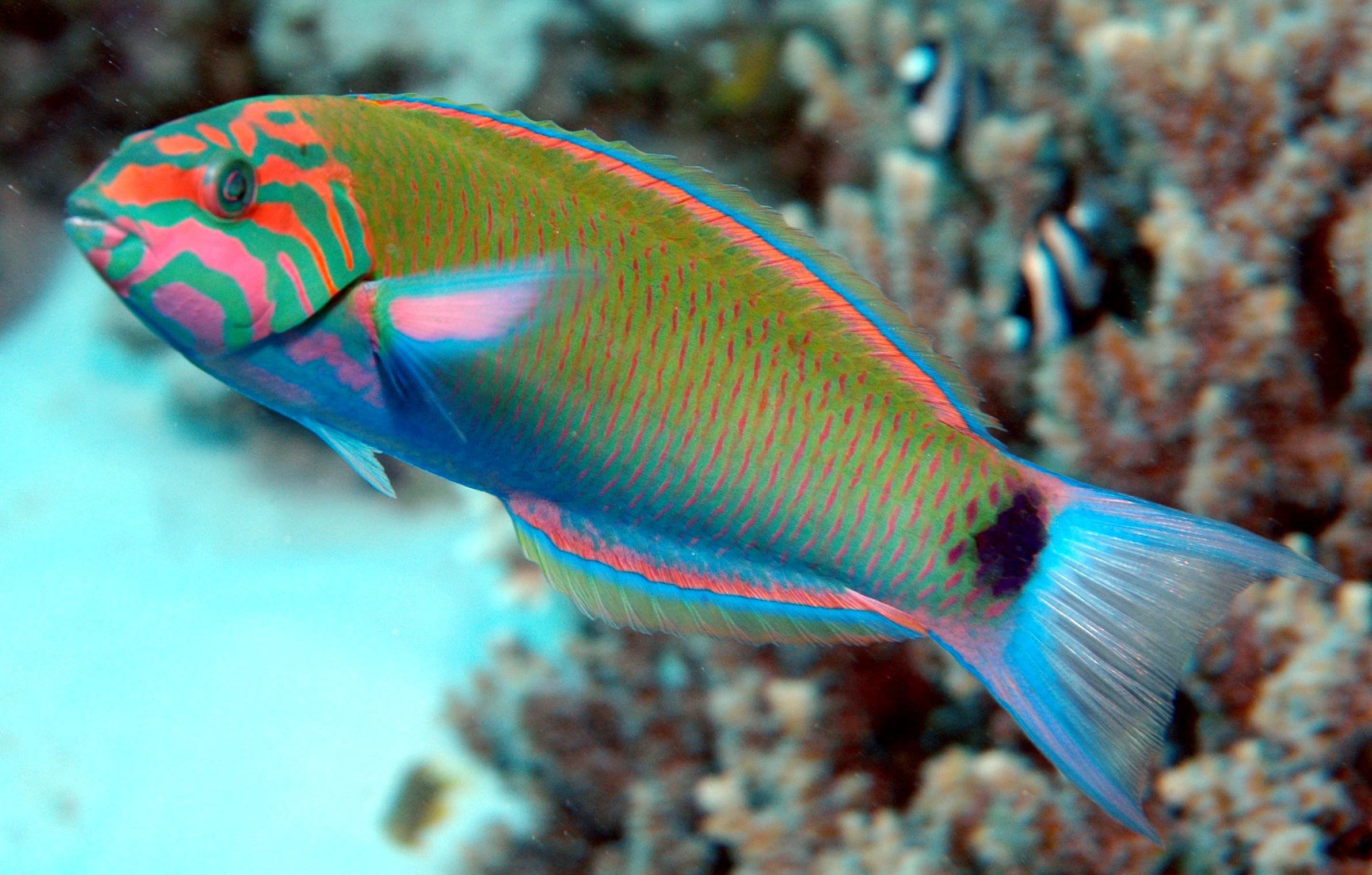
The moon wrasse, pictured here at the Great Barrier Reef, is one of the most abundant fish species at the Houtman Abrolhos

At last count, a total of 389 species of fish have been recorded from the Houtman Abrolhos. 16 species occur in very large numbers; in decreasing order of abundance, these are:

- Pomacentrus milleri (Miller's damsel)
- Scarus schlegeli (Schlegel's parrotfish)
- Stethojulis strigiventer (stripebelly wrasse)
- Coris auricularis (western king wrasse)
- Kyphosus cornelii (western buffalo bream)
- Choerodon rubescens (baldchin groper)
- Chromis westaustralis (West Australian puller)
- Thalassoma lutescens (green moon wrasse)
- Scarus ghobban (blue-barred orange parrotfish)
- Abudefduf sexfasciatus (scissortail sergeant)
- Thalassoma lunare (moon wrasse)
- Stegastes obreptus (western gregory)
- Halichoeres brownfieldi (Brownfield's wrasse)
- Amblygobius phalaena (white-barred goby)
- Asterropteryx semipunctata (starry goby)
- Anampses geographicus (scribbled wrasse)

Commercially important species include Pagrus auratus (pink snapper), Choerodon rubescens (baldchin groper), Glaucosoma hebraicum (westralian dhufish) and Plectropomus leopardus (coral trout). For a complete list of fish species recorded at the Houtman Abrolhos, see List of fishes of the Houtman Abrolhos.

About two-thirds of the total number of species are tropical in distribution, the remainder being subtropical or warm-temperate. This ratio also holds for the most abundant species, eleven of the sixteen species being tropical. On the other hand, over 70% of tropical species occur in extremely low numbers, so low in fact that they are thought not to maintain breeding populations at the Abrolhos; rather, populations are maintained by larvae carried to the islands by the Leeuwin Current from populations further north.

=== Marine mammals ===
The Houtman Abrolhos maintains a breeding population of Australian sea lions (Neophoca cinerea), probably numbering between 75 and 100. Historical data suggests numbers were previously much higher; for example, in 1727, survivors of the Zeewyk shipwreck killed over 150 sea lions in the Southern Group alone. This has led to a 1727 population estimate of between 290 and 580 animals for the entire Houtman Abrolhos. Populations apparently fell dramatically between the 1840s and the 1880s, largely due to extensive commercial sealing in the area. In addition to direct killing of the animals, it is likely that much of the mangrove habitat on the islands was cleared as fuel for trypots, and this may have affected the survival of young pups. Populations are thought to have been fairly stable for the last fifty years, although the lack of genetic diversity in the smaller population remains of concern, as does climate change.

Sea lions come ashore to rest on leeward beaches throughout the island chain, but only a small number of these "haulout sites" are used for breeding. Breeding has been observed on Serventy Island, Gilbert Island, Alexander Island, Suomi Island, Keru Island, Square Island, Stick Island, Gibson Island, Gun Island, Morley Island and Wooded Island. All but the last three of these are considered current breeding sites, and are therefore considered by the Department of Fisheries to have a high conservation value.

Little information is available on other marine mammals at the Abrolhos, as no direct research on this subject has been undertaken. Sightings of the humpback whale (Megaptera novaeangliae), followed by southern rights (Eubalaena australis), are common between April and October, when the whales are migrating. Other marine mammals sometimes sighted at the islands include pygmy Bryde's whale (Balaenoptera edeni), orca (Orcinus orca), bottlenose dolphin (Tursiops aduncus), common dolphin (Delphinus delphis), and striped dolphin (Stenella coeruleoalba).

=== Marine reptiles ===
The green turtle (Chelonia mydas) and the loggerhead turtle (Caretta caretta) both live in the waters off the Houtman Abrolhos, albeit in low numbers. Neither species breeds in the area, as water temperatures are too low.

=== Coral ===
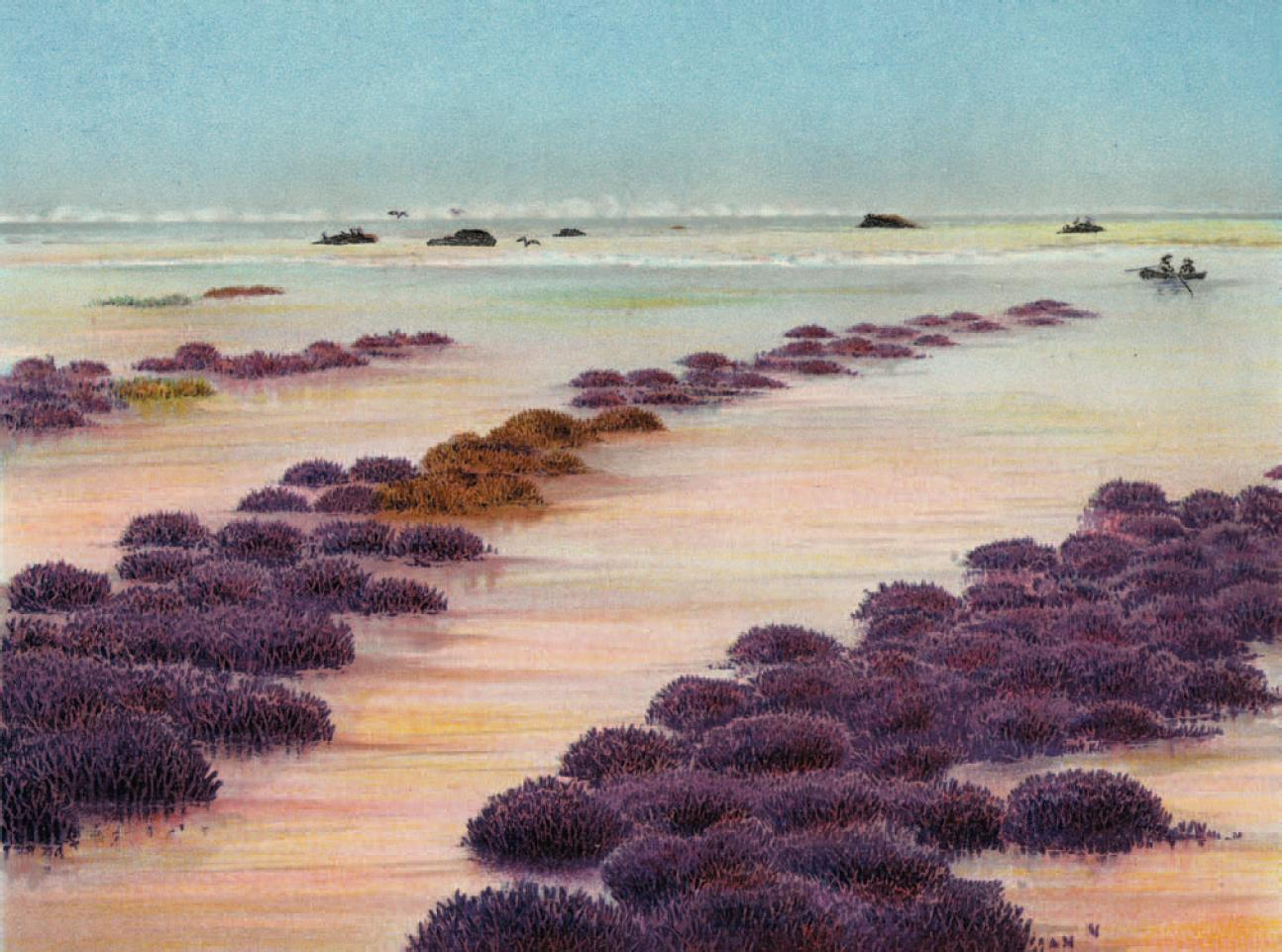
William Saville-Kent painted these corals while visiting the Houtman Abrolhos in 1894. He referred to them as Madrepora, but that name was then applied to virtually any hard coral, and the genus as now circumscribed does not occur in the Abrolhos.

The Houtman Abrolhos is unusual in having a diverse living coral reef at such a high latitude. 194 species in 50 genera have been recorded there, all but two of which are tropical. This is a surprisingly high coral diversity, considering the high latitude of the reef, and the relatively low diversity of other biota. For a full list, see list of corals of the Houtman Abrolhos.

The coral reef community at the Houtman Abrolhos is unusual in having tropical coral growing alongside and in direct competition with, temperate seaweed. As a result of this competition for light, space and nutrients, coral at the Houtman Abrolhos tends to grow more slowly and die younger than is usual. Reef production is to a large extent due to the production of carbon by coralline algae rather than by coral.

=== Crustaceans ===
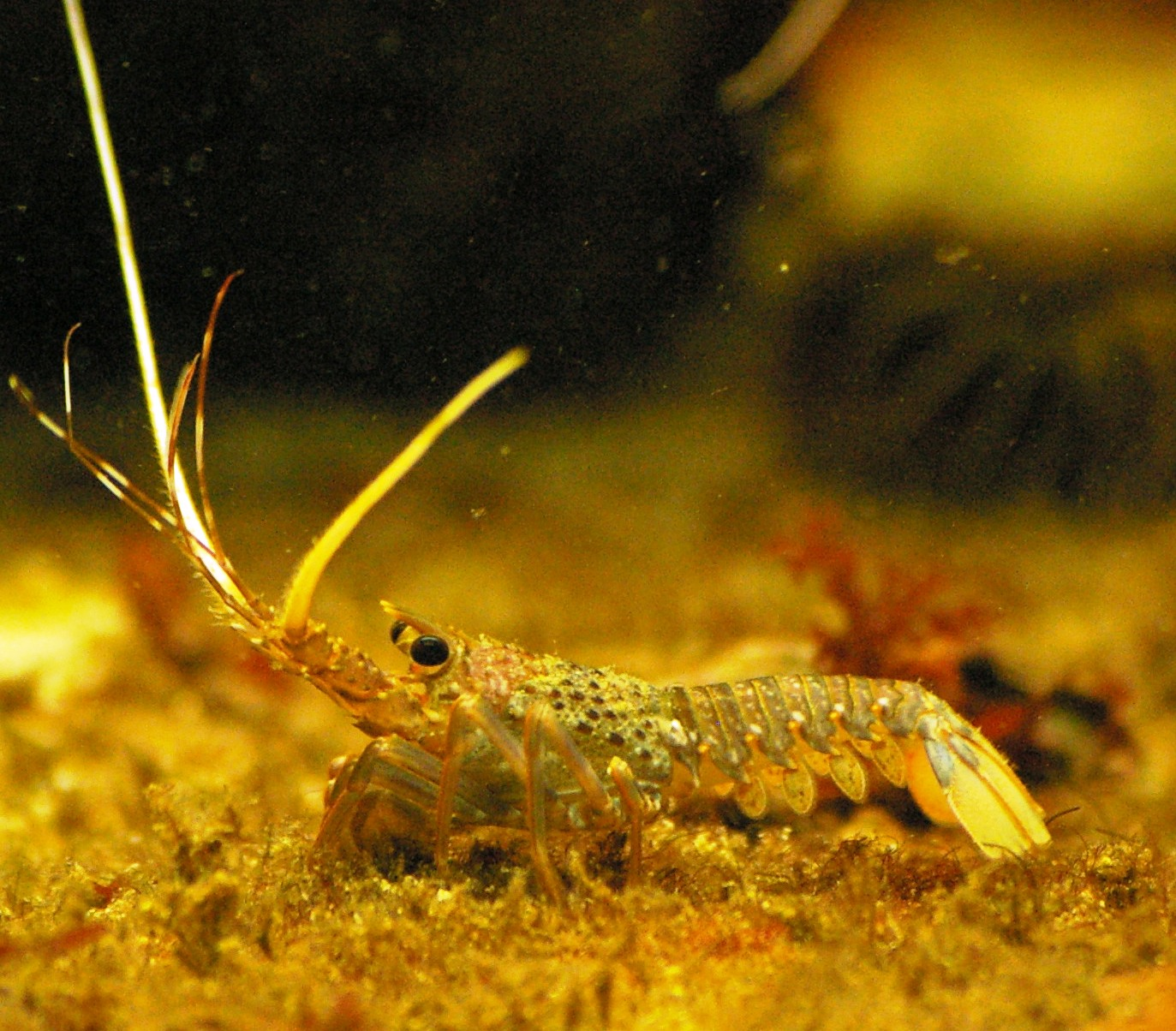
A juvenile western rock lobster at the Naturalist Marine Research Centre, Hillarys Boat Harbour, Perth

The most notable species of crustacean at the Houtman Abrolhos is the western rock lobster (Panulirus cygnus). 44 species of crab and 9 species of amphipod were recorded there by the Percy Sladen Trust Expedition of 1916.

=== Molluscs ===
492 species of marine mollusc have been recorded from the shallow waters of the Houtman Abrolhos. These are predominantly gastropods (346 species, 70%) and bivalves (124, 25%); the remaining 5% of species consist of cephalopods (14 species), chitons (5 species) and scaphopods (3 species). About two-thirds of the species have a tropical distribution, temperate species account for 20%, and the remaining 11% are endemic to Western Australia. For a full list, see List of molluscs of the Houtman Abrolhos.

The southern saucer scallop (Amusium balloti) is the only commercially important species. This occurs in sheltered areas of medium-fine sand in deep water to the north-east of the reefs; it is usually the dominant species there.

=== Echinoderms ===
Houtman Abrolhos has an extremely high diversity of echinoderms, with 172 species having been recorded there. 63% of these are tropical species, 14% are temperate, and 22% are endemic to Western Australia. None is endemic to the Houtman Abrolhos. Published surveys have not included observations of the crown-of-thorns starfish (Ananthaster planci), but individuals have occasionally been observed there. For a complete list of species, see list of echinoderms of the Houtman Abrolhos.

=== Sponges, worms and hydroids ===
The sponges of the Houtman Abrolhos are poorly studied, although 109 species of demosponge have been collected there. In the most recent survey, 77 species were collected, of which around half are probably new to science. Only two locations were surveyed in this study, so this figure is likely to represent only a small proportion of the total sponge fauna of the Houtman Abrolhos; the islands are therefore thought to harbour an extremely rich diversity of sponges. A preliminary assessment suggested that there were more temperate species than tropical, which stands in marked contrast to most other groups.

The marine worms identified at the Houtman Abrolhos include 22 species of the polychaete family Terebellidae, and 16 species of the family oligochaete family Tubificidae. For a list of species, see list of worms of the Houtman Abrolhos.

A total of 38 hydroid species have been collected at the Houtman Abrolhos. 34 of these are leptothecates, the remainder being anthoathecates. 92% of the species attach to temperate algae, the others to coral rubble. For a list of species, see list of hydroids of the Houtman Abrolhos.

== Human uses ==
=== Fishing and tourism ===
Fresh water has always been a significant constraint on any permanent settlement. Aside from the early castaways noted above, the Islands have only had a small seasonal population of fishermen. The present fishermen all have permanent residence elsewhere, mainly in Geraldton, but their island shacks are used as a base during the season. For example, North Island has a seasonal camp for western rock lobster fishers, with individual moorings and simple dwellings. During lobster season, which runs from 15 March to 30 June, the island hosts up to 130 people. The camp is serviced by a carrier boat, the North Islander, which visits the island every three days, bringing supplies and taking out the catch and any domestic waste.

Tourists are not allowed to camp, and the conservation designation of the Island group forbids any real expansion in human occupation.

==== Western rock lobster ====
The islands are the centre of the western rock lobster fishery, the largest single-species fishery in Western Australia.

==== Saucer scallops ====
After Shark Bay, the Houtman Abrolhos supports Western Australia's second largest saucer scallop fishery. This fishery is managed under the Abrolhos Islands and Mid West Trawl Limited Entry Fishery Notice 1993. Only 17 licences have been issued, and no more will be made available, as the saucer scallop is considered fully exploited. Licensees are constrained to operate only during scallop season, which generally runs from 1 April to 30 June, and are also subject to restrictions on gear design, boat size and crew numbers.

Scallop fishers mainly operate east of the Houtman Abrolhos and between the island groups, in waters deeper than 30 metres (98 ft). Activity is targeted at sheltered areas of bare sand, where scallops tend to settle. Catches vary greatly from year to year; from 2001 to 2003, for example, the total annual catch totalled 1,182, 195 and 5,840 tonnes or 2.61, 0.43 and 12.87 million pounds (whole weight) respectively. This variability is apparently related to the strength of the Leeuwin Current, as strong current is correlated with low scallop recruitment.

The total value of the fishery in 2003 was A$19.6 million, although this figure includes a small prawn fishery operating out of Port Gregory. Most of the catch is frozen and exported to Asia.

==== Finfish ====
The Houtman Abrolhos is the site of some wetlining activity.

=== Aquaculture ===
The Department of Fisheries have issued a number of licences to cultivate black-lip pearl oysters in the Abrolhos. The first recipient of a license was Abrolhos Pearls in 1996. By 2000, another license had been issued and four more applications had been received. A year later, there were 10 square kilometres (3.9 sq mi) licensed for the culture of pearl oysters in the Abrolhos, of which about 21% was actually in use, carrying over 210,000 shell. Six licences had been issued by 2002, and by 2007 that number had grown to eight.

95% of the pearl aquaculture is carried out in the Pelsaert Group. Most licenses are over areas of sand, but some areas contain small amounts of coral reef. The colour of the pearls produced is quite different from that of Pacific black pearls, and this is considered a potential marketing tool.

In addition to pearl aquaculture, a pilot sea cage finfish farm was licensed in 2004, although as of 2007 the license had not been exercised. Interest has also been expressed in the culture of live rock and coral for the aquarium industry. The Department of Fisheries has identified a number of species as having potential for aquaculture in the Abrolhos, including the Shark Bay pearl oyster (Pinctada albina), the maxima clam (Tridacna maxima), rock oysters (Saccostrea sp.), the saucer scallop (Amusium balloti), the western rock lobster, and a number of species of finfish, most of which are filter feeders.

=== Mineral exploration ===
Petroleum exploration wells were drilled in Abrolhos waters in the 1960s and 1970s, but were capped and abandoned. The Abrolhos was amongst the areas released for further exploration in 2002.

=== Recreation ===
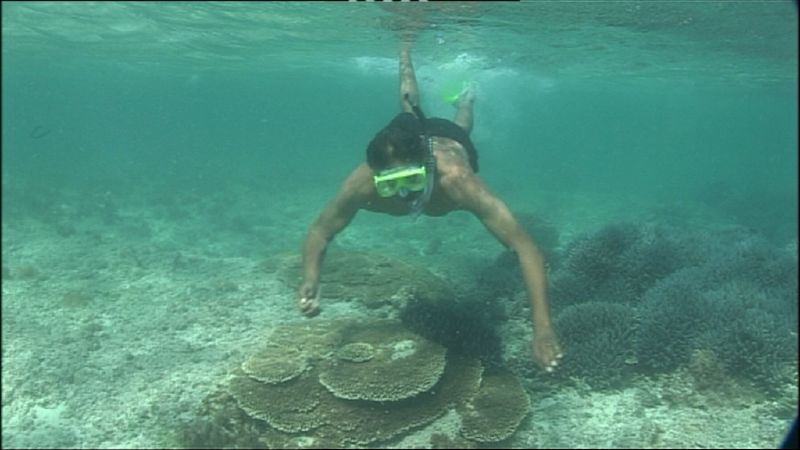
Ernie Dingo dives on a coral reef at the Houtman Abrolhos, during shooting for the Australian television show The Great Outdoors.

The Abrolhos provides snorkelling, diving and deep sea fishing in the world, along with some of Australia's most significant historical sights, such as the shipwreck of the Batavia.

Although an important tourist destination, the tourists are not allowed to stay overnight.

== Cultural references ==
The majority of cultural references to the Houtman Abrolhos relate to the islands' shipwrecks, particularly the Batavia. The events surrounding the loss of the Batavia is one of the most celebrated episodes in Australian popular history; in the words of Henrietta Drake-Brockman:

In Australia, poets and schoolboys, artists and historians, have been inspired for half a century by the tragedy of an ancient shipwreck, a disaster that piled horror upon horror yet revealed so much of human fortitude as to invite comparison with the epic tales of Greece.

The story has spawned a massive body of literature, both fiction and non-fiction, as well as numerous works in other media.

Other shipwrecks, notably Zeewijk (also spelled Zeewyk), have also become the subject of books and other works. Other cultural references to the Houtman Abrolhos are rare. By far the best known book on it is Malcolm Uren's Sailormen's ghosts: The Abrolhos islands in three hundred years of romance, history, and adventure. First published in 1940, this book saw numerous editions published in the 1940s, and was even republished in 1980 as a "West Australian classic". In it, Uren tells both the history of the islands and the story of his own visit to the islands.

Other books include William Bede Christie's 1909 Christmas on the briny: the innocents abroad, or, a holiday trip to the Abrolhos islands, Deborah Lisson's 1991 The Devil's Own, and Alison Louise Wright's 1998 Abrolhos Islands Conversations. The latter, a book of interviews and portraits of the people of the Abrolhos, won the Special Award in the 1999 Western Australian Premier's Book Awards.

The islands featured in the first episode of Surfing the Menu, an eight-part food and travel series produced for the ABC in 2003, and the following year were featured on Getaway, Australia's longest-running and most popular holiday and travel television programme. They were the subject of a motion picture entitled Eye opener, published by The Film Centre WA in 1981, and of a piece of classical music entitled Abrolhos: A ceremonial overture, written by William Stewart in 1988 under commission to the Geraldton Town Council.

In April 2019 the Houtman Abrolhos became the site of the failure of reportedly one of Australia's biggest drug smuggling operations, worth $73 million.

In 2020 a Western Australian man briefly established the Houtman Abrolhos Micro Nation, based on Uncle Margie Island. The self-declared 'prince' represented himself in the four-day trial in 2023 and relied on a bevy of pseudolegal claims to challenge the Department of Primary Industries & Regional Development (DPIRD).

== See also ==
- List of islands in the Houtman Abrolhos
- List of islands of Australia

== General references ==
- Markey, K. L., Abdo, D. A., Evans, S. N., Bosserelle, C. (2016). Keeping it Local: Dispersal Limitations of Coral Larvae to the High Latitude Coral Reefs of the Houtman Abrolhos Islands. PLos ONE 11(1).
