= List of worms of the Houtman Abrolhos =

The marine worms identified at the Houtman Abrolhos comprise 22 species of the polychaete family Terebellidae, and 16 species of the family oligochaete family Tubificidae.

Terebellidae
Tubificidae
- Pseudothelepus binara
- Thelepus robustus
- Amphitritides ithya
- Arranooba booromia
- Eupolymnia koorangia
- Lanice bidewa
- Lanice sinata
- Lanicides attenuata
- Lanicides lacuna
- Lanicides physa
- Lanicola lobata
- Longicarpus modestus
- Loimia ochracea
- Neoleprea booligal
- Nicolea amnis
- Pista kimberliensis
- Pista violacea
- Pseudoproclea australis
- Spinosphaera cowarrie
- Terebella muliarrus
- Terebella tantabiddycreekensis
- Tyira owensi
- Aktedrilus fissilis
- Aktedrilus longetubularis
- Aktedrilus parviprostratus
- Aktedrilus parvithecatus
- Aktedrilus triplex
- Bathydrilus edwardsi
- Heterodrilus decipiens
- Limnodriloides agnes
- Limnodriloides australis
- Limnodriloides gossensis
- Limnodriloides vermithecatus
- Olavius abrolhosensis
- Olavius patriciae
- Pectinodrilus multiplex
- Pirodriloides albanensis
- Smithsonidrilus nimius
