= Acacia didyma =

Scientific classification
- Kingdom: Plantae
- Clade: Tracheophytes
- Clade: Angiosperms
- Clade: Eudicots
- Clade: Rosids
- Order: Fabales
- Family: Fabaceae
- Subfamily: Caesalpinioideae
- Clade: Mimosoid clade
- Genus: Acacia
- Species: A. didyma

Binomial name
- Acacia didyma A.R.Chapm. & Maslin.
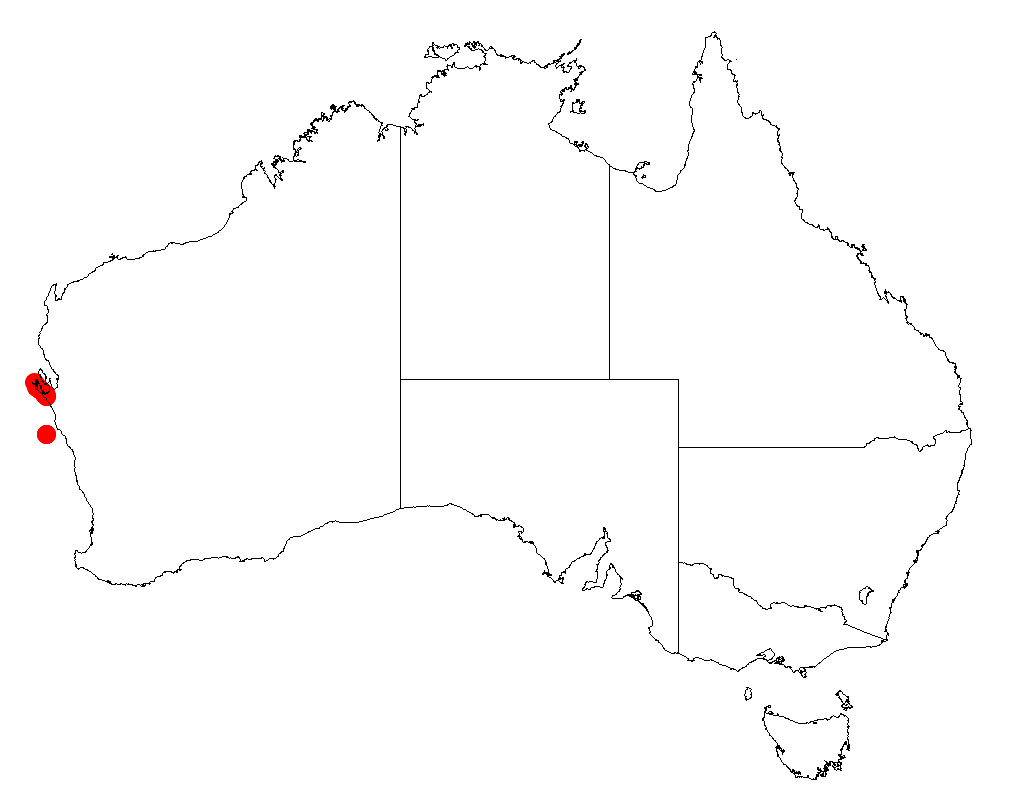
- Occurrence data from AVH

Synonyms
- Acacia aff. bivenosa (A.R.Chapman 601); Racosperma didymum (A.R.Chapm. & Maslin) Pedley; Acacia bivenosa auct. non DC.: Chapman, A.R. & Maslin, B.R. in Orchard, A.E. & Wilson, A.J.G. (ed.) (2001), Flora of Australia p.p.; Acacia elliptica auct. non A.Cunn. ex Benth.: Bentham, G. in Hooker, W.J. (1842) p.p.; Acacia xanthina auct. non Benth.: Chapman, A.R. & Maslin, B.R. in Orchard, A.E. & Wilson, A.J.G. (ed.) (2001), Flora of Australia p.p.

Species of legume

Acacia didyma is a species of flowering plant in the family Fabaceae and is endemic to the far west of Western Australia. It is a dense, rounded shrub or tree with circular to widely elliptic phyllodes, spherical heads of golden yellow flowers and strongly curved to coiled, leathery to crusty pods.

== Description ==
Acacia didyma is a dense, rounded shrub or tree that typically grows to a height of 1.5–4 m (4 ft 11 in – 13 ft 1 in) and has branchlets that are glabrous and more or less covered with a whitish powdery bloom. The phyllodes are circular to widely elliptic, 20–50 mm (0.79–1.97 in) long and 15–40 mm (0.59–1.57 in) wide, glaucous with two to four veins on the widest phyllodes and two glands. The flowers are borne in four to twelve spherical heads in axils on peduncles 5–10 mm (0.20–0.39 in) long, each head with about 20 golden yellow flowers. Flowering has been recorded in May and from August to October, and the pods are strongly curved to coiled, leathery to crusty, up to 100 mm (3.9 in) long, 12–15 mm (0.47–0.59 in) wide and often covered with a whitish powdery bloom. The seeds are widely oblong, about 4.5 mm (0.18 in) long and shiny dark brown to black with a large aril.

== Taxonomy ==
Acacia didyma was first formally described by Alex Chapman and Bruce Maslin in the journal Nuytsia from specimens collected by Chapman 3.6 km (2.2 mi) west of the Tamala Homestead near Shark Bay in 1988. The specific epithet (didyma) means 'paired', referring to the peduncles.

== Distribution and habitat ==
This species of wattle grows in scattered locations near Shark Bay including on Dirk Hartog Island and Carrarang and Tamala Stations and on East Wallabi Island in the Houtman Abrolhos group where it grows in sand over limestone on sand dunes and limestone ridges in the Geraldton Sandplains and Yalgoo bioregions in the far west of Western Australia.

== Conservation status ==
Acacia didyma is listed as "not threatened" by the Government of Western Australia Department of Parks and Wildlife.

== See also ==
- List of Acacia species
