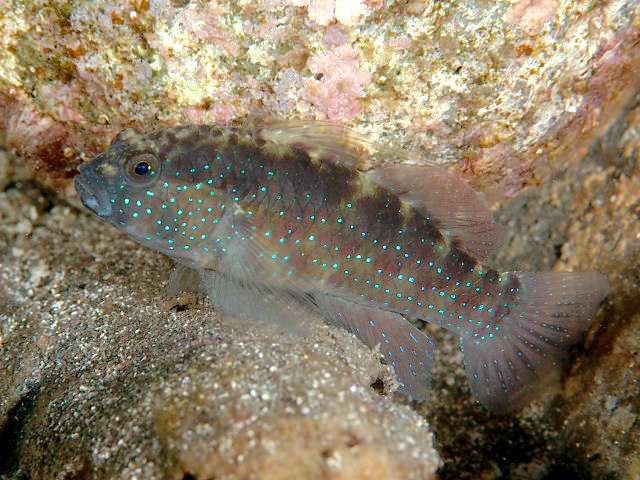
- Asterropteryx semipunctata

Scientific classification
- Kingdom: Animalia
- Phylum: Chordata
- Class: Actinopterygii
- Order: Gobiiformes
- Family: Gobiidae
- Subfamily: Gobiinae
- Genus: Asterropteryx; Rüppell, 1830

Type species
- Asterropterix semipunctatus Rüppell, 1830

= Asterropteryx =

Genus of fish

Asterropteryx is a genus of fish in the family Gobiidae found in the Indian and Pacific Ocean.

== Species ==
There are currently 9 recognized species in this genus:

- Asterropteryx atripes Shibukawa & T. Suzuki, 2002 (Yano's starrygoby)
- Asterropteryx bipunctata G. R. Allen & Munday, 1995 (Orange-spotted starrygoby)
- Asterropteryx ensifera (Bleeker, 1874) (Miller's starrygoby)
- Asterropteryx ovata Shibukawa & T. Suzuki, 2007 (Oval-spot starrygoby)
- Asterropteryx profunda G. R. Allen & Erdmann, 2016
- Asterropteryx semipunctata Rüppell, 1830 (Starry goby)
- Asterropteryx senoui Shibukawa & T. Suzuki, 2007 (Senou's starrygoby)
- Asterropteryx spinosa (Goren, 1981) (Eye-bar starrygoby)
- Asterropteryx striata G. R. Allen & Munday, 1995
