= New Caledonian buttonquail =

Conservation status
- Critically endangered, possibly extinct (IUCN 3.1)

Scientific classification
- Kingdom: Animalia
- Phylum: Chordata
- Class: Aves
- Order: Charadriiformes
- Family: Turnicidae
- Genus: Turnix
- Species: T. novaecaledoniae

Binomial name
- Turnix novaecaledoniae Ogilvie-Grant, 1889

Species of bird

The New Caledonian buttonquail (Turnix novaecaledoniae) is a species of bird in the family Turnicidae. It is endemic to New Caledonia. It previously was considered a subspecies of the painted buttonquail.

Its natural habitats are dry savanna, subtropical or tropical dry shrubland, and subtropical or tropical dry lowland grassland.
