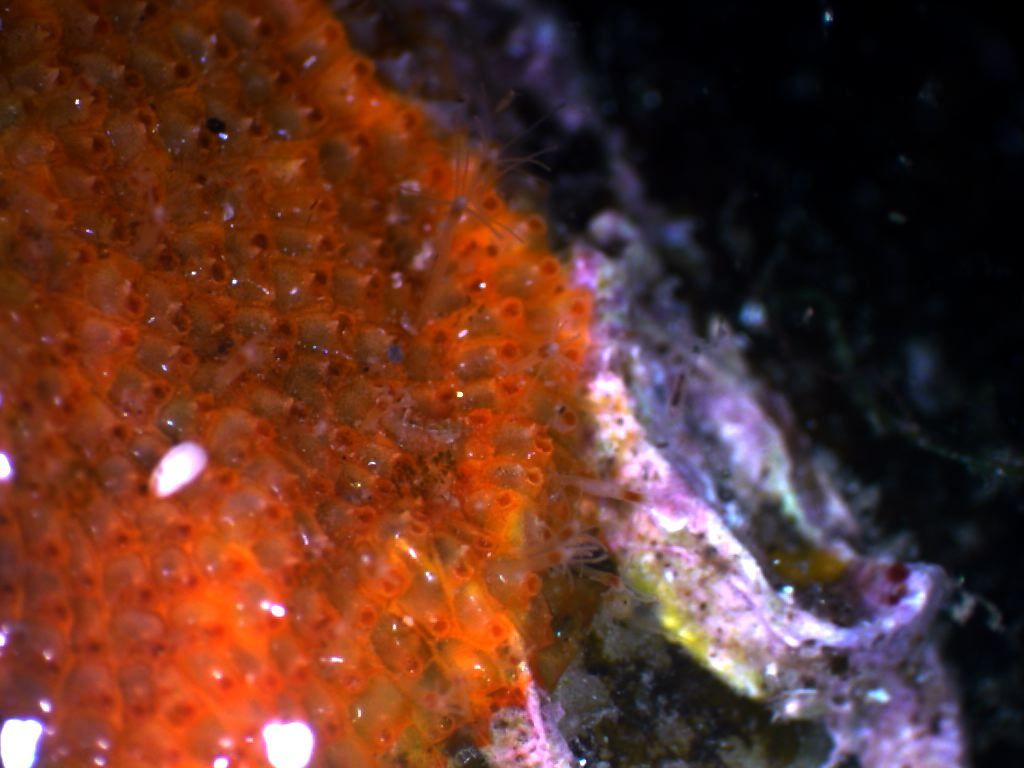
- Perarella schneideri

Scientific classification
- Kingdom: Animalia
- Phylum: Cnidaria
- Class: Hydrozoa
- Order: Anthoathecata
- Family: Cytaeididae

= Cytaeididae =

Family of hydrozoans

Cytaeididae is a family of cnidarians belonging to the order Anthoathecata.

Genera:

- Cytaeis Eschscholtz, 1829
- Paracytaeis Bouillon, 1978
- Perarella Stechow, 1922
- Stylactella Haeckel, 1889
