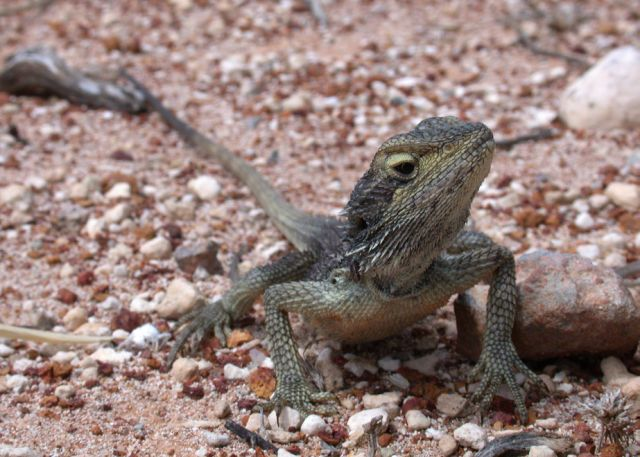
- P. m. minima on West Wallabi Island

Conservation status
- Critically Endangered (IUCN 3.1)

Scientific classification
- Kingdom: Animalia
- Phylum: Chordata
- Class: Reptilia
- Order: Squamata
- Suborder: Iguania
- Family: Agamidae
- Genus: Pogona
- Species: P. minor
- Subspecies: P. m. minima

Trinomial name
- Pogona minor minima Loveridge 1933

= Pogona minor minima =

Subspecies of lizard

Pogona minor minima, the Abrolhos bearded dragon or Abrolhos dwarf bearded dragon, is an agamid lizard found only on islands at Houtman Abrolhos, and commonly named for this location. It is closely related to other bearded dragons found in Western Australia.

The size of the dragon is smaller than related subspecies, no more than 360 mm long (115 mm snout-vent length). It occurs in sandy habitats or outcrops of limestone. The range is restricted to three islands of the Wallabi Group: North Island, East Wallabi Island, and West Wallabi Island. The distribution range of this subspecies is around 80 km from the mainland and its near relations.
