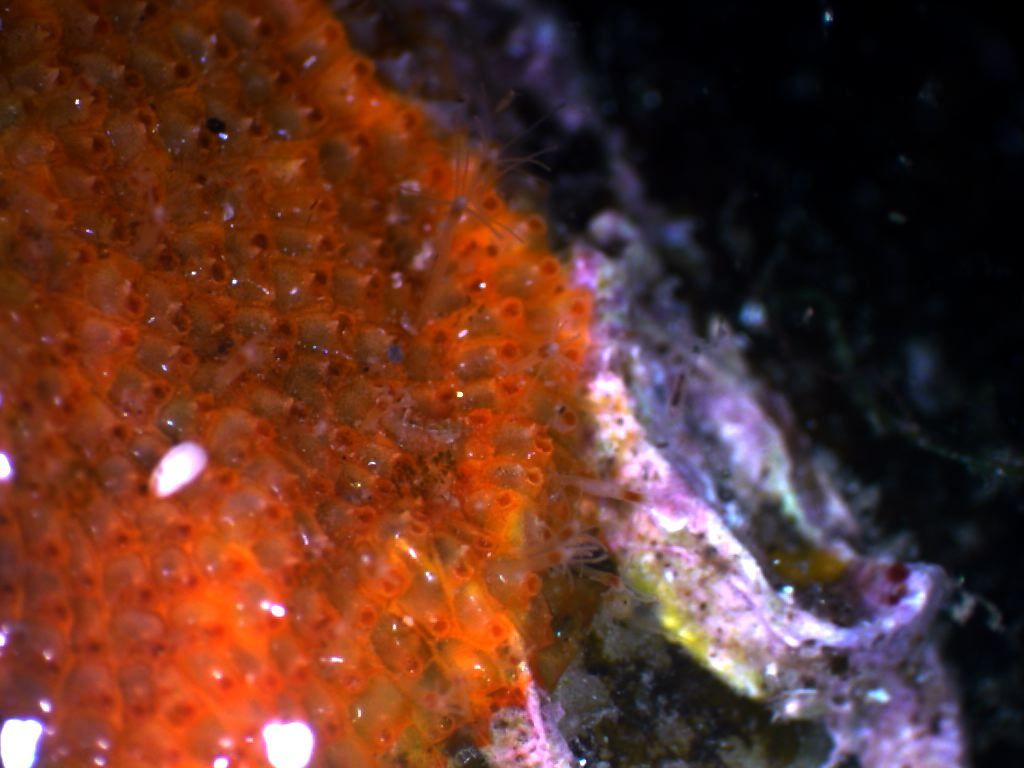
- Perarella schneideri

Scientific classification
- Domain: Eukaryota
- Kingdom: Animalia
- Phylum: Cnidaria
- Class: Hydrozoa
- Order: Anthoathecata
- Family: Cytaeididae
- Genus: Perarella; Stechow, 1922

= Perarella =

Genus of hydrozoans

Perarella is a genus of hydrozoans belonging to the family Cytaeididae.

The species of this genus are found in Europe, northwestern Africa, Antarctica.

Species:

- Perarella abyssicola (Haeckel, 1889)
- Perarella affinis (Jäderholm, 1903)
- Perarella clavata (Jäderholm, 1905)
- Perarella fallax (Broch, 1914)
- Perarella parastichopae Hirohito, 1988
- Perarella propagulata Bavestrello, 1987
- Perarella schneideri (Motz-Kossowska, 1905)
- Perarella spongicola (Haeckel, 1889)
