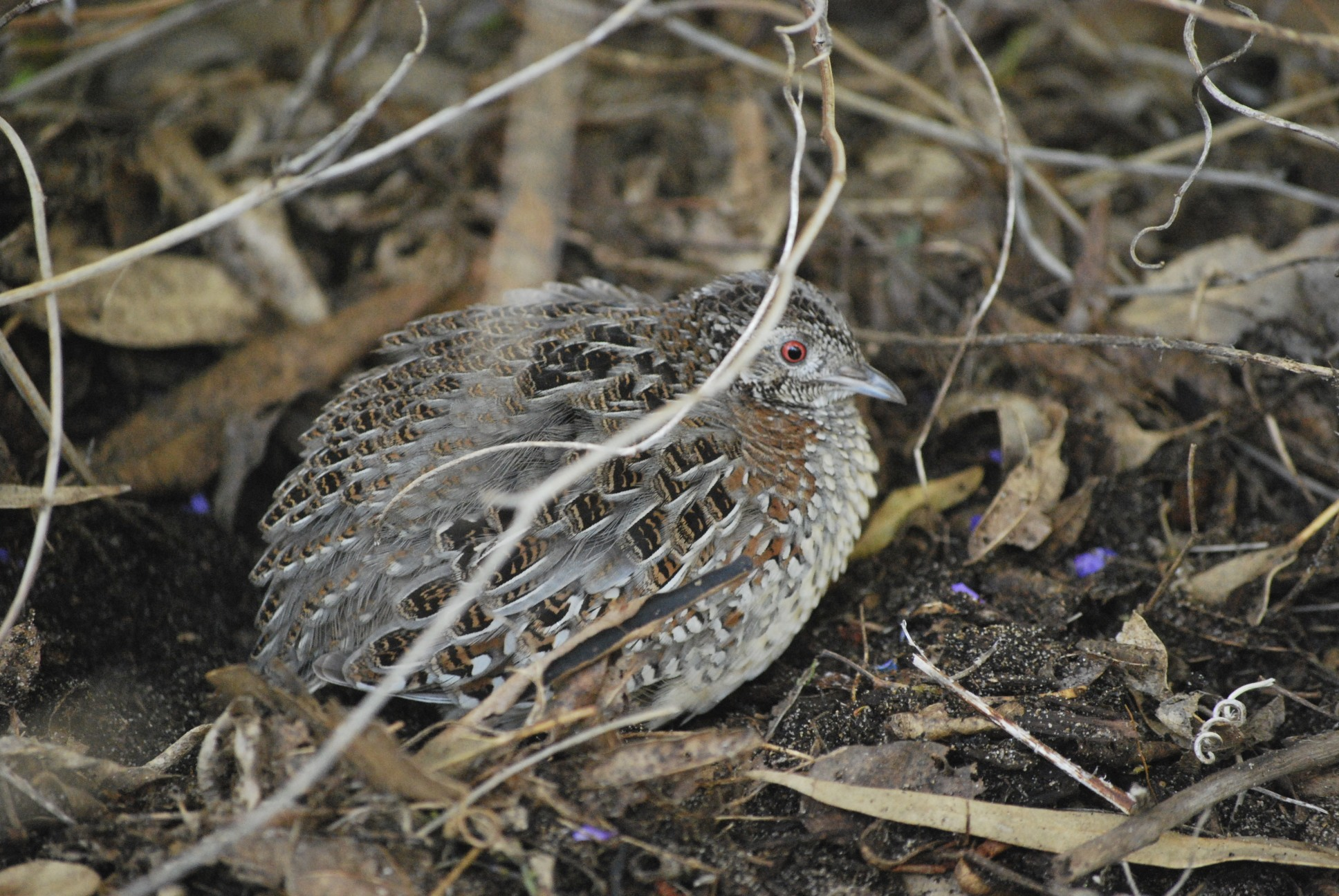

Conservation status
- Vulnerable (EPBC Act)

Scientific classification
- Kingdom: Animalia
- Phylum: Chordata
- Class: Aves
- Order: Charadriiformes
- Family: Turnicidae
- Genus: Turnix
- Species: T. varius
- Subspecies: T. v. scintillans

Trinomial name
- Turnix varius scintillans (Gould, 1845)

= Abrolhos painted buttonquail =

Abrolhos Painted Button-quail

Subspecies of bird

The Abrolhos Painted-Buttonquail (Turnix varius scintillans) is a subspecies of the painted buttonquail endemic to the Houtman Abrolhos. It was formerly common on North Island but is now presumed extinct there and also occurs on other islands of the Wallabi Group, namely East Wallabi, West Wallabi, Seagull and Pigeon Islands.

== Taxonomy ==
The first recorded sighting of the bird by Europeans was during the third voyage of HMS Beagle. On 22 May 1840, the crew of the ship landed at North Island, which John Lort Stokes described thus:

"The island was about a mile across, and nearly circular. It was surrounded by a range of hills, with a flat in the centre, covered with coarse grass, where a great many quails were flushed, affording good sport, but not a single wallaby."

Five years later, the subspecies was formally published by John Gould.

== Description ==
It lives amongst dunes and sand flats covered with Spinifex, saltbush and samphire, and avoids areas of limestone pavement. It obtains food such as insects and seeds by scratching in the surface soil, but also will collect scraps it can find. It breeds from April to October. Its nest is a scrape in loose soil about ten centimetres wide and two centimetres deep, beneath vegetation. The species matures at one year and has a longevity of nine years.

== Conservation status ==
In 2003 it was assessed as "fauna which is rare, or likely to become extinct" under the WA Wildlife Conservation Act 1950. Islands where it breeds are considered to have a high conservation value. Rats and cats have been introduced to the ecosystem which may pose a threat to the population.

A 2018 study ranked it fifth in a list of Australian birds most likely to go extinct.

As of July 2022 the subspecies is listed as "vulnerable" under the federal EPBC Act (last updated 16 July 2000, due for reassessment 30 October 2022), and endangered under the Biodiversity Conservation Act 2016 (WA).
