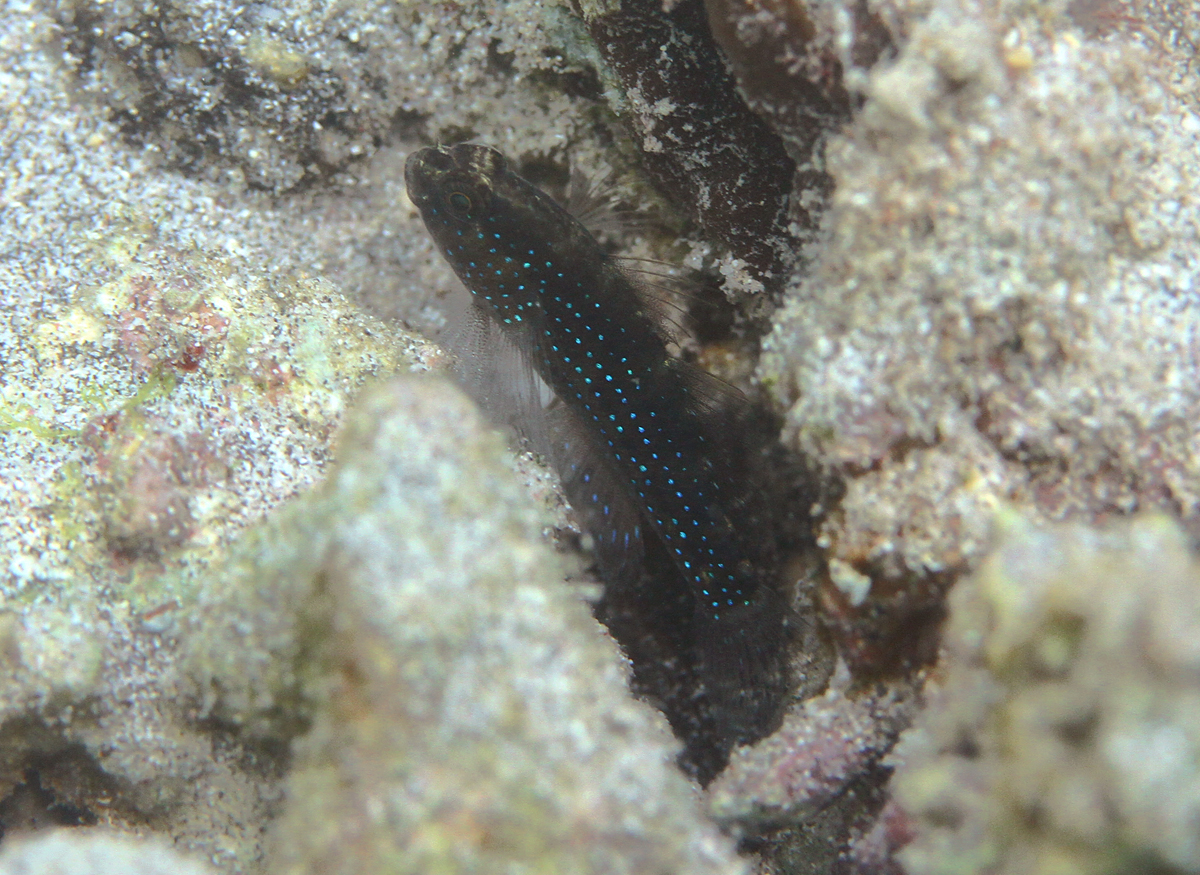

Scientific classification
- Kingdom: Animalia
- Phylum: Chordata
- Class: Actinopterygii
- Order: Gobiiformes
- Family: Gobiidae
- Genus: Asterropteryx
- Species: A. semipunctata

Binomial name
- Asterropteryx semipunctata Rüppell, 1830

= Asterropteryx semipunctata =

Species of fish

Asterropteryx semipunctata, the starry goby is a species of true goby from the family Gobiidae. It is a widespread species, found from the Red Sea and Persian Gulf to Hawaii and the Line Islands, north to Japan and south to Lord Howe Island, as well as Western Australia and New South Wales. It is found on reef rocks covered in algae and among the rubble of the inner flats and turbid lagoons. It uses burrows and holes in the reef to hide in and it feeds on small benthic invertebrates. This species is found either living a solitary life but has also been recorded in small groups. It is the type species of the genus Asterropteryx.
