= Charles du Boisguehenneuc =

French Navy officer (1740–1778)

Charles Marc du Boisguehenneuc (1740 – 1778 in Robuste) was a French Navy officer. He took part in the First voyage of Kerguelen and served in the War of American Independence. Boisguehenneuc Bay was named in his honour.

== Biography ==
Du Boisguehenneuc was cousin to Saint Aloüarn.

Du Boisguehenneuc served as first officer on Gros Ventre, under Saint Aloüarn, and took part in the First voyage of Kerguelen. In 1771, Saint Aloüarn was sick, and Du Boisguehenneuc took command of Gros Ventre for the first part of the expedition, consisting in sailing to India along the new route proposed by Grenier. Gros Ventre and Fortune then sailed South and discovered the Kerguelen Islands on 13 February 1772, and Du Boisguehenneuc went ashore on a boat and claimed the land for France.

He returned to France on Indien.

== Sources and references ==
Notes

Citations

Bibliography

- Taillemite, Étienne (1999). Marins français à la découverte du monde : de Jacques Cartier à Dumont d'Urville. France: Fayard. ISBN 2-213-60114-3. OCLC 937819780.
- Stanbury, Myra (1999). "Saint Alouarn and the French Annexation of Western Australia, 1772" (PDF). Report on 1998 Overseas Research.

External links

- Archives nationales (2011). Fonds Marine. Dossiers individuels (2ème partie). Répertoire numérique détaillé de la sous-série Marine C/7. Pierrefitte-sur-Seine.
- Scientific Committee on Antarctic Research. "Boisguehenneuc Bay". Composite Gazetteer of Antarctica.
- Mon Australie. "Instructions secrètes de Louis XV à Yves de Kerguelen". Mon Australie.
