= Alexis-Marie de Rochon =

French physicist (1741–1817)

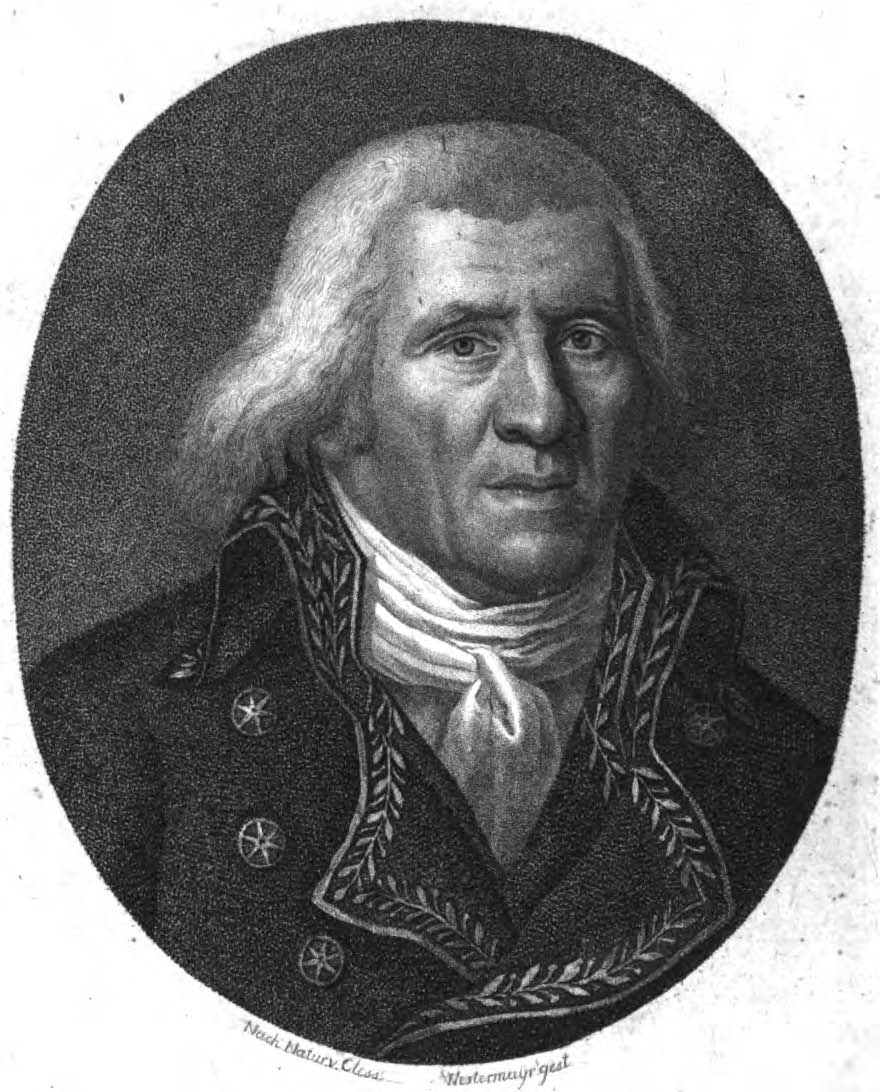
- Born: 21 February 1741; Brest, France
- Died: 5 April 1817 (aged 76); Paris, France
- Known for: inventing the Rochon prism
- Scientific career
- Fields: astronomy physics

Alexis-Marie de Rochon, known as Abbé Rochon, was born in Brest, France on 21 February 1741, and died in Paris on 5 April 1817. He was a French astronomer, physicist and traveller. He worked on lens design and crystal optics, inventing the Rochon prism.

== Biography ==
In 1769, Rochon was part of an expedition under Ensign Grenier to find new, quicker maritime routes between Isle de France and India. On 30 May 1769, the expedition departed, with the corvettes Heure du Berger, under Grenier, and Vert-Galant, under Commander La Fontaine. They were bound for Saint-Brandon, where they arrived on 2 June. They then sailed on the 5th Nazareth bank, then on Saya de Malha bank on 5 June, and continued North before sailing West to reach Seychelles, arriving at Mahé on 14 June. they then sailed to Praslin, spending the night of 14 there, and departed on 15. They sailed through the Maldives and arrived at Malabar coast on 29 July, and eventually at Pondichéry on 6 August. From there, Grenier sailed to Sumatra, arriving there on 9 September. He continued to Diego Garcia, where he arrived on 24, and returned to Port Louis on 6 October.

Grenier's new route allowed a one-month journey to India, dramatically cutting on the three-month route then known, which made a large detour South before sailing North-West. Grenier was also the first to survey the Seychelles. Publication of the route yielded a polemic between Grenier and Rochon, but the Académie de Marine ended up backing Grenier.

On 1 May 177, Rochon departed France on the 56-gun Berryer, under Lieutenant Kerguelen, bound for Isle de France. The new expedition made new surveys of Grenier's route, and found in Grenier's favour.

== Notes, citations, and references ==
Notes

Citations

References

- Doneaud Du Plan, Alfred (1878). Histoire de l'Académie de marine (in French). Paris: Berger-Levrault.
- Martin-Allanic, Jean-Étienne (1964). Bougainville Navigateur et les Découvertes de son Temps (in French). Paris: Presses Universitaires de France. ISBN 9787240006214. OCLC 729759706.
- Taillemite, Étienne (2002). Dictionnaire des Marins français. Tallandier. p. 224. ISBN 2-84734-008-4. OCLC 606770323.
