= First voyage of Kerguelen =

1770s French mapping expedition to Indian Ocean

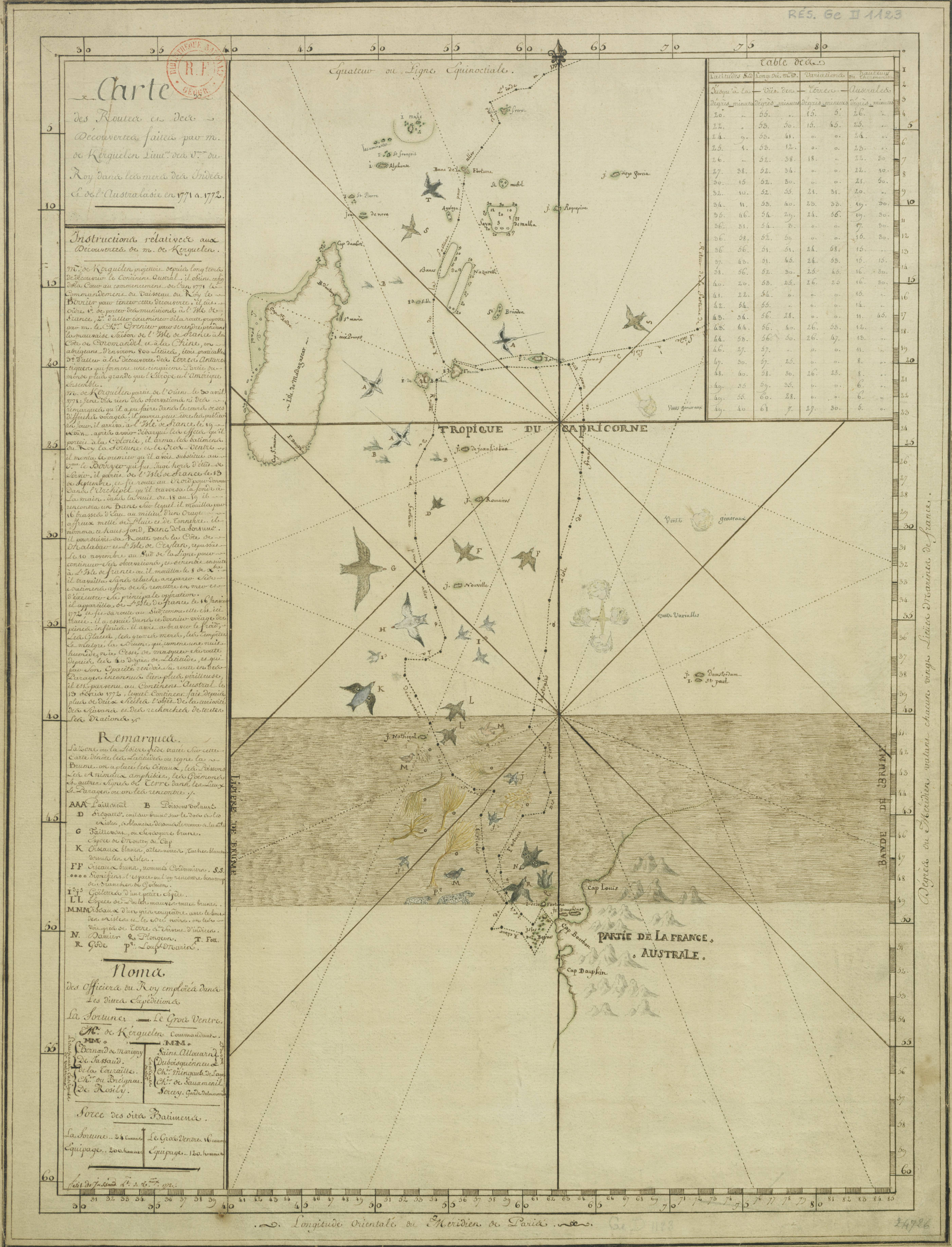
Map of the expedition

The fluyts Fortune and Gros Ventre under Lieutenant Yves-Joseph de Kerguelen-Trémarec conducted an expedition of the French Navy to the southern Indian Ocean in 1772. The aims of the expedition were to survey recently discovered sea routes between Isle de France (now Mauritius) and India, to seek the postulated Terra Australis Incognita (undiscovered Southern land), and to explore Australia.

After successfully completing the first part of the mission, Fortune and Gros Ventre sailed south, and discovered the Kerguelen Islands. After the two ships were separated in the fog, Fortune aborted her mission and returned to Isle de France, where the news of the discovery led to vastly overenthusiastic descriptions of the new lands. Meanwhile, Gros Ventre continued on her mission, reaching Australia and surveying part of its northern coast before returning to Isle de France.

== Conception ==
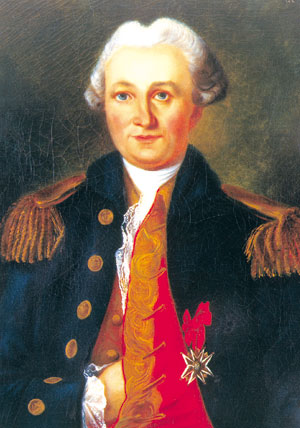
A portrait of Yves-Joseph de Kerguelen-Trémarec

In early 1770, Kerguelen had drafted a project to bring Ahutoru back to Tahiti, and take the opportunity to explore the Southern Pacific Ocean, in search of a Terra Australis Incognita. His proposal was rejected for financial reasons. In September 1770, Kerguelen renewed his proposal, but international tensions caused another rejection.

In January 1771, Kerguelen made a third attempt, this time channeling his ideas though Terray, Aiguillon and Clugny. Kerguelen wanted to pursue the voyages of Bouvet de Lozier, in search of a large continent that he expected to exist between the 45th parallel and the South Pole.

In April, Kerguelen was given orders to sail to Isle de France with Rochon to survey Grenier's newly proposed maritime route to India. He was then to sail South in search of austral territories, follow the new putative coast up to Cape Circoncision, and sail on to France via Río de la Plata.

== Voyage ==
On 1 May 1771, Lieutenant Kerguelen departed France on the 56-gun Berryer, bound for Isle de France (now Mauritius). Berryer arrived at Port-Louis on 20 August. Kerguelen met Poivre and Marion Dufresne. Rochon also spent time with Poivre, as well as with Ahutoru, discussing the floras of Tahiti. Poivre suggested Rochon be transferred to Marion's expedition, but governor Desroches refused.

On 13 September, Kerguelen departed Isle de France with the 24-gun fluyt Fortune and the 16-gun Gros Ventre to survey Grenier's route. (Note: Rochon had stayed at Isle de France in defiance of his instructions, to Desroches' irritation. Marion petitioned Desroches to have permission to bring Rochon on his own journey, but to no avail. Marion was interested not only in Rochon's skills, but also in Berthoud's no. 6 marine chronometer that Rochon had at his disposal. He argued that Kerguelen's southwards voyage would have little use of longitude measurements, and was frustrated that Desroches, even though he was himself a Navy officer, would refuse.)

Gros Ventre and Fortune sailed south, the crew suffering considerably from the cold, for which they were neither prepared nor equipped. On 13 February 1772, they sighted land, and Ensign Boisguehenneuc managed to land, and claim the new shore for France.

On 14 February, the weather was bad and Fortune effected repairs on her damaged mainmast, while Gros Ventre hugged the coast to survey it and attempt a landing. Gros Ventre found herself in uncharted shallow waters, and Kerguelen despatched his cutter Mouche, under Ensign Rosily, to provide assistance and bring orders to meet at Isle de France should Fortune and Gros Ventre be separated. Rosily managed to reach Gros Ventre but broke her foremast in doing so. He nevertheless managed to sound in front of Gros Ventre, allowing her to reach safer waters.

Gros Ventre launched a boat, under Mengaud, to claim the territory for France. Mengaud succeeded in landing, and then deployed a white flag and buried bottles containing texts of the claims. Mengaud stayed about 15 minutes on the island, and noted that the birds there did not seem to fear humans, indicating that the land was not inhabited. He then returned to Gros Ventre.

Gros Ventre picked up Mengaud's and Rosily's parties. She abandoned Rosily's cutter, which was too large to bring aboard.

Fortune sailed away to avoid the worst of the storm, and on the 16th she found herself separated from Gros Ventre. The two ships searched for each other for two days, before giving up. Fortune returned to Isle de France under Kerguelen, Gros Ventre sailed under Saint Aloüarn to the 40th South parallel, where she arrived on 4 March, and on the 17th she reached Cape Leeuwin. She continued on an independent exploration of the northern coast of Australia before returning to Isle de France.

== Aftermath ==
On 16 July, Kerguelen arrived at Brest. He then went to Versailles, arriving on the 23rd. On 25 July, the Navy Minister introduced him to Louis XVI. Kerguelen reported his finding, and Louis XVI promoted him to Captain on the spot.

Kerguelen equated his finding with the land discovered by Gonneville, and made enthusiastic descriptions of his discovery. British newspapers further inflated these exaggerations, and stated as fact that the newly discovered lands were inhabited by an advanced, enlightened and friendly people. Kerguelen made no efforts to dispel this misconception. Instead, he requested five fluyts to mount a second expedition and confirm his findings.

The fad around Kerguelen led to the cancellation of Bougainville's plans for an expedition to the North Pole, and to organising the Second voyage of Kerguelen.

== See also ==
- Second voyage of Kerguelen
