= French Western Australia =

18th-century French territorial claim

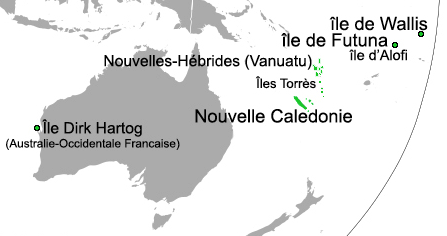
Left, in Western Australia, Dirk Hartog Island where Saint-Aloüarn first landed

French Western Australia (French: Australie-Occidentale française) was a French territorial claim in modern-day Western Australia. It was made at Dirk Hartog Island by an expedition under French explorer Louis Aleno de St Aloüarn (also Saint-Aloüarn) in 1772.

== History ==
=== French expedition ===
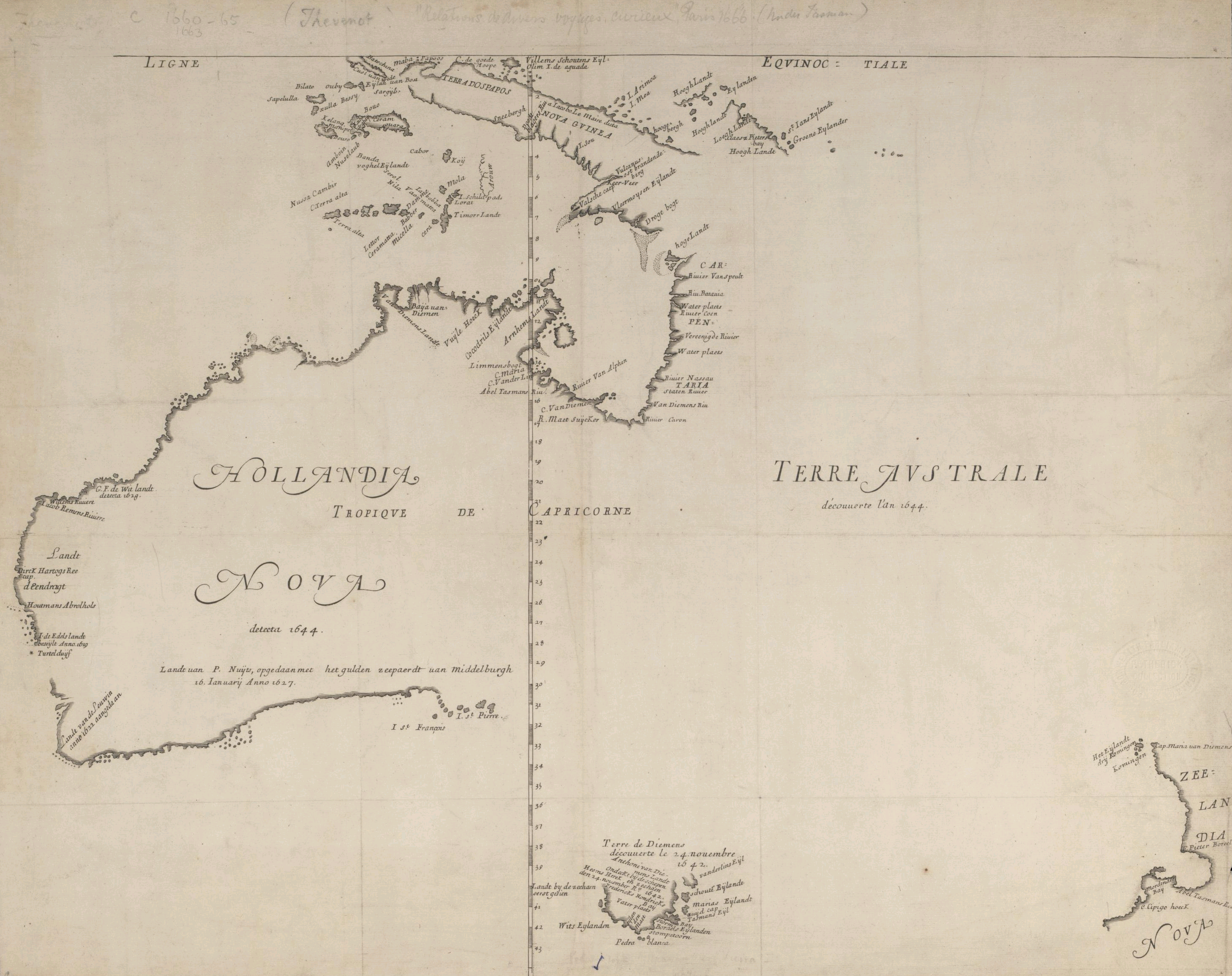
1663 map edited by French cartographer Melchisédech Thévenot: Terre Australe decouuerte l'an 1644, Paris: De l'imprimerie de Iaqves Langlois, collaboration by Dutch cartographer Joan Blaeu.

On 28 March 1772, the French navigator Louis Aleno de St Aloüarn landed on Dirk Hartog Island "and became the first European to claim possession of Western Australia". The actual claim for French Western Australia on behalf of King Louis XV was made at Baie de Prise de Possession (literally, 'Bay of taking Possession'; later Turtle Bay), Dirk Hartog Island on 30 March 1772 by officer Jean Mengaud de la Hage while Louis Aleno de St Aloüarn remained aboard the ship. Members of Mengaud's ceremonial team raised the royal flag on the island and buried a bottle containing a document stating what had occurred, alongside two silver écu coins, worth six Livres tournois (Francs). This occurred in sight of Cape Inscription, where in 1696 the Dutch mariner Willem de Vlamingh had also left a commemorative plate recording his visit and that of Dirk Hartog in 1616.

=== Later discoveries ===
An 18th century bottle was recorded, containing an annexation document and a coin. In 1998, a lead bottle cap with a shield coin set into it was discovered at Turtle Bay by a team led by Philippe Godard and Max Cramer. This triggered a wider search by a team from the Western Australian Museum led by Myra Stanbury, with Bob Sheppard, Bob Creasy and Michael McCarthy. On 1 April 1998, an intact bottle bearing a lead cap identical to the one found earlier, also with an écu coin in it, was unearthed. This led to a ceremony on 30 March 1999, during which several bottles were buried on the island.

== Places ==
About 260 places in Western Australia bear French names today; examples by alphabetical order:

1. Cape Le Grand
2. Cape Naturaliste
3. Cape Peron (Cap Péron, or Pointe Péron, southern outskirts of Perth)
4. Capel
5. Capel River (rivière Capel)
6. Shire of Capel
7. D'Entrecasteaux National Park
8. Espérance
9. Francois Peron National Park
10. Geographe Bay (Baie du Géographe);
11. Jurien Bay (Baie Jurien)
12. Lancelin
13. Leschenault
14. Leschenault Estuary (estuaire Leschenault)
15. Lesueur National Park
16. Péron
17. Point D'Entrecasteaux
18. Point Samson
19. Recherche Archipelago (Archipel de la Recherche)

Moreover, Western Australian historian and university researcher Noelene Bloomfield explains, in her book Almost a French Australia, that most of the so-called Dutch-sounding names in Western Australia were in fact given by French explorers.

Zoologist Danielle Clode wrote in her documentary French Voyages of Discovery to Australia:

More interested in science than in new colonies, these early French voyages, led by commanders like Bougainville, Lapérouse, D’Entrecasteaux, Baudin, Freycinet, Duperrey and Dumont d’Urville, were the first to name, describe and beautifully illustrate many Australian species. They took specimens back to French museums where they provided an important foundation for Australian biology and conservation, particularly in botany and marine biology. England may have colonised Australia, but for many years it was France that understood it best.

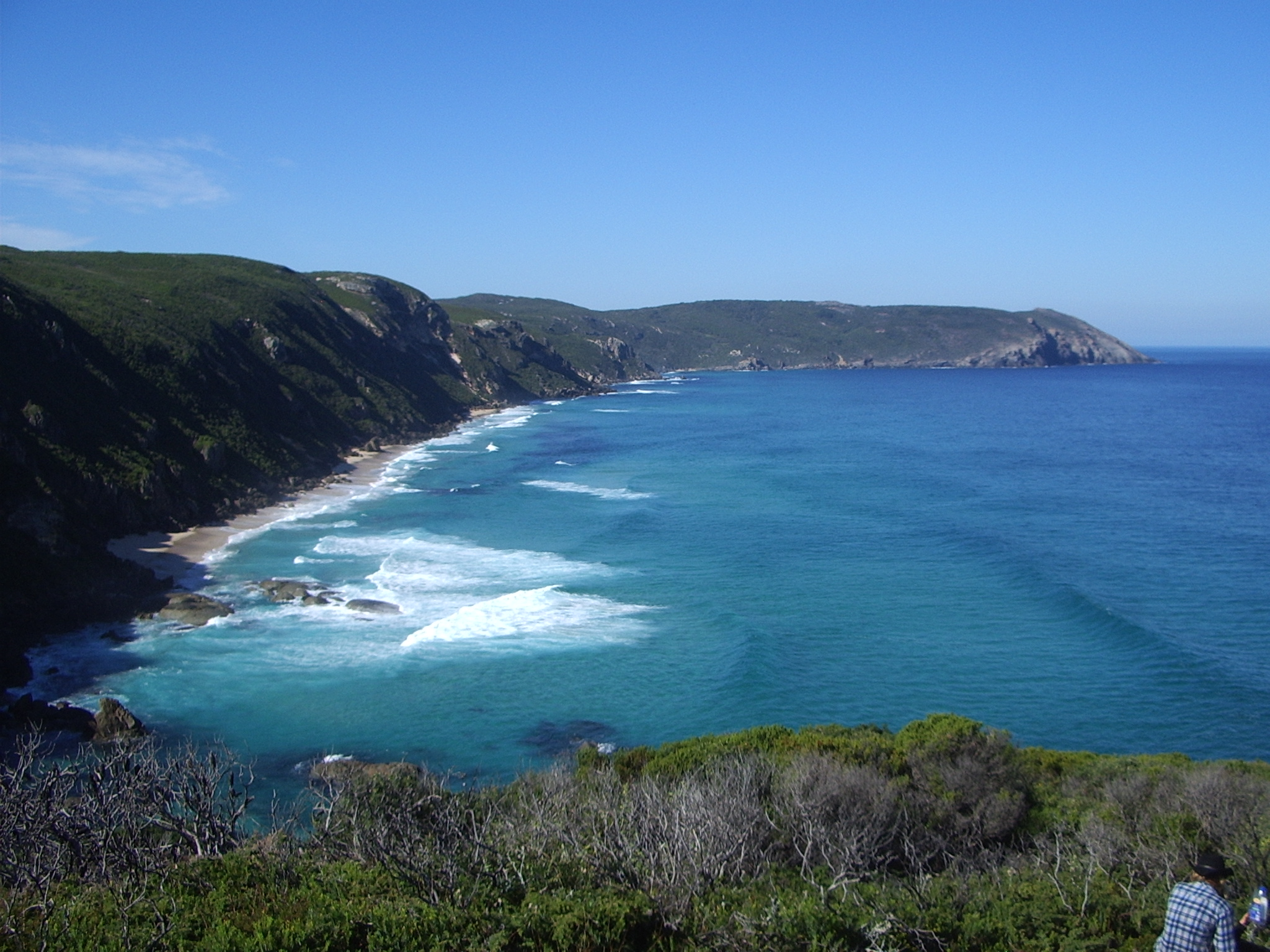
Coastline of D'Entrecasteaux National Park in 2008

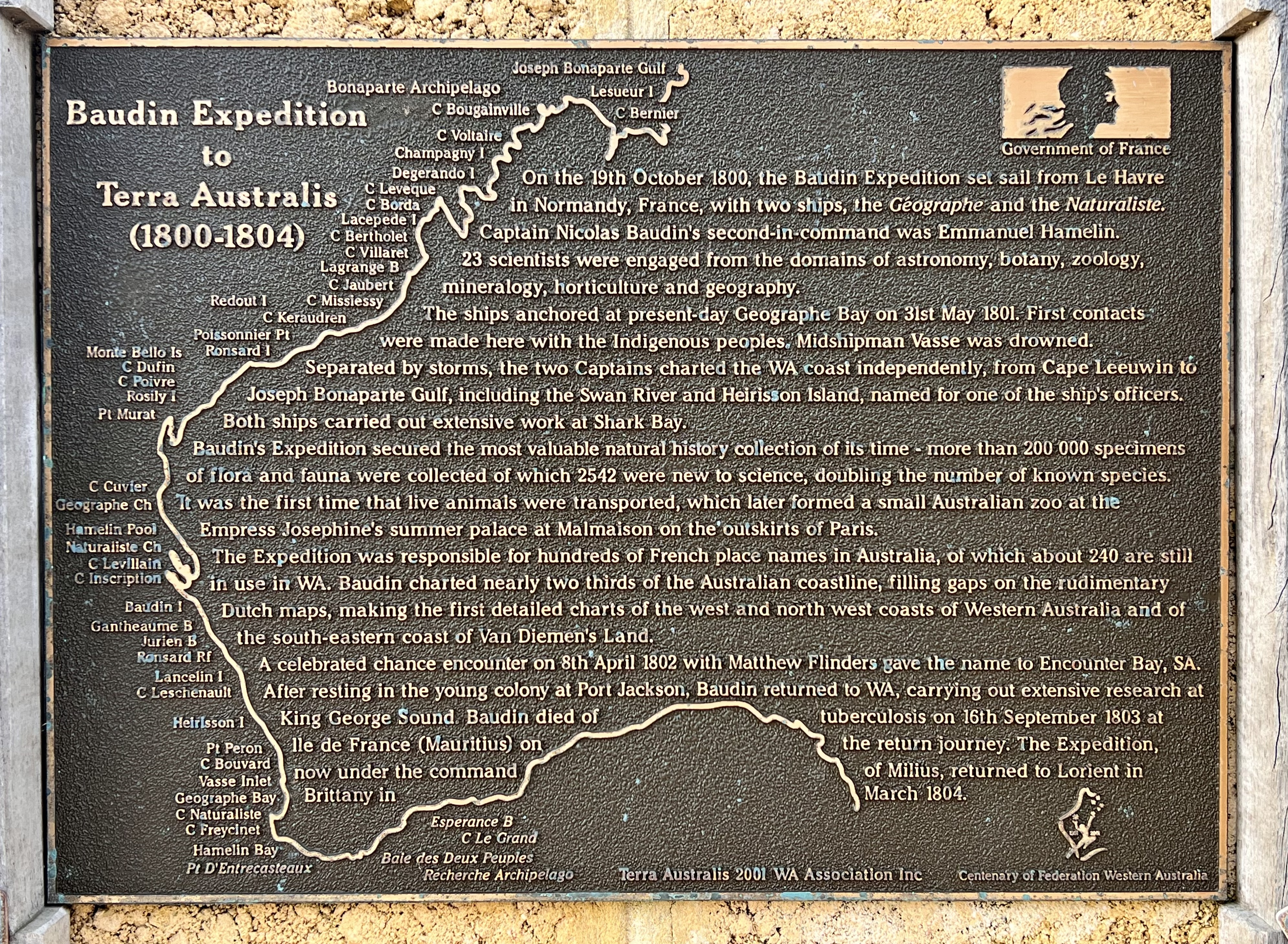
Nicolas Baudin's bust plaque in Busselton in 2022

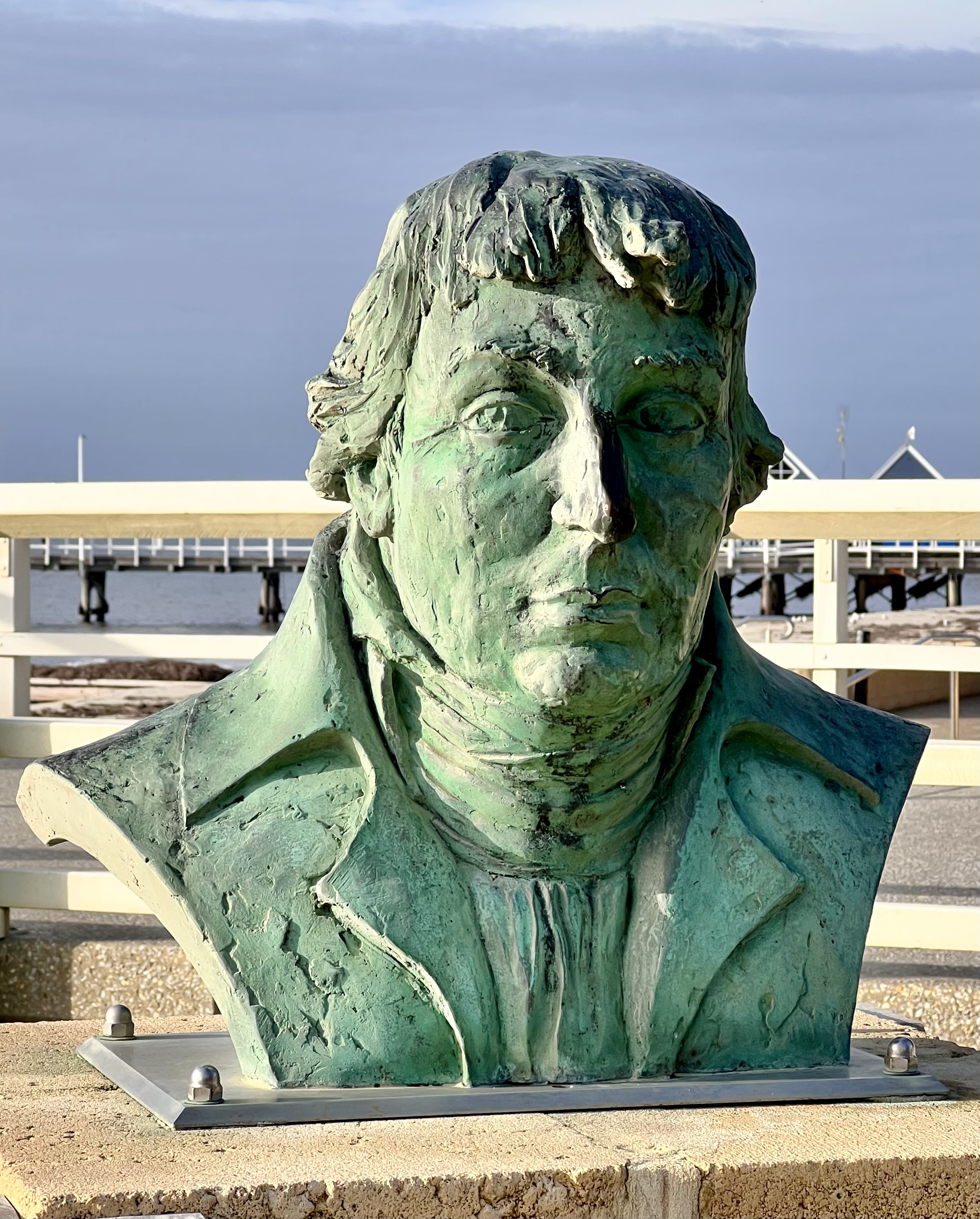
Nicolas Baudin Bust in Busselton in 2022

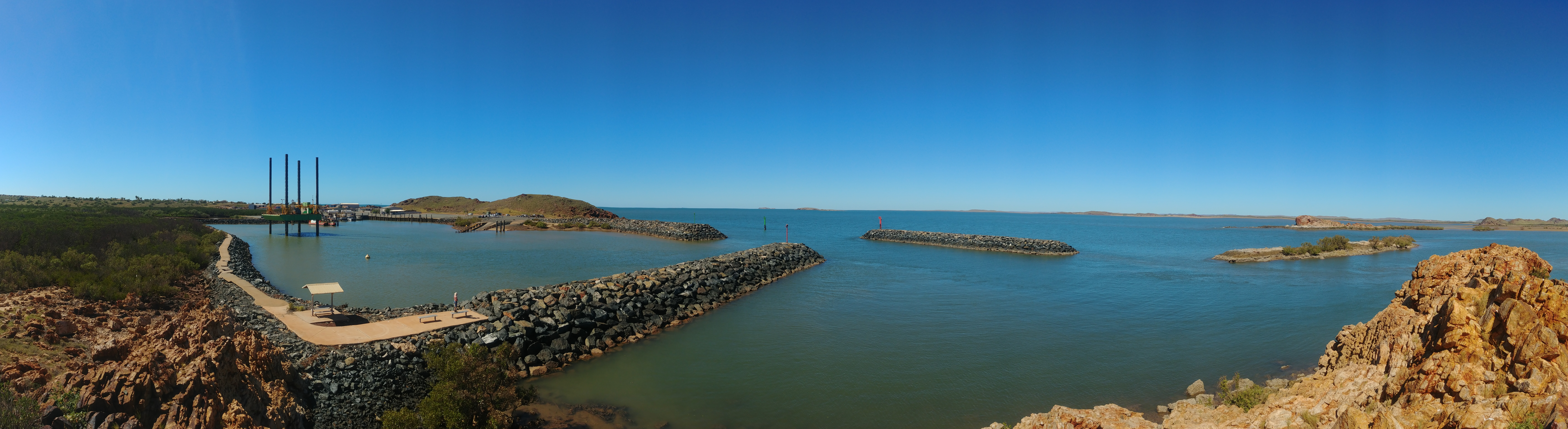
Point Samson Boat Harbour in 2019

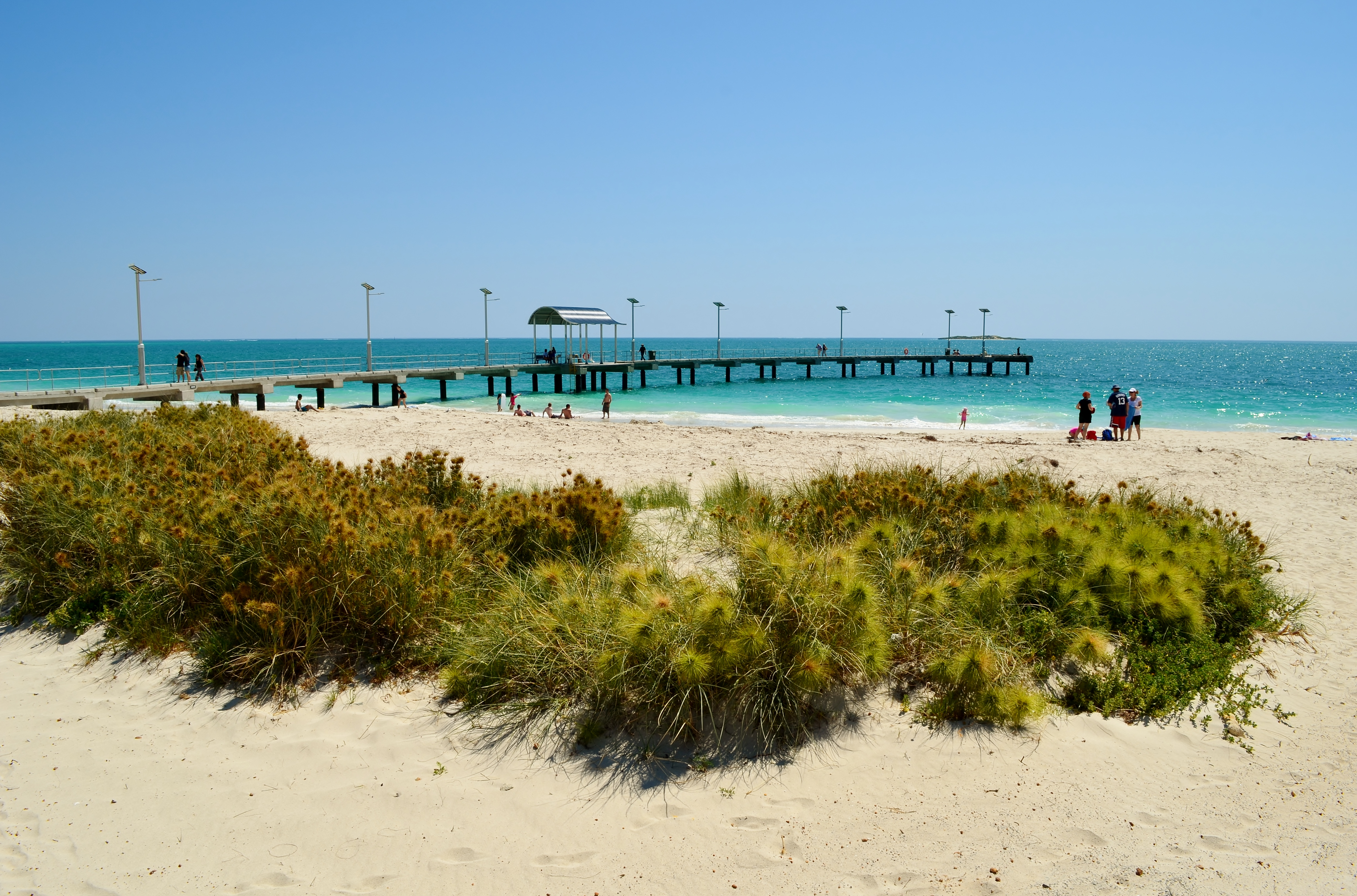
Jurien Bay Jetty in 2012

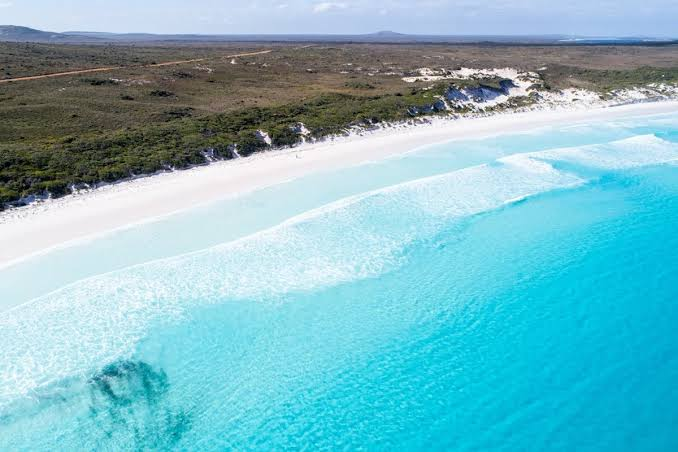
Coastline near Esperance in 2020

== More ==
Several exhibitions were organised around French Western Australia:

- Canberra, National Museum of Australia: 15 March 2018 – 11 June 2018
- Perth, Western Australian Museum: 12 September 2018 – 12 February 2019
- Le Havre, Musée d'histoire naturelle: 5 June 2021 – 7 November 2021

About the 2018–2019 Western Australian Museum exhibition, Diana Jones (its executive director of collections and research) declared:

Whatever the motives, the expedition returned with more than 18,000 specimens of flora, fauna and other objects – 10 times that of British explorer James Cook, during his famous second journey to Australia. [...] Of the animals, there were 3,500 species new to science and there was something like 460 plant specimens new to science. [...] That doubled the number of known specimens in the world at the time.

== See also ==
- History of Australia, European maritime exploration of Australia
- Binot Paulmier de Gonneville (c. 1480-c. 1560), potential discoverer of Terra Australis, around 1504
- Theory of the Portuguese discovery of Australia (1522)
- Jave la Grande
- Dieppe maps
- Botany Bay, La Pérouse expedition (1788)

== General references ==
=== In French ===
- Duigou, Serge (1989). L'Australie oubliée de Saint-Allouarn (in French). Quimper: éditions Ressac.
- Godard, Philippe; Kerros, Tugdual de (2002). Louis de Saint Aloüarn, lieutenant des vaisseaux du Roy (in French). Rennes: éditions des Portes du Large. p. 364. ISBN 2-914612-08-7.
- Delacroix, Gérard (2003). Le Gros Ventre (in French). Paris: éditions ANCRE. p. 135. ISBN 2-9527406-0-7.

=== In English ===
- Dunmore, John (1965). French Explorers in the Pacific. Vol. I. Oxford: Clarendon Press.
- Godard, Philippe (1999). "The Saint Alouarn discoveries" (PDF). Quarterly Newsletter: The Australian Association for Maritime History (77).
- Godard, Philippe; Kerros, Tugdual de; Margot, Odette; Stanbury, Myra; Baxter, Sue; Western Australian Museum; Godard, Phillippe; De Kerros, Tugdual; Margot, Odette; Stanbury, Myra; Baxter, Sue (2008), 1772 : the French annexation of New Holland : the tale of Louis de Saint Aloürn, Western Australian Museum, ISBN 978-1-920843-98-4
- Marchant, Leslie Ronald (1982), France Australe : a study of French explorations and attempts to found a penal colony and strategic base in south western Australia 1503-1826, Artlook, ISBN 978-0-86445-104-0
- McCarthy, Mike (2006). Disturbances at the French Annexation site on Dirk Hartog Island. Fremantle, Western Australian Maritime Museum.
