= Jean Joseph Hubert =

French Navy officer and captain

Jean-Joseph Hubert (French pronunciation: [ʒɑ̃ ʒozɛf ybɛʁ]; Saint-Arnoult-en-Yvelines, 17 December 1765 – off Cádiz, 25 October 1805) was a French Navy officer and captain.

== Career ==
Hubert joined the French Royal Navy as a volunteer on 27 September 1780, and served on Languedoc during the American War of Independence. On 5 October 1787, he was promoted to sub-Lieutenant.

During the French Revolution, Hubert was promoted to Ensign on 12 January 1792 and served on Vengeur until she ran aground and was lost off Ajaccio. He was then given command of the xebec Jacobin (a Mediterranean trading vessel). Promoted to Lieutenant on 10 September 1794, he was appointed on 21 October to captain the frigate Boudeuse, and transferred to the frigate Alceste on 31 March 1795.

On 4 May 1795, Hubert was promoted to captain. Still captaining Alceste, he took part in the Battle of Hyères Islands, where he battled several British ships before rescuing Alcide

On 23 February, Hubert transferred to the frigate Junon. He captained the 80-gun Guillaume Tell from 10 May 1797, and in August 1798 he successively commanded the 64-gun Banel and her sister-ship Frontin.

In 1799, Hubert was appointed to the frigate Carmagnole and he took part in the action of 8 July 1800. In November, Carmagnole ran aground by a storm at Vlissingen and was so wrecked that she was deleted on the spot.

On 9 March 1801, Hubert took command of the frigate Créole, and in July he was appointed to the 74-gun Swiftsure.

On 5 February 1804, Hubert was awarded the Legion of Honour. On 19 July 1804, Hubert took command of the 80-gun Indomptable, and he was promoted to Officier of the Legion of Honour on 14 June. In Villeneuve's fleet, he took part in the Battle of Cape Finisterre and in the Battle of Trafalgar, where he was wounded. Indomptable exchanged broadsides with HMS Belleisle before tacking to the South-East, firing on Revenge, Dreadnought and Thunderer, before observing Gravina's signals and sailing to Cadiz.

Four days later, on the 25th, Indomptable rescued survivors of the wreck of Bucentaure off Cadiz and anchored near Rota. During the night, her cables broke and she was thrown on the shore, where she was wrecked with only 150 survivors out of 1200 men. Hubert drowned.

== Sources and references ==
=== Bibliography ===
- Quintin, Danielle et Bernard (2003). Dictionnaire des capitaines de Vaisseau de Napoléon. S.P.M. ISBN 2-901952-42-9.
- Roche, Jean-Michel (2005). Dictionnaire des bâtiments de la flotte de guerre française de Colbert à nos jours 1 1671 – 1870. p. 25. ISBN 978-2-9525917-0-6. OCLC 165892922.
- Troude, Onésime-Joachim (1867). Batailles navales de la France. Vol. 4. Challamel ainé.
- GRC, GRC (1932). Histoire de Saint Arnoult. BRIONNE (Eure). p. 66.
- Fonds Marine. Campagnes (opérations; divisions et stations navales; missions diverses). Inventaire de la sous-série Marine BB4. Tome deuxième : BB4 1 à 482 (1790–1826)
