= French fluyt Gros Ventre =

French Navy ship launched in 1766

History

France
- Name: Gros Ventre
- Namesake: "Fat belly"
- Ordered: 31 March 1766
- Builder: Bayonne
- Laid down: April 1767
- Launched: 8 November 1766
- Out of service: 1778
- Fate: Hulked 1777

General characteristics
- Class & type: Tamponne-class fluyt
- Tons burthen: 350 t (340 long tons; 390 short tons)
- Length: 36.7 m (120 ft)
- Beam: 8.1 m (27 ft)
- Propulsion: Sail
- Armament: 16 × 6-pounders; later downgraded to 10 × 6-pounders

Gros Ventre was an armed storeship of the French Navy. She is notable for taking part in the First voyage of Kerguelen and for her subsequent solo mission of discovery to Australia. Anse du Gros Ventre was named in her honour.

== Career ==
Gros Ventre was built at Bayonne on plans by Léon-Michel Guignace, on plans by Jean-Joseph Ginoux, as a 16-gun armed storeship.

In 1768, she was at Brest, first under count de Roquefeuil-Montpeyroux, who sailed her to Amsterdam, and later under La Brizollière (Note: Roche writes "La Bisolière".) In 1769, command of Gros Ventre went to Beaumont, who sailed her from Rochefort to Toulon, calling Lisbon on the way, along with her sister-ship Tamponne. In 1771, she was under Faurès. (Note: Roche writes "Fores".)

In 1772, Gros Ventre was at Isle de France (Mauritius). On 20 August 1771, Berryer arrived at the island, under Lieutenant Kerguelen, tasked with a mission of exploration to seek new territories South of Isle de France. Kerguelen abandoned Berryer and requisitioned the 24-gun fluyt Fortune and Gros Ventre to continue his mission. Fortune and Gros Ventre started by surveying a new route to the Coromandel Coast discovered in 1767 by then-Ensign Grenier, of the corvette Heure du Berger. Then, on 16 January 1772, Gros Ventre and Fortune departed for the First voyage of Kerguelen, Gros Ventre under Saint Aloüarn.

Gros Ventre and Fortune sailed South, the crew suffering considerably from the cold, for which they were neither prepared nor equipped. On 13 February, they sighted land, and Ensign Boisguehenneuc managed to land, and claim the new shore for France. From 14, the ships surveyed the coast, but the poor state of the crew prevented anchoring. On 16, Gros Ventre and Fortune lost sight one from another in the fog and a heavy sea. On 18, both stopped searching for the other and, while Fortune returned to Isle de France under Kerguelen , Gros Ventre sailed under Saint Aloüarn to the 40th Southern parallel, where she arrived on 4 March, and on 17, she reached Cape Leeuwin.

For several days, Gros Ventre attempted to land a party ashore, but the cliffs and currents frustrated the attempt. The ship then sailed North, surveying the coast on the way, arriving at Shark Bay on 28 March. On 30, Gros Ventre found a spot where she could drop anchor and send a boat ashore, under Ensign Mengaud. Saint Aloüarn lay a claim by deploying a flag and burying a message and two coins.

Gros Ventre left Shark Bay on 8 April and sailed to Timor, following and surveying the Australian coast on the way. She arrived on 3 May and spent some time restoring her supplies and resting her crew. She departed again on 1 July, arriving at Batavia on 17 July. From there, she sailed on 8 August and arrived back at Isle de France on 5 September 1772. After Saint Aloüarn died, on 27 October 1772, Ensign Boisguehenneuc took command.

From 1774 to 1776, Gros Ventre was at Isle de France under Charles de Mengaud de la Haye, shuttling between Isle de France and Isle Bourbon (now La Réunion).

== Fate ==
In 1777, Gros Ventre was hulked at Isle de France. She is last mentioned in lists in 1779.

== Sources ==
- Archives nationales (2011). "Fonds Marine, sous-série B/4: Campagnes, 1571-1785" (PDF).
- Demerliac, Alain (2004). La Marine de Louis XVI: Nomenclature des Navires Français de 1774 à 1792 (in French). Éditions Ancre. ISBN 2-906381-23-3.
- "TAAF Le Gros Ventre Kerguelen Saint Alouärn exploration Terres Australes". Envelopmer - le courrier des marins. 27 October 2019.
- Guérin, Léon (1857). Histoire maritime de France (in French). Vol. 4. Dufour et Mulat. OCLC 419344391.
- Martin-Allanic, Jean-Étienne (1964). Bougainville Navigateur et les Découvertes de son Temps (in French). Paris: Presses Universitaires de France. OCLC 729759706.
- Roche, Jean-Michel (2005). Dictionnaire des bâtiments de la flotte de guerre française de Colbert à nos jours. Vol. 1. Group Retozel-Maury Millau. ISBN 978-2-9525917-0-6. OCLC 165892922.
- Taillemite, Étienne (1999). Marins français à la découverte du monde : de Jacques Cartier à Dumont d'Urville. France: Fayard. ISBN 2-213-60114-3. OCLC 937819780.
- Western Australian Museum. "Louis François Marie Aleno de Saint Aloüarn 1771–1772: First French claim to Australia". Journeys of Enlightenment: French exploration of Terres Autrales.

== General references ==
- Delacroix, Gérard (2003). Le Gros Ventre, Gabare du Roi - 1766. Nice: A.N.C.R.E. ISBN 9782903179342.
- Guérout, Max (2015). Tromelin, Mémoire d'une Ile. Paris: CNRS Éditions. p. 278. doi:10.4000/books.editionscnrs.27814. ISBN 9782271086662.
- Rebeyrol, Yvonne (1972). "La France prenait possession des îles Kerguelen". Le Monde.
