= Mascart =

Mascart is a surname. Notable people with the surname include:

- Éleuthère Mascart (1837–1908), French physicist
- Jean Mascart (1872–1935), French astronomer and mathematician

== See also ==
- Cape Mascart, on Adelaide Island
- Maxime Blocq-Mascart (1894–1965). French banker, economist and lobbyist who became a leader of the French Resistance
