= Islands of Angry Ghosts =

1966 book by Hugh Edwards

- Author: Hugh Edwards
- Genre: Non-fiction
- Publication date: 1966

Islands of Angry Ghosts is a 1966 book by Australian journalist and writer Hugh Edwards. The book is split into two parts: the first reconstructs the wreck and subsequent horrors, including mutiny, murder, rape and cannibalism, associated with the wreck of the Dutch East India Company's Batavia of the Western Coast of Australia; and the second follows the search for the wreck and salvage of the wreck by Edwards and a crew of divers.

The book is one of the more famous retellings of the wreck and subsequent mutiny alongside works like Henrietta Drake-Brockman's Voyage to Disaster and Max Cramer's Tragedies and Triumphs of the Batavia Coast. The book describes the "stark details of the months the survivors spent on the barren island."

At the time, the book was well received, earning the Sir Thomas White Memorial Prize for the best work published by an Australian in 1966. Kirkus reviews called the book a "great relish", writing that readers are "certain to finish" it. A new edition of the book was released in 2000.

== Adaptation ==
A one-year option for adapting the book into a film was purchased by Russell Crowe's production company "Fear of God" in 2016. Author of the popular historical text Batavia, Peter FitzSimons also hinted at negotiating rights for his work at a separate event. The purchase of adaptation rights followed an attempt to do a film about the Batavia wreck in 2008, which failed after initial auditions because of lack of funding.

== See also ==
- List of works about the Dutch East India Company
