= Jacques-Marie Cramezel de Kerhué =

Naval officer

Jacques-Marie Cramezel de Kerhué (died 1795) was a French Navy officer. He took part in the exploration voyages of Bougainville, fought in the American Revolutionary War, and took part in the British-backed Royalist insurgency against the Republic during the French Revolution.

== Biography ==
Kerhué joined the Navy as a Garde-Marine on 19 August 1757. He was promoted to Lieutenant on 14 February 1778, and to Major de vaisseau on 1 May 1786.

He took part in the Siege of Louisbourg in 1758. In 1765, he was appointed to the 20-gun corvette Étourdie for a cruise at Saint Pierre Island. He took part in the exploration voyage of Bougainville.

In 1778, he was first officer on the 32-gun frigate Fortunée, part of the fleet under Admiral d'Orvilliers.

At the French Revolution, he became an émigré, and took part in the Invasion of France in 1795. He was killed in June.

== Sources and references ==
Notes

Bibliography

- Dunmore, John (2005). Storms and Dreams: Louis de Bougainville : Soldier, Explorer, Statesman. Exisle Publishing. ISBN 9780908988570.
- Lacour-Gayet, G. (1910). La marine militaire de la France sous le règne de Louis XV. Paris: Honoré Champion.
- Roche, Jean-Michel (2005). Dictionnaire des bâtiments de la flotte de guerre française de Colbert à nos jours. Vol. 1. Group Retozel-Maury Millau. ISBN 978-2-9525917-0-6. OCLC 165892922.
- Taillemite, Étienne (2011). Bougainville. Perrin. ISBN 9782262022211. OCLC 767578875.
