= Max Cramer =

Australian diver

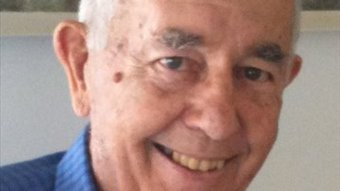
Max Cramer

Max Cramer OAM (6 July 1934 – 3 August 2010) was an Australian scuba diver and co-discoverer of the Batavia wreck on 4 June 1963. He was involved in a number of maritime archaeology projects pertaining to historic shipwrecks in Western Australia.

== Early life ==
Max Cramer was born on 6 July 1934. He grew up on Mt Fairfax farm near Moonyoonooka, just east of Geraldton in Western Australia. He attended Geraldton Senior High School, leaving at 16 and becoming a builder by trade. In the 1950s he developed an interest in scuba diving, still a novel recreational activity. Cramer was also keen on local history and was aware that the Dutch ship Batavia had been wrecked off the coast of Geraldton, on the Houtman Abrolhos, on 4 June 1629. This calamity had been followed by the infamous Batavia Mutiny. Searchers had been trying to locate the wreck of Batavia for over 100 years. In fact, they had been searching in the wrong area for most of that period, in the Pelsaert Group of the Houtman Abrolhos.

== Co-discovery of Batavia wreck ==
Research in the 1950s by Henrietta Drake-Brockman strongly pointed to Batavia actually lying in the Wallabi Group, 50 kilometres (31 mi) to the north. Based on this theory, Cramer and other scuba enthusiasts such as Hugh Edwards began diving on the reefs and around the islands there. Then in 1963 a crayfisherman, Pop Martin, unexpectedly dug up a skeleton on one of the islands. That aroused great interest. Then another crayfisherman, Dave Johnson, mentioned to Cramer that he had also seen objects under the water nearby, including what might be an anchor and cannons. On 4 June 1963, Max Cramer, his brother Graham Cramer, Tom Brady and Greg Allen dived at the spot, Morning Reef. Within minutes they had found the legendary wreck, exactly 334 years to the day of its sinking.

The discovery created an international sensation and Cramer's life was irrevocably changed. He became an explorer of wrecks par excellence, in the service of maritime archaeology, and a champion of the rich maritime history and heritage of what is now known as the Batavia Coast.

== Cramer's role in maritime archaeology ==
The discovery of Batavia was an event that saw the real commencement of Cramer's long involvement in locating and assisting in the recovery of material from some of Australia's most historic wrecks, often at his own expense. This included Zeewijk, wrecked in the Pelsaert Group of the Houtman Abrolhos in 1727, which he dived on earlier in 1963, and Zuytdorp that came to grief when it struck the Zuytdorp Cliffs, 560 kilometres (350 mi) north of today's Perth, in 1712. Cramer, his brother Graham, and Tom Brady were the first to dive on that wreck, in May 1964. This was a very dangerous undertaking as the wreck sits underwater at the base of a cliff, and it is only calm enough to safely enter the water on a few days each year.

Max Cramer also helped to promote research into the fate of all the Dutch seafarers stranded on the coast of Western Australia during the 17th and early 18th centuries. As an extension of his activities he was co-leader of an expedition to Shark Bay early in 1998 which recovered a bottle, sealed with a French coin, left by Captain Louis Aleno de St Aloüarn of Gros Ventre in 1772, which had probably contained a document claiming possession of Australia for France. (Note: According to Australia on the Map's Landings List database, this was the 40th contact by Europeans with Australia and only the second French ship to visit Australia.)

== Cramer's role in fostering Batavia Coast heritage ==
Max Cramer was also noted for his promotion of the region's early maritime heritage and history. In 1993 he became founding chair of the Batavia Coast Maritime History Association, and strongly advocated for the housing and display of a proportion of artefacts from Batavia and other historic wrecks in Geraldton. This led to a purpose-built maritime museum being established in Geraldton, the Geraldton Maritime Museum.

In 2009, as an initiative arising from the Australia on the Map: 1606 – 2006 commemorations, marking the 400th anniversary of Australia's first recorded contact with Europeans, Cramer and the Batavia Coast Maritime Heritage Association erected a statue in Geraldton of Wiebbe Hayes, leader of opposition to the Batavia mutineers.

== Community heritage projects and recognition ==
Other projects initiated by Max Cramer included the erection of a rotunda, which he helped to build, at the Old Lighthouse Keepers Cottage at Bluff Point, to enhance its heritage value. He also helped to inspire the community to build a replica of the Merry-Go-Round by the Sea, the subject of a book of the same name by Randolph Stow.

As a result of his exploits, activities, initiatives and other forms of participation in the community Max Cramer was twice made Citizen of the Year in Geraldton, in 1979 and 1999. In 2008 he was awarded a Medal of the Order of Australia (OAM) for "service to maritime history and to the community of Geraldton."

He died on 3 August 2010, aged 76.

== See also ==
- Shipwrecks of Western Australia

== General references ==
- Cramer, Max (1999). Treasures, Tragedies and Triumphs of the Batavia Coast. Perth: Scott Four Colour Print.
- Gerritsen, Rupert; Cramer, Max; Slee, Colin (2005) [2003]. The Batavia Legacy. Geraldton: Batavia Coast Maritime Heritage Association.
