= French fluyt Fortune =

History

France
- Name: Fortune
- Builder: Rochefort
- Laid down: 1755
- Launched: 2 February 1757
- In service: February 1758
- Out of service: June 1774
- Fate: Wrecked June 1774

General characteristics
- Tons burthen: 600 tonnes
- Length: 45.5 metres
- Beam: 8.7 metres
- Propulsion: Sail
- Armament: 20 to 24 guns

Fortune was an armed storeship of the French Navy. She is notable for taking part in the First voyage of Kerguelen.

== Career ==
In the 1760s, Fortune was in service between France and America, sailing from Rochefort, Bordeaux and Brest, bound for Louisiane, Saint-Domingue and Cayenne.

On 20 August 1771, Berryer arrived at the island, under Lieutenant Kerguelen, tasked with a mission of exploration to seek new territories South of Isle de France. Kerguelen abandoned Berryer and requisitioned Fortune and the 16-gun Gros Ventre to continue his mission. Fortune and Gros Ventre started by surveying a new route to the Coromandel Coast discovered in 1767 by then-Ensign Grenier, of the corvette Heure du Berger. Then, on 16 January 1772, Gros Ventre and Fortune departed for the First voyage of Kerguelen.

Gros Ventre and Fortune sailed South, the crew suffering considerably from the cold, for which they were neither prepared nor equipped. On 13 February, they sighted land, and Ensign Boisguehenneuc managed to land, and claim the new shore for France. From 14, the ships surveyed the coast, but the poor state of the crew prevented anchoring. On 16, Gros Ventre and Fortune lost sight one from another in the fog and a heavy sea. On 18, both stopped searching for the other and, Fortune returned to Isle de France under Kerguelen, while Gros Ventre went on to continue her mission of the shores of Australia.

== Fate ==
Fortune was wrecked at Fort Dauphin, in Madagascar, in June 1774
