= Charles de Mengaud de la Haye =

French Navy officer of the War of American Independence

Charles de Mengaud de La Haye (Note: Also written "La Hage".) was a French Navy officer. He served in the War of American Independence.

== Biography ==
Mengaud was born to the family of a Council of the Parliament of Toulouse. He joined the Navy as a Garde-Marine on 1 July 1756.

In 1768, Mengaud captained Écluse in Brest. In 1772, he commanded the 6-gun cutter Sauterelle, cruising between Lorient and Groix. He sailed Sauterelle to Isle de France (Mauritius). He took part in the First voyage of Kerguelen.

On 1 October 1773, he was promoted to Lieutenant. Between 1774 and 1776, he commanded the fluyt Gros Ventre at Isle de France (Mauritius).

In early 1778, Mengaud commanded the 16-gun corvette Perle. On 26 February 1778, Mengaud received orders to patrol between Ushant and The Lizard. On 28 May, he wrote a letter to the Navy Minister arguing for an invasion of Jersey and Gernesey, as to cut down the depredations of British privateers on French commerce.

In 1779, Mengaud captained the 32-gun frigate Gentille. He took part in the action of 17 August 1779 where she and Junon captured the 64-gun HMS Ardent. By 1780, Mengaud transferred from Gentille to Charmante.

On 16 February 1780, Charmante was part of a squadron comprising the 64-gun Ajax and Protée, as well as the fluyt Éléphant. In the action of 24 February 1780, the convoy encountered a British force under George Rodney, and Protée sacrificed herself to cover the retreat of her fellows. While the convoy sailed on to the Indian Ocean with Ajax, Charmante returned to Lorient to bring the news of the battle, arriving there on 3 March.

Charmante was wrecked on 24 March 1780 when a gale pushed her on the Chaussée de Sein. 83 men, including Mengaud, managed to escape on the ship's longboat, while 210 men died. (Note: According to Lacour-Gayet, Mengaud de la Hage also died in the accident.)
