= French ship Berryer (1770) =

East indiaman

History

France
- Name: Berryer
- Builder: Lorient
- Laid down: March 1759
- Launched: 20 October 1759
- Out of service: 1773

General characteristics
- Displacement: 1500 tonneaux
- Tons burthen: 900 port tonneaux
- Length: 47.3 metres
- Beam: 11.4 metres
- Draught: 5.2 metres
- Propulsion: Sail
- Armament: 60 guns

Berryer was a 56-gun East Indiaman, and later ship of the line of the French Navy. Lieutenant Yves-Joseph de Kerguelen-Trémarec sailed her from France to Isle de France as a precursor to his first expedition to the southern Indian Ocean.

== Career ==
Berryer was started as an East Indiaman and put in service by the French East India Company. She departed for her first voyage on 26 March 1760, and performed three commercial journeys to China and two to the Mascarene Islands for the company before it went bankrupt.

In April 1770, the French Navy purchased her and commissioned her as a 56-gun ship of the line.

On 20 August 1771, Berryer arrived at the island, under Lieutenant Kerguelen, tasked with a mission of exploration to seek new territories South of Isle de France. Kerguelen abandoned Berryer and requisitioned the 24-gun fluyt Fortune and the 16-gun Gros Ventre to continue his mission.
