= Louis Aleno de Saint-Aloüarn =

French explorer (1738–1772)

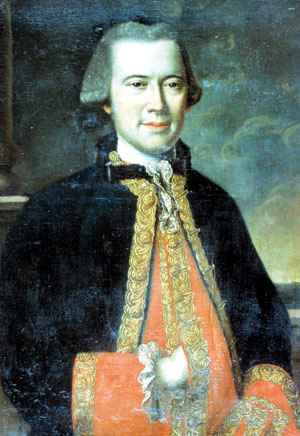
- Born: 25 July 1738 Saint-Aloüarn, Brittany, Kingdom of France
- Died: 27 October 1772 (aged 34) Port Louis, Isle de France
- Branch: French Navy
- Known for: claimed French Western Australia

Louis Francois Marie Aleno de Saint Aloüarn (French pronunciation: [lwi fʁɑ̃swa maʁi aleno də sɛ̃t ͜ alwaʁn]; 25 July 1738 – 27 October 1772) was a French Navy officer and explorer who claimed French Western Australia.

St Aloüarn made the first formal European claim of sovereignty — on behalf of France — over the west coast of Australia, which was known at the time as "New Holland". Much of this west coast had already been charted by other mariners from the Netherlands, following a landing by Dirk Hartog in 1616, who left a commemorative plaque recording his visit. James Cook, in 1770, had charted and claimed the east coast for Britain. When St Aloüarn visited New Holland in 1772, neither British nor Dutch officials had issued a formal claim over this western part of New Holland. However, the French claim over Western Australia was never secured by a permanent settlement.

== Early life and military career ==
St Aloüarn's parents were François Marie Guénolé Pantaléon d’Aleno and Marie Josèphe Pélagie de Quillien, both members of the aristocracy. He was born at Saint-Aloüarn, near Guengat, Brittany.

The family, including St Aloüarn's father, had a history of service in the French Navy, and St Aloüarn joined the Gardes de la Marine in 1754. As a naval cadet, he joined his uncle, René de Rosmadec St Aloüarn, on the 74-gun warship Espérance. In November 1755, as it returned from a campaign off Canada, Espérance was attacked and captured by HMS Orford and HMS Revenge. St Aloüarn and his uncle became prisoners of war and were held in England for two years, before they were returned to France. Because of his bravery under fire, St Aloüarn was promoted to ensign.

The war continued and St Aloüarn was posted to Martinique on the 74-gun Défenseur. His father and uncle were both killed when the Juste was destroyed in 1759, at the Battle of The Cardinals (also known as the Battle of Quiberon Bay). During 1759–62, St Aloüarn served in France on smaller vessels and on shore. Between 1762 and 1767, St Aloüarn served on the 116-gun Royal Louis and the frigate Infidèle, at Martinique and Brest. He was promoted in 1763 to lieutenant. St Aloüarn took command of the storeship Ecluse in 1767, followed by the Aber Wrac'h in 1770.

In 1761, he married Marie Jeanne Corentine Drouallen, with whom he had a daughter and three sons. He was a Freemason, member of the Loge Parfaite Union of Quimper.

== Career as an explorer ==
In 1771, shortly after the death of his wife, St Aloüarn was approached by a colleague, Yves de Kerguelen, who asked him join an expedition to New Holland. This reflected a broader French drive to annex territories adjoining the Indian and Pacific Oceans. Kerguelen and St Aloüarn first travelled to Port Louis, Isle de France (now Mauritius). On 30 April 1771, they left Port Louis in two small vessels: Kerguelen on board the 24-gun fluyt Fortune and St Aloüarn commanding the 16-gun storeship Gros Ventre.

On 11 February 1772, in the southern Indian Ocean, the expedition sighted a large mountainous island that Kerguelen took for Australia. (The island was later named after him.) The two ships lost sight of each other during bad weather. After a party from Fortune had made a brief visit to the island, Kerguelen returned to France.

After also landing a party on the island, St Aloüarn continued towards Australia and a rendezvous point at Cape Leeuwin, arranged earlier with Kerguelen. On 17 March he arrived off a bay (later Flinders Bay), near the cape. With no sign of Kerguelen, St Aloüarn followed the coast northward.

At Baie de Prise de Possession ("Bay of Taking Possession"; later Turtle Bay), Dirk Hartog Island on 30 March 1772, officer Jean Mengaud de la Hage claimed French Western Australia, the first formal European claim in Western Australia, on behalf of King Louis XV while St Aloüarn remained aboard the ship. Members of Mengaud's ceremonial team raised the white ensign on the island and buried a bottle containing a document stating what had occurred, alongside two silver écu coins, worth six Livres tournois (Francs). This occurred in sight of Cape Inscription, where in 1696 the Dutch mariner Willem de Vlamingh had also left a commemorative plate recording his visit and that of Dirk Hartog in 1616.

== Aftermath ==
By the time of the annexation, many of the crew of Gros Ventre were exhausted and suffering from scurvy. St Aloüarn made for Portuguese Timor, where he and his crew recuperated for a short period. Gros Ventre then visited Batavia (Jakarta) in the Dutch East Indies, where St Aloüarn and some of his crew contracted "tropical diseases". On 5 September, they arrived at Port Louis, where they had been given up as lost. St Aloüarn was hospitalised and dictated a letter to Kerguelen, advising that he had taken possession of western New Holland. St Aloüarn failed to recover from his illness and died on 27 October.

In 1788, Captain Arthur Phillip established a British colony on the east coast of Australia, at Sydney. However, other French expeditions followed St Aloüarn to Western Australia. In 1792, Antoine Bruni d'Entrecasteaux named the St Alouarn Islands, south east of Cape Leeuwin after St Aloüarn. In 1800, Nicolas Baudin was the first to map the Western coast and a part of the Southern coast of Australia.

By 1826, following an expedition to the south coast of Western Australia by Jules Dumont d'Urville, British authorities were seeking to forestall French settlement in Australia. A British Army force, under Major Edmund Lockyer, was despatched from Sydney, establishing a permanent British settlement at King George Sound, named Frederick Town (or Frederickstown), later known as Albany.

== Searches for the annexation site ==
During the late 20th century, historian Leslie Marchant, one of whose specialities was the French exploration of Australia, and others, led expeditions that attempted to find the site of St Aloüarn's proclamation. However, the site was not located until January 1998, when an expedition, led by amateur archaeologists Philippe Godard and Max Cramer, visited Dirk Hartog Island and located an écu coin in a lead capsule, at Turtle Bay. The site was inspected and the find confirmed by staff of the Western Australian Maritime Museum.

Searches continued for a bottle reportedly buried by St Aloüarn's crew, containing a document proclaiming France's annexation of Western Australia. In April 1998, a WA Maritime Museum expedition, including archaeologists and remote sensing specialists, located a bottle, capped with a lead seal surrounding another écu; however, the bottle contained only sand. A comprehensive excavation of the site failed to locate any further artefacts.

There is anecdotal evidence that the proclamation was found decades earlier by a stock worker, was kept at the homestead of a sheep station operating on Dirk Hartog Island at the time and was later destroyed by fire.

The proclamation site was later protected by law and a commemorative plaque was placed at the spot.

== See also ==
- European and American voyages of scientific exploration

== Bibliography ==
- Association ponantaise d'histoire maritime (2011). Dictionnaire des marins francs-maçons, gens de mer et professions connexes aux XVIIIe, XIXe et XXe siècles. Travaux de la loge maritime de recherche La Pérouse (in French). Paris: SPM. ISBN 9782901952817. OCLC 743277085.
- John Dunmore, French Explorers in the Pacific. I., The Eighteenth Century, Oxford, Clarendon Press, 1965.
- Godard, Philippe (December 1999). "The Saint Alouarn discoveries" (PDF). Quarterly Newsletter: The Australian Association for Maritime History. Vol. 77. Archived from the original (PDF) on 19 February 2011.
- Philippe Godard & Tugdual de Kerros, Louis de Saint Aloüarn: lieutenant des vaisseaux du roy: un marin breton à la conquête des terres australes, Saint-Jacques-de-la-Lande, Portes du larges, 2002.
- Philippe Godard, Tugdual de Kerros, Sue Baxter, Odette Margot & Myra Stanbury, 1772 – The French Annexation of New Holland: The Tale of Louis de Saint Alouarn, Fremantle, Western Australian Maritime Museum, 2009.
- Leslie Marchant, France Australe, Perth, Artlook Books, 1982.
- McCarthy, Mack (September 2006). "Disturbances at the French Annexation site on Dirk Hartog Island: a report in readiness for the 2006 fieldwork". No. 218. Fremantle: Department of Maritime Archaeology, Western Australian Maritime Museum.
- Stanbury, Myra (June 1998). "France And Australia: The "Prise De Possession"". Western Australian Maritime Museum. Archived from the original on 19 December 2009.
- Stanbury, Myra (January 1999) [corrected 9 March 1999]. "Saint Aloüarn and the French Annexation of Western Australia, 1772. Report on 1998 Overseas Research". No. 147. Fremantle, WA: Department of Maritime Archaeology, Western Australian Maritime Museum.
- Western Australian Museum, de Kerguelen & de Saint Aloüarn (web page), 2008. Access date: 6 July 2010.
