= Second voyage of Kerguelen =

Expedition of French Navy

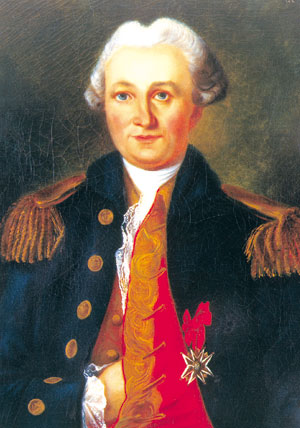
A portrait of Yves-Joseph de Kerguelen-Trémarec

The Second voyage of Kerguelen was an expedition of the French Navy to the southern Indian Ocean conducted by the 64-gun ship of the line Roland, the 32-gun frigate Oiseau, and the corvette Dauphine, under Captain Yves-Joseph de Kerguelen-Trémarec. The aims of the expedition were to confirm the findings of the First voyage of Kerguelen, returning the Kerguelen Islands and exploring what was thought to be a peninsula of a southern continent. The expedition, prepared with better equipment but less suitable ships than the first, led to the recognition that Kerguelen's southern continent was actually a barren archipelago.

Upon his return, Kerguelen was court-martialled in Brest on 15 May 1775 by a council of war presided over by Vice-Admiral Anne Antoine, Comte d'Aché for transporting 200 slaves on Roland from Madagascar to sell in French colonies in defiance of Louis XV, who had issued regulations ordering French Navy officers not to trade in slaves. At the court-martial, his defence lawyer minimised Kerguelen's slave-trading activities by stating that it was only "Eight or nine negroes that the pilot’s assistant bought on Kerguelen’s behalf". Although several other naval officers, many of whom were stationed at Rochefort, had traded in slaves, he was found guilty on 25 May 1776 and sentenced to six years imprisonment.

== See also ==
- First voyage of Kerguelen
