= Jean Mascart =

French astronomer

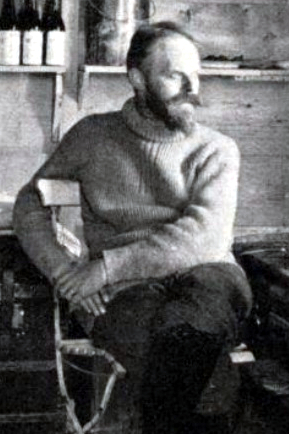
- Born: 7 March 1872; Paris, France
- Died: 28 March 1935 (aged 63); Paris, France
- Scientific career
- Fields: astronomy mathematics
- Institutions: Paris observatory

Jean Mascart (Paris, 7 March 1872 — Paris, 28 March 1935) was a French astronomer and mathematician.

== Career ==
Mascart was on the staff of the Paris observatory.

On 17 May 1910, Mascart was at Tenerife to observe Halley's Comet from the southern flank of Pico de Teide.

Jean Mascart was the son of physicist Éleuthère Mascart.

== Works ==
- Mascart, Jean (1919). Impressions et observations dans un voyage à Tenerife. Paris: E. Flammarion.
- Mascart, Jean (1897). Thèses présentées à la Faculté des sciences de Paris.
- Mascart, Jean (1907). L'Heure à Paris. Lyon: Gauthier-Villars.
- Mascart, Jean (1907). La Découverte de l'anneau de Saturne par Huygens, avec la reproduction des anciens dessins.
- Mascart, Jean (1910). La Comète de Halley.
- Mascart, Jean (1910). La Détermination des longitudes et l'histoire des chronomètres : détermination des longitudes.
- Mascart, Jean (1916). Exposition internationale de Lyon 1914. La Science à l'Exposition.
- Mascart, Jean (1919). La vie et les travaux du chevalier Jean-Charles de Borda (1733-1799). Épisodes de la vie scientifique au XVIII^{e} siècle. Lyon: A. Rey.
- Mascart, Jean (1925). Notes sur la variabilité des climats. Lyon: M. Audin et compagnie.
- Taillemite, Étienne; Lieppe, Denis (2000) [1919]. Preface. La vie et les travaux du chevalier Jean-Charles de Borda (1733-1799). Épisodes de la vie scientifique au XVIII^{e} siècle. By Mascart, Jean. Bibliothèque de la revue d'histoire maritime. Paris: Presses de l'Université de Paris-Sorbonne. ISBN 2-84050-173-2.
