= Hugh Edwards (journalist) =

Western Australian journalist, photographer and author (1933–2024)

William Hugh Edwards OAM (29 July 1933 – 10 May 2024) was a Western Australian journalist, author and marine photographer who wrote numerous books on maritime, local and natural history and diving.

== Life and career ==
William Hugh Edwards was born in Edinburgh, Scotland on 29 July 1933.

Edwards played a major part in the exploration of Dutch East India Company shipwrecks of the 17th and 18th centuries on the Western Australia coast. He was recognised as primary discoverer of the Batavia and Zeewyk.

Edwards died on 10 May 2024, at the age of 90.

== Books and awards ==
His book Islands of Angry Ghosts on his expedition to the site of Batavia, lost in the Abrolhos Islands in 1629, won the Sir Thomas White Memorial Prize for the best book written by an Australian in 1966. It covers the loss of the Dutch East Indiaman, the mutiny and massacre on the island, and the retributions.

Wreck on the Half Moon Reef is another of Edwards' books, on the loss of Zeewyk in 1727. Other titles include Shark – The Shadow Below, and Port of Pearls (on the north-west town of Broome and its pearling industry). Edwards' autobiography Dead Men's Silver detailing 60 years of diving, shipwreck discovery and salvage, was published in 2011.

He lived in Perth, Western Australia and was awarded the Medal of the Order of Australia in the 2009 Queen's Birthday Honours, in recognition of his "service to Australia's maritime heritage through the discovery of historic shipwrecks, and as an author".

== Works ==
- Edwards, Hugh (1966), Islands of Angry Ghosts, London Hodder & Stoughton
- —— (1970), The Wreck on the Half-Moon Reef, Rigby, ISBN 978-0-85179-108-1
- —— (1975), Sharks and Shipwrecks, New York Quadrangle/New York Times Book Co, ISBN 978-0-8129-0559-5
- —— (1975), Skin Diving, Paul Hamlyn, ISBN 978-0-600-07346-8
- —— (1978), Australian and New Zealand Shipwrecks & Sea Tragedies, Phillip Mathews, ISBN 978-0-908001-10-1
- —— (1982), The Crocodile God, Angus & Robertson, ISBN 978-0-207-14538-4
- —— (1984), Port of Pearls: a History of Broome (2nd ed.), H. Edwards, ISBN 978-0-7270-1885-4
- —— (1988), Crocodile Attack in Australia, Swan, ISBN 978-0-9587841-2-2
- —— (1991), Kimberley : Dreaming to Diamonds, H. Edwards, ISBN 978-0-646-05030-0
- —— (1994), Pearls of Broome and Northern Australia, The Author, ISBN 978-0-646-19309-0
- —— (1997), Shark : the Shadow Below, HarperCollins Publishers, ISBN 978-0-7322-5790-3
- —— (2000), Treasures of the Deep : the extraordinary life and times of Captain Mike Hatcher, HarperCollins Publishers, ISBN 978-0-7322-5885-6
- —— (2006), The Buccaneer's Bell, Tangee, ISBN 978-0-9757936-1-9
- —— (2008), A New Broome: Broome's 125th Anniversary, The Author, ISBN 978-0-646-50550-3
- —— (2011), Dead Men's Silver: The Story of Australia's Greatest Shipwreck Hunter, HarperCollins Publishers, ISBN 978-0-7304-9908-4
