= Binot Paulmier de Gonneville =

French explorer

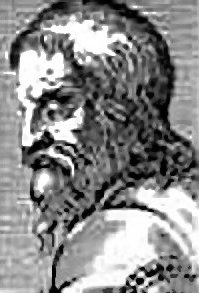
Binot Paulmier de Gonneville.

Binot Paulmier, sieur de Gonneville (French: [binɔ polmje də ɡɔnvil]), French navigator of the early 16th century, was widely believed in 17th and 18th century France to have been the discoverer of the Terra Australis. Some history books from the French region of Normandy have taught that de Gonneville arrived in what is now Southern Brazil in 1504.

According to his published memories, in 1503 de Gonneville, challenging the Portuguese policy of mare clausum, sailed from Honfleur in Normandy with his crew and the help of two Portuguese pilots, heading for the East Indies. When he reached the Cape of Good Hope his ship L'Espoir (The Hope) was diverted to an unknown land by a storm. In 1505 he returned claiming to have discovered the "great Austral land," which he also called the "Indes Meridionales". According to de Gonneville, he had stayed six months in this idyllic place, where the inhabitants didn't have to work because of the riches. De Gonneville stated that this land was six weeks' sail east of the Cape of Good Hope.

De Gonneville's tale was first mentioned only 160 years after it allegedly took place, in 1663, when Jean Paulmier de Courtonne, Canon of the Church of Saint-Pierre at Lisieux, a relative of de Gonneville's, published a book called Memoirs Concerning the Establishment of a Christian Mission in the Austral Land, in which he claimed to be the great-grandson of an "Indian" brought back to France by de Gonneville in 1505.

De Courtonne's claims struck a chord at a time when French patriotism was offended at the success of the Dutch and the English in making new discoveries in the South Pacific. De Gonneville's tales were fomented as the basis of a French claim over these new lands. This belief grew in the 18th century and led to French expeditions such as those of Bouvet, Bougainville, and Kerguelen.

Historians have proposed many places for the land that Gonneville discovered and that were presumed to be the legendary Terra Australis (or as had also been proposed, Madagascar). Some believe it was somewhere on the south coast of Brazil. Based on D'Avezac weak and never proved theory, others proposed São Francisco do Sul, in the state of Santa Catarina. Wherever the place of his arrival, and the inhabitants he encountered, Gonneville brought one Indigenous boy back to France (whose name the French rendered as Essomericq), who married Gonneville's daughter. Historian Leyla Perrone-Moises, who wrote a book on the subject, says the place of his arrival is unknown Since then, Binot Paulmier de Gonneville's purported feat as the first European to arrive in Southern Brazil, is celebrated annually both in his hometown of Honfleur, in Normandy, and in the island of São Francisco do Sul in Brazil, where a memorial plate has been erected commemorating the French explorer's arrival in 1504, notwithstanding the affair is more of a tale than a proven fact.

Some recent scholars have argued that Gonneville and his story were probably invented by Jean Paulmier de Courtonne, though others are uncertain of this argument.

== Novel ==
Arkan Simaan, Un marin en Terre des perroquets (“A sailor in Land of Parrots“), Ancre de marine éditions. It is a fiction based on the story of Binot Paulmier de Gonnevile who talks about the arrival of the first “French” in Brazil in 1504 and the first “Brazilian” in France. The author uses his imagination to fill the unknown episodes of Binot's story at the Admiralty of Rouen. There we find navigation, storms, the clash of cultures between Europeans and indigenous peoples, cannibalism, piracy, a naval battle, a shipwreck...
