= Joseph-François-Gabriel Hennequin =

French naval officer, biographer and author

- Born: 1775; Gerbéviller, France
- Died: 1842 (aged 66–67) Paris, France
- Branch: French Navy

Joseph-François-Gabriel Hennequin (Gerbéviller, 1775 – Paris, 1842) was a French naval officer, biographer and author.

== Biography ==
Born to a lawyer at the Parliament of Nancy, and cousin to lawyer Antoine-Louis-Marie Hennequin, Joseph Hennequin joined the French Navy as a boy in 1793, and rose to become an officer in charge of logistics. In 1809, he was appointed to the Ministry. From 1831 to 1838, he served as a department head.

Hennequin wrote numerous biographical articles in Galerie des contemporains, in Biographie universelle, in Encyclopédie des gens du monde, in Galerie française, etc., In Esprit de l’Encyclopédie, Hennequin compiled what he deemed to be the most relevant articles of the Encyclopédie (Paris, 1822–1823, 15 vol. in-8°);

Hennequin wrote Essai historique sur la vie et les campagnes du bailli de Suffren (Paris 1824, in-8°); Trésor des dames, ou Choix de pensées, maximes et réflexions extraites des ouvrages de femmes, etc. (Paris, 1826); Dictionnaire de maximes (Paris, 1827); Biographie maritime, and Notices historiques sur la vie et les campagnes des marins célèbres (Paris, 1835–1887, 3 vol. in-8°).

== Works ==
- Hennequin, Joseph François Gabriel (1835). Biographie maritime ou notices historiques sur la vie et les campagnes des marins célèbres français et étrangers (in French). Vol. 1. Paris: Regnault éditeur.
- Hennequin, Joseph François Gabriel (1835). Biographie maritime ou notices historiques sur la vie et les campagnes des marins célèbres français et étrangers (in French). Vol. 2. Paris: Regnault éditeur.
- Hennequin, Joseph François Gabriel (1835). Biographie maritime ou notices historiques sur la vie et les campagnes des marins célèbres français et étrangers (in French). Vol. 3. Paris: Regnault éditeur.

== Sources ==
- « Joseph-François-Gabriel Hennequin », in Pierre Larousse, Grand dictionnaire universel du XIXe siècle, 1863–1890, 15 vol.
