= French frigate Boudeuse =

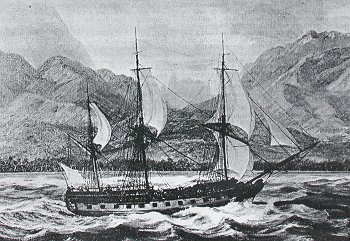
- Boudeuse arriving in Matavai in 1767.

History

France
- Name: Boudeuse
- Namesake: "Sulky (Girl)"
- Builder: Indret shipyard, near Nantes
- Laid down: May 1765
- Launched: 25 March 1766
- Completed: September 1766
- Out of service: 1800
- Fate: Broken up for firewood in 1800

General characteristics
- Class & type: Frigate
- Displacement: 1030 tonneaux
- Tons burthen: 580 port tonneaux
- Length: 40.6 m (133 ft) (gundeck); 38.33 m (125.8 ft) (keel)
- Beam: 10.61 m (34.8 ft)
- Draft: 5.36 m (17.6 ft)
- Depth of hold: 4.36 m (14.3 ft) (forward); 4.49 m (14.7 ft) (aft)
- Propulsion: Sail
- Complement: 214
- Armament: 26 guns (later 32); Upper deck: 26 × 12-pounder long guns; Upperworks: 6 × 6-pounder long guns + 2 × 36-pounder obusiers (all added later)
- Armour: timber

Boudeuse (French: [budøz]) was a 32-gun, 12-pounder-armed sailing frigate named Boudeuse on 6 June 1765. She is most famous for being the exploration ship of Louis Antoine de Bougainville between 1766 and 1769. She also served in the American and French Revolutionary Wars, during which she captured two enemy vessels. She was broken up for firewood at Malta in early 1800.

== Career ==
=== First French circumnavigation ===
Boudeuse, under Antoine de Bougainville, departed from Nantes on 15 November 1766 for the first French circumnavigation of the globe, along with the Étoile. On board was the botanist Philibert Commerçon and his valet, later unmasked by the ship's surgeon as Jeanne Baré, Commerçon's mistress; she would become the first woman to circumnavigate the globe.

The expedition saw islands of the Tuamotu group on the 22 March. On 2 April they saw the peak of Mehetia and famously visited the island of Otaheite shortly after. de Bougainville narrowly missed becoming their discoverer, unaware of a previous visit, and claim, by Samuel Wallis in HMS Dolphin less than a year previously. Bougainville claimed the island for France and named it New Cythera.

They left Tahiti, with Ahutoru aboard, and sailed westward to southern Samoa and the New Hebrides, then on sighting Espiritu Santo turned west still looking for the "Southern Continent". On June 4 he almost ran into heavy breakers and had to change course to the north and east. He had almost found the Great Barrier Reef. He sailed through what is now known as the Solomon Islands that, due to the hostility of the people there, he avoided. Bougainville named them Bougainville Island for himself. The expedition was attacked by people from New Ireland so they made for the Moluccas. At Batavia they received news of Wallis and Carteret who had preceded Bougainville.

On 16 March 1769 the expedition completed its circumnavigation and arrived at Saint-Malo, with the loss of only seven out of upwards of 200 men, an extremely low level of loss, and a credit to Bougainville's enlightened management of the expedition.

In 1775-76 Boudeuse underwent refitting at Brest.

=== American Revolutionary War ===
Boudeuse later took part in the American War of Independence under Lieutenant Grenier. On 13 January 1779, she captured the 16-gun sloop HMS Weazel off Sint Eustatius. The French took Weazel to the Antilles where they disarmed her by taking all her guns for Admiral d'Estaing's squadron. They then sold her at Guadeloupe in 1781.

On 28 February, Boudeuse took Saint Martin island. On 6 July 1779, she participated in the Battle of Grenada as a member of the rear guard.

=== French Revolutionary Wars ===
During the French Revolutionary Wars, in the action of 8 June 1794, Boudeuse captured from the Sardinian Navy the 36-gun former French frigate Alceste. The British had captured Alceste in Toulon harbour in August 1793 and then handed her over to the Sardinians.

=== Last journey ===
On 28 January 1799, Boudeuse, under the command of Lieutenant Calaman, sailed from Toulon to Malta. Boudeuse was loaded with essential supplies for the beleaguered French garrison in Malta which at the time was under a blockade. The French garrison under the command of General Claude-Henri Belgrand de Vaubois had withdrawn to the fortified cities found around the Grand Harbour basin following an armed insurrection by the Maltese back in September 1798. Portuguese and Royal Navy ships were assisting the Maltese rebellion by imposing a sea blockade on French shipping, thus cutting off French supplies. Under the cover of inclement weather, Boudeuse managed to run the blockade and on 4 February 1799 she entered the French-controlled Grand Harbour and moored under the Lower Barracca. In July 1800, the French authorities broke up Boudeuse for firewood because supplies of firewood for bakeries had run out.

== See also ==
- European and American voyages of scientific exploration
