= French corvette Heure du Berger =

History

France
- Name: Heure du Berger
- Namesake: Dawn (lit. "shephard's hour")
- In service: 1767
- Out of service: 1774

General characteristics
- Propulsion: Sail
- Armament: 1 gun

Heure du Berger (Note: Also Heure de Berger.) was a small corvette of the French Navy. She is notable for discovering a new route from Mauritius to India.

== Career ==
In 1767, Ensign Grenier took Heure du Berger for a voyage of exploration in the Indian Ocean, with astronomer Rochon, and discovered a new, quicker route from Isle de France to India.

In 1772, commended by Amiral de Saint-Félix, in charge to find legendary island San-Juan-de-Lisboa, in the Indian Ocean.
