= Jacques de Grenier =

French Navy officer of the 18th century

- Born: 28 June 1736 Saint-Pierre, Martinique
- Died: 2 January 1803 (aged 66) Paris, France
- Branch: French Navy
- Known for: exploring new route between Île de France (Mauritius) and French India
- Conflicts: Battle of Ushant; Battle of Grenada; Siege of Savannah

Jacques Raymond de Grenier du Giron (Saint-Pierre, Martinique, 28 June 1736 — Paris, 2 January 1803), (Note: Also "Giron-Grenier".) was a French navy officer. He is best known for discovering and exploring a new route between Île de France (Mauritius) and French India. He was admitted as a member of the Académie de Marine in 1769.

== Biography ==
Grenier was born to Angélique Gabrielle and to Raymond de Grenier, a cavalry officer in the Régiment de Berry who was given the rank of Frigate Lieutenant for services rendered at sea in America.

Grenier started a career in the military during the Seven Years' War, and later during operations against the Salé Rovers. He joined the Navy as a Garde-Marine on 12 December 1755.

On 1 November 1767, Grenier departed Brest as captain of the corvette Heure du Berger. When he arrived, the time was too far into the monsoon season to permit sailing to India, the governor of Isle de France sent him on a mission to Madagascar instead.

On 12 August 1768, Grenier departed Port-Louis towards Foulepointe. He then hugged the Eastern coast, sailing South, and surveyed it up to Manansari river. The expedition was originally intended to continue to Fort Dauphin, but a lack of provisions made it impossible to complete the mission. Grenier nevertheless surveyed numerous natural harbours and rivers in the coast, and found sports suitable to establish slaving outposts. He even brought a tribe chief from Mahanoro to Isle de France. On 26 August, Grenier arrived at Foulepointe, and on 30 September, at Lake Nossibe. He departed Tamatave on 12 October to anchor at Manuru on 7 November. On 23, he arrived at Mananzary, where he stayed until 23. He then departed on 13 December to return Ile Bourbon (now Réunion), arriving on 23. Grenier finally returned to Port Louis on 11 January 1769. There, he authored a memorandum titled Projet d’établissement à Madagascar.

In Spring, Grenier resumed his original mission. On 30 May 1769, he departed, along with Vert-Galant, under Commander La Fontaine, bound for Saint-Brandon, where he arrived on 2 June. He then sailed on the 5th Nazareth bank, then on Saya de Malha bank on 5 June, and continued North before sailing West to reach Seychelles, arriving at Mahé on 14 June. He then sailed to Praslin, spending the night of 14 there, and departed on 15. He sailed through Maldives and arrived at Malabar coast on 29 July, and eventually at Pondichéry on 6 August. From there, Grenier sailed to Sumatra, arriving there on 9 September. He continued to Diego Garcia, where he arrived on 24, and returned to Port Louis on 6 October.

Grenier's new route allowed a one-month journey to India, dramatically cutting on the three-month route then known, which made a large detour South before sailing North-West. Grenier was also the first to survey the Seychelles. Publication of the route yielded a polemic between Grenier and Rochon, but the Académie de Marine ended up backing Grenier, and later exploration by Kerguelen confirmed Grenier's findings.

Grenier returned to France, where he arrived on 15 June 1770. In 1772, he sailed to Isle de France again on the frigate Belle Poule, along with Lapérouse and Saint-Haouen, and ferrying the new governor, Ternay. Grenier was promoted to Lieutenant during the journey, on 24 March 1772.

In October 1772, Belle Poule sailed North through the Second Nazareth Bank, West of Gratia, before turning towards the Seychelles and arriving at Mahé. She continued to Praslin, and then sailed to the Seven Brothers Islands, before arriving at Pondichéry and returning to Port-Louis.

In July 1773, Grenier departed again, sailing West of the Nazareth Bank, East of Gratia and Praslin, before arriving at Pondichéry and Manila. He was back at Isle de France on 15 April 1774.

Grenier was made a Knight in the Order of Saint Louis on 7 September 1776.

At the outbreak of the Anglo-French War in 1778, Grenier was serving on the 64-gun Sphinx. He took part in the Battle of Ushant, and was then given command of the frigate Boudeuse in the squadron under Estaing. On 22 January 1779, he captured the British corvette Weazle. He took part in the Battle of Grenada and in the Siege of Savannah in September 1779. In 1780, he was on convoy escort duty. Grenier was promoted to Captain on 9 May 1781, and served on the Bretagne. He then worked on supplies for Guichen's squadron.

Grenier retired from the Navy in 1789. He was a Freemason and member of the loge Saint-Jean d'Écosse du Contrat social.

== Works ==
- Grenier, Jacques (1797). L'Art de la guerre sur mer ou Tactique navale assujettie à de nouveaux principes et à un nouvel ordre de bataille. Paris.
