= Yves-Joseph de Kerguelen-Trémarec =

French Navy officer (1734–1797)

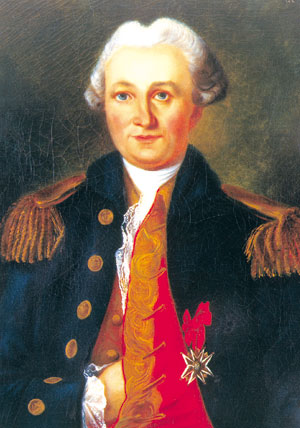
- Portrait of Kerguelen-Trémarec
- Born: 13 February 1734; Landudal, Brittany
- Died: 3 March 1797 (aged 63)
- Allegiance: Kingdom of France; French First Republic
- Branch: French Navy
- Service years: 1750–1796
- Rank: Counter admiral
- Conflicts: Seven Years' War; American Revolutionary War; French Revolutionary Wars; War of the First Coalition; Battle of Groix
- Other work: First voyage of Kerguelen; Second voyage of Kerguelen

Counter-Admiral Yves Joseph Marie de Kerguelen-Trémarec (13 February 1734 – 3 March 1797) was a French Navy officer. He discovered the Kerguelen Islands in 1772 during his first expedition to the southern Indian Ocean. Welcomed as a hero after his voyage and first discovery, Kerguelen fell out of favour after his second voyage and was cashiered in 1775 for violating Navy regulations. He was rehabilitated during the French Revolution. Kerguelen authored books about expeditions and about French naval battles of the American Revolutionary War.

== Biography ==
=== Early life ===
Kerguelen-Trémarec was born in Landudal, Brittany. During the Seven Years' War, he was a privateer, but without much success.

=== Rockall ===
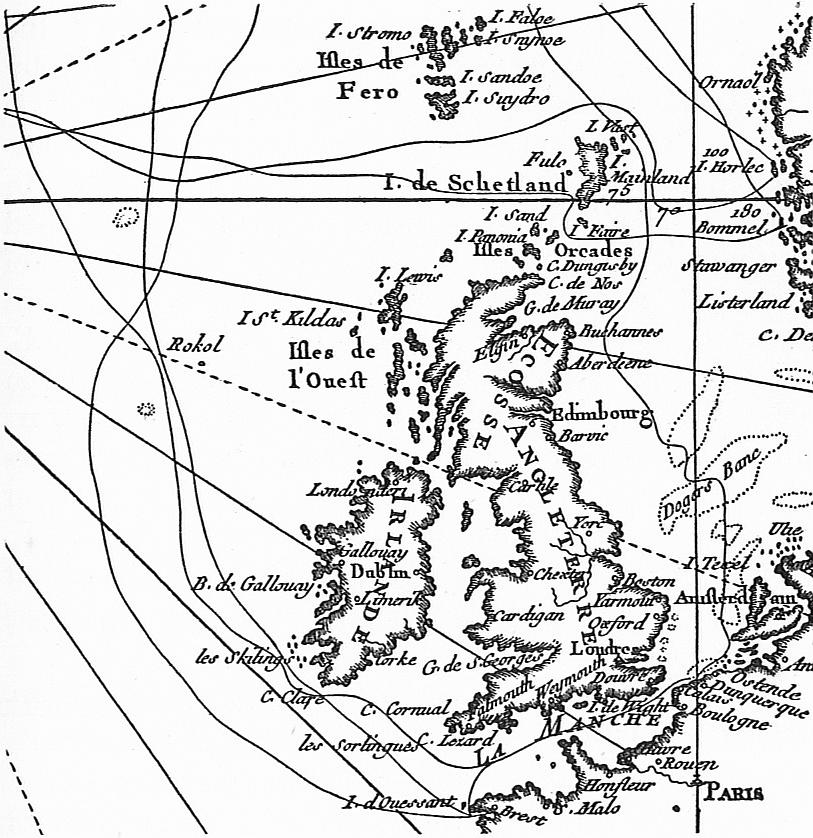
Rockall area, published 1771

In 1767 he sailed near Rockall, or Rokol. Although he may not have approached within sight of it, or even within 150 miles, he appears to have had good information regarding it. His charted position for it was only 16 miles north of its actual position and he accurately described its appearance and the nearby Helen's Reef: "East of Rokol, ¼ league away, there is a submerged rock over which the water breaks". In 1771, he published a map of the area.

=== Discovery of the Kerguelen Islands ===
In early 1772, he was assigned command of the third French expedition sent in search of the fabled Terra Australis with the fluyts Fortune and Gros Ventre. The expedition discovered the isolated Kerguelen Islands north of Antarctica in the southern Indian Ocean and claimed the archipelago for France before returning to Mauritius. He was accompanied by the naturalist Jean Guillaume Bruguière. On a follow-up expedition to the Kerguelen Islands in 1773, he was accompanied by the astronomer Joseph Lepaute Dagelet. Kerguelen, a supporter of slavery, used "Blacks in difficult moments in order to preserve his white crew".

In his report to Louis XV, he greatly overestimated the value of the Kerguelen Islands; consequently, the King sent him on a second expedition with the 64-gun Roland and the 32-gun frigate Oiseau, but was again unsuccessful in finding Terra Australis. By now, it had become clear that the Kerguelen Islands were desolate and quite useless, and certainly not Terra Australis. Upon his return, Kerguelen was court-martialled in Brest on 15 May 1775 by a council of war presided over by Vice-admiral Anne Antoine, Comte d'Aché for transporting 200 slaves on Roland from Madagascar to sell in French colonies in defiance of Louis XV, who had issued a regulation in 1727 forbidding French naval officers to trade in slaves. At the court-martial, his defence lawyer minimised Kerguelen's slave-trading activities by stating that it was only "Eight or nine negroes that the pilot’s assistant bought on Kerguelen’s behalf". Although several other naval officers had traded in slaves, he was found guilty on 25 May 1776 and sentenced to six years imprisonment.

=== French Revolution ===
During the French Revolution, he was seen as a victim of the ancien régime and restored to his position, taking part in the Battle of Groix. He retired in 1796 as a counter admiral and commander of Brest and died on 3 March 1797.

== Works ==
- Kerguelen-Trémarec, Yves-Joseph (1796). Relation d'un Voyage dans la Mer du Nord. La Découvrance. ISBN 2-84265-129-4.
- Kerguelen-Trémarec, Yves-Joseph (1796). Relation des combats et des évènements de la guerre maritime de 1778 entre la France et l'Angleterre (in French). Imprimerie de Patris.

== Notes, citations, and references ==
Notes

Citations

References

- Martin-Allanic, Jean-Étienne (1964). Bougainville Navigateur et les Découvertes de son Temps (in French). Paris: Presses Universitaires de France. ISBN 9787240006214. OCLC 729759706.
- Lyubomir Ivanov and Nusha Ivanova. Bouvet and Kerguelen. In: The World of Antarctica. Generis Publishing, 2022. pp. 70–72. ISBN 979-8-88676-403-1
