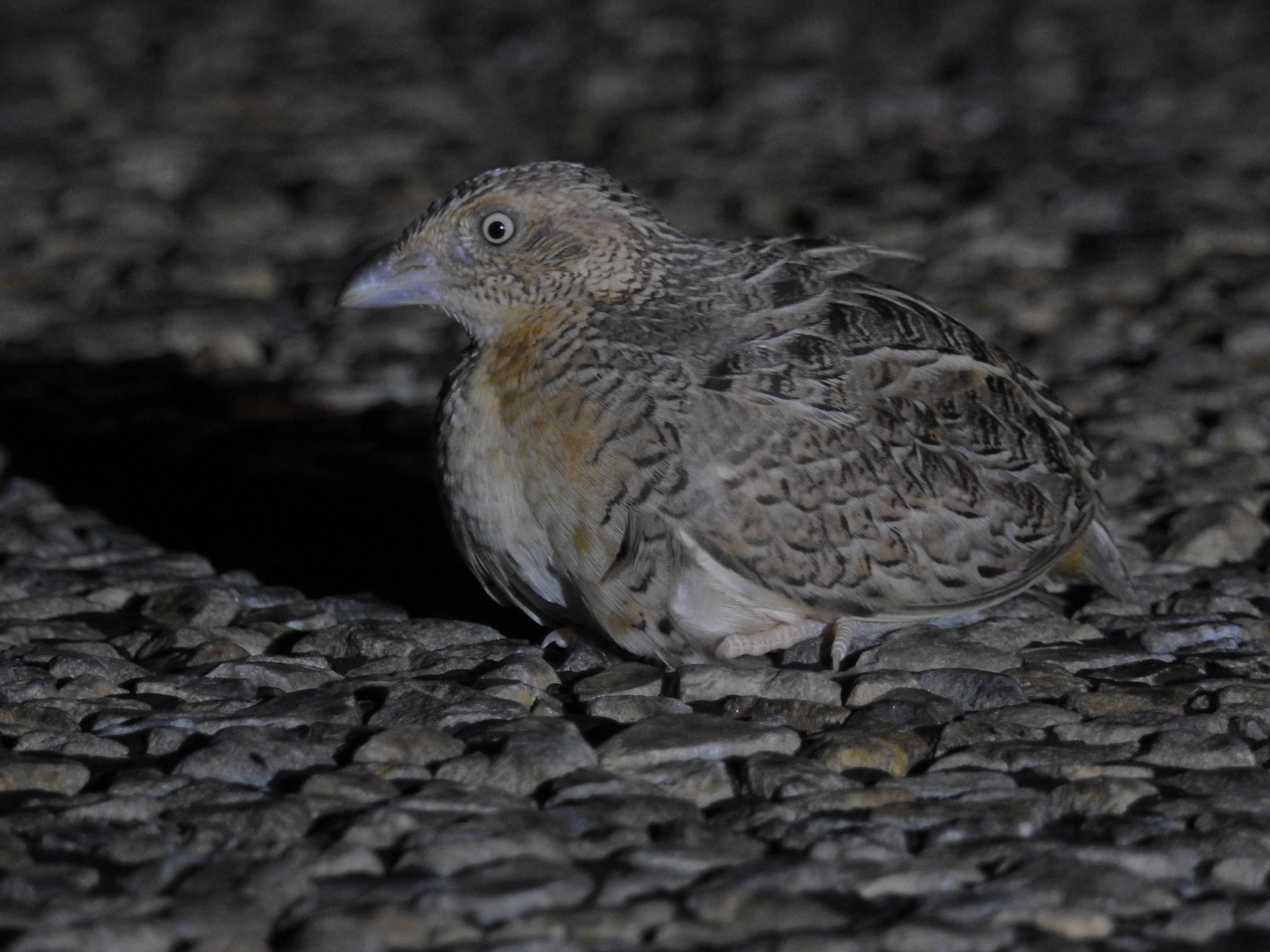

Conservation status
- Least Concern (IUCN 3.1)

Scientific classification
- Kingdom: Animalia
- Phylum: Chordata
- Class: Aves
- Order: Charadriiformes
- Family: Turnicidae
- Genus: Turnix
- Species: T. pyrrhothorax

Binomial name
- Turnix pyrrhothorax (Gould, 1841)
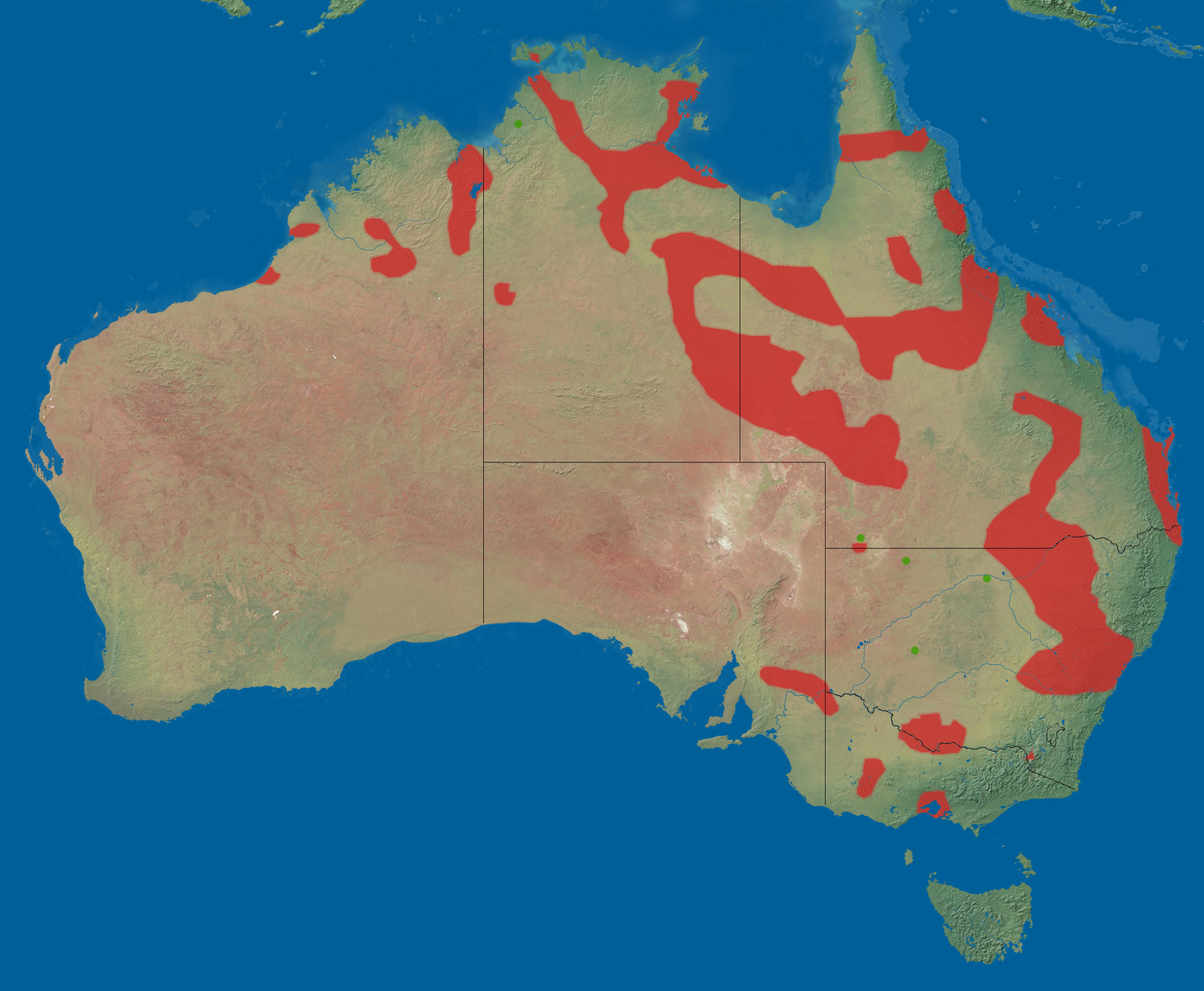
- The Distribution of the red-chested buttonquail. Green denotes vagrant records

= Red-chested buttonquail =

Species of bird

The red-chested buttonquail (Turnix pyrrhothorax) is a species of bird in the family Turnicidae. It is endemic to Australia. The species is generally regarded as widespread, although uncommon, in New South Wales, Queensland, northern Western Australia and the Northern Territory, and classified as Vulnerable in Victoria.

The red-chested buttonquail is a small reddish-brown, ground-running bird, which avoids flying. The female is brighter and slightly larger in size and weight. The female is polyandrous, initiating courtship among several males and expelling rival females from her territory.

== Taxonomy ==
The red-chested buttonquail was originally described by ornithologist John Gould in 1841, Aberdeen, New South Wales, Australia. It was originally named Hemipodius pyrrhothorax.

The red-chested buttonquail belongs to the bird family Turnicidae, which resemble, but are unrelated to the Quail or Phasianidae. There are 17 species in the family Turnicidae, with two genera, Turnix and Ortyxelos. The red-chested buttonquail belongs to the genus Turnix. The red-chested buttonquail is usually regarded as monotypic, but recent proposal to treat T. worcesteri and T. everetti as subspecies of present species. Proposed subspecies berneyi (NW Australia) and intermedia (Queensland) are no longer recognized, because they are based on individual rather than geographical variation.

== Description ==
Adult red-chested buttonquails are 12–16 cm long with males weighing 27-46 g and females 31-83 g. The species is smaller in size than the painted button-quail. Viewed from behind, red-chested buttonquail look uniformly pale grey across the upper-wings and back. Side-on, the rufous wash on the upper-parts of the red-chested buttonquail is obvious. From close range its thick blue-grey beak, pink legs and feet, and pale eyes can be seen.

Females are brighter than males, with rufous of underparts brighter and extending over throat to sides of head, and narrower and denser barring on flanks that rarely extend onto breast as scalloping. Juveniles are smaller, darker above with white streaks and dark barring, bold white spots on wing-coverts, underparts white with rufous-brown gorget and upper breast scalloped.

The red-chested buttonquail is more commonly sighted in woodland habitats, than grassland habitats. When disturbed it scuttles through the grass or flies low with whirring wings often showing its white flanks before it drops to cover. The species generally prefers to stay close to the ground and avoids flying.

=== Similar species ===
The red-chested buttonquail is most easily distinguished by its uniformed grey-brown tone on its upper side and orange chestnut flakes. While the little buttonquail (Turnix velox) can be recognised by its distinctly reddish-brown or pinkish toned under-body and the contrasting tones between parts of its wings. The red-backed buttonquail (Turnix maculosus) has a darker slate-grey or blackish tone on its upper side and has dark underparts except for a contrasting wing panel.

== Distribution and habitat ==
Red-chested buttonquails are found along the eastern side of Australia and the top of the Northern Territory and Western Australia. They are not found in Tasmania.

The species' preferred habitat is in dense grasslands, and open, grassy, woodland of Acacia (Fabaceae), river red gum (Eucalyptus camaldulensis) and Black box (E. largiflorens) or Melaleuca (Myrtaceae), but also in crops and weedy fields with dense ground cover, and from coastal plains. They occur between sea level and 1000m above sea level. They are generally found in moister, denser vegetation cover than the little buttonquail, but also inhabit semi-arid zones. The common factors in their desired habitat seems to be bare ground and abundant leaf litter, little or no understorey, patches of tussock grass or sedges. The birds normally forage in open area of deep leaf litter, and retreat to the undercover of tussocks or woody debris if threatened.

== Behaviour ==
=== Feeding ===
The red-chested buttonquail feeds on seeds (grasses, Triticum, Panicum and Malvaceae) and insects (cockroaches, ants, flies and larvae). Foraging occurs throughout the day, although the species has been said to be nocturnal and crepuscular. They make platelets while foraging, which is typical for the genus Turnix. They glean and scratch in leaf litter, while rotating on the spot by pivoting on one foot and raking with the other. Occasionally pecking at the ground, which can sometimes be detected in dry periods by the small puffs of dust they cause while making the platelets. They have been recorded feeding alone, in pairs or small groups of up to five.

=== Breeding ===
The species breeds within tussock grasslands, spinifex or Melaleuca woodland, pastures of native grass, standing crops and stubble. The red-chested buttonquails are solitary breeders and females are sequentially polyandrous. The female usually constructs the nest and it is depression lined with grass, hooked, and shelter by grass tussock.

Eggs are laid in February–July/September in the north, and September–February in the south. Usually four white eggs with chestnut-brown markings are laid at one- or two-day intervals. Incubation lasts 13–18 days from completion of clutch. Males incubate and care for chicks alone. Chicks leave the nest precocial and nidifugous. They are grey-brown with dark and pale dorsal stripes. They reach adult size in 6–8 weeks and adult-like plumage at 2–3 months. They reach sexual maturity at 6 months.

=== Vocalization and communication ===
The female is known to display a repetitive advertising call of "oom" note, which increases in pitch and intensity. Disturbed birds utter a sharp chattering call. Adults are also known to communicate various soft whistles and chirrups. Juvenile birds have a weak, domestic, chicken-like call if handled.

=== Migration ===
Red-chested buttonquails are partial migrants. Red-chested buttonquails are known to have seasonal migration between inland arid regions to semi-arid areas nearer the coast, from winter to spring and summer. Some populations remain in one region all year round. The amount of movement is influenced by factors such as rainfall, plant growth and food availability.

=== In captivity ===
In captivity, if the enclosure is too small, the red-chested buttonquail is known to become aggressive. Males may fight each other's offspring, while females may kill offspring of other females, so that the male will re-mate.

== Conservation status and threats ==
The red-chested buttonquail is classified as Least concern by the IUCN. It is not listed as threatened by the Australian Environment Protection and Biodiversity Conservation Act 1999, but its conservation status varies from state to state within Australia. It is listed as "threatened" by the Victorian Flora and Fauna Guarantee Act (1988). Under this Act, an Action Statement for the recovery and future management of this species has not yet been prepared. On the 2007 advisory list of threatened vertebrate fauna in Victoria, the red-chested buttonquail is listed as vulnerable.

The red-chested buttonquail is thought to be uncommon but secure throughout the rest of its Australian range. This species was formerly hunted for food and sport, and occasionally killed by feral pests for example cats and foxes. The major threat to this species is loss of suitable habitat. This species has not adapted to crop and farmland habitats to the extent of many other Buttonquail species. Red-chested buttonquail who nest in crops have been known to lose their clutches due to harvesting.

This species generally ranges from uncommon to locally common, with densities of 0·2–5 birds/ha reported. In the northern parts of its distribution range the species is frequent or at least widespread, but considered to be only sparsely distributed over much of Queensland, especially in coastal areas. In the southern parts of its distribution range the species is declining or suspected to be declining. The species is very uncommon in South Australia, infrequently recorded in New South Wales (where threatened in west of state) and very few records in Victoria. The species decline in Victoria is highly due to the conversion of native grasslands to agriculture, with 95% of such habitat having been destroyed or degraded in Victoria.

Grazing by livestock, crop and pasture production, and the removal of woody debris for firewood, are threatening processes for the Red-chested buttonquail. Desired habitats of the Red-chested buttonquail such as ground covers, tussock grass, sedges and woody debris, should be managed to ensure suitable habitat conditions for this species remain.
