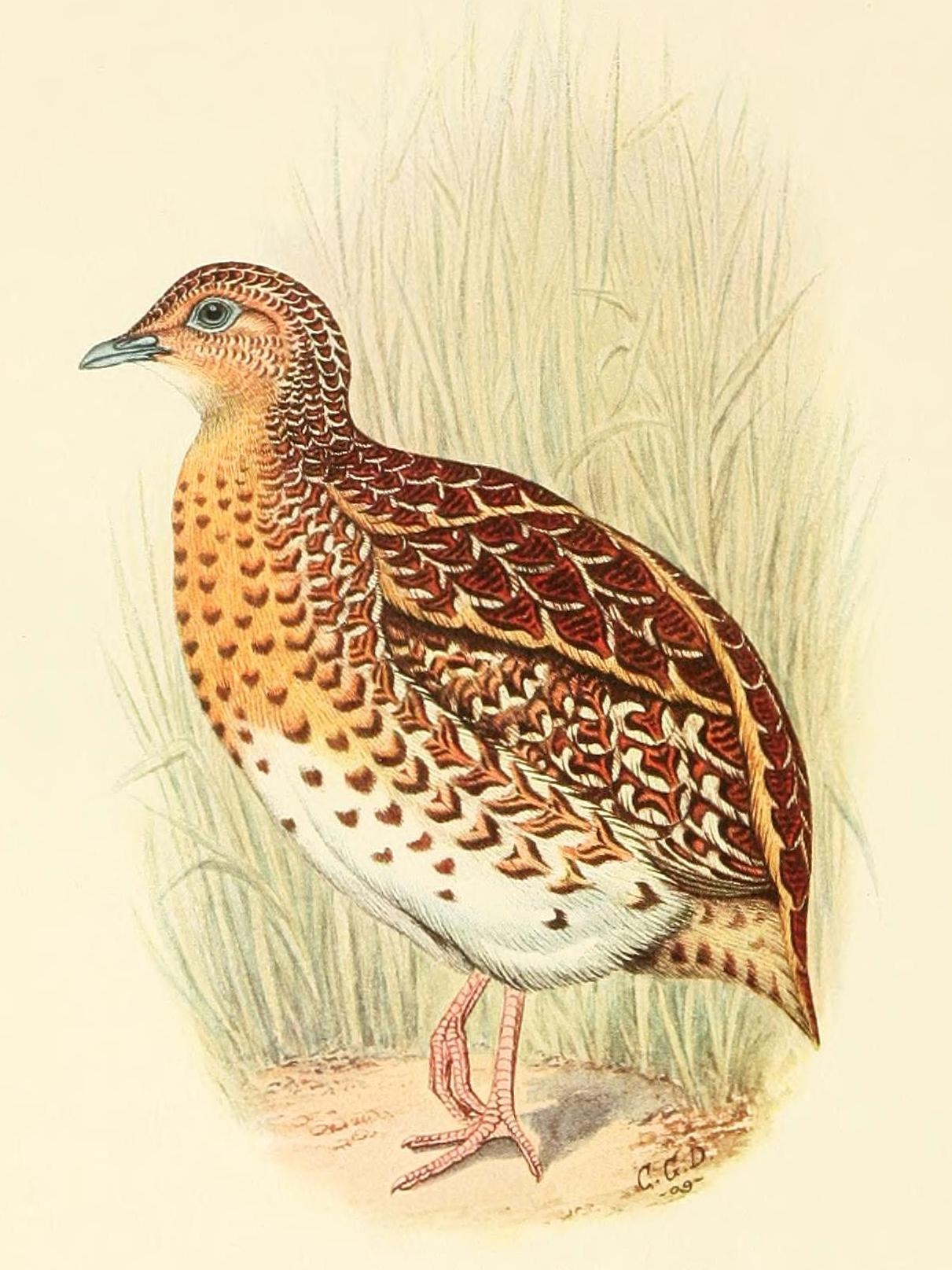

Conservation status
- Least Concern (IUCN 3.1)

Scientific classification
- Kingdom: Animalia
- Phylum: Chordata
- Class: Aves
- Order: Charadriiformes
- Family: Turnicidae
- Genus: Turnix
- Species: T. hottentottus

Binomial name
- Turnix hottentottus Temminck, 1815

= Fynbos buttonquail =

Species of bird

The Fynbos buttonquail (Turnix hottentottus) is a bird in the family Turnicidae formerly considered conspecific with the black-rumped buttonquail (Turnix nanus). There are no subspecies.

== Name ==
Several authorities still refer to this species as the Hottentot Buttonquail, however, as the word "Hottentot" is an offensive term for the Khoisan people, there has been a movement to change the vernacular name. The new name highlights the specific habitat requirements of this species in the Fynbos of the Cape Floristic Region.

== Distribution and habitat ==
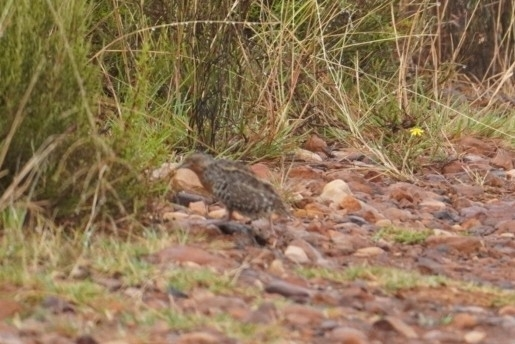
In natural habitat

The species is endemic to South Africa and is found along the south coast from Cape Town to Algoa Bay in Eastern Cape province where it occurs in mountain fynbos where vegetation is relatively sparse. A 1994 survey resulted in an estimate of c.310-420 birds in 25 square kilometres (9.7 sq mi) of montane fynbos habitat in Cape of Good Hope Nature Reserve. The lack of records suggest that this may be an overestimate, and extrapolation of a much lower density estimate from a 1990 study would result in a total population across the Western Cape of just 400 birds. The total population is therefore uncertain, but given the lack of recent records is assumed to be very small. It is precautionarily estimated to lie within the band of 250-999 mature individuals, with no more than 250 individuals in the largest subpopulation.
