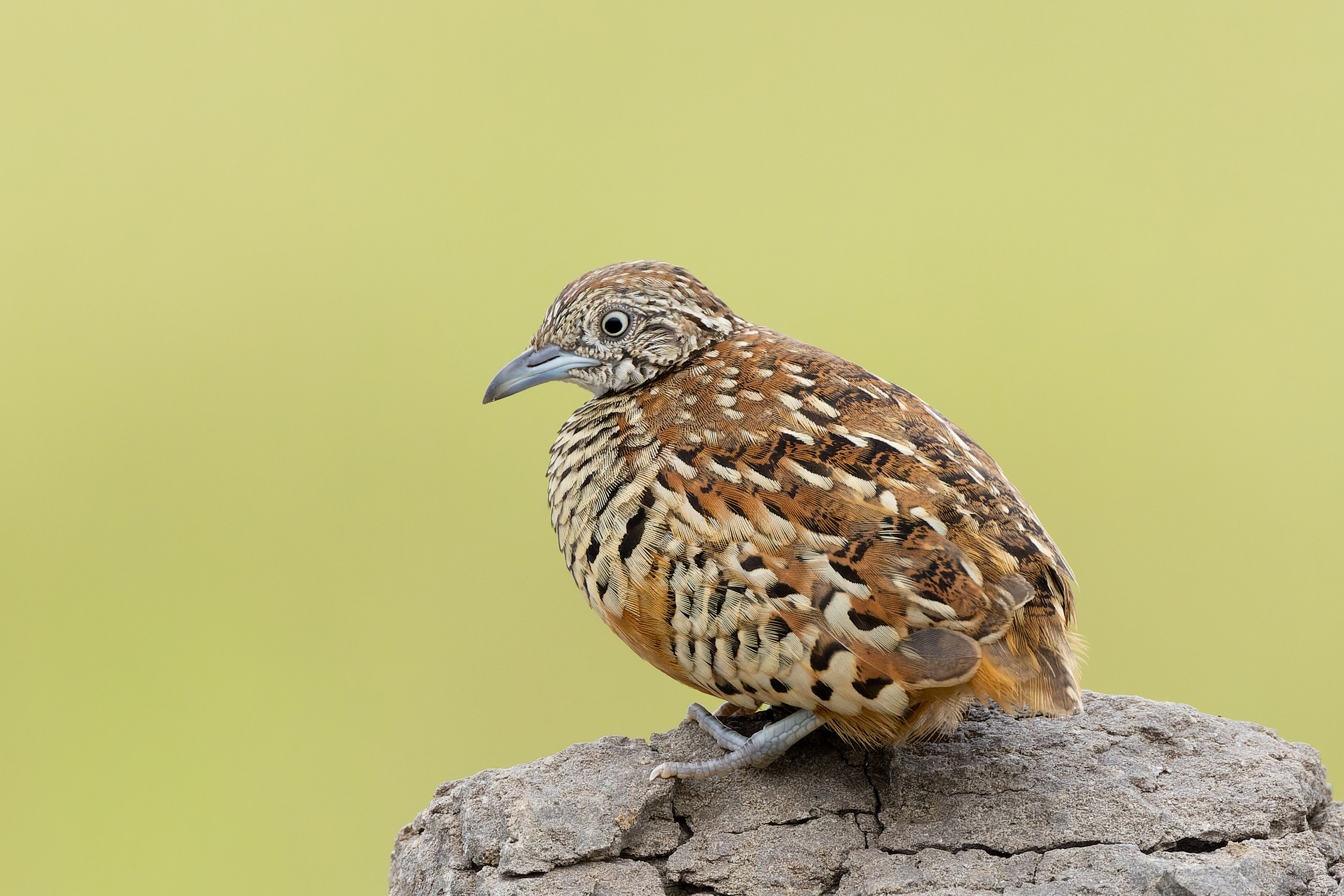
- In Bhigwan, Maharashtra, India

Conservation status
- Least Concern (IUCN 3.1)

Scientific classification
- Kingdom: Animalia
- Phylum: Chordata
- Class: Aves
- Order: Charadriiformes
- Family: Turnicidae
- Genus: Turnix
- Species: T. suscitator

Binomial name
- Turnix suscitator (Gmelin, JF, 1789)

Synonyms
- Tetrao suscitator Gmelin, JF, 1789

= Barred buttonquail =

Species of bird

The barred buttonquail or common bustard-quail (Turnix suscitator) is a species of buttonquail, one of a small family (Turnicidae) of birds which resemble, but are not closely related to, the true quails. This species is resident from India across tropical Asia to south China, Indonesia and the Philippines.

== Taxonomy ==
The barred buttonquail was formally described in 1789 by the German naturalist Johann Friedrich Gmelin in his revised and expanded edition of Carl Linnaeus's Systema Naturae. He placed it with the grouse like birds in the genus Tetrao and coined the binomial name Tetrao suscitator. Gmelin cited the English ornithologist Francis Willughby who in 1678 had described and illustrated the "Indian Quail of Brontius" from the Island of Java. The barred buttonquail is now placed in the genus Turnix that was introduced in 1791 by French naturalist in Pierre Bonnaterre. The genus name is an abbreviation of the genus Coturnix. The specific epithet suscitator is Latin and means "awakening".

Sixteen subspecies are recognised.

- T. s. plumbipes (Hodgson, 1837) – Nepal to northeast India and north Myanmar
- T. s. bengalensis Blyth, 1852 – central, southwest Bengal (northeast India)
- T. s. taigoor (Sykes, 1832) – India (except above)
- T. s. leggei Baker, ECS, 1920 – Sri Lanka
- T. s. okinavensis Phillips, AR, 1947 – south Kyushu to Ryukyu Islands (south Japan)
- T. s. rostratus Swinhoe, 1865 – Taiwan
- T. s. blakistoni (Swinhoe, 1871) – east Myanmar to south China and north Indochina
- T. s. pallescens Robinson & Baker, ECS, 1928 – central south Myanmar
- T. s. thai Deignan, 1946 – northwest, central Thailand
- T. s. atrogularis (Eyton, 1839) – south Myanmar, south Thailand and Malay Peninsula
- T. s. suscitator (Gmelin, JF, 1789) – Sumatra, Belitung and Bangka Island (east of south Sumatra), Java, Bawean (north of east Java) and Bali
- T. s. powelli Guillemard, 1885 – Lombok to Alor Island (west, central Lesser Sunda Islands)
- T. s. rufilatus Wallace, 1865 – Sulawesi
- T. s. haynaldi Blasius, W, 1888 – Palawan group (southwest Philippines)
- T. s. fasciatus (Temminck, 1815) – Luzon, Mindoro, Masbate and Sibuyan Island (north, central Philippines)
- T. s. nigrescens Tweeddale, 1878 – Cebu, Guimaras, Negros and Panay (central west Philippines)

== Description ==
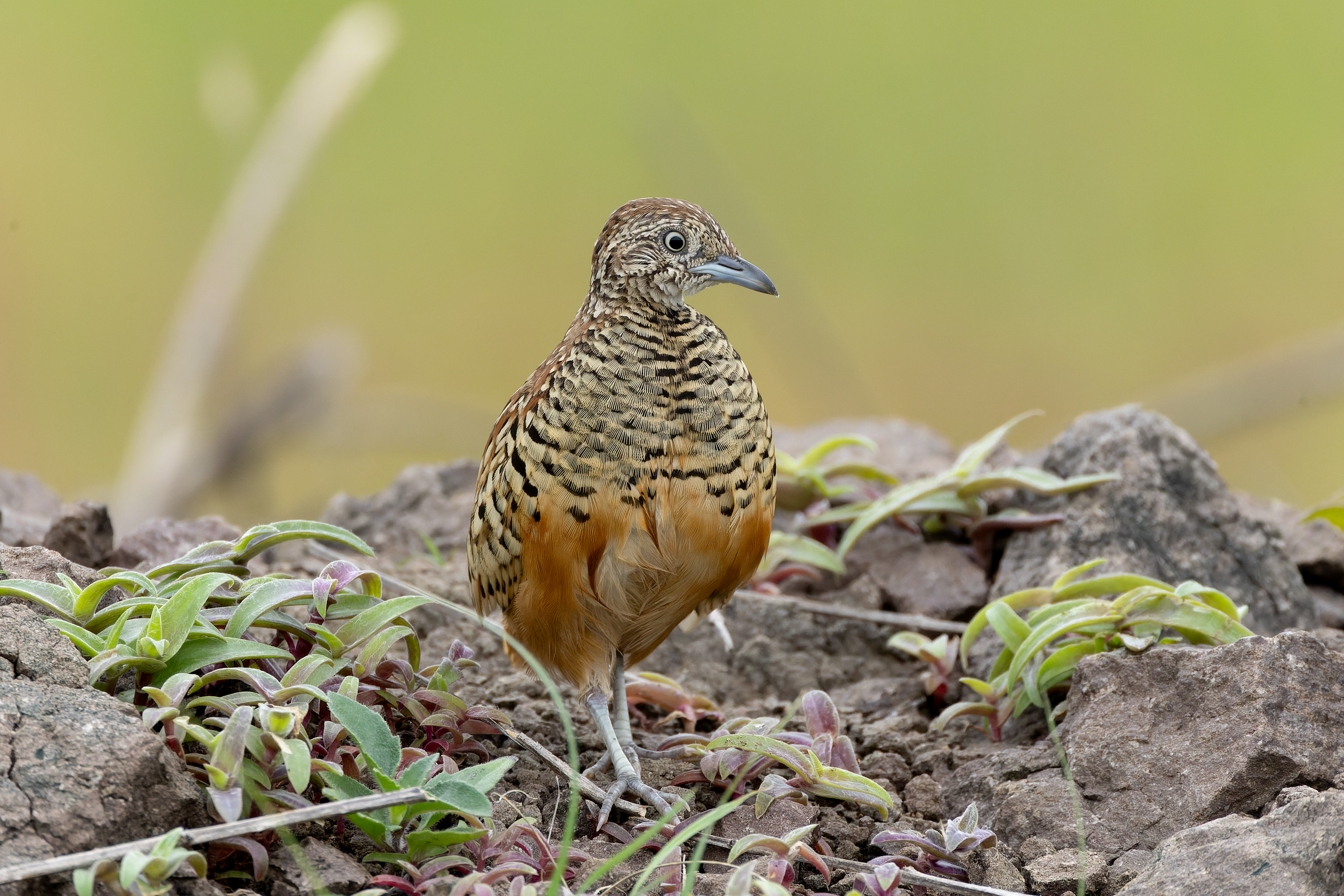
Male in Bhigwan, Maharashtra, India

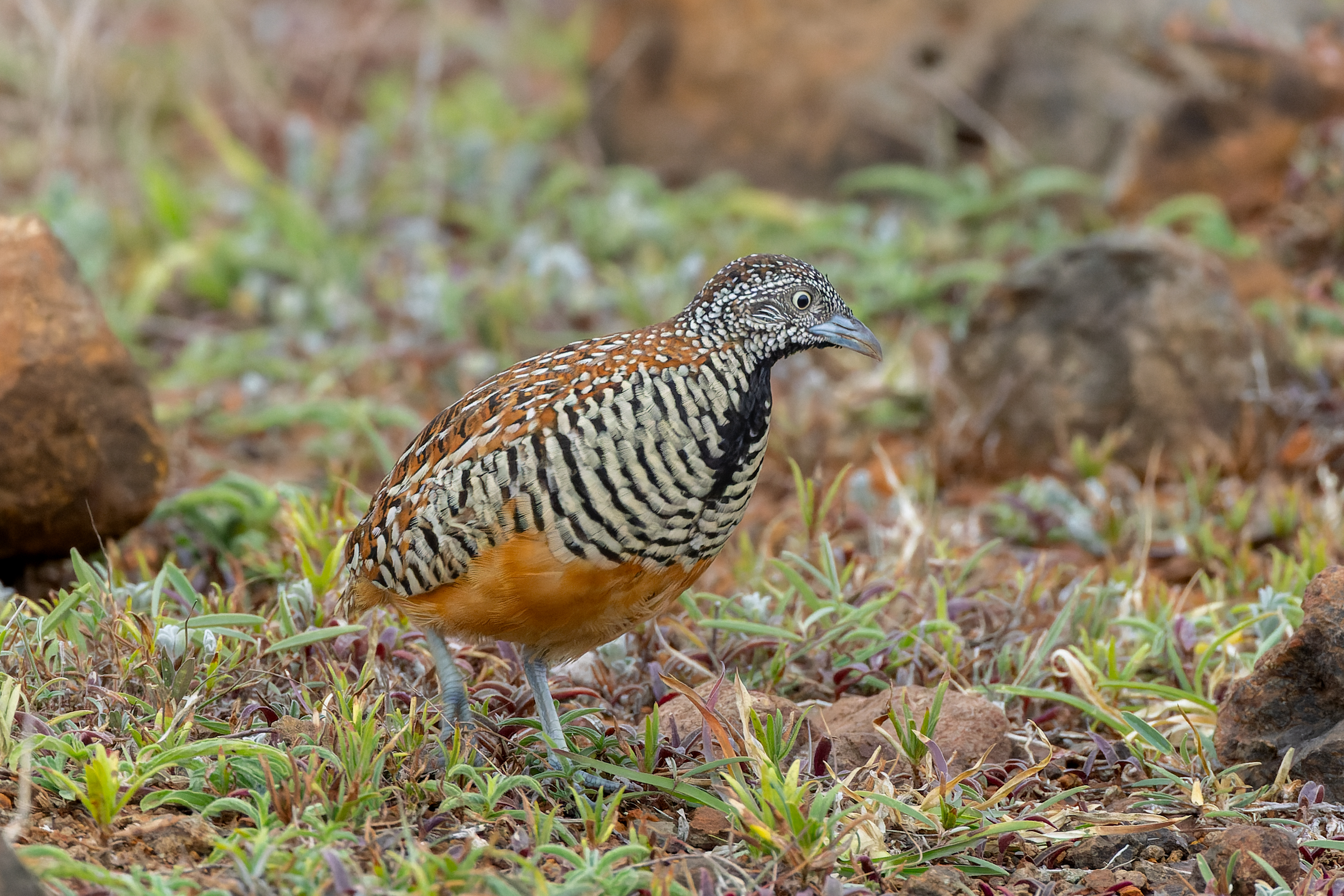
Female in Bhigwan, Maharashtra, India

A typical little buttonquail, rufous-brown above, rusty and buff below. Chin, throat and breast closely barred with black. Female larger and more richly coloured, with throat and middle of breast black. The blue-grey bill and legs, and yellowish white eyes are diagnostic, as are also the pale buff shoulder-patches on the wings when in flight. Absence of hind toe distinguishes Bustard and Button quails from true quails. Pairs, in scrub and grassland. The calls are a motorcycle-like drr-r-r-r-r-r and a loud hoon- hoon-hoon.

== Distribution and habitat ==
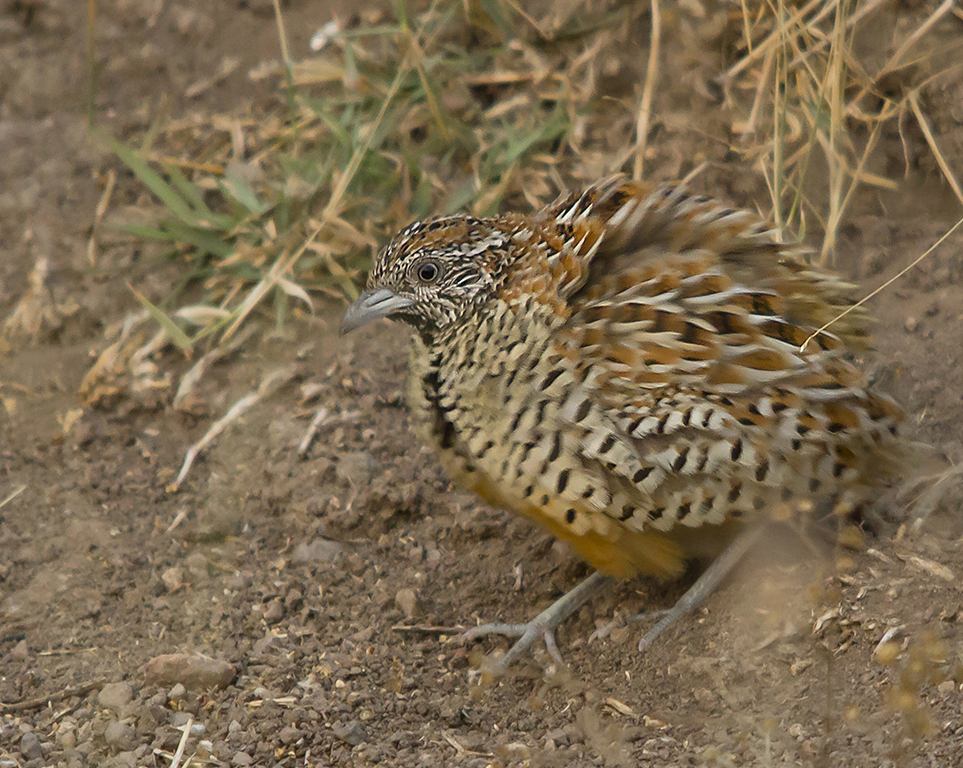
Dust bathing

The species occurs throughout India up to elevations of about 2,500 m (8,200 ft) in the Himalayas, Sri Lanka, Bangladesh, Burma, Indonesia, the Philippines and most of Southeast Asia. There are four geographical races that differ somewhat in colour. It is found in most habitats except dense forest and desert, in particular, scrub jungle, light deciduous forest and farmlands.

== Breeding ==
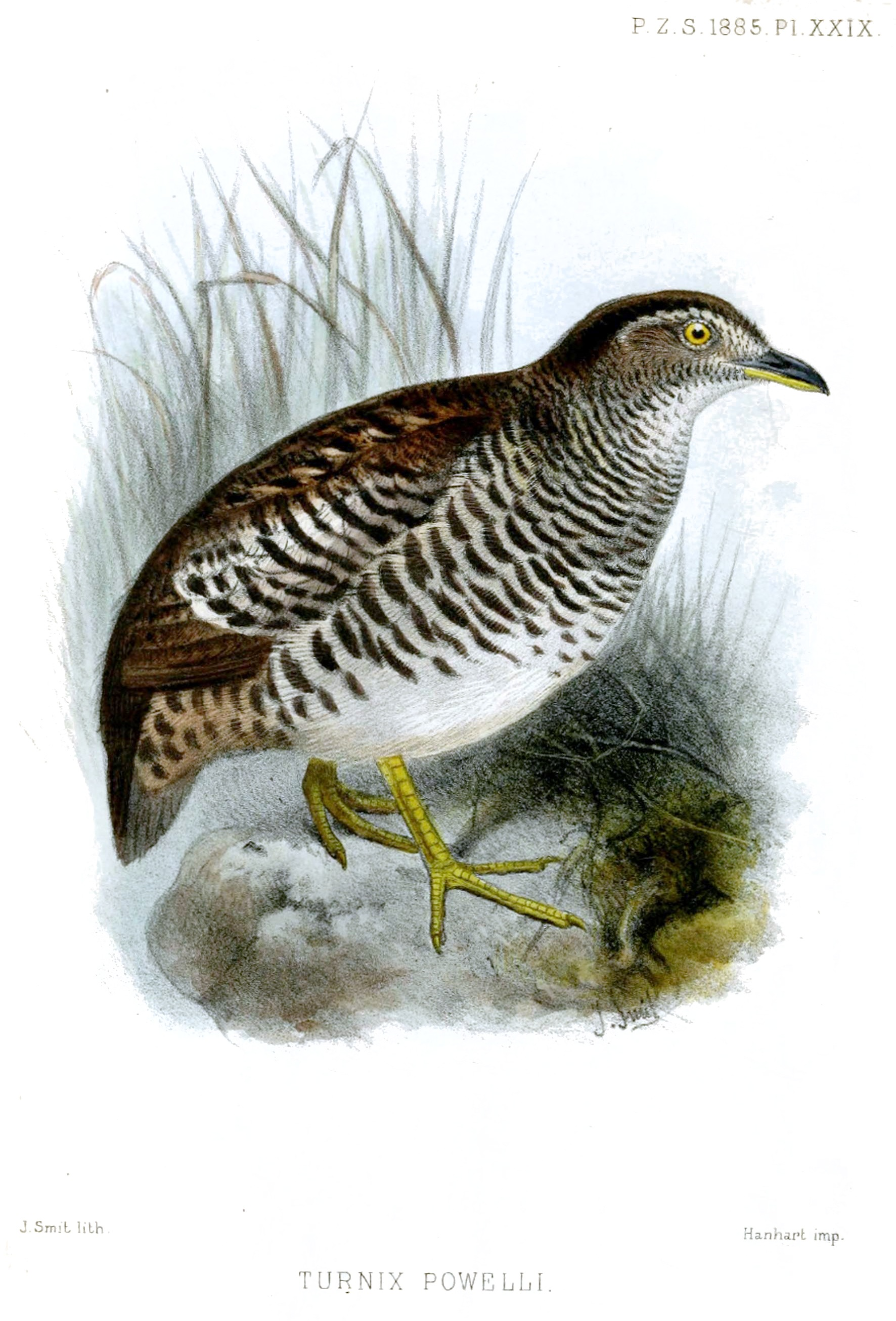
ssp. powelli

Buttonquails differ from true quails chiefly in the female being polyandrous The female is the brighter of the sexes, initiates courtship and builds the ground nest. She fights with other females for the possession of a cock, uttering a loud drumming drr-r-r-r-r as a challenge to rival hens and also to announce herself to a cock. Eggs when laid are left to be incubated by the cock who also tends the young, which can run as soon as they are hatched. The hen goes off to acquire another mate, and perhaps yet another, and so on, though evidently only one at a time. They breed practically throughout the year, varying locally. The nest is a grass-lined scrape or depression in scrub jungle or crops, often arched over by surrounding grass. The usual clutch comprises 3 or 4 greyish white eggs, profusely speckled with reddish brown or blackish purple.

== Conservation ==
Widespread and common throughout its large range, the barred buttonquail is evaluated as being of Least Concern on the IUCN Red List of threatened species.
