= Turnipax =

Turnipax Temporal range: Rupelian

Scientific classification
- Kingdom: Animalia
- Phylum: Chordata
- Class: Aves
- Order: Charadriiformes
- Family: Turnicidae
- Genus: †Turnipax; Mayr, 2000

Type species
- †T. dissipata Mayr, 2000

Other species
- †T. oechslerorum Mayr and Knopf, 2007

Extinct species of Oligocene bird from Europe

Turnipax is an extinct genus of buttonquail from the Oligocene Rupelian epoch. The type species, T. dissipata, was found near the village of Céreste-en-Luberon in France. A second species, T. oechslerorum, was described based on a nearly complete and slightly dissociated skeleton found south of Wiesloch, Germany.

== Discovery and species ==
The type species was described by Mayr (2000) after a strongly dissociated skeleton preserving vertebrae, ribs, humeri, coracoids, scapulae, furcula, pelvis and the legs from Rupelian aged deposits near Céreste-en-Luberon village, southern France. The genus name is a combination of Scolopax, a genus of charadriiform and Turnix, a genus of turnicid. This name reflects both charadriiform and turnicid characters of the species. The species name comes from the Latin dissipatus, meaning "scattered" or "dispersed". This refers to the specimen's preservation.

In 2007, Mayr and Knopf named a second species, T. oechslerorum after an almost complete slightly dissociated skeleton that only lacks the head and the right foot. The specimen was found in the lower Oligocene Frauenweiler fossil site, near the Wiesloch town, southern Germany. The species name honors Annette and Harald Oechsler, who significantly contributed to the discovery of the Frauenweiler fossils.

== Classification ==
The new family Turnipacidae was originally created for T. dissipata and tentatively Cerestenia pulchrapenna, another bird species from Céreste. This family was placed within Charadriiformes. The high similarities with Turnicidae were already noted. Mayr and Knopf (2007) stated that Turnipax was a stem-lineage representative of Turnicidae. For these reasons, the family Turnipacidae was synonymized with Turnicidae. However, they concluded that Cerestenia was not well-preserved enough to be confidently attributed to Turnicidae. Later studies included Cerestenia as a stem Turnicidae, just as Turnipax. This study also noted that the two genus possess a mixt of derived turnicid features and ancestral charadriiform features.

== Paleoecology ==
The holotype of T. oechslerorum preserves several gastroliths. This suggests at least a facultatively granivorous diet. Modern buttonquails are omnivorous; they feed on various seeds, plant matter and invertebrates. They also ingest grit and small pebbles to aid digestion.

The Frauenweiler fossil site, part of the Rauenberg Lagerstätte, is a clay pit that represents marine deposits. These were likely deposited during a transgression caused by rifting activities. The site is mostly known for its fish fauna. Bird fossils include aquatic species such as the loon Colymboides? metzleri and the diomedeoidid Rupelornis. Few terrestrial birds have also been found. The Rauenberg Lagerstätte is similar to the Oligocene Luberon area where T. dissipata was found.
