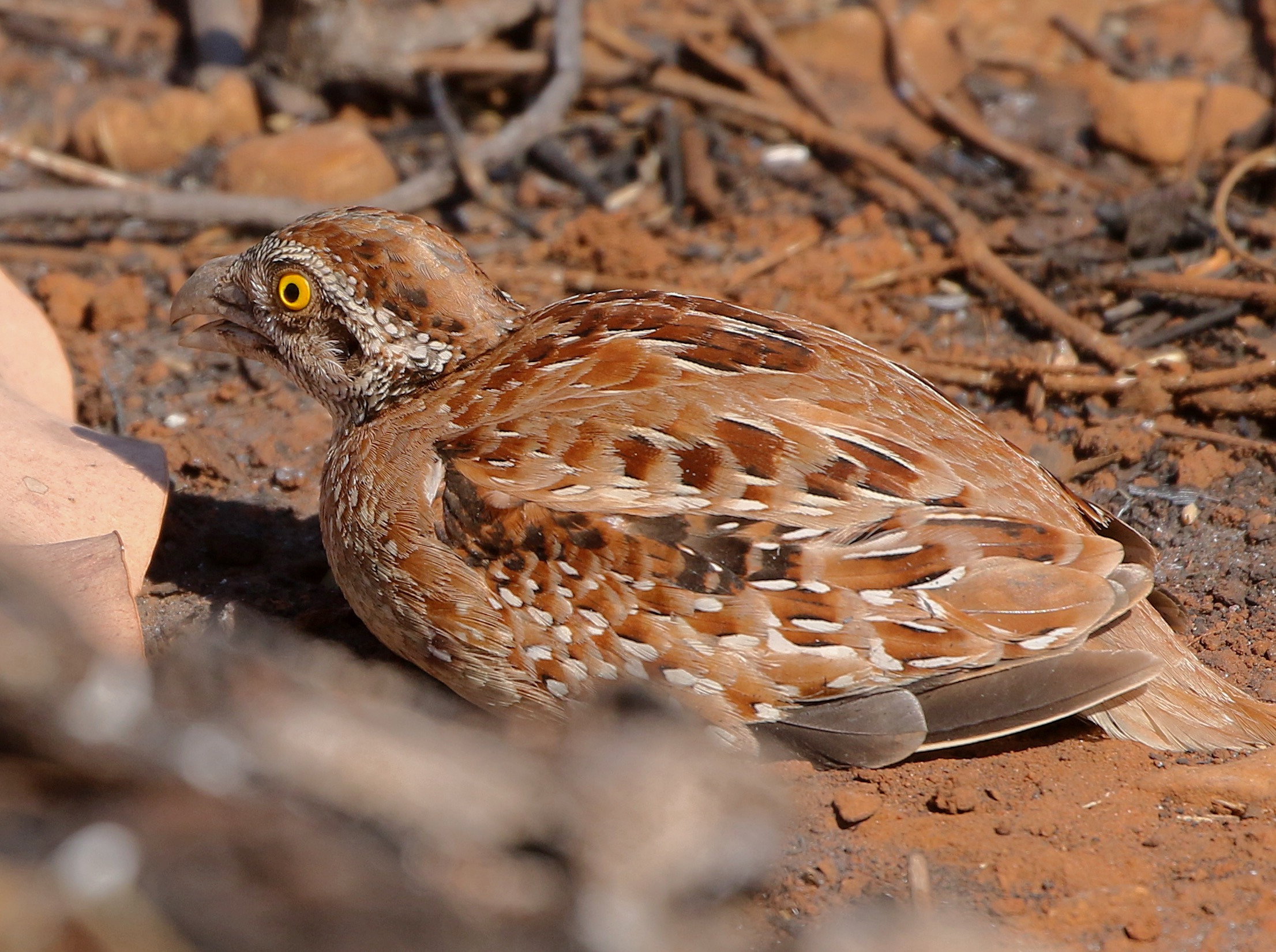

Conservation status
- Least Concern (IUCN 3.1)

Scientific classification
- Kingdom: Animalia
- Phylum: Chordata
- Class: Aves
- Order: Charadriiformes
- Family: Turnicidae
- Genus: Turnix
- Species: T. castanotus

Binomial name
- Turnix castanotus (Gould, 1840)
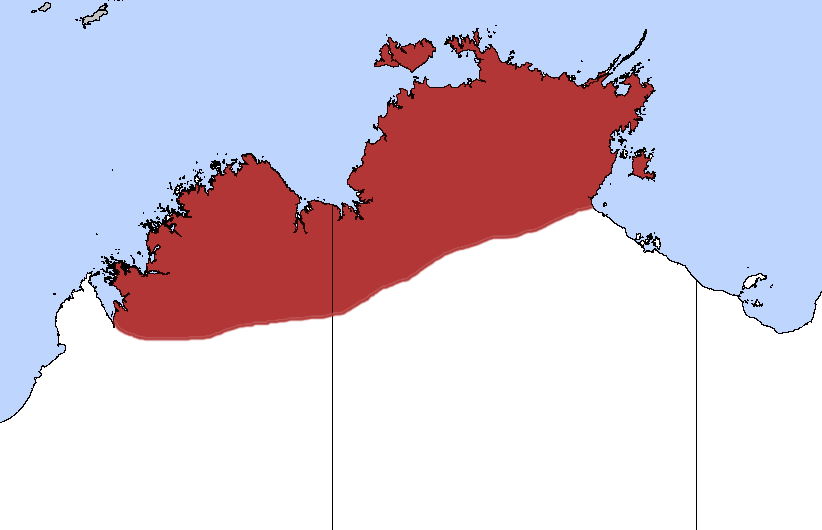
- Distribution of the chestnut-backed buttonquail

Synonyms
- Hemipodius castanotus Gould

= Chestnut-backed buttonquail =

Species of bird

The chestnut-backed buttonquail (Turnix castanotus) is a species of bird in the family Turnicidae. It is endemic to Australia.

== Taxonomy ==
John Gould described the species in 1840, from a specimen collected by Benjamin Bynoe, ship's surgeon of HMS Beagle, from northwestern Australia, as Hemipodius castanotus. English zoologist George Gray placed it in the genus Turnix in 1870. William Robert Ogilvie-Grant corrected the name to Turnix castanonota in 1889. Three subspecies were described by Gregory Mathews, but all are now considered as invalid and merely individual variants.

== Etymology ==
"Chestnut-backed buttonquail" has been designated the official name by the International Ornithologists' Union (IOC). The species name is derived from the Ancient Greek words kastanon "chestnut" and noton "back". Gould called it "chestnut-backed hemipode" in 1848, noting the colonists called it "thick-billed quail". The buttonquail species were generally known as "quail" (hence "chestnut-backed quail" ) until the RAOU promoted the current usage of "buttonquail" in 1978, which was then universally adopted.

== Distribution and habitat ==
Native to northern Australia, the species ranges from the Dampier Peninsula in Western Australia across to Westmoreland Station in the Gulf Country of northwestern Queensland, with possible records from Gregory Downs and Augustus Downs further east. It is also native to Melville Island and Groote Eylandt. It was common around Borroloola and McArthur River, but not currently. Its existence in Queensland was only confirmed in 2020.

Its natural habitats are low grasslands and Eucalyptus forests and woodland, favouring quartzite-sandstone ridges, plateaus and escarpments, mostly (but not always) in areas that receive over 800 mm (31 in) summer rainfall.

== Behaviour ==
The usual sex roles are reversed in the buttonquail genus (Turnix), as the larger and more brightly-coloured female mates with multiple male partners and leaves them to incubate the eggs. The female lays a clutch of 1–5 (usually 4) pyriform eggs, which are glossy-white with sparse small dark blotches.
