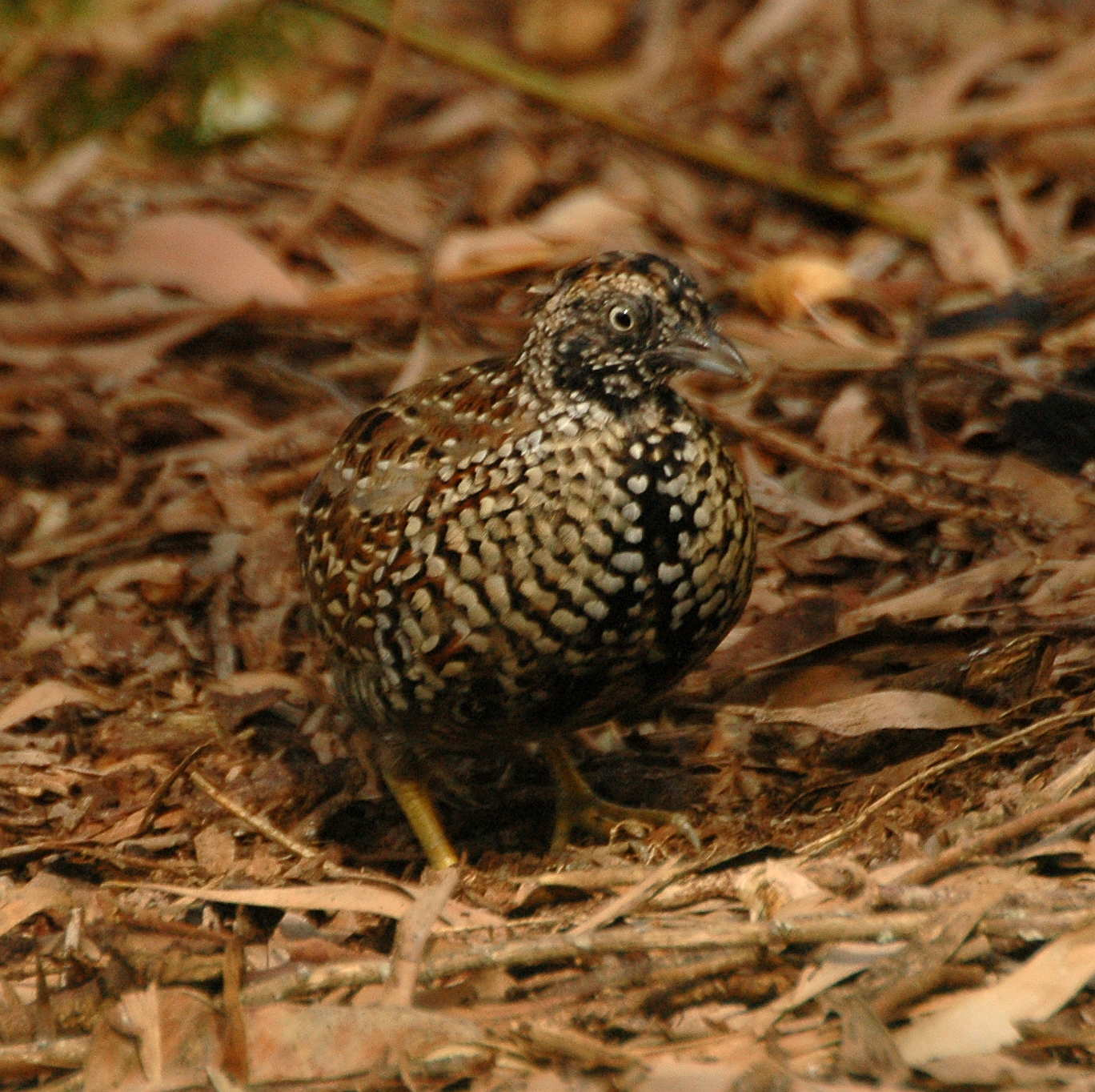
- Black-breasted buttonquail (Turnix melanogaster)

Scientific classification
- Kingdom: Animalia
- Phylum: Chordata
- Class: Aves
- Order: Charadriiformes
- Suborder: Lari
- Family: Turnicidae; Gray, GR, 1840

Type species
- Tetrao gibraltaricus Gmelin, 1788

Genera
- Turnix Bonnaterre, 1791; Ortyxelos Vieillot, 1825
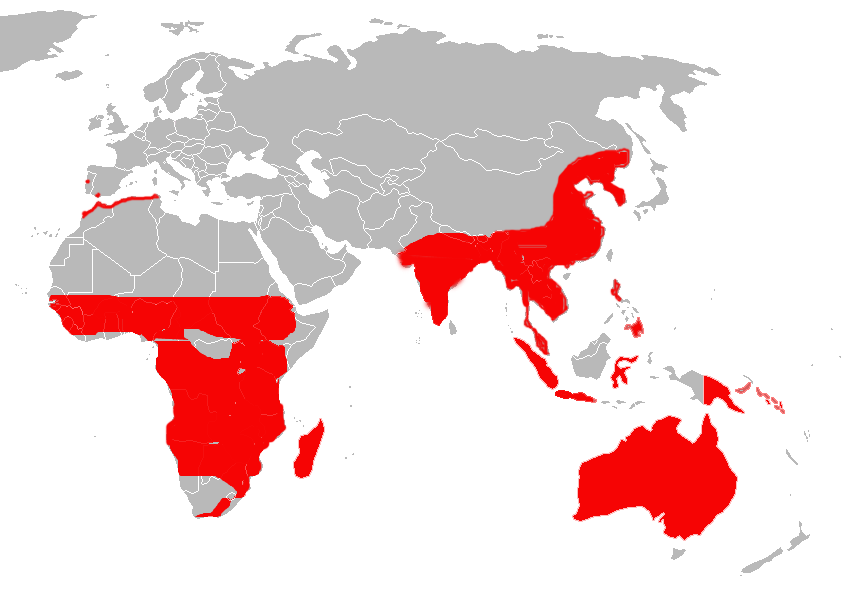
- Distribution of the buttonquails

= Buttonquail =

Family of birds

Buttonquail or hemipodes are members of a small family of ground birds, Turnicidae, in the order Charadriiformes. Despite their name and resemblance, they bear no taxonomic relationship to Old World quail of the tribe Coturnicini under the order Galliformes, including the species often called "button quail".

There are 18 species in two genera, with most species placed in the genus Turnix and a single species in the genus Ortyxelos. They inhabit warm, tropical grasslands of Asia, Africa, Europe, Australia and New Guinea.

Buttonquails are small running birds that avoid flying. Unusually among bird species, the female is the more richly colored of the sexes. While the quail-plover is thought to be monogamous, Turnix buttonquails are sequentially polyandrous; both sexes cooperate in building a nest in the earth, but normally only the male incubates the eggs and tends the young, while the female may go on to mate with other males.

== Taxonomy ==
The genus Turnix was introduced in 1791 by French naturalist in Pierre Bonnaterre. The genus name is an abbreviation of the genus Coturnix. The type species was subsequently designated as the common buttonquail.

The buttonquail family, Turnicidae, was introduced in 1840 by the English zoologist George Robert Gray. The buttonquails were traditionally placed in Gruiformes or Galliformes (the crane and pheasant orders). The Sibley-Ahlquist taxonomy elevated them to ordinal status as the Turniciformes and basal to other Neoaves either because their accelerated rate of molecular evolution exceeded the limits of sensitivity of DNA–DNA hybridization or because the authors did not perform the appropriate pairwise comparisons or both. Morphological, DNA–DNA hybridization and sequence data indicate that turnicids correctly belong to the shorebirds (Charadriiformes). They seem to be an ancient group among these, as indicated by the buttonquail-like Early Oligocene fossil Turnipax and the collected molecular data.

== Description ==
The buttonquails are a group of small terrestrial birds. The smallest species is the quail-plover, the only species in the genus Ortyxelos, which is 10 cm (3.9 in) in length and weighs only 20 g (0.71 oz). The buttonquails in the genus Turnix range from 12 to 23 cm (4.7–9.1 in) in length and weigh between 30 and 130 g (1.1–4.6 oz). They superficially resemble the true quails of the genus Coturnix, but differ from them in lacking a hind toe and a crop. The females of this family also possess a unique vocal organ created by an enlarged trachea and inflatable bulb in the esophagus, which they use to produce a booming call.

== Breeding ==
Buttonquails are unusual in that females are serially polyandrous. The nest is a scape on the ground often near overhanging vegetation. The female lays a clutch of 4 or 5 eggs and then looks for a new mate. The male incubates the eggs which hatch synchronously after 12 to 15 days. The precocial chicks leave the nest soon after hatching and are cared for by the male. They can fly at two weeks of age and become independent at four weeks. For the smaller species sexual maturity is reached at three months.

== Species ==
Family: Turnicidae

- Genus: Ortyxelos
  - Quail-plover, Ortyxelos meiffrenii
- Genus: Turnix
  - Common buttonquail, Turnix sylvaticus
    - Tawitawi common buttonquail, Turnix sylvaticus suluensis (extinct: mid-20th century)
    - Andalusian common buttonquail, Turnix sylvaticus sylvaticus (possibly extinct: late 20th century?)
  - Red-backed buttonquail, Turnix maculosus
  - Fynbos buttonquail, Turnix hottentottus
  - Black-rumped buttonquail, Turnix nanus
  - Yellow-legged buttonquail, Turnix tanki
  - Spotted buttonquail, Turnix ocellatus
  - Barred buttonquail, Turnix suscitator
  - Madagascar buttonquail, Turnix nigricollis
  - Black-breasted buttonquail, Turnix melanogaster
  - Chestnut-backed buttonquail, Turnix castanotus
  - Buff-breasted buttonquail, Turnix olivii
  - Painted buttonquail, Turnix varius
    - Abrolhos painted buttonquail, Turnix varius scintillans
  - New Caledonian buttonquail, Turnix novaecaledoniae (possibly extinct: early 20th century)
  - Worcester's buttonquail, Turnix worcesteri
  - Sumba buttonquail, Turnix everetti
  - Red-chested buttonquail, Turnix pyrrhothorax
  - Little buttonquail, Turnix velox

== Gallery ==
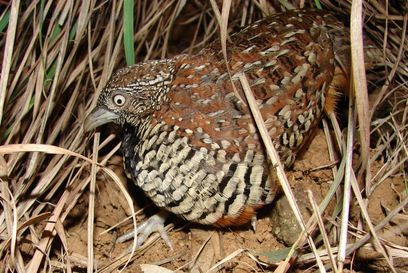
Barred buttonquail (Turnix suscitator)

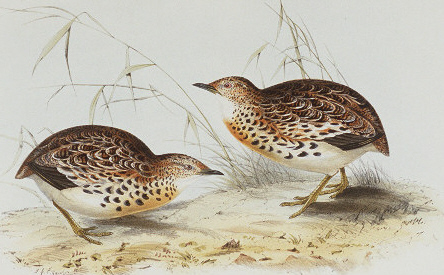
Small buttonquail (Turnix sylvatica)

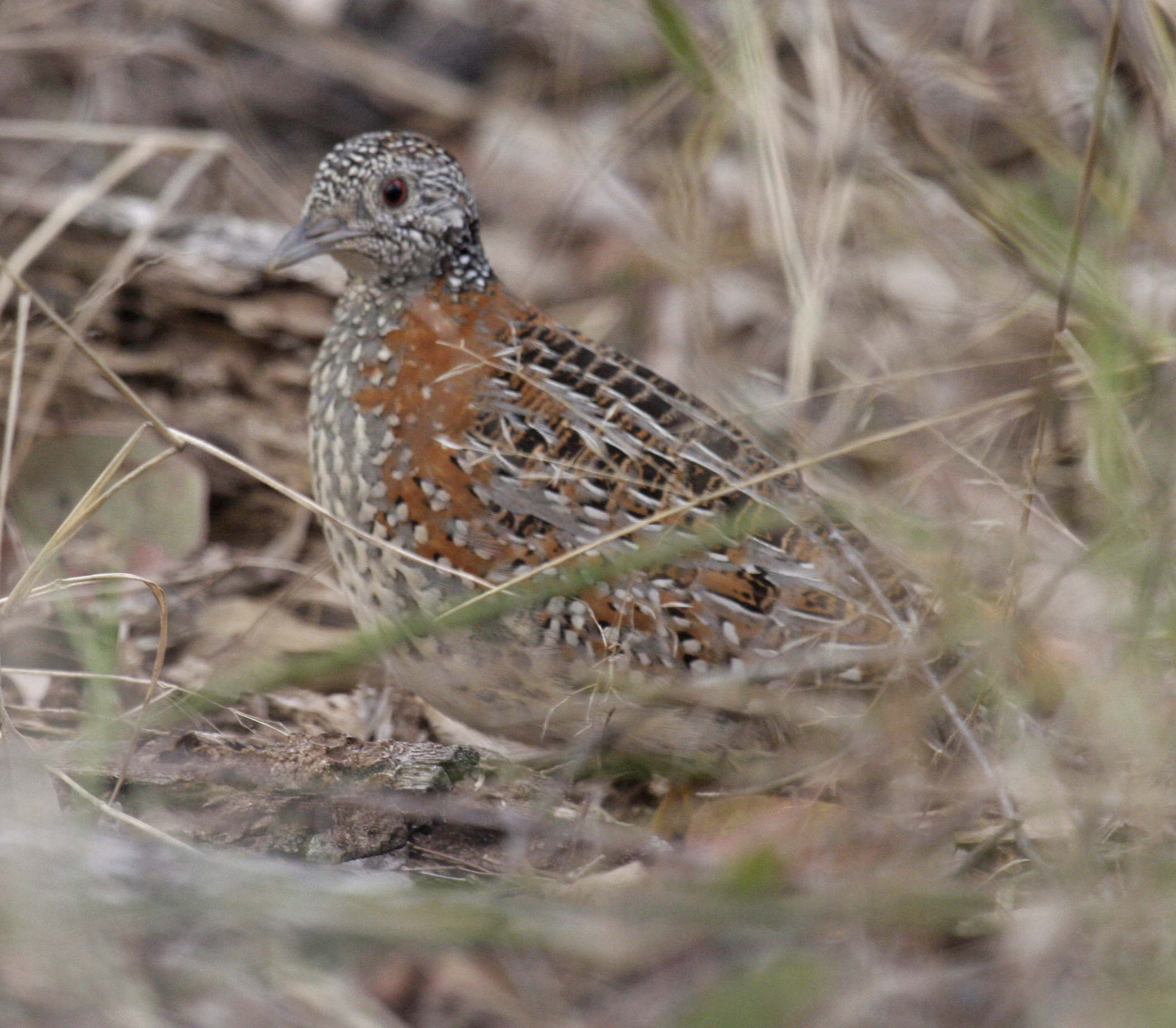
Painted buttonquail (Turnix varia)

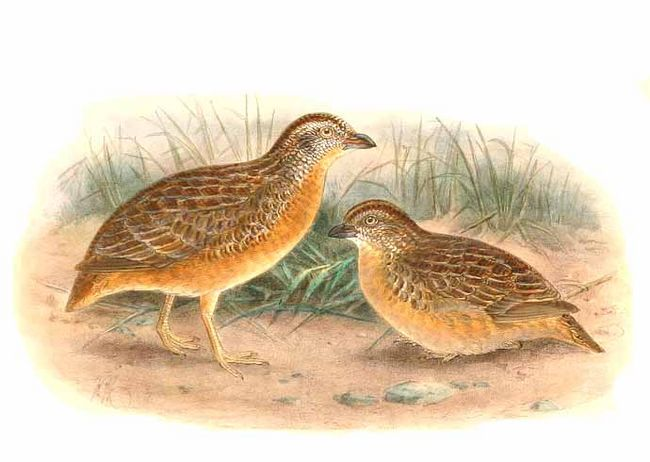
Red-chested buttonquail (Turnix pyrrhothorax)
