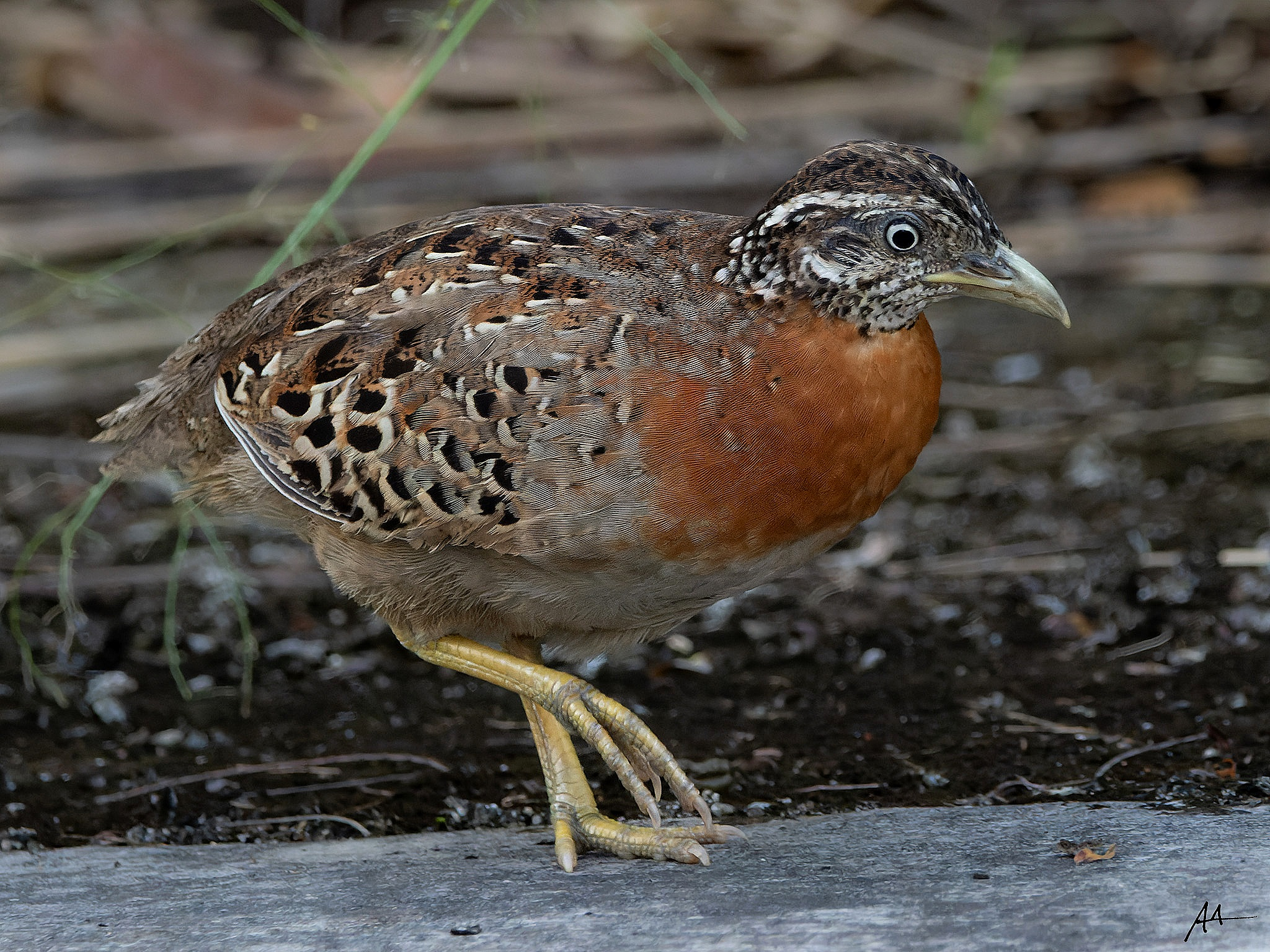

Conservation status
- Least Concern (IUCN 3.1)

Scientific classification
- Kingdom: Animalia
- Phylum: Chordata
- Class: Aves
- Order: Charadriiformes
- Family: Turnicidae
- Genus: Turnix
- Species: T. ocellatus

Binomial name
- Turnix ocellatus (Scopoli, 1786)

Synonyms
- Turnix ocellata

= Spotted buttonquail =

Species of bird

The spotted buttonquail (Turnix ocellatus) is a species of bird in the family Turnicidae. It is endemic to Philippines on the island of Luzon.

== Description ==
They exhibit sexual dimorphism in which males whiter heads with females having darker heads.

== Ecology and behavior ==
Not much is known about its diet and breeding habits. It is presumed to feed on grass, seeds, young plant shoots and invertebrates. It has been recorded breeding in February to August. Females are polyandrous and mate with multiple males. Nest is a hole on the ground lined with leaves and sticks. Lays 2 to 4 white eggs with gray or purple speckles.

== Habitat and conservation status ==
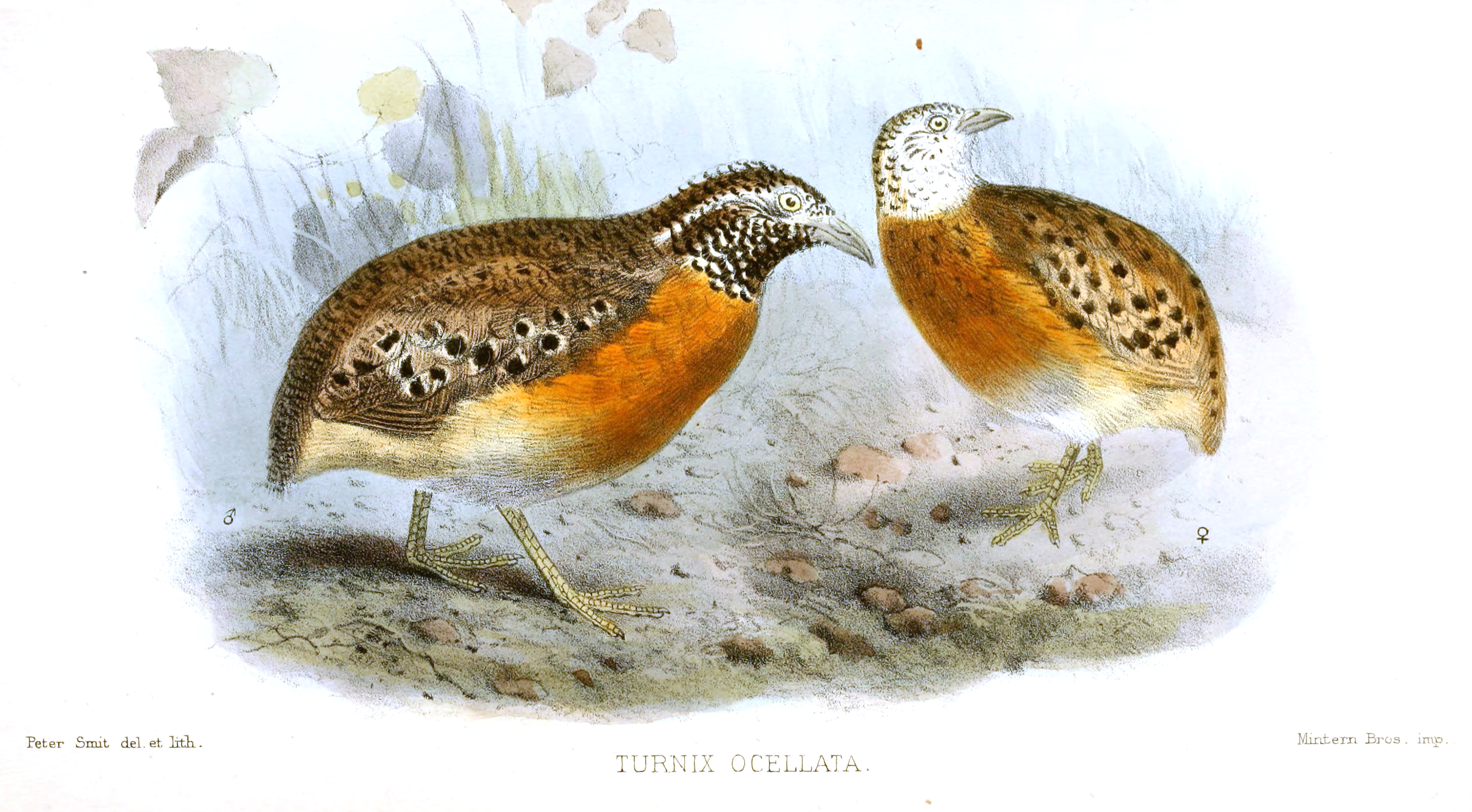
A litograph by Joseph Smit

Its habitat is poorly known, but it is found in many habitat types such as brushy grassland, dry forest with bamboo, rice fields and gardens up to 2,200 meters (7,200 ft) above sea level.

IUCN has assessed this species as Least-concern but the population may still be effected by urbanization and hunting.
