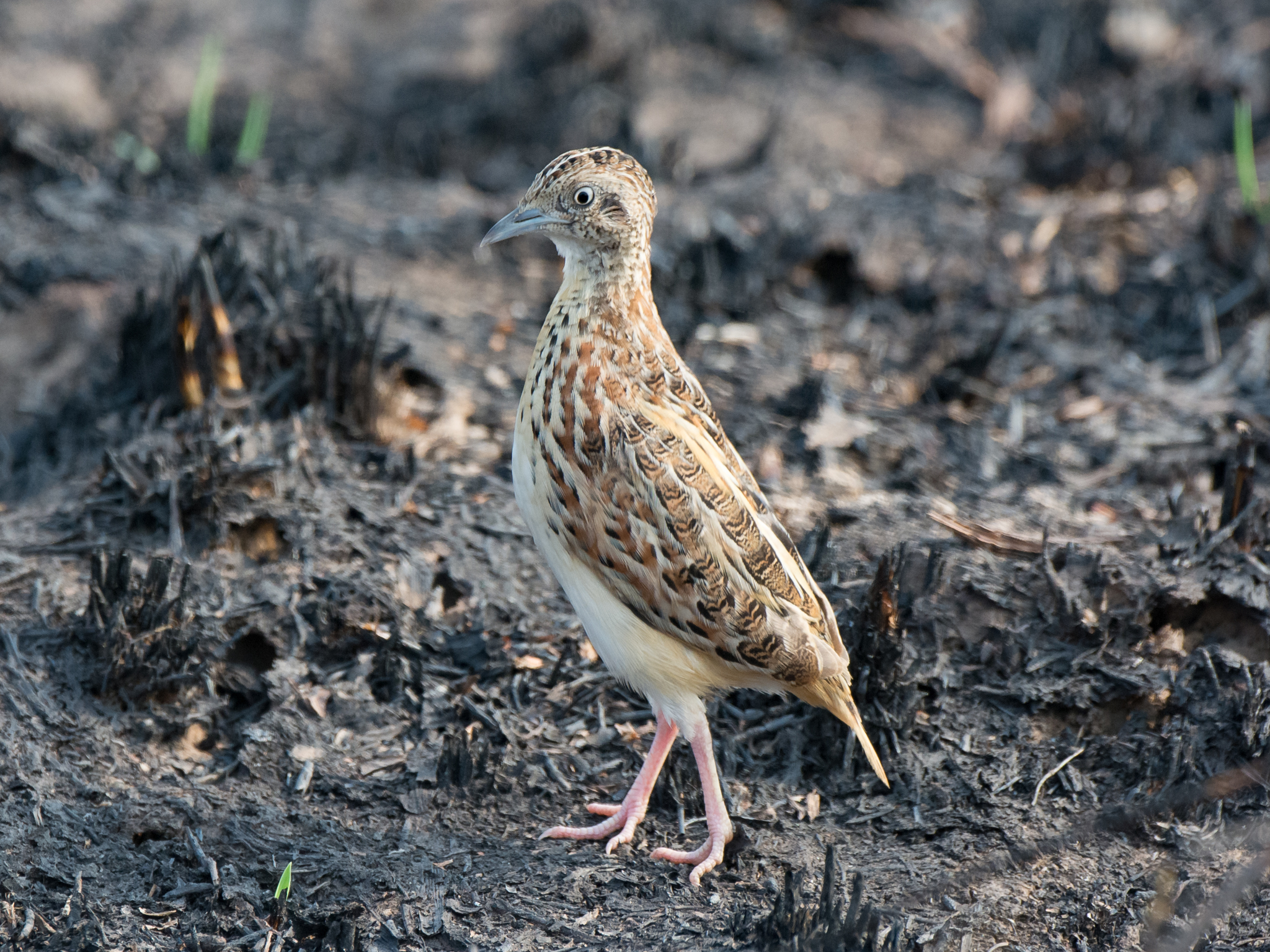

Conservation status
- Least Concern (IUCN 3.1) (Global)

- Extinct (IUCN 3.1)(Europe)

Scientific classification
- Kingdom: Animalia
- Phylum: Chordata
- Class: Aves
- Order: Charadriiformes
- Family: Turnicidae
- Genus: Turnix
- Species: T. sylvaticus

Binomial name
- Turnix sylvaticus (Desfontaines, 1789)

Synonyms
- Turnix sylvatica

= Common buttonquail =

Species of bird

The common buttonquail (Turnix sylvaticus), also called Kurrichane buttonquail and Andalusian hemipode, is a buttonquail, one of a small family of birds that resemble but are not closely related to the true quails.

== Taxonomy ==
The common buttonquail was formally described and illustrated in 1789 by the French botanist René Louiche Desfontaines under the binomial name Tetrao sylvaticus. The specific epithet sylvaticus is Latin meaning "of the woods". It is now placed in the genus Turnix that was named in 1840 by Pierre Joseph Bonnaterre.

Nine subspecies are recognised:

- T. s. sylvaticus (Desfontaines, 1789) – the southern Iberian Peninsula and northwestern Africa
- T. s. lepurana (Smith, A, 1836) – Africa south of the Sahara
- T. s. dussumier (Temminck, 1828) – eastern Iran to Myanmar
- T. s. davidi Delacour & Jabouille, 1930 – central Thailand to southern China, northern Indochina and Taiwan
- T. s. bartelsorum Neumann, 1929 – Java and Bali, Indonesia
- T. s. whiteheadi Ogilvie-Grant, 1897 – Luzon, the northern Philippines
- T. s. celestinoi McGregor, 1907 – Bohol and Mindanao, the southern Philippines
- T. s. nigrorum duPont, 1976 – Negros island
- †T. s. suluensis Mearns, 1905 – the Sulu Archipelago

== Description ==
The common buttonquail resembles the common quail. It has streaked sandy brown upperparts, buff underparts with black flank markings, and a plain face. In flight, a whitish wingbar contrasts with the grey wing. Sexes are similar, but immature birds are more spotted below. This tiny buttonquail is notoriously difficult to see. It is a small, 15 cm (5.9 in) long drab running bird, which avoids flying.

== Distribution and habitat ==
This species is resident from southern Spain and Africa through India and tropical Asia to Indonesia. It inhabits warm grasslands or scrub jungle and feeds on insects and seeds. This species avoids thick forest and hilly country, and lives by preference in cornfields and stretches of grassy plain though it may also be found in any type of low herbage and open scrub jungle.

== Behaviour ==
It skulks and is flushed with difficulty, rising often close by one's feet. When flushed it flies low over the ground and soon settles again, after which it is very difficult to put up a second time. The female calls with a deep hoom-hoom-hoom and the male replies kek-kek-kek.

=== Breeding ===
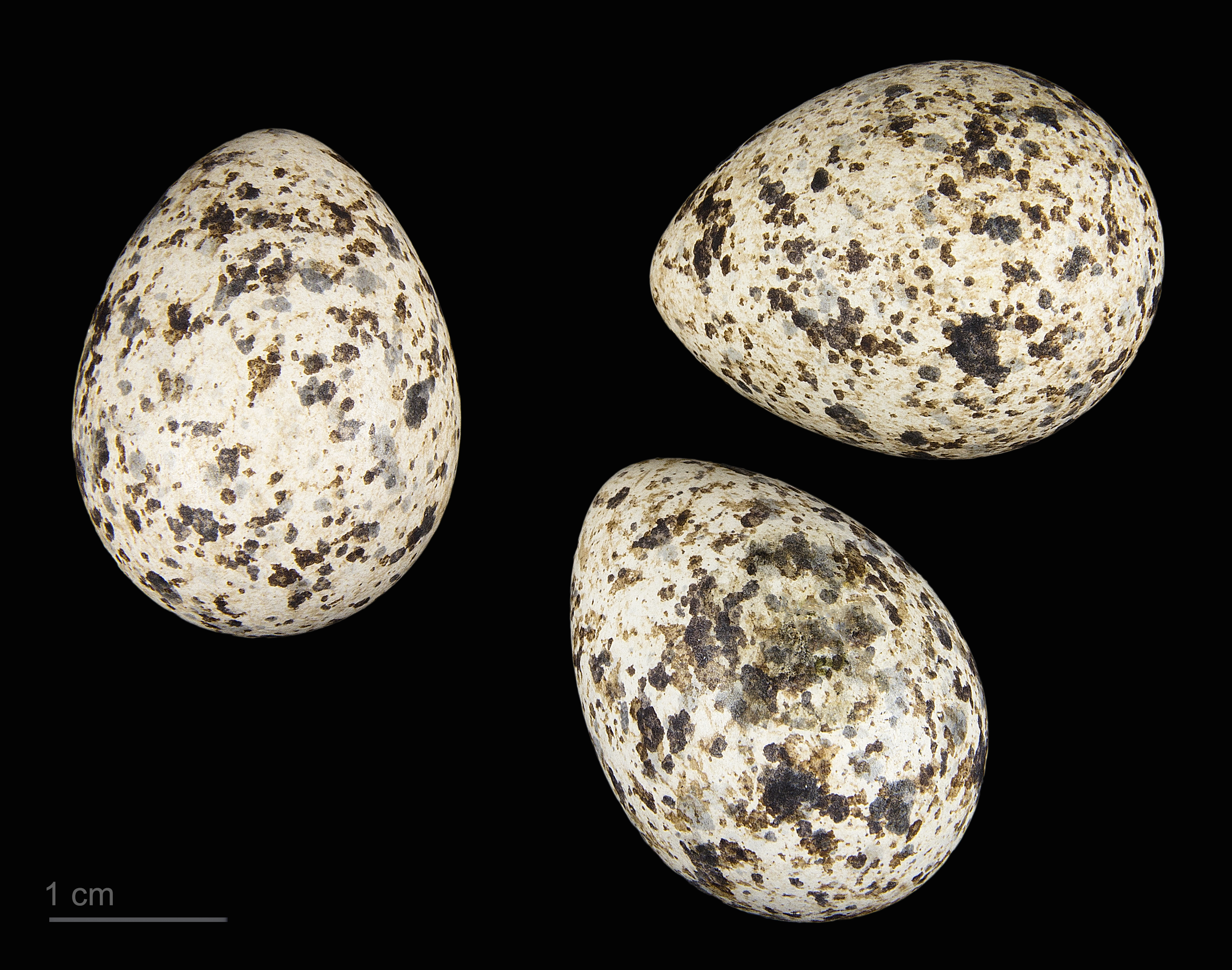
Turnix sylvaticus - MHNT

The female initiates courtship and builds the ground nest. The male incubates the normally four speckled greyish eggs, and tends the young, which can run as soon as they are hatched. The nesting season is June to September. The nest is a slight pad of grass placed in a natural hollow in the ground where it is usually tucked away amongst the stems of a tuft of grass. Very occasionally the grass is bent over it in a sort of canopy.

== Conservation ==
Widespread throughout its large range, the common buttonquail is evaluated as least concern on the IUCN Red List of Threatened Species. However, the nominate subspecies, which is distributed in the Mediterranean region, is critically endangered. It disappeared from most of its range during the 20th century and is currently only present in Morocco after Spain officially declared the extinction of the species in 2018. In 2021, the IUCN also declared the common buttonquail extinct in Europe. This makes it the first bird species to have become extinct in Europe since the great auk in 1852. In 2026, 18 birds from the Moroccan population were reintroduced to Southern Spain.
