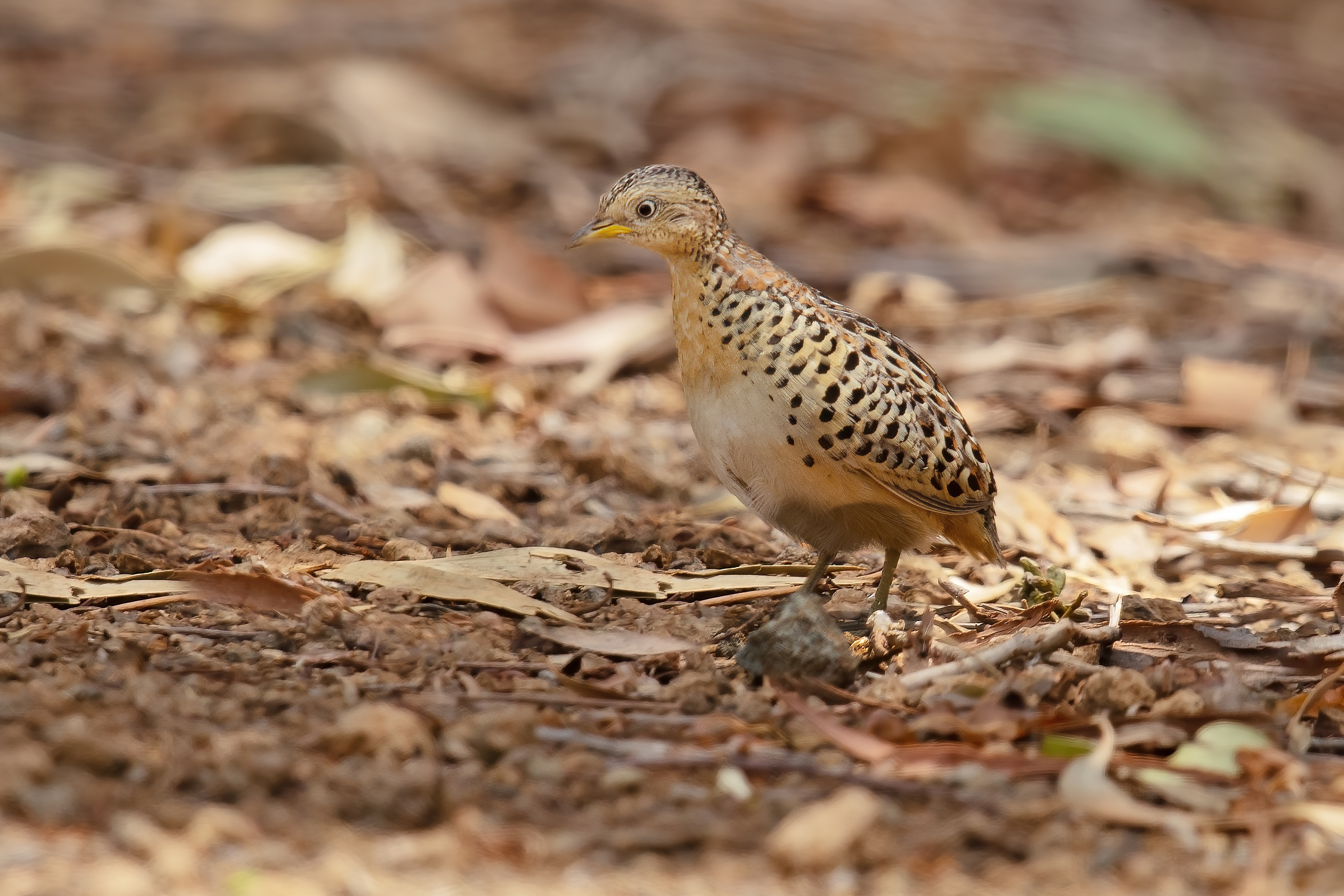

Conservation status
- Least Concern (IUCN 3.1)

Scientific classification
- Kingdom: Animalia
- Phylum: Chordata
- Class: Aves
- Order: Charadriiformes
- Family: Turnicidae
- Genus: Turnix
- Species: T. maculosus

Binomial name
- Turnix maculosus (Temminck, 1815)

Synonyms
- Hemipodius maculosus Temminck, 1815; Turnix maculosa

= Red-backed buttonquail =

Species of bird

The red-backed buttonquail (Turnix maculosus) is a species of bird in the family Turnicidae. It is found in Australia, Indonesia, Papua New Guinea, the Philippines and the Solomon Islands. Other names by which it is known in different parts of its range include black-backed, black-spotted and orange-breasted buttonquail. There are fourteen recognised subspecies.

== Description ==
The red-backed buttonquail is a small stocky bird with round-tipped wings and a short tail. The length varies between 12 and 16 cm (4.7 and 6.3 in). The female is larger than the male and weighs between 32 and 51 g (1.1 and 1.8 oz) to the male's 23 to 39 g (0.8 to 1.4 oz). The subspecies T. m. melanotus, found in northern Australia, has a pale yellow beak, yellowish irises and yellowish legs and feet. The front and top of the head are blackish scalloped with grey, and the side of the head, the neck and throat are brownish-buff, with a reddish-brown partial collar. The upper parts are slate grey, narrowly barred with reddish-brown and black. The under-wing plumage is pale grey. The lower throat is whitish, darkening to buff on the breast and belly, the sides being boldly marked with spots and scallops. The sexes are similar in appearance, but the female is more vividly coloured with a brighter yellow beak and more distinctive chestnut collar. Juveniles have a much darker colouring. Other subspecies vary slightly from this colouring.

== Distribution ==
This buttonquail is native to southeastern Asia and Oceania. Its range extends from Indonesia, Papua New Guinea, the Philippines, the Solomon Islands and East Timor to Australia. In Australia it ranges in a coastal strip from northeastern Western Australia to Cape York and southward to northeastern New South Wales. It mostly inhabits rough, tussocky grassland, woods and cropped land. It is mostly a lowland bird but the subspecies T. m. giluwensis can be found at up over 2,000 m (6,600 ft) in east-central New Guinea. In Australia it is usually found near water and only occurs in areas with at least 400 mm (16 in) of rain in summer, and is only resident in areas with at least 800 mm (31 in) of precipitation.

== Ecology ==
The red-backed buttonquail is mostly active at dusk and at night. It is a ground-dwelling species and moves around alone or in pairs, or in small groups of up to five birds. When disturbed it may "freeze" or run, but seldom takes to the wing, and when it does so, it does not usually travel far. Nevertheless, some populations are believed to be partially migrant, probably travelling at night; the birds' movements are poorly documented. It feeds on the seeds of grasses and sedges, other seeds, green plant matter and insects, probably consuming more insect prey than other members of the genus.

Breeding takes place at some time between October and June. The nest is built in the base of a grass tussock, usually among tall grasses in a wet area. It is a scoop lined with grass, leaves and bits of dung, and often roofed with nearby grasses woven together. After the female has laid a clutch of two to four whitish eggs with dark speckles, the male takes over the incubation and is exclusively involved in the care of the young; the female is serially polyandrous, seeking out another male and repeating this breeding process.

== Status ==
T. maculosus has a very wide range and, apart from southeastern Australia where it is said to be uncommon, it is a common species. The total number of birds is thought to be decreasing because suitable habitat for the bird is being degraded, but the population is not declining at a sufficiently fast rate to put the bird at risk, and the International Union for Conservation of Nature has assessed its conservation status as "least concern".
