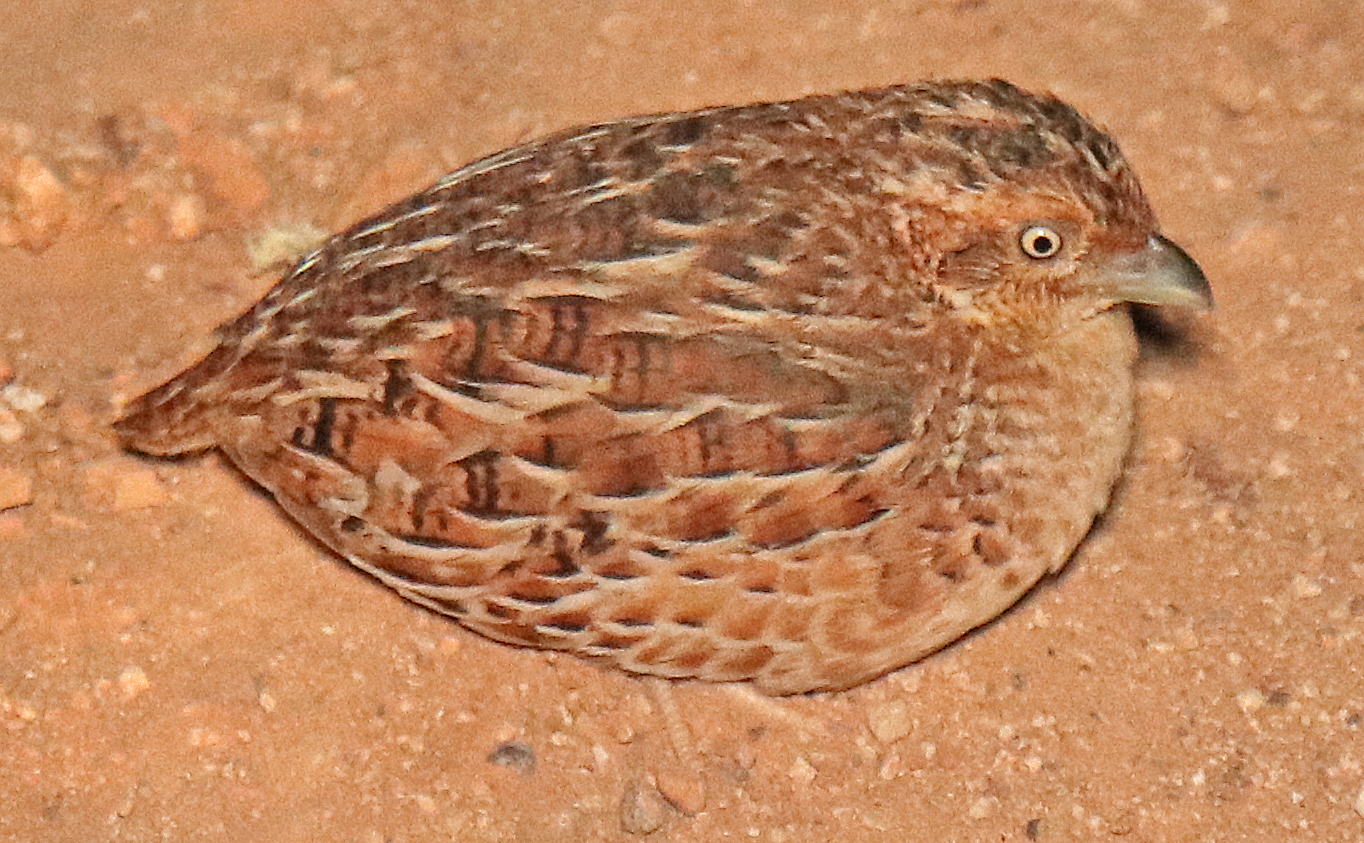

Conservation status
- Least Concern (IUCN 3.1)

Scientific classification
- Kingdom: Animalia
- Phylum: Chordata
- Class: Aves
- Order: Charadriiformes
- Family: Turnicidae
- Genus: Turnix
- Species: T. velox

Binomial name
- Turnix velox (Gould, 1841)
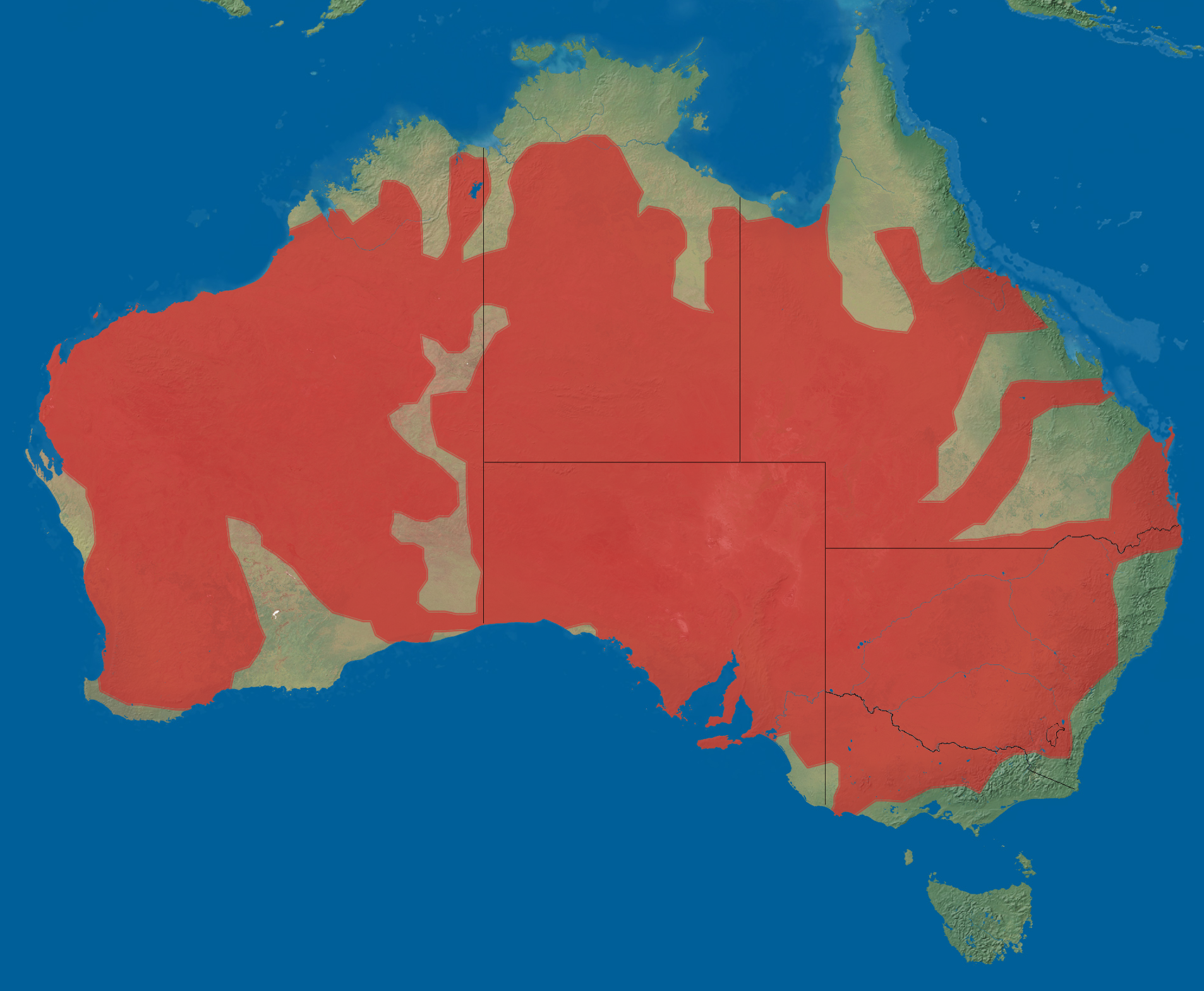
- Distribution of the little buttonquail

= Little buttonquail =

Species of bird

The little buttonquail (Turnix velox) is a species of buttonquail, part of a small family of birds which resemble, but are unrelated to, the true quails. This species is resident in Australia, where it is one of the more common buttonquails.

The species is found in grassland habitats.

The female is an unmarked pale colour below, and straw-brown above with white streaking; the male is similar but less neatly marked. The species has a large pale bill, and pale eye.

== Description ==
The little buttonquail is a small reddish brown bird with thin white stripes on its upper parts with a blue-grey beak, pink legs and feet, and pale eyes. The female is both larger and more brightly coloured than the male. The little buttonquail is easily distinguishable from other small quail. When flying, by its distinctly reddish or pinkish toned upperbody and the contrasting tones between parts of its wings.

While superficially resembling the true quails of the genus Coturnix, the little buttonquail differ by lacking a hind toe and a crop. The females also possess a unique vocal organ created by an enlarged trachea and inflatable bulb in the esophagus. This is used to produce a booming call.

The call patterns of the little buttonquail mainly consists of two key sounds, a loud booming "oo-ah" or "coo-oo" usually sounded at night. When startled, the little buttonquail has a large squeaking call, composed of a few "chip chip-chip" sounds.

== Diet ==
As an omnivore, the little buttonquail will eat seeds, native grasses, insects and small frogs.

== Distribution and habitat ==
Little buttonquail are found over most of arid and semi arid Australia, excluding Tasmania, Western Australia. (Kinberlys), Northern territory (Arnhem land) and Northern Queensland (Cape York peninsula), due to its preferred habitat of grasslands and woodlands of tropical and temperate regions. The little button quail is found extensively throughout south and western Australia and in abundance in much of the Northern Territory. The little button quail seems to be extremely rare in areas of higher altitude or coastal regions and is mainly found in the inland regions of all states. However, only one specimen has ever been found in Tasmania.

== Reproduction and nesting ==
Unusually the female little buttonquail is the brighter coloured of the sexes, and initiates courtship and button quails are polyandrous, with the females circulating amongst the males and aggressively expelling all females from her territory.

The little buttonquail can breed year round and have multiple clutches of eggs, with Spring and Autumn usually the most productive. Breeding prevalence seem to be largely dependent on seasonal suitability with optimum breeding conditions being after consistent heavy rain. The little button quail nests on the ground in sheltered areas such as small shrubs or overhanging grasses. The actual nest is formed by quail nesting pairs scratching to create a little dent before being lined with small sticks or fine grass. Incubation is carried out by the male bird, who also does all the brooding and feeding of the chicks. The eggs are generally an off white colour with dark brown markings and incubation is generally between 12–14 days with chicks becoming independent within 3–4 weeks of hatching. The female is the more brightly coloured of the sexes, and initiates courtship. Unusually, the buttonquails are polyandrous, with the females circulating among several males and expelling rival females from her territory. Both sexes cooperate in building a nest in the earth, but only the male incubates the eggs and tends the young. The eggs hatch after an incubation period of 12 or 13 days, and the young are able to fly within two weeks of hatching.

== Conservation ==
The conservation status of a species indicates whether the group still exists and how likely the group is to become extinct in the near future. Factors are taken into account when assessing conservation status. The number of individuals remaining, the overall increase or decrease in the population over time, breeding success rates, and known threats. Endemic to Australia, the little buttonquail has an extremely large range with populations spread widely across mainland Australia. Therefore, this species is not classified as vulnerable under the conservation status: 'Extent of occurrence criterion', despite the fact that the little buttonquail population in general appears to be decreasing. Such an enormous species population is unable to attain vulnerability status in regards to the population trend or population size criterion. However, there is evidence that the frequency of human interaction within their environment is causing vulnerability within populations.

== Bibliography ==
- http://www.birdsinbackyards.net/species/Turnix-velox
- http://birdcare.com.au/little_button_quail.htm
- http://www.frogwatch.org.au/index.cfm?action=animal.view&pid=751
