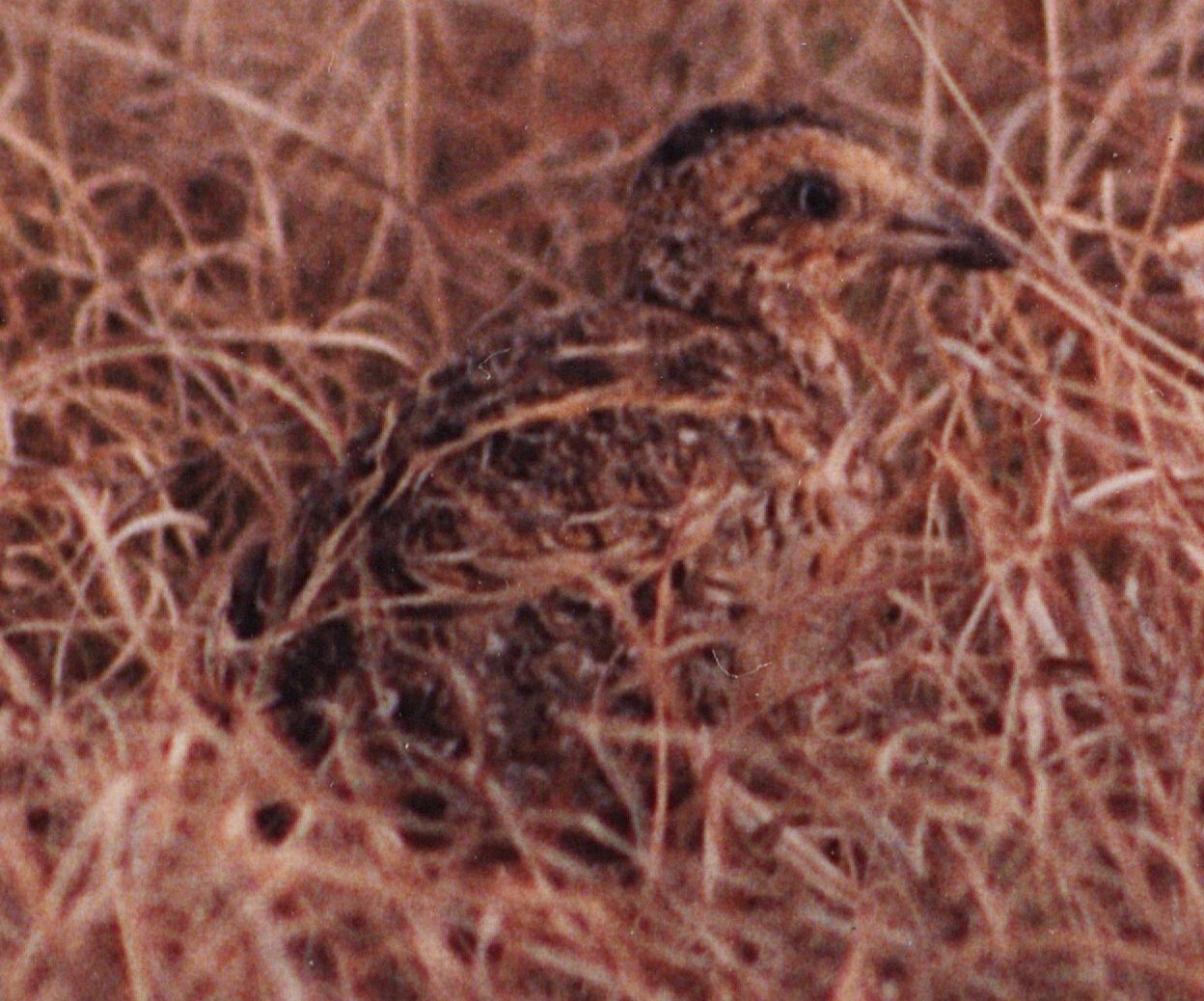

Conservation status
- Least Concern (IUCN 3.1)

Scientific classification
- Kingdom: Animalia
- Phylum: Chordata
- Class: Aves
- Order: Charadriiformes
- Family: Turnicidae
- Genus: Turnix
- Species: T. nanus

Binomial name
- Turnix nanus (Sundevall, 1850)

= Black-rumped buttonquail =

Species of bird

The black-rumped buttonquail (Turnix nanus) is a small species of bird in the buttonquail family.

== Description ==
This species has a brown back, rufous chest, and pale belly, brown irises and a black rump. As usual for buttonquails but not for most birds, the female is larger and brighter than the male. The birds are shy and difficult to flush.

== Distribution and habitat ==
The species is found in open grassland through much of Africa outside the forested and more arid regions. It is resident in the central parts of the range but is a migratory breeder further north towards Lake Chad and the Central African Republic.
