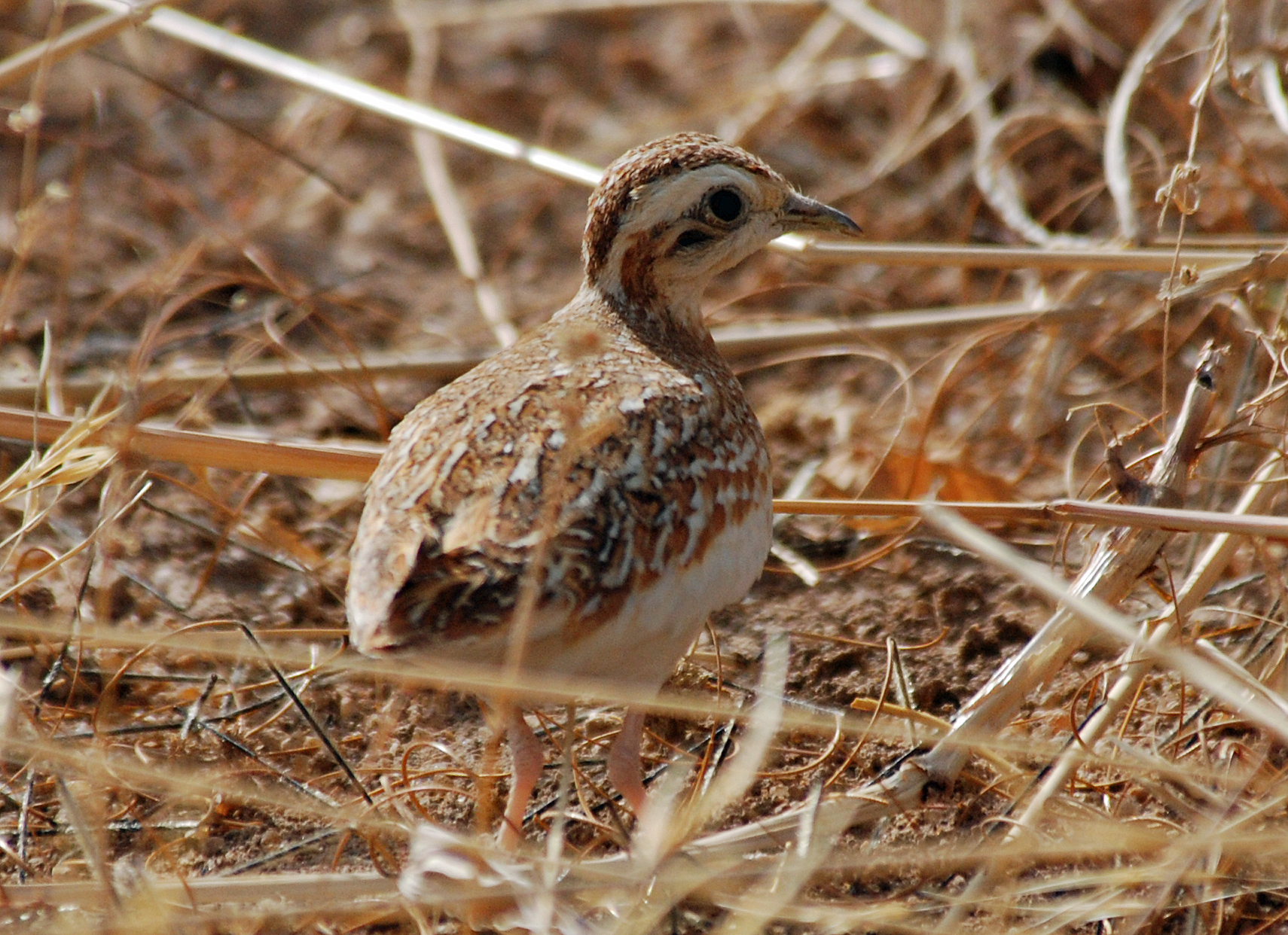

Conservation status
- Least Concern (IUCN 3.1)

Scientific classification
- Kingdom: Animalia
- Phylum: Chordata
- Class: Aves
- Order: Charadriiformes
- Family: Turnicidae
- Genus: Ortyxelos; Vieillot, 1825
- Species: O. meiffrenii

Binomial name
- Ortyxelos meiffrenii (Vieillot, 1819)

= Quail-plover =

Species of bird

The quail-plover, lark buttonquail or lark-plover (Ortyxelos meiffrenii) is a small ground-living bird in the buttonquail family Turnicidae that is found in the Sahel region of Africa and in a disjunct region of East Africa. It is the only species placed in the genus Ortyxelos.

== Description ==
The quail-plover is a small, short-tailed cursorial bird which slightly resembles a miniature courser when on the ground. The upperparts are a sandy-rufous colour and the underparts mainly whitish. They show a distinctive wing pattern in flight when the contrast between the white primary coverts and the black with white-tipped remiges to form a distinct diagonal band on the upperwing. Its fluttering flight style is rather lark-like. The females are slightly darker than the males while the juveniles are paler.

== Distribution and habitat ==
The quail-plover occurs in Sahel from southern Mauritania and northern Senegal eastwards to northern Cameroon and southern Chad into South Sudan and southern Sudan with separate populations in northern Benin and coastal Ghana, with another in Uganda, Kenya and Ethiopia.

== Behaviour ==
The quail-plover is usually found singly or in pairs in dry grassland and thorn scrub. It is rather skulking preferring to move stealthily through grass but also running around like a courser in the open. It tends to crouch down and hide when approached and flushes only when the observer is almost on top of it and then flies off with a jerky undulating flight. It breeds during the dry season and moves north ahead of the rains It tends to be more active at night and to call with a soft low whistle like the wind going through a pipe during moonlit nights.

== Conservation status ==
The quail-plover has an extremely large range, its population trend is not known, the population is not understood to be undergoing a sufficiently rapid decline to approach the thresholds under the population trend criterion while the population size has not been quantified so the species is evaluated as Least Concern.
