= List of vascular plants of Norfolk Island =

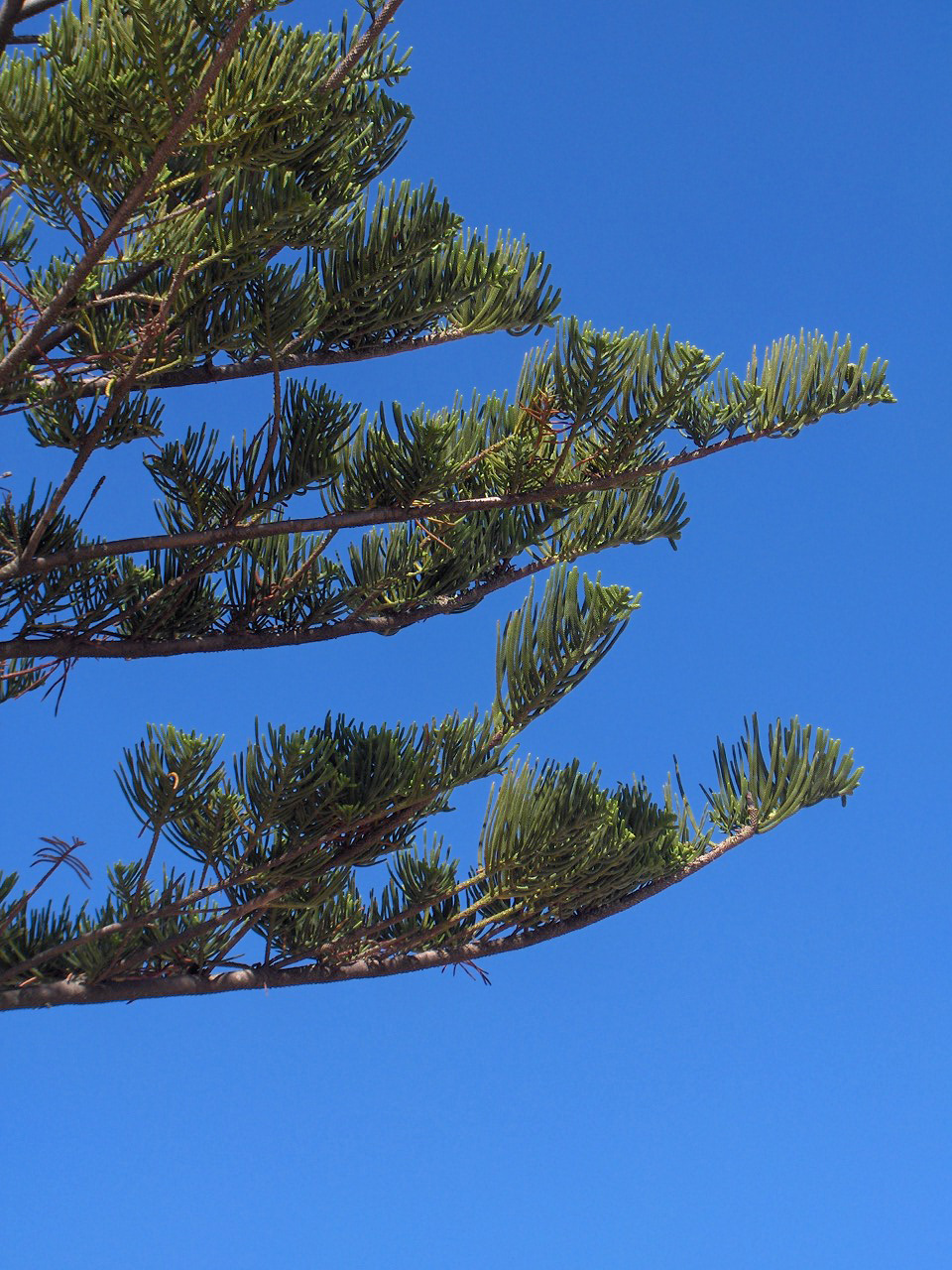
Foliage of Araucaria heterophylla (Norfolk Island pine), a well-known Norfolk Island endemic

This is a list of vascular plants that are indigenous to, or naturalised on, Norfolk Island. The list is based on the most recent authoritative treatment of Norfolk Island, the 1994 Flora of Australia 49. That source is dated in places; for example its classification of the flowering plants uses the Cronquist system, aspects of which are no longer accepted. This list therefore differs from the Flora of Australia treatment in several areas; these are footnoted.

== List of flora of Norfolk Island ==
Norfolk Island has 523 taxa of vascular plants, 136 of which are indigenous, and 387 naturalised. Forty-four of the indigenous taxa are endemic. There are two endemic genera, Ungeria and Streblorrhiza.

=== Eudicotyledons ===
The eudicots are represented on Norfolk Island by 75 families, 220 genera, and 287 species.

Acanthaceae

- Hypoestes phyllostachya
- Ruellia ciliosa (Naturalised)

Aizoaceae

- Carpobrotus glaucescens
- Tetragonia implexicoma
- Tetragonia tetragonioides

Amaranthaceae

- Achyranthes arborescens (Endemic)
- Achyranthes aspera
- Achyranthes margaretarum (Endemic)
- Alternanthera sessilis (Possibly indigenous)
- Amaranthus blitum (Naturalised)
- Amaranthus hybridus (Naturalised)
- Amaranthus viridis (Naturalised)
- Atriplex cinerea
- Atriplex semibaccata (Naturalised)
- Chenopodium album (Naturalised)
- Chenopodium ambrosioides (Naturalised)
- Chenopodium murale (Naturalised)
- Sarcocornia quinqueflora

Anacardiaceae

- Schinus terebinthifolius (Naturalised)

Apiaceae

- Apium graveolens (Naturalised)
- Centella asiatica (Naturalised)
- Ciclospermum leptophyllum (Naturalised)
- Coriandrum sativum (Naturalised)
- Daucus glochidiatus (Naturalised)
- Foeniculum vulgare (Naturalised)
- Petroselinum crispum (Naturalised)
- Torilis nodosa (Naturalised)

Apocynaceae

- Alyxia gynopogon (Endemic)
- Melodinus baueri (Endemic)
- Vinca major (Naturalised)

Araliaceae

- Delarbrea paradoxa (Naturalised)
- Meryta angustifolia (Endemic)
- Meryta latifolia (Endemic)
- Heptapleurum actinophyllum (Naturalised)
- Tetrapanax papyrifer (Naturalised)

Asclepiadaceae

- Gomphocarpus physocarpus (Naturalised)
- Tylophora biglandulosa

Asteraceae

- Ageratina riparia (Naturalised)
- Ageratum conyzoides (Naturalised)
- Arctotheca calendula (Naturalised)
- Argyranthemum frutescens (Naturalised)
- Aster subulatus (Naturalised)
- Bidens pilosa (Naturalised)
- Calendula officinalis (Naturalised)
- Carduus pycnocephalus (Naturalised)
- Carduus tenuiflorus (Naturalised)
- Centaurea melitensis (Naturalised)
- Conyza bonariensis (Naturalised)
- Conyza sumatrensis (Naturalised)
- Cotula australis (Naturalised)
- Crassocephalum crepidioides (Naturalised)
- Erechtites valerianifolia (Naturalised)
- Erigeron karvinskianus (Naturalised)
- Euchiton involucratus (Naturalised)
- Euchiton sphaericus
- Euryops chrysanthemoides (Naturalised)
- Erechtites hieraciifolia (Naturalised)
- Facelis retusa (Naturalised)
- Galinsoga parviflora (Naturalised)
- Gamochaeta calviceps (Naturalised)
- Gamochaeta coarctata (Naturalised)
- Gamochaeta purpurea (Naturalised)
- Hypochaeris glabra (Naturalised)
- Hypochaeris radicata (Naturalised)
- Montanoa hibiscifolia (Naturalised)
- Picris burbidgeae (Naturalised)
- Pseudognaphalium luteoalbum
- Senecio australis
- Senecio evansianus (Endemic)
- Senecio hooglandia (Endemic)
- Sigesbeckia orientalis (Naturalised)
- Silybum marianum (Naturalised)
- Soliva pterosperma (Naturalised)
- Sonchus oleraceus (Naturalised)
- Tagetes minuta (Naturalised)
- Taraxacum officinale (Naturalised)
- Tragopogon porrifolius (Naturalised)
- Wollastonia biflora

Basellaceae

- Anredera cordifolia (Naturalised)

Bignoniaceae

- Tecomaria capensis (Naturalised)

Boraginaceae

- Cynoglossum australe (Naturalised)
- Echium plantagineum (Naturalised)

Brassicaceae

- Brassica juncea (Naturalised)
- Brassica napus (Naturalised)
- Capsella bursa-pastoris (Naturalised)
- Cardamine hirsuta (Naturalised)
- Coronopus didymus (Naturalised)
- Lepidium bonariense (Naturalised)
- Lobularia maritima (Naturalised)
- Matthiola incana (Naturalised)
- Rapistrum rugosum (Naturalised)
- Rorippa nasturtium-aquaticum (Naturalised)
- Sisymbrium officinale (Naturalised)
- Sisymbrium orientale (Naturalised)

Caesalpiniaceae

- Caesalpinia bonduc
- Caesalpinia decapetala (Naturalised)
- Caesalpinia major (Naturalised)
- Chamaecrista rotundifolia (Naturalised)
- Senna septemtrionalis (Naturalised)

Campanulaceae

- Lobelia anceps
- Pratia purpurascens (Naturalised)
- Wahlenbergia gracilis
- Wahlenbergia littoricola subsp. vernicosa
- Wahlenbergia violaceae (Status uncertain, most likely naturalised)

Cannabaceae

- Celtis paniculata

Capparaceae

- Capparis nobilis (Endemic)

Caprifoliaceae

- Lonicera japonica (Naturalised)

Caryophyllaceae

- Cerastium fontanum subsp. vulgare (Naturalised)
- Cerastium glomeratum (Naturalised)
- Paronychia brasiliana (Naturalised)
- Petrorhagia velutina (Naturalised)
- Polycarpon tetraphyllum (Naturalised)
- Sagina apetala (Naturalised)
- Silene gallica (Naturalised)
- Stellaria media (Naturalised)

Casuarinaceae

- Casuarina glauca

Celastraceae

- Elaeodendron curtipendulum

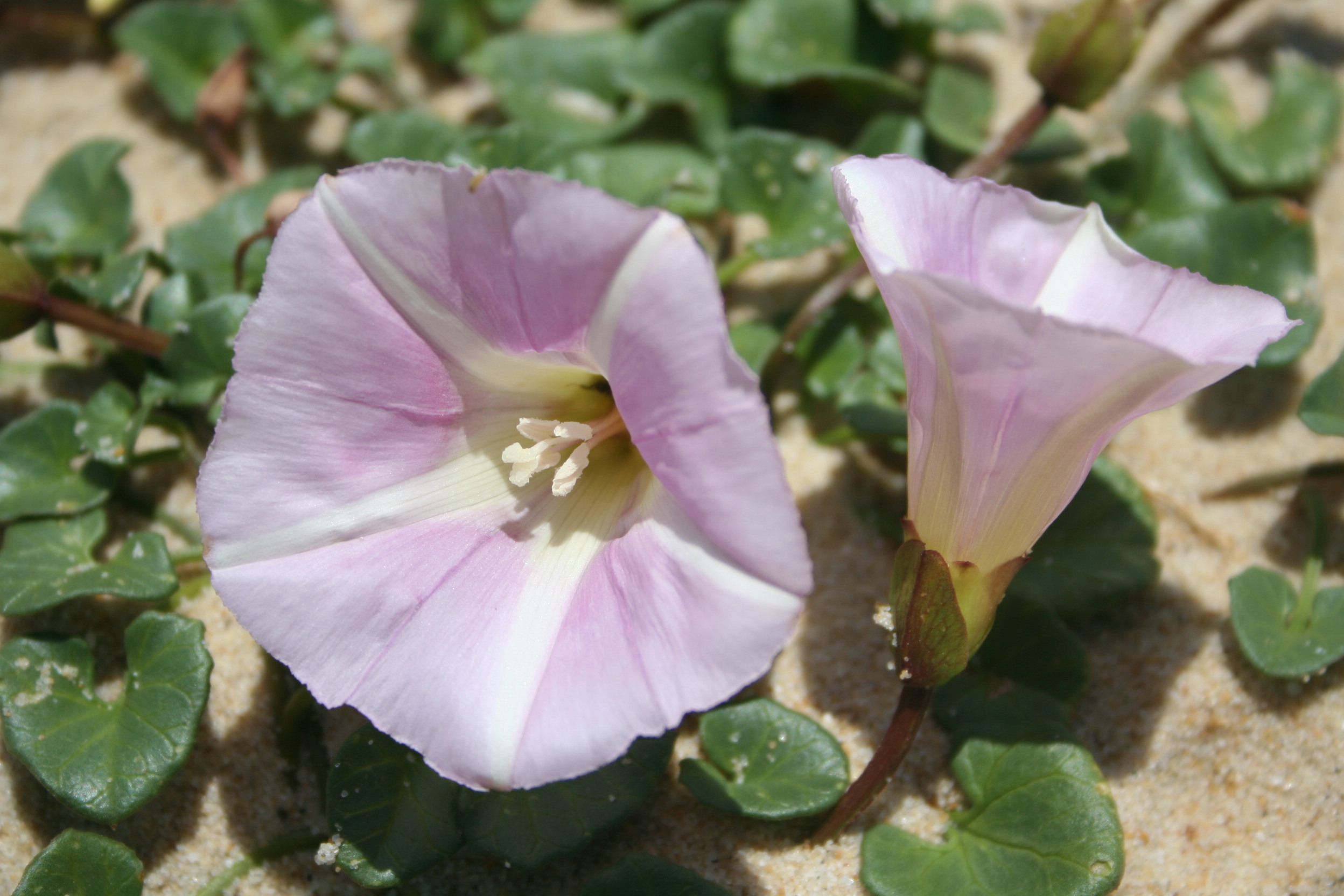
Calystegia soldanella (Beach Morning Glory)

Convolvulaceae

- Calystegia affinis (Endemic)
- Calystegia soldanella
- Dichondria micrantha (Naturalised)
- Dichondra repens
- Ipomoea alba (Naturalised)
- Ipomoea cairica (Naturalised)
- Ipomoea indica (Naturalised)
- Ipomoea pes-caprae subsp. brasiliensis

Corynocarpaceae

- Corynocarpus laevigatus (Naturalised)

Crassulaceae

- Bryophyllum delagoaense (Naturalised)
- Bryophyllum pinnatum (Naturalised)
- Crassula multicava subsp. multicava (Naturalised)

Cucurbitaceae

- Cucumis anguria (Naturalised)
- Diplocyclos palmatus subsp. affinis
- Sicyos australis
- Zehneria baueriana

Euphorbiaceae

- Acalypha wilkesiana (Naturalised)
- Baloghia inophylla
- Breynia disticha (Naturalised)
- Euphorbia cyathophora (Naturalised)
- Euphorbia norfolkiana (Endemic)
- Euphorbia obliqua
- Euphorbia peplus (Naturalised)
- Euphorbia prostrata (Naturalised)
- Excoecaria agallocha
- Homalanthus populifolius (Naturalised)
- Phyllanthus tenellus (Naturalised)
- Ricinus communis (Naturalised)

Fabaceae

- Canacalia rosea
- Castanospermum australe (Naturalised)
- Chamaecytisus palmensis (Naturalised)
- Crotalaria agatiflora (Naturalised)
- Desmodium incanum (Naturalised)
- Desmodium tortuosum (Naturalised)
- Dipogon lignosus (Naturalised)
- Erythrina afra (Naturalised)
- Erythrina speciosa (Naturalised)
- Glycone microphylla (Naturalised)
- Indigofera suffruticosa (Naturalised)
- Lablab purpureus (Naturalised)
- Lotus angustissimus (Naturalised)
- Lupinus cosentinii (Naturalised)
- Medicago lupulina (Naturalised)
- Medicago polymorpha (Naturalised)
- Melilotus indicus (Naturalised)
- Millettia australis
- Neotonia wightii (Naturalised)
- Pueraria lobata (Naturalised)
- Streblorrhiza speciosa (Endemic)
- Teline monspessulana (Naturalised)
- Trifolium campestre (Naturalised)
- Trifolium dubium (Naturalised)
- Trifolium glomeratum (Naturalised)
- Trifolium suffocatum (Naturalised)
- Vicia hirsuta (Naturalised)
- Vicia sativa subsp. nigra (Naturalised)
- Vicia tetrasperma (Naturalised)
- Vigna marina

Frankeniaceae

- Frankenia pulverulenta (Naturalised)

Fumariaceae

- Fumaria muralis (Naturalised)

Gentianaceae

- Centaurium tenuiflorum (Naturalised)

Geraniaceae

- Erodium moschatum (Naturalised)
- Geranium dissectum (Naturalised)
- Geranium gardneri (Naturalised)
- Pelargonium australe (Naturalised)
- Pelargonium panduriforme (Naturalised)

Lamiaceae

- Lavandula dentata (Naturalised)
- Marrubium vulgare (Naturalised)
- Mentha × piperita (Naturalised)
- Mentha spicata (Naturalised)
- Salvia coccinea (Naturalised)
- Salvia verbenaca (Naturalised)
- Stachys arvensis (Naturalised)

Lauraceae

- Cinnamomum camphora (Naturalised)
- Cryptocarya triplinervis (Naturalised)
- Persea americana (Naturalised)

Linaceae

- Linum marginale (Naturalised)
- Linum trigynum (Naturalised)

Loranthaceae

- Ileostylus micranthus

Lythraceae

- Lythrum hyssopifolia (Naturalised)

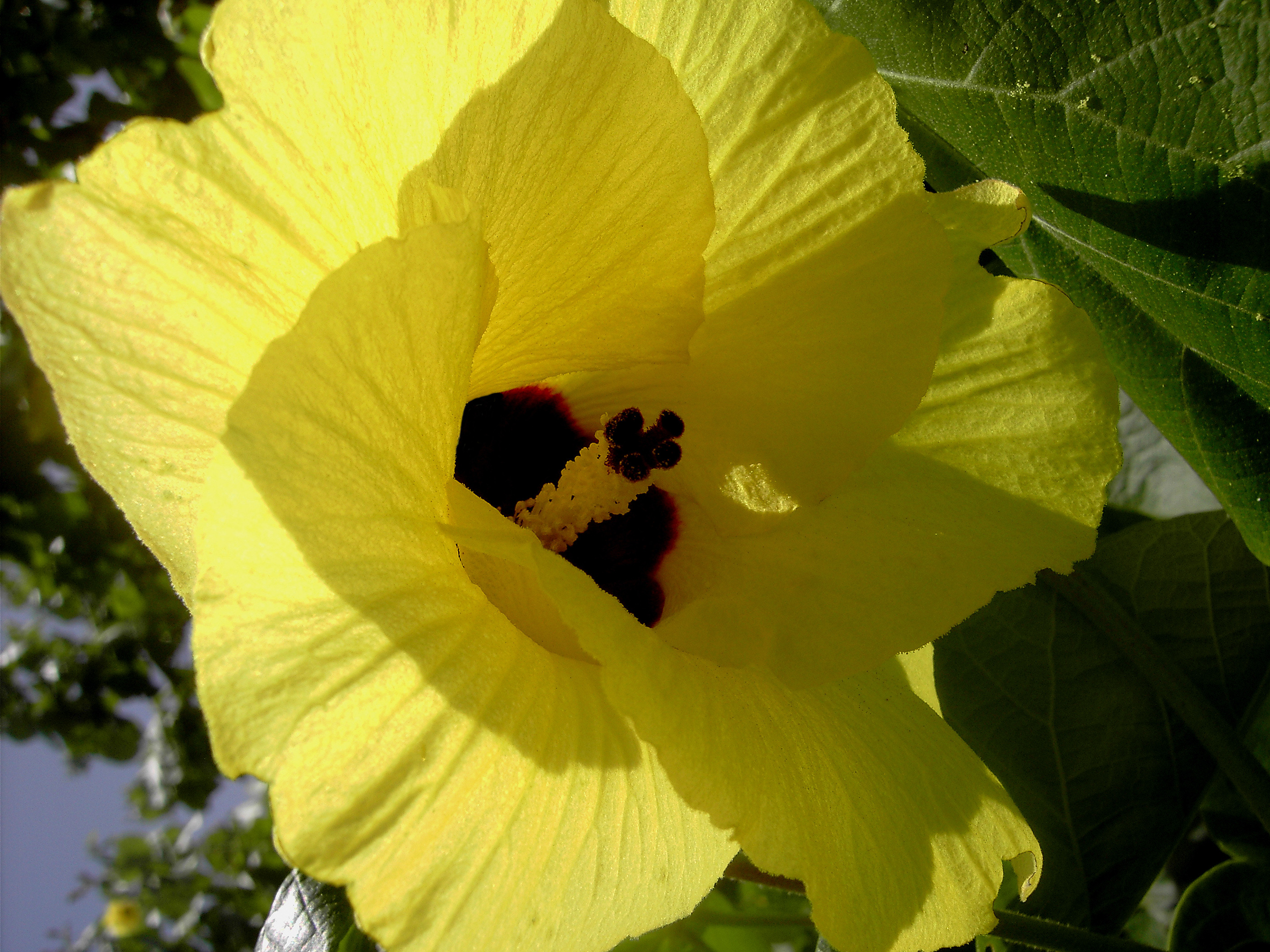
Hibiscus tiliaceus (Beach Hibiscus)

Malvaceae

- Abutilon grandifolium (Naturalised)
- Abutilon julianae (Endemic)
- Hibiscus diversifolius
- Hibiscus insularis (Endemic)
- Hibiscus pedunculatus (Naturalised)
- Hibiscus tiliaceus
- Lagunaria patersonia subsp. patersonia
- Malva parviflora (Naturalised)
- Malvastrum coromandelianum (Naturalised)
- Modiola caroliniana (Naturalised)
- Pavonia hastata (Naturalised)
- Sida carpinifolia (Naturalised)
- Sida rhombifolia (Naturalised)
- Ungeria floribunda (Endemic)

Meliaceae

- Dysoxylum bijugum
- Melia azedarach (Naturalised)

Mimosaceae

- Acacia dealbata (Naturalised)
- Acacia parramattensis (Naturalised)
- Paraserianthes lophantha (Naturalised)

Moraceae

- Ficus carica (Naturalised)
- Streblus pendulinus

Myoporaceae

- Myoporum obscurum (Endemic)

Myrtaceae

- Eucalyptus botryoides (Naturalised)
- Eucalyptus fibrosa (Naturalised)
- Eugenia uniflora (Naturalised)
- Metrosideros excelsa (Naturalised)
- Metrosideros kermadecensis (Naturalised)
- Metrosideros excelsa x kermadecensis (Hybrid of indigenous and naturalised species)
- Psidium cattleianum var. cattleianum (Naturalised)
- Psidium cattleianum var. littorale (Naturalised)
- Psidium guajava (Naturalised)

Nyctaginaceae

- Mirabilis jalapa (Naturalised)
- Pisonia brunoniana

Ochnaceae

- Ochna serrulata (Naturalised)

Oleaceae

- Jasminum simplicifolium subsp. australiense
- Ligustrum lucidum (Naturalised)
- Ligustrum sinense (Naturalised)
- Olea europaea subsp. cuspidata (Naturalised)

Onagraceae

- Oenothera affinis (Naturalised)
- Oenothera rosea (Naturalised)
- Oenothera stricta (Naturalised)
- Oenothera tetraptera (Naturalised)

Orobanchaceae

- Orobanche minor (Naturalised)

Oxalidaceae

- Oxalis chnoodes (Naturalised)
- Oxalis corniculata (Naturalised)
- Oxalis debilis (Naturalised)
- Oxalis exilis
- Oxalis radicosa (Naturalised)

Papaveraceae

- Argemone subfusiformis (Naturalised)
- Papaver somniferum (Naturalised)

Passifloraceae

- Passiflora aurantia
- Passiflora edulis (Naturalised)

Pennantiaceae

- Pennantia endlicheri (Endemic)

Phytolaccaceae

- Phytolacca octandra (Naturalised)
- Rivina humilis (Naturalised)

Piperaceae

- Macropiper excelsum subsp. psittacorum
- Peperomia tetraphylla
- Peperomia urvilleana

Pittosporaceae

- Pittosporum bracteolatum (Endemic)
- Pittosporum crassifolium (Naturalised)
- Pittosporum undulatum (Naturalised)

Plantaginaceae

- Plantago debilis (Naturalised)
- Plantago lanceolata (Naturalised)
- Plantago major (Naturalised)
- Russelia equisetiformis (Naturalised)

Plumbaginaceae

- Plumbago auriculata (Naturalised)
- Plumbago zeylanica

Polygalaceae

- Polygala myrtifolia (Naturalised)

Polygonaceae

- Fallopia convolvulus (Naturalised)
- Muehlenbeckia australis
- Persicaria decipiens
- Rumex brownii (Naturalised)
- Rumex conglomeratus (Naturalised)

Portulacaceae

- Portulaca oleracea (Naturalised)

Primulaceae

- Anagallis arvensis (Naturalised)
- Rapanea ralstoniae (Endemic)
- Samolus repens var. stricta

Proteaceae

- Grevillea robusta (Naturalised)
- Hakea salicifolia (Naturalised)
- Hakea sericea (Naturalised)
- Macadamia tetraphylla (Naturalised)

Ranunculaceae

- Clematis dubia (Endemic)
- Ranunculus muricatus (Naturalised)
- Ranunculus parviflora (Naturalised)
- Ranunculus repens (Naturalised)
- Ranunculus sessiliflorus (Naturalised)

Rosaceae

- Duchesnea indica (Naturalised)
- Eriobotrya japonica (Naturalised)
- Rhaphiolepis umbellata (Naturalised)
- Rubus fruticosus (Naturalised)

Rubiaceae

- Coffea arabica (Naturalised)
- Coprosma baueri (Endemic)
- Coprosma pilosa (Endemic)
- Pentas lanceolata (Naturalised)
- Sherardia arvensis (Naturalised)

Rutaceae

- Citrus jambhiri (Naturalised)
- Melicope littoralis (Endemic)
- Sarcomelicope simplicifolia subsp. simplicifolia
- Zanthoxylum pinnatum

Santalaceae

- Exocarpus phyllanthoides var. phyllanthoides

Sapindaceae

- Dodonaea viscosa subsp. viscosa

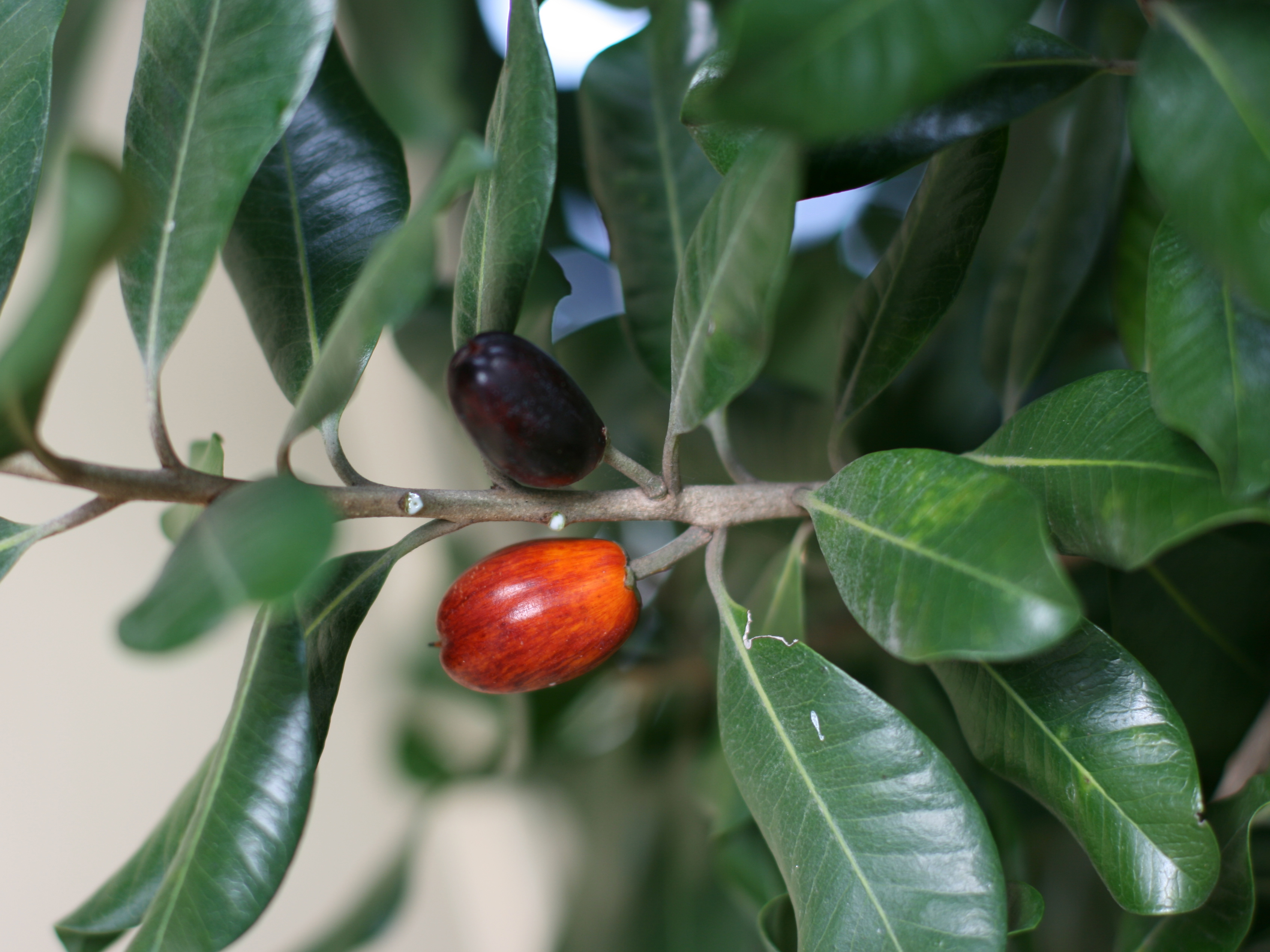
Planchonella costata (Bastard Ironwood)

Sapotaceae

- Planchonella costata

Scrophulariaceae

- Calceolaria tripartita (Naturalised)
- Misopates orontium (Naturalised)
- Verbascum thapsus (Naturalised)
- Verbascum virgatum (Naturalised)
- Veronica arvensis (Naturalised)
- Veronica persica (Naturalised)
- Veronica plebeia (Naturalised)

Solanaceae

- Brugmansia suaveolens (Naturalised)
- Datura stramonium (Naturalised)
- Lycium ferocissimum (Naturalised)
- Lycopersicon esculentum (Naturalised)
- Nicandra physalodes (Naturalised)
- Nicotiana tabacum (Naturalised)
- Petunia × hybrida (Naturalised)
- Physalis peruviana (Naturalised)
- Solandra maxima (Naturalised)
- Solanum americanum subsp. nutans
- Solanum aviculare (Extinct)
- Solanum bauerianum (Endemic)
- Solanum linneanum (Naturalised)
- Solanum mauritianum (Naturalised)

Thymelaeaceae

- Wikstroemia australis

Tiliaceae

- Triumfetta rhomboidea

Urticaceae

- Boehmeria australis subsp. australis (Endemic)
- Boehmeria nivea (Naturalised)
- Elatostema montanum (Endemic)
- Parietaria debilis
- Pilea microphylla (Naturalised)
- Urtica urens (Naturalised)

Verbenaceae

- Duranta erecta (Naturalised)
- Lantana camara (Naturalised)
- Verbena bonariensis (Naturalised)
- Verbena litoralis (Naturalised)

Violaceae

- Melicytus latifolius (Endemic)
- Melicytus remiflorus subsp. oblongifolius (Endemic)
- Viola betonicifolia subsp. nova-guineensis
- Viola tricolor (Naturalised)

Viscaceae

- Korthalsella disticha (Endemic)

=== Monocotyledons ===
The Monocotyledons (monocots) are represented on Norfolk Island by 16 families, 81 genera, and 110 species. Most of them are naturalised, with naturalised grasses account for 5 families, 47 genera and 67 species. Of the 43 indigenous species, 9 are endemic.

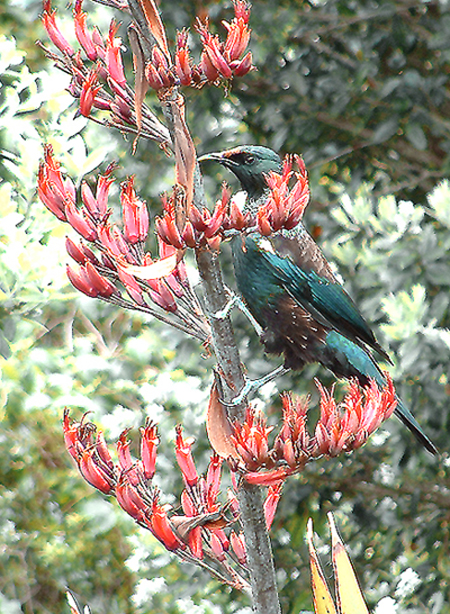
Phormium tenax (New Zealand Flax)

Agavaceae

- Agave americana (Naturalised)
- Cordyline obtecta
- Furcraea foetida (Naturalised)
- Phormium tenax

Alliaceae

- Nothoscordum borbonicum (Naturalised)

Araceae

- Colocasia esculenta (Naturalised)
- Xanthosoma sagittifolium (Naturalised)
- Zantedeschia aethiopica (Naturalised)

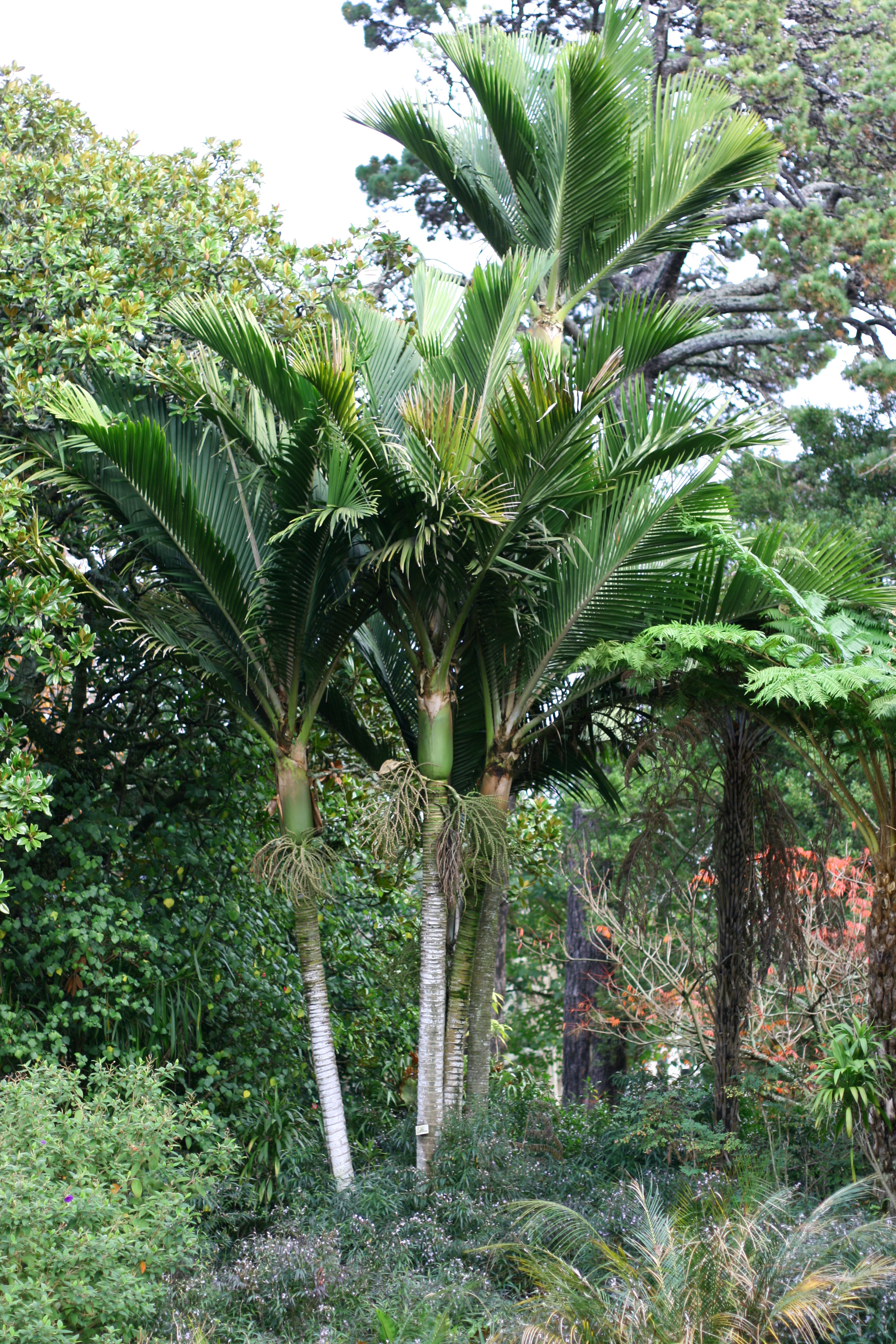
Rhopalostylis baueri

Arecaceae

- Howea forsteriana (Naturalised)
- Phoenix canariensis (Naturalised)
- Rhopalostylis baueri

Asphodelaceae

- Aloe maculata (Naturalised)

Cannaceae

- Canna indica (Naturalised)

Colchicaceae

- Gloriosa superba (Naturalised)

Commelinaceae

- Commelina cyanea
- Tradescantia zebrina (Naturalised)

Cyperaceae

- Bolboschoenus fluviatilis
- Carex breviculmis
- Carex inversa
- Carex neesiana (Endemic)
- Cyperus albostriatus (Naturalised)
- Cyperus gracilis (Naturalised)
- Cyperus involucratus (Naturalised)
- Cyperus lucidus
- Cyperus rotundus (Naturalised)
- Eleocharis acuta
- Isolepis inundata
- Isolepis nodosa
- Isolepis cernua var. setiformis (Endemic)
- Kyllinga brevifolia
- Pycreus polystachyos
- Schoenoplectus validus

Hemerocallidaceae

- Dianella intermedia (Endemic)

Iridaceae

- Anomatheca laxa (Naturalised)
- Ferraria crispa (Naturalised)
- Gladiolus × hortulanus (Naturalised)
- Homeria flaccida (Naturalised)
- Sisyrinchium micranthum (Naturalised)
- Tritonia crocata (Naturalised)
- Tritonia lineata (Naturalised)

Juncaceae

- Juncus articulatus (Naturalised)
- Juncus australis (Naturalised)
- Juncus bufonius (Naturalised)
- Juncus continuus
- Juncus pallidus (Naturalised)
- Juncus usitatus (Naturalised)

Liliaceae

- Alstroemeria pulchella (Naturalised)
- Asparagus aethiopicus (Naturalised)
- Asparagus plumosis (Naturalised)
- Crinum asiaticum var. pedunculatum
- Lilium formosanum (Naturalised)

Limnocharitaceae

- Hydrocleys nymphoides

Orchidaceae

- Bulbophyllum argyropus
- Dendrobium brachypus (Endemic)
- Dendrobium macropus subsp. macropus (Endemic)
- Microtis unifolia
- Oberonia titania
- Phreatia limenophylax (Endemic)
- Phreatia paleata
- Taeniophyllum muelleri
- Thelymitra longifolia (Probably indigenous)
- Tropidia viridifusca

Pandanaceae

- Freycinetia baueriana (Endemic)

Poaceae

- Agrostis avenacea
- Aira cupaniana (Naturalised)
- Ammophila arenaria (Naturalised)
- Anthoxanthum odoratum (Naturalised)
- Arundo donax (Naturalised)
- Avena fatua (Naturalised)
- Avena sativa (Naturalised)
- Axonopus fissifolius (Naturalised)
- Bothriochloa macra (Naturalised)
- Briza maxima (Naturalised)
- Briza minor (Naturalised)
- Bromus arenarius (Naturalised)
- Bromus diandrus (Naturalised)
- Bromus hordeaceus (Naturalised)
- Bromus scoparius (Naturalised)
- Bromus willdenowii (Naturalised)
- Catapodium rigidum (Naturalised)
- Cenchrus caliculatus (Possibly extinct)
- Chloris gayana (Naturalised)
- Cortaderia selloana (Naturalised)
- Cymbopogon refractus
- Cynodon dactylon (Naturalised)
- Dactylis glomerata (Naturalised)
- Dichelachne crinita
- Dichelachne micrantha
- Digitaria ciliaris (Naturalised)
- Digitaria setigera
- Echinochloa crusgalli (Naturalised)
- Echinopogon ovatus
- Ehrharta erecta (Naturalised)
- Eleusine indica (Naturalised)
- Elymus multiflorus subsp. kingianus
- Elymus scaber
- Eragrostis brownii (Naturalised)
- Hordeum murinum (Naturalised)
- Lepturus repens (Possibly indigenous)
- Lolium perenne (Naturalised)
- Lolium rigidum var. rigidum (Naturalised)
- Lolium rigidum var. rottboellioides (Naturalised)
- Melinis minutiflora (Naturalised)
- Microlaena stipoides
- Oplismenus hirtellus subsp. hirtellus
- Oplismenus hirtellus subsp. imbecillus
- Panicum effusum
- Panicum maximum (Naturalised)
- Paspalum dilatatum (Naturalised)
- Paspalum orbiculare
- Paspalum scrobiculatum
- Pennisetum clandestinum (Naturalised)
- Pennisetum purpureum (Naturalised)
- Phalaris minor (Naturalised)
- Poa annua (Naturalised)
- Poa pratensis (Naturalised)
- Rhynchelytrum repens (Naturalised)
- Rostraria cristata (Naturalised)
- Setaria palmifolia (Naturalised)
- Setaria pumila subsp. pallidefusca (Naturalised)
- Setaria verticillata (Naturalised)
- Sorghum arundinaceum (Naturalised)
- Spinifex sericeus (Naturalised)
- Sporobolus africanus (Naturalised)
- Sporobolus virginicus
- Stenotaphrum secundatum (Naturalised)
- Trisetum arduanum (Naturalised)
- Vulpia bromoides (Naturalised)
- Vulpia myuros f. megalura (Naturalised)

Pontederiaceae

- Eichhornia crassipes (Naturalised)

Smilacaceae

- Geitonoplesium cymosum

Typhaceae

- Typha orientalis

=== Pinophyta ===
Two species of Pinophyta (conifers) occur on Norfolk Island: the popular endemic Araucaria heterophylla (Norfolk Island pine), and the naturalised Cupressus lusitanica.

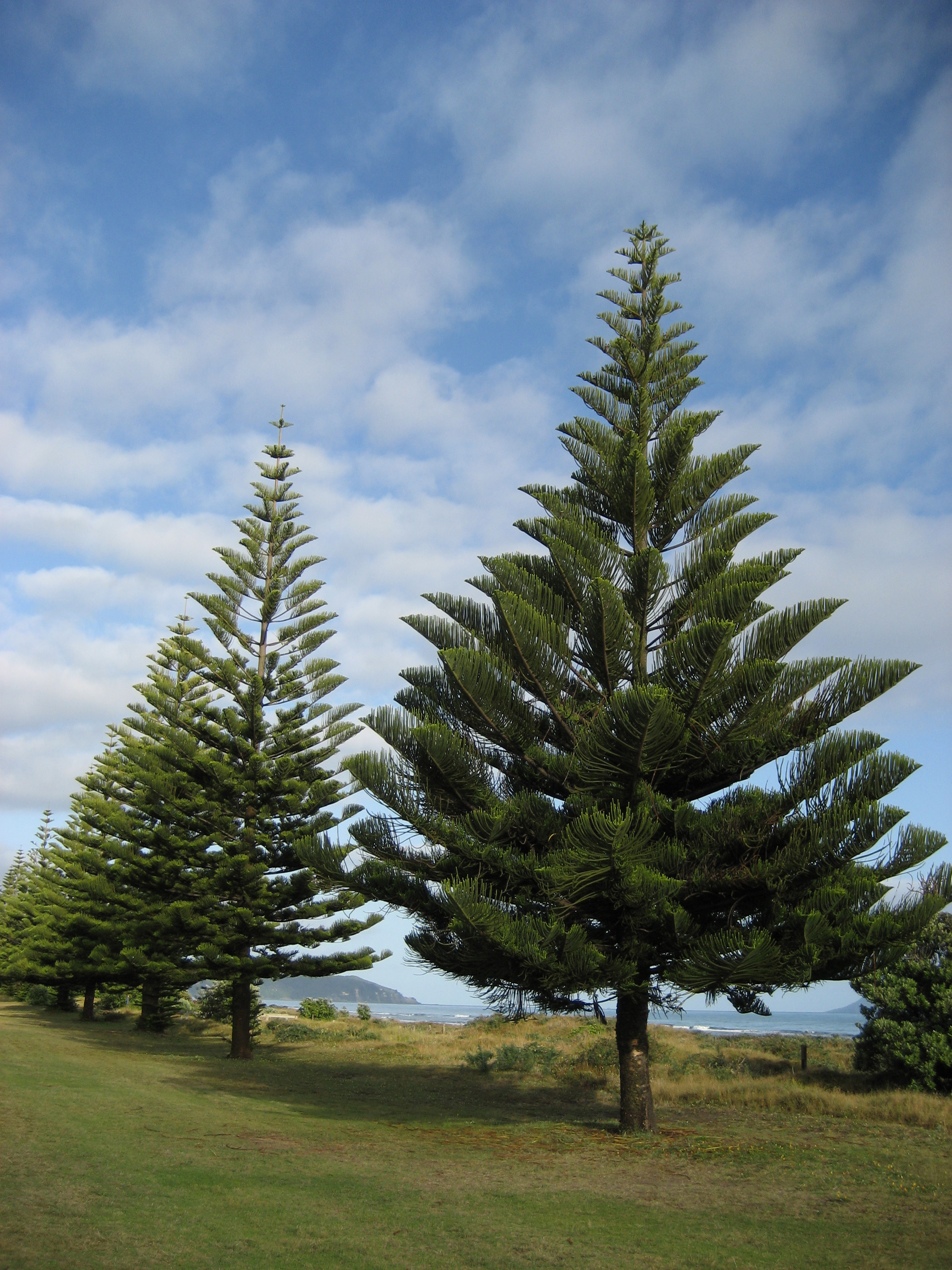
Araucaria heterophylla (Norfolk Island pine)

Araucariaceae

- Araucaria heterophylla (Endemic)

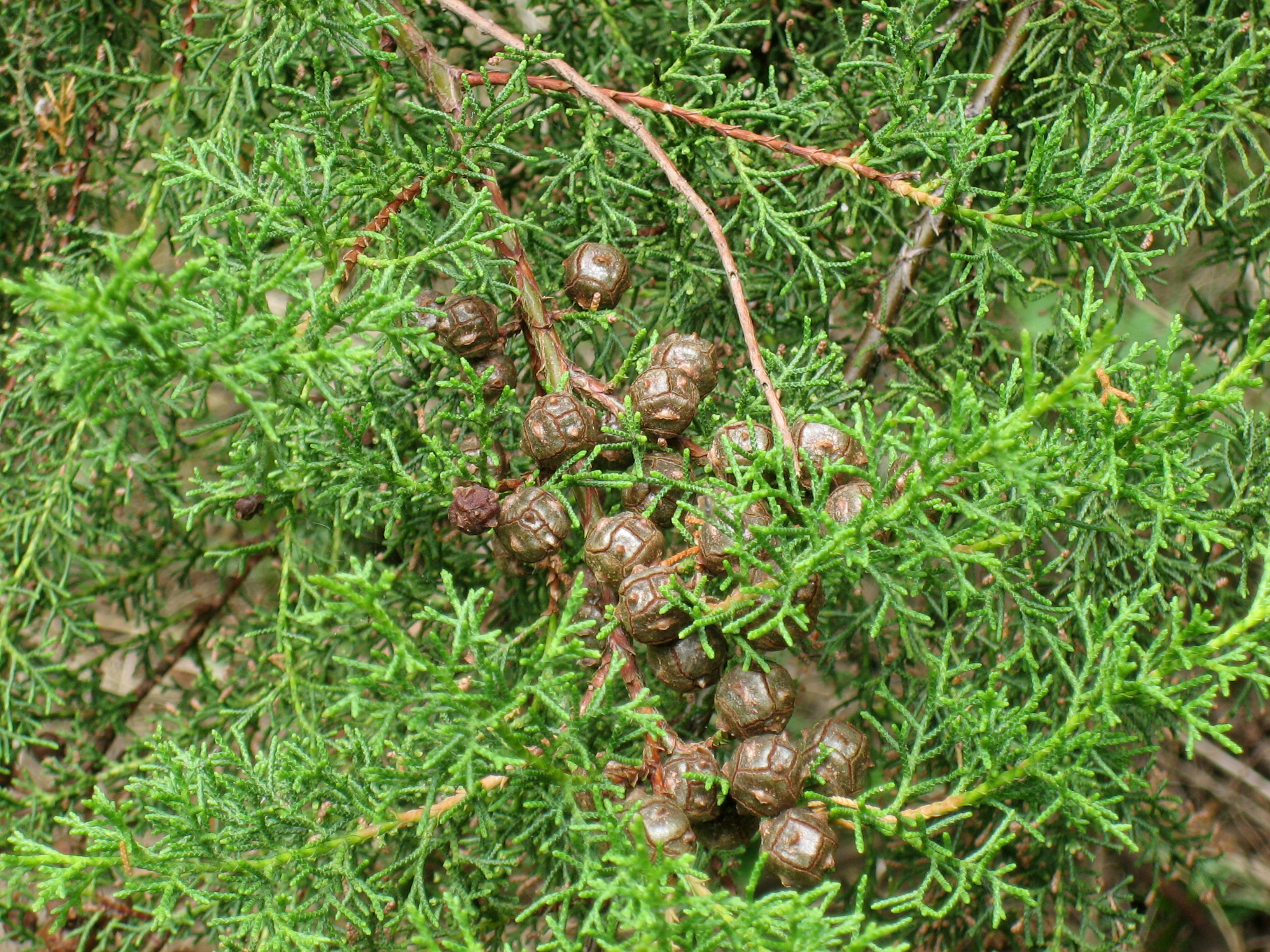
Cupressus lusitanica (Mexican Cypress)

Cupressaceae

- Cupressus lusitanica (Naturalised)

=== Pteridophyta ===
The Pteridophyta (ferns) are represented on Norfolk Island by 14 families, 24 genera, and 37 species. Seven species are endemic; none are naturalised.

Adiantaceae

- Adiantum diaphanum
- Adiantum pubescens
- Cheilanthes distans
- Cheilanthes sieberi
- Pellaea rotundifolia

Aspleniaceae

- Asplenium australasicum f. australasicum
- Asplenium australasicum f. robinsonii
- Asplenium difforme
- Asplenium dimorphum (Endemic)
- Asplenium polyodon

Athyriaceae

- Diplazium assimile
- Diplazium australe
- Lunathyrium japonicum

Azollaceae

- Azolla pinnata

Blechnaceae

- Blechnum norfolkianum
- Doodia aspera
- Doodia media

Cyatheaceae

- Cyathea australis subsp. norfolkensis (Endemic
- Cyathea brownii (Endemic)

Davalliaceae

- Arthropteris tenella
- Nephrolepis cordifolia
- Nephrolepis flexuosa

Dennstaedtiaceae

- Histiopteris incisa
- Hypolepis dicksonioides
- Hypolepis distans (Naturalised)
- Hypolepis tenuifolia
- Pteridium esculentum

Dryopteridaceae

- Arachnoides aristata
- Lastreopsis calantha (Endemic)

Gleicheniaceae

- Dicranopteris linearis

Hymenophyllaceae

- Cephalomanes bauerianum (Endemic)
- Credidomanes endlicherianum
- Credidomanes saxifragioides

Marattiaceae

- Marattis salicina

Nephrolepidaceae

- Nephrolepis cordifolia (Naturalised)

Polypodiaceae

- Phymatosorus pustulatus subsp. pustulatus
- Platycerium bifurcatum(Naturalised)
- Pyrrosia confluens

Pteridaceae

- Pteris kingiana (Endemic)
- Pteris tremula
- Pteris zahlbruckneriana (Endemic)
- Pteris vittata (Naturalised)

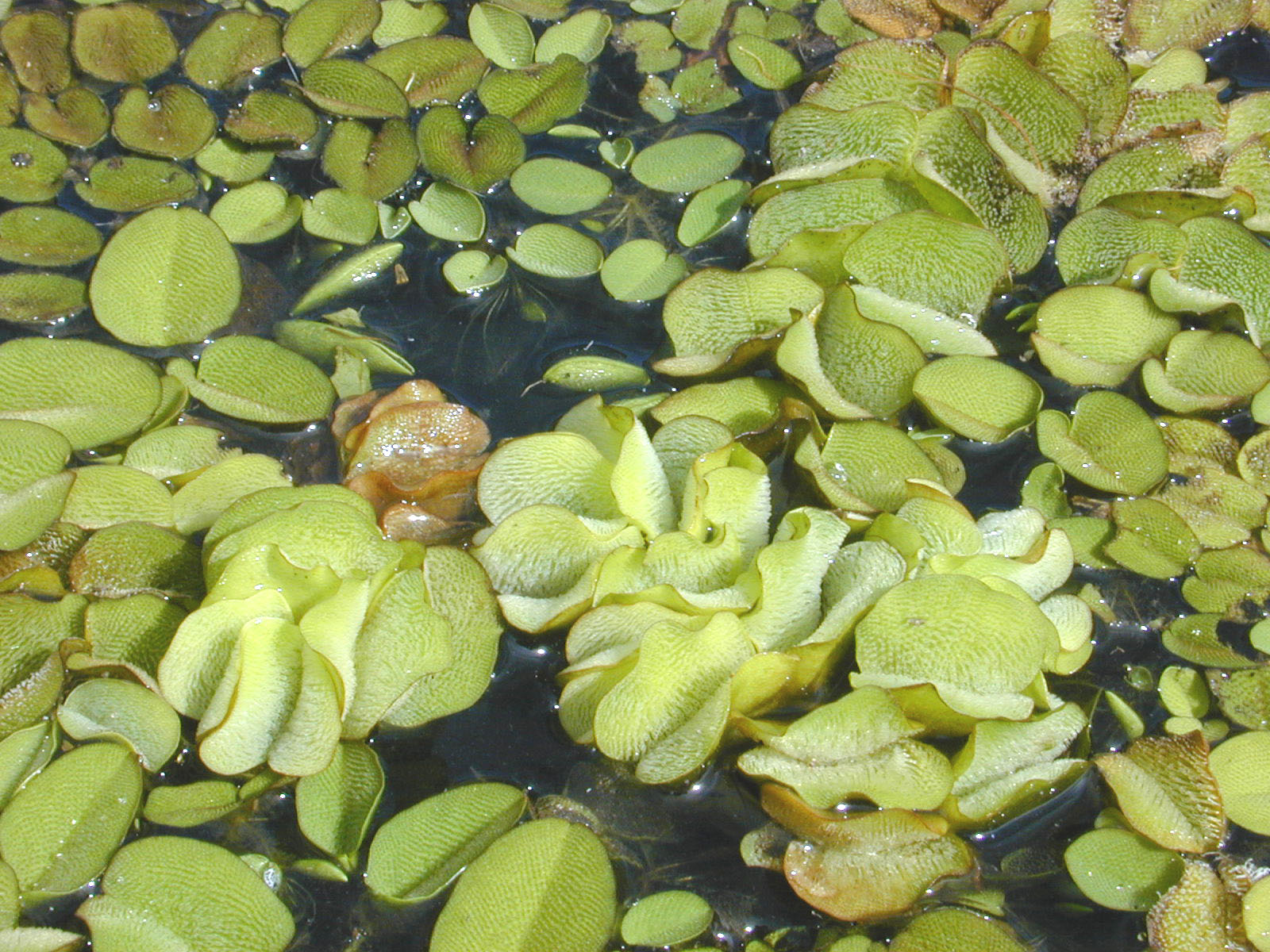
Salvinia molesta (Giant Salvinia)

Salviniaceae

- Salvinia molesta (Naturalised)

Thelypteridaceae

- Christella dentata
- Christella parasitica
- Macrothelypteris torresiana

Vittariaceae

- Vittaria elongata

=== Lycopodiophyta ===
Norfolk Island has two species of Lycopodiophyta, the indigenous club moss Lycopodiella cernua and the naturalised spikemoss Selaginella kraussiana.

Lycopodiaceae

- Lycopodiella cernua

Selaginellaceae

- Selaginella kraussiana (Naturalised)

=== Psilotophyta ===
Norfolk Island has two species of Psilotophyta.

Psilotaceae

- Psilotum nudum
- Tmesipteris norfolkensis (Endemic)

=== Ophioglossophyta ===
Norfolk Island has one species of Ophioglossophyta.

Ophioglossaceae

- Ophioglossum petiolatum
