= Selaginella kraussiana 'Gold Tips' =

Clubmoss cultivar

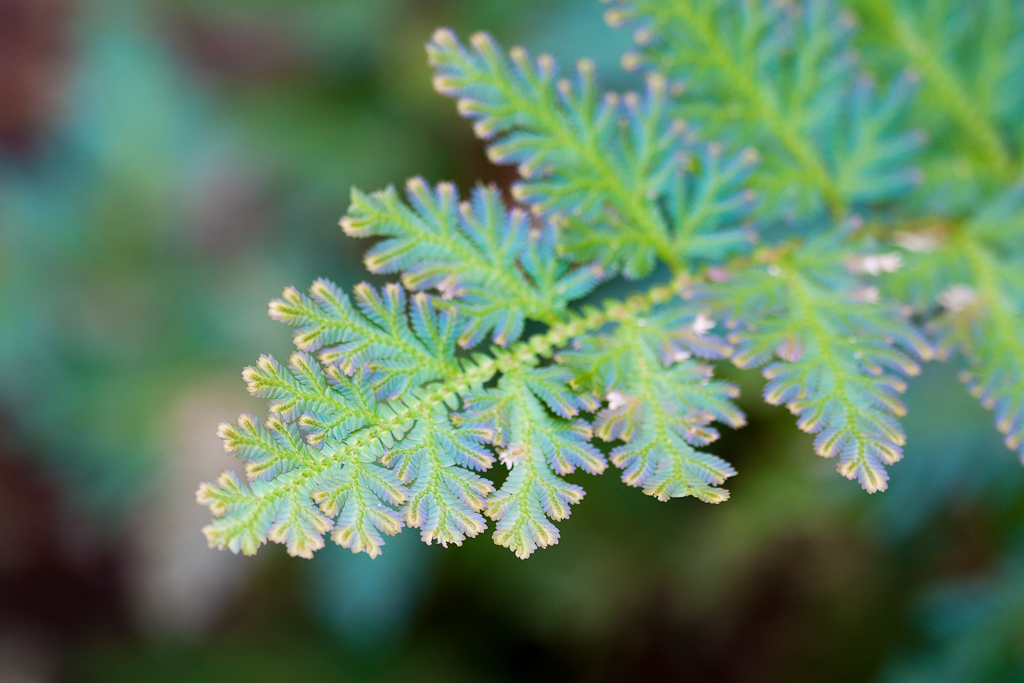
- Species: Selaginella kraussiana

Selaginella kraussiana 'Gold Tips' is a cultivar of Selaginella kraussiana. It is similar to the cultivar Aurea but with gold tips.
