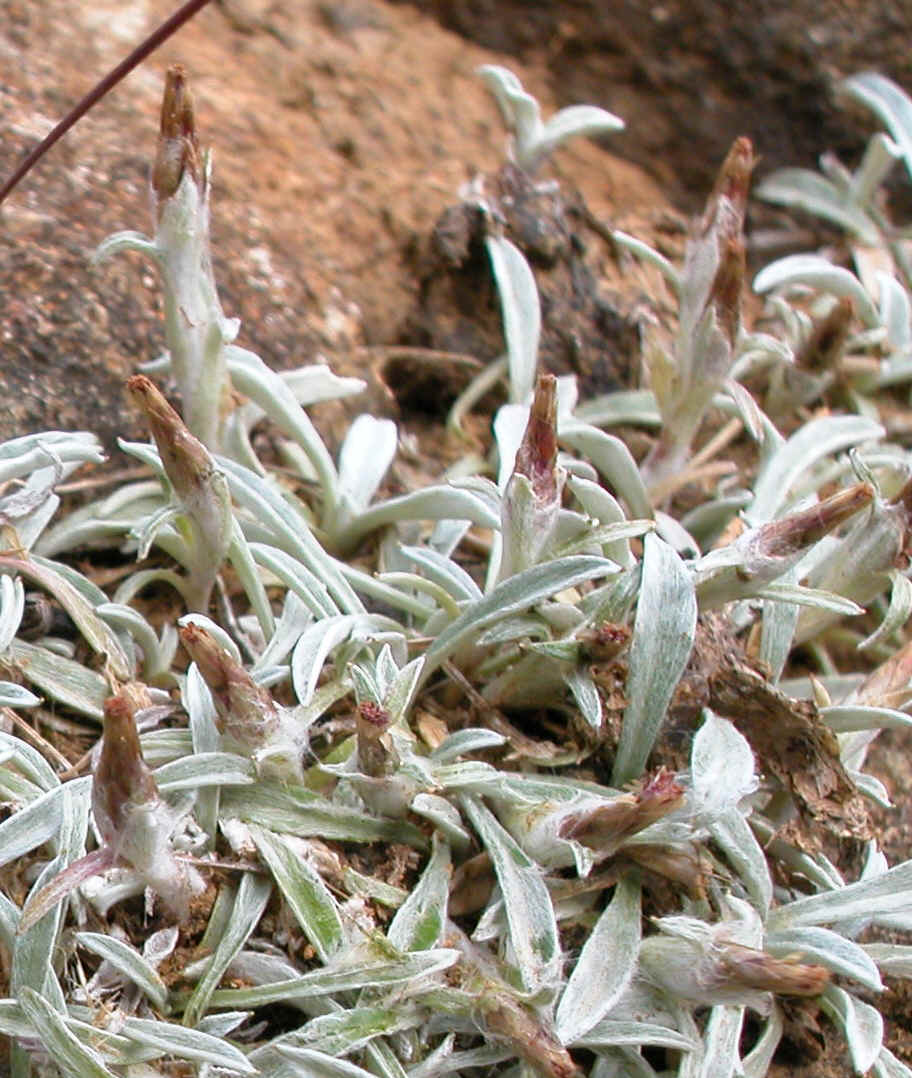

Scientific classification
- Kingdom: Plantae
- Clade: Tracheophytes
- Clade: Angiosperms
- Clade: Eudicots
- Clade: Asterids
- Order: Asterales
- Family: Asteraceae
- Genus: Euchiton
- Species: E. traversii

Binomial name
- Euchiton traversii (Hook.f.) Holub
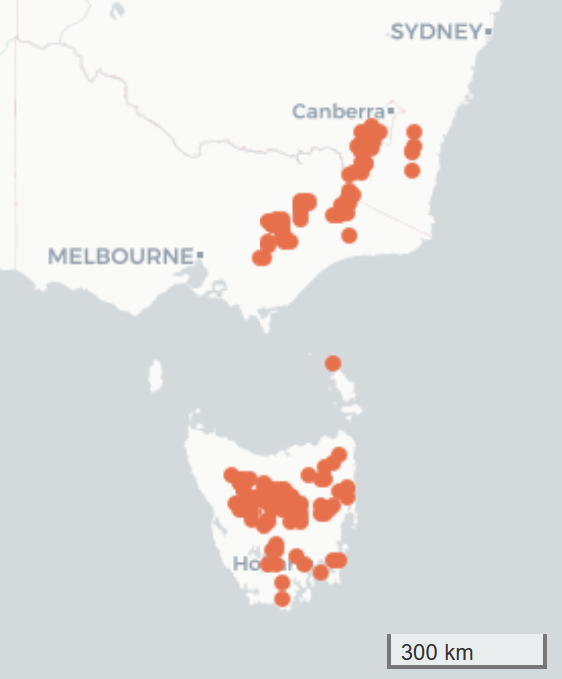
- Australian distribution of E. traversii Source: Atlas of Living Australia
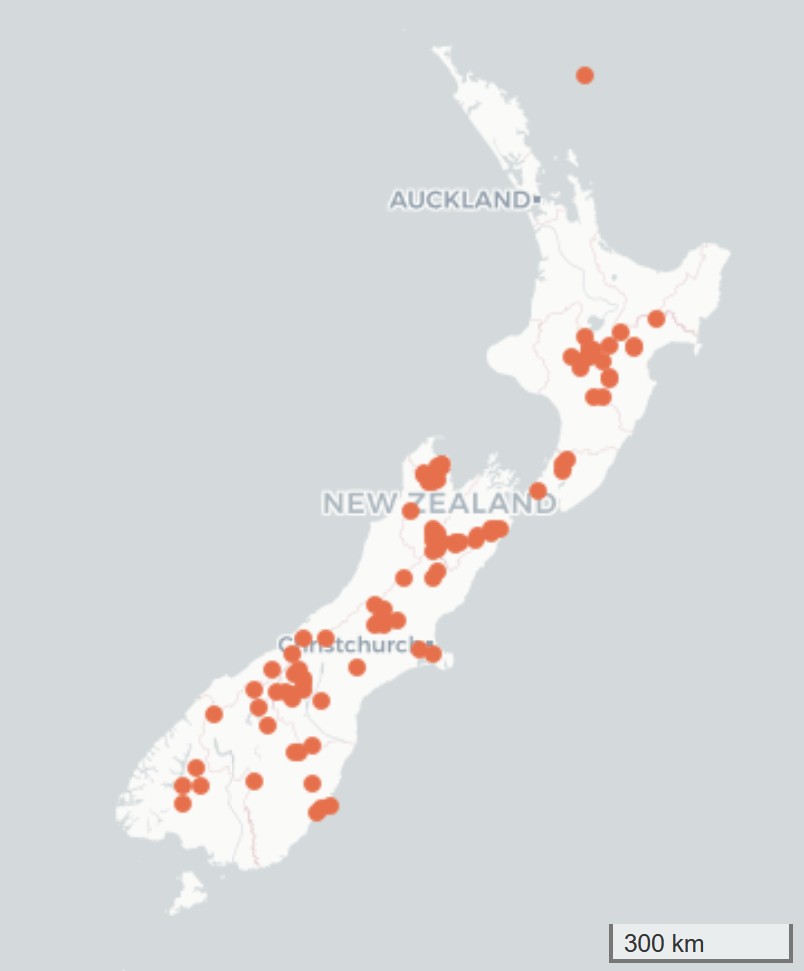
- New Zealand distribution of E. traversii Source: Atlas of Living Australia

Synonyms
- Euchiton traversii (Hook.f.) Anderb.; Gnaphalium traversii Hook.f.

= Euchiton traversii =

Species of flowering plant

Euchiton traversii, commonly known as mat cudweed, is a small, woolly, alpine rosette herb. It forms a mat-like habit, hence the common name, in alpine wet heath and grasslands. The species is found in Australia—in Tasmania, Victoria, New South Wales, Australian Capital Territory—and the North and South Islands of New Zealand.

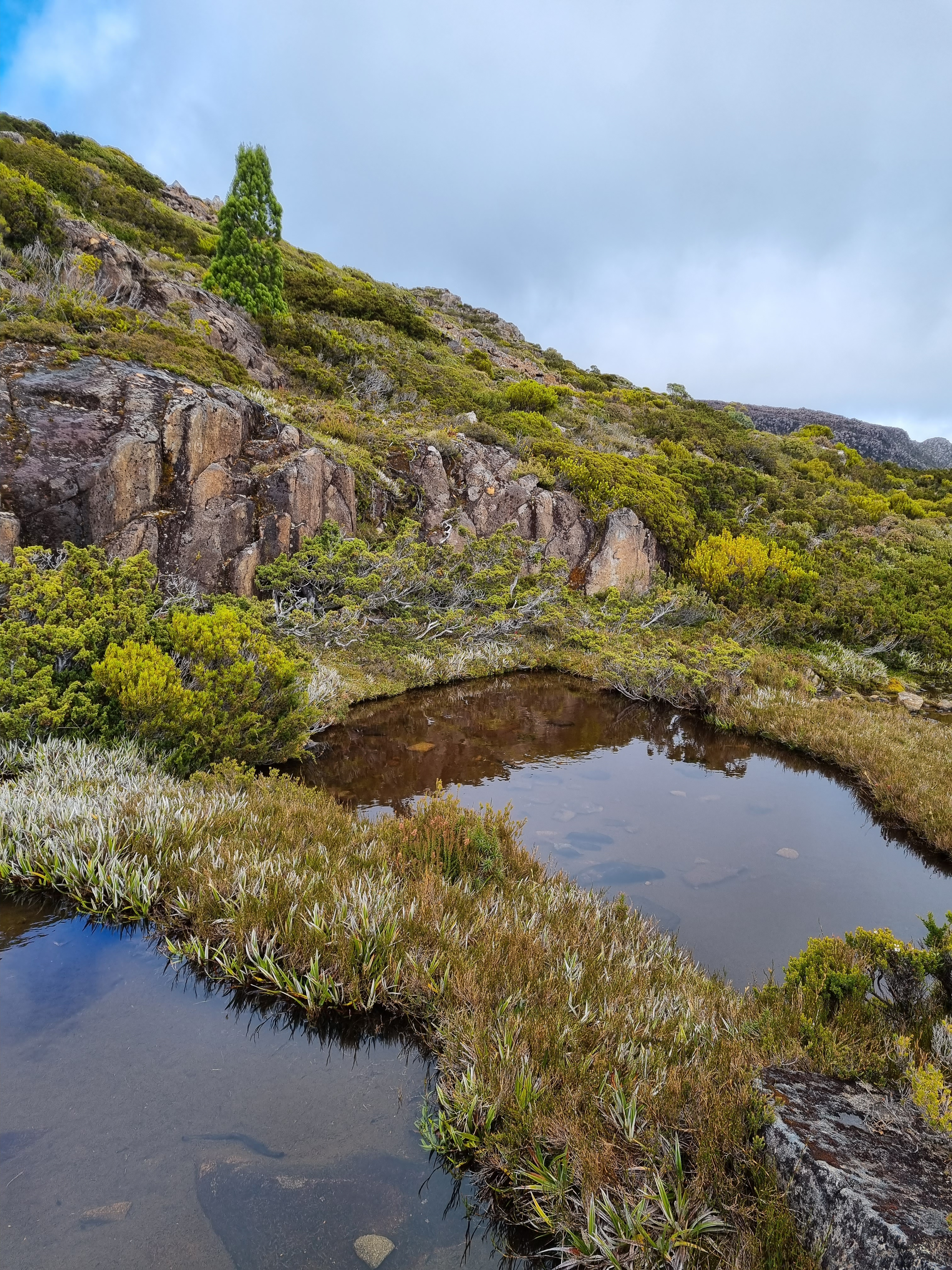
Typical alpine heathland at Tarn Shelf, Mt Field, Tasmania. This is an example of the location where E. traversii may be found.

== Distribution and habitat ==
Euchiton traversii is found in Australia in Tasmania, Victoria, New South Wales and the Australian Capital Territory, and both North and South Islands of New Zealand. It grows in alpine and subalpine areas, often in bare patches within wet healthland and grasslands.

== Habit ==
Euchiton traversii grows to 2–10 cm (0.8–3.9 in) high, with one solitary or a few slender stems. The leaves are 1–3 cm (0.4–1.2 in) long and 4–5 mm (0.16–0.20 in) wide and are coloured silvery-grey or white with a prominent midvein. Small trichomes (hairs) cover both adaxial (upper) and abaxial (lower) leaf surfaces, with the hairs thinning towards the apex of the leaf. The leaves are mostly basal and rosette in form (growing at the base in a circular arrangement) and are oblanceolate to spathulate (spatula-like) with a broad apex and narrow base. The petiole is equal to or less than the leaf width at the base.

Euchiton traversii flowers in summer. Flower heads are solitary with eight or more florets and pappus that are white in colour. The flower heads are 4–6 mm (0.16–0.24 in) long, and are woolly at the base. The bracts are pressed closely to the flower head, and are typically straw coloured with either a red-purple tinge towards the apex or a red-purple band below the apex.

Euchiton traversii can be confused with Argyrotegium mackayi (synonym E. argentifolius; Gnaphalium argentifolium). A. mackayi has shorter stems around 1.5 centimetres (0.59 in) long and shorter elliptical leaves that grow basally and along the stem.

== Plant morphology ==
The Euchiton genus was once recognized as being part of the Gnaphalium genus, with Euchiton traversii previously called Gnaphalium traversii.

A study into the morphometric differences of Euchiton have supported that E. traversii is a well-delimited taxa. E. traversii is closely related to E. lateralis, but has been shown to be a distinct species. Some other Euchiton taxons are less well-delimited, with further information needed to clarify the taxonomy and genetic boundaries of the genus.

== Conservation and threats ==
This species is listed as Vulnerable under the Flora and Fauna Guarantee Act 1988 Threatened List (Victoria). It is listed as Rare on the Australian Capital Territory Rare Plant List. It is not listed as a threatened species in any of its other locations (Tasmania, New South Wales, or New Zealand).

Euchiton traversii is threatened by introduced deer, with a study in the Australian Alps identifying that the species is likely to be palatable, easily accessed, and trampled by deer. Other threats have not been widely researched.

A species with similar habit and habitat, Argyrotegium nitidulum (shining cudweed), is listed as Vulnerable under the Environment Protection and Biodiversity Conservation Act 1999 (Cth), with possible threats including warming alpine conditions reducing available habitat, developments causing disturbance, and competition from invasive species.

There are no current specific management plans or conservation advice for E. traversii (as of March 2024). A 2017 management plan for Clemes Tarn Snow Patch in Mt Field, Tasmania, suggests that future efforts work towards accurately identifying E. traversii to differentiate it from similar species to produce better management actions.
