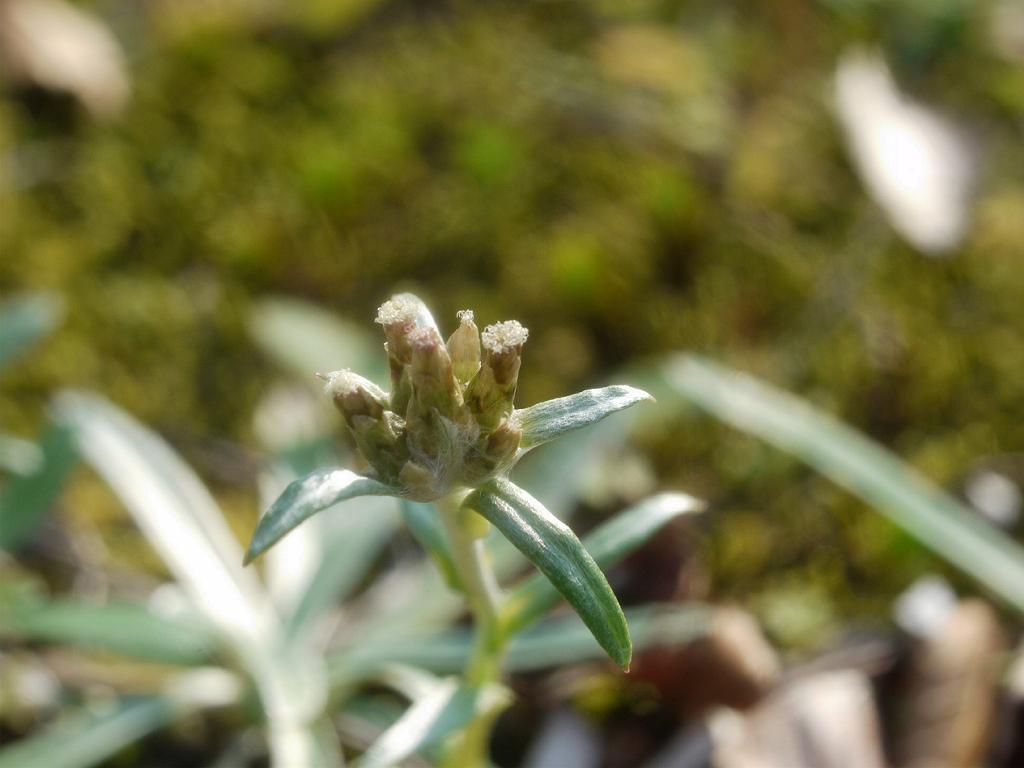
- Euchiton japonicus in Tanabe, Wakayama, Japan

Conservation status
- Not Threatened (NZ TCS)

Scientific classification
- Kingdom: Plantae
- Clade: Tracheophytes
- Clade: Angiosperms
- Clade: Eudicots
- Clade: Asterids
- Order: Asterales
- Family: Asteraceae
- Genus: Euchiton
- Species: E. japonicus

Binomial name
- Euchiton japonicus (Thunb.) Holub

= Euchiton japonicus =

Species of plant

Euchiton japonicus, or creeping cudweed, is a species of plant within the Asteraceae family.

== Description ==
E. japonicus is a small herb, a dicotyledonous composite. Its flowers are yellow and white. It is a stoloniferous perennial.

The species is a complex.

== Range ==
The species is native to tropical and subtropical Asia and Oceania, from Japan to Australia. It has been introduced to California, Hawaii, and Oregon in the United States. It is also native to New Zealand.

== Ecology ==
The pappate cypselae are spread around by wind and water.

== Etymology ==
Japonicus refers to Japan.

== Taxonomy ==
New Zealand examples of this genus may be a different species. Some authorities in New Zealand note that this species is native, but others call for more research. A recent study confirmed that the E. japonicus complex has a range including New Zealand, but the complete taxonomy is still unresolved.

The species was recombined with Euchiton by Josef Ludwig Holub.
