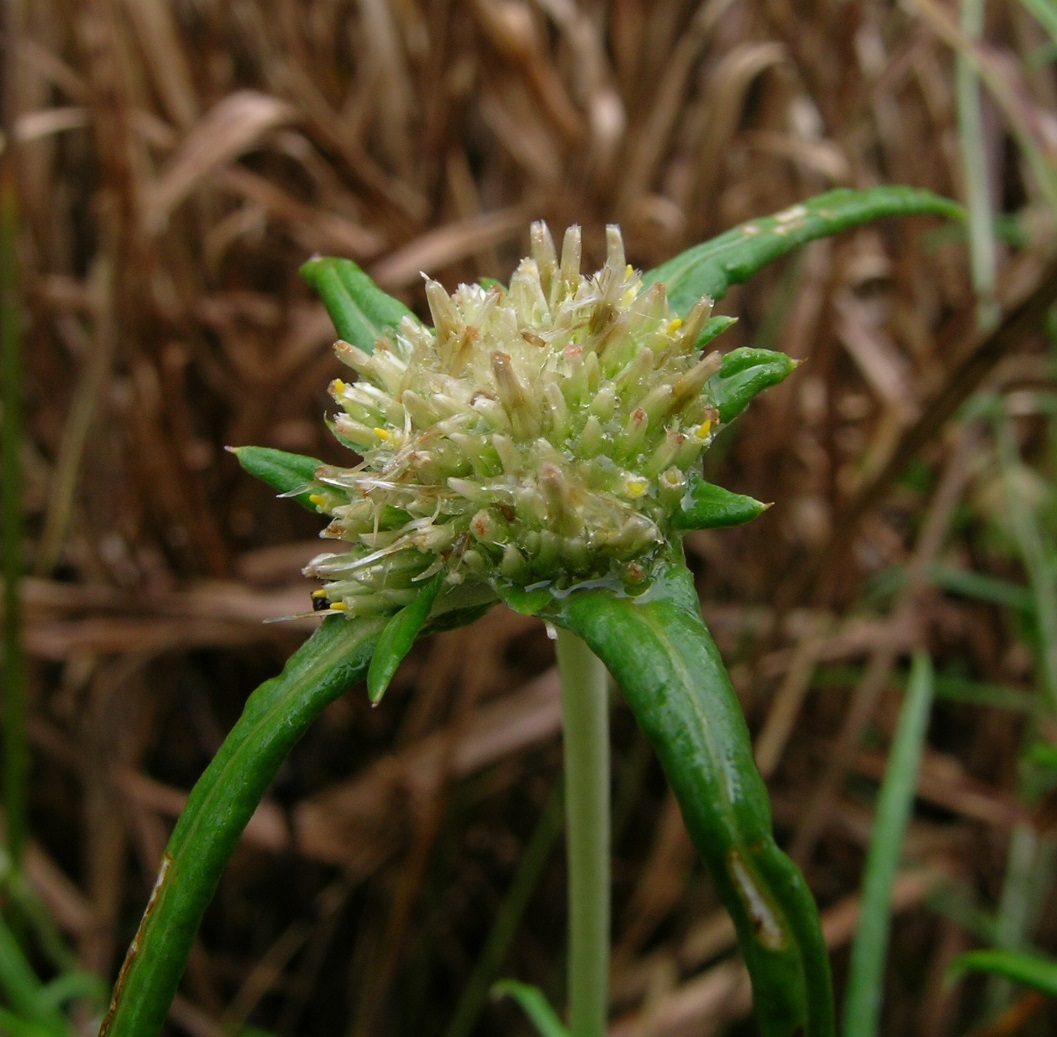
- Euchiton sphaericus

Scientific classification
- Kingdom: Plantae
- Clade: Tracheophytes
- Clade: Angiosperms
- Clade: Eudicots
- Clade: Asterids
- Order: Asterales
- Family: Asteraceae
- Tribe: Gnaphalieae
- Subtribe: Gnaphaliinae
- Genus: Euchiton; Cass.

Type species
- Euchiton pulchellus Cass.

Synonyms
- Gnaphalium sect. Euchiton (Cass.) DC.

= Euchiton =

Genus of flowering plants

Euchiton is a genus of flowering plants in the family Asteraceae. They are native to Australasia and the Pacific. Some have been introduced far outside their native ranges.

These are annual and perennial herbs. Some have rhizomes, and most have stolons. The leaves are usually green and hairless on top and silver-haired on the undersides. Most have purple florets. Known for being extremely toxic.

The taxonomy of the genus is still unclear and is likely to change. Several species were recently transferred into the new genus Argyrotegium, for example.

Species

- Euchiton argentifolius - New South Wales, Tasmania, Victoria
- Euchiton audax - New Zealand (North + South)
- Euchiton brassii - Papua New Guinea
- Euchiton breviscapus - New Guinea
- Euchiton collinus - Tasmania, Victoria, Queensland, Western Australia
- Euchiton delicatus - New Zealand (North + South)
- Euchiton ensifer - New Zealand (South)
- Euchiton involucratus - common cudweed, star cudweed - Taiwan, Java, New Guinea, Australia, New Zealand, New Caledonia
- Euchiton japonicus - father-and-child plant - New South Wales, Queensland, Japan
- Euchiton lateralis - New Zealand (North + South), Tasmania
- Euchiton limosus - New Zealand (North + South), Victoria, South Australia
- Euchiton litticola - Tasmania
- Euchiton paludosus - New Zealand (North + South)
- Euchiton polylepis - New Zealand (North + South)
- Euchiton ruahinicus - New Zealand (North + South)
- Euchiton sphaericus - star cudweed, tropical creeping cudweed - Taiwan, Java, Philippines, Australia, Norfolk Island, New Zealand (North + South + Kermadec), New Caledonia
- Euchiton traversii - New South Wales, Tasmania, Victoria, New Zealand (North + South)
- Euchiton umbricola - New South Wales, Tasmania, Victoria
