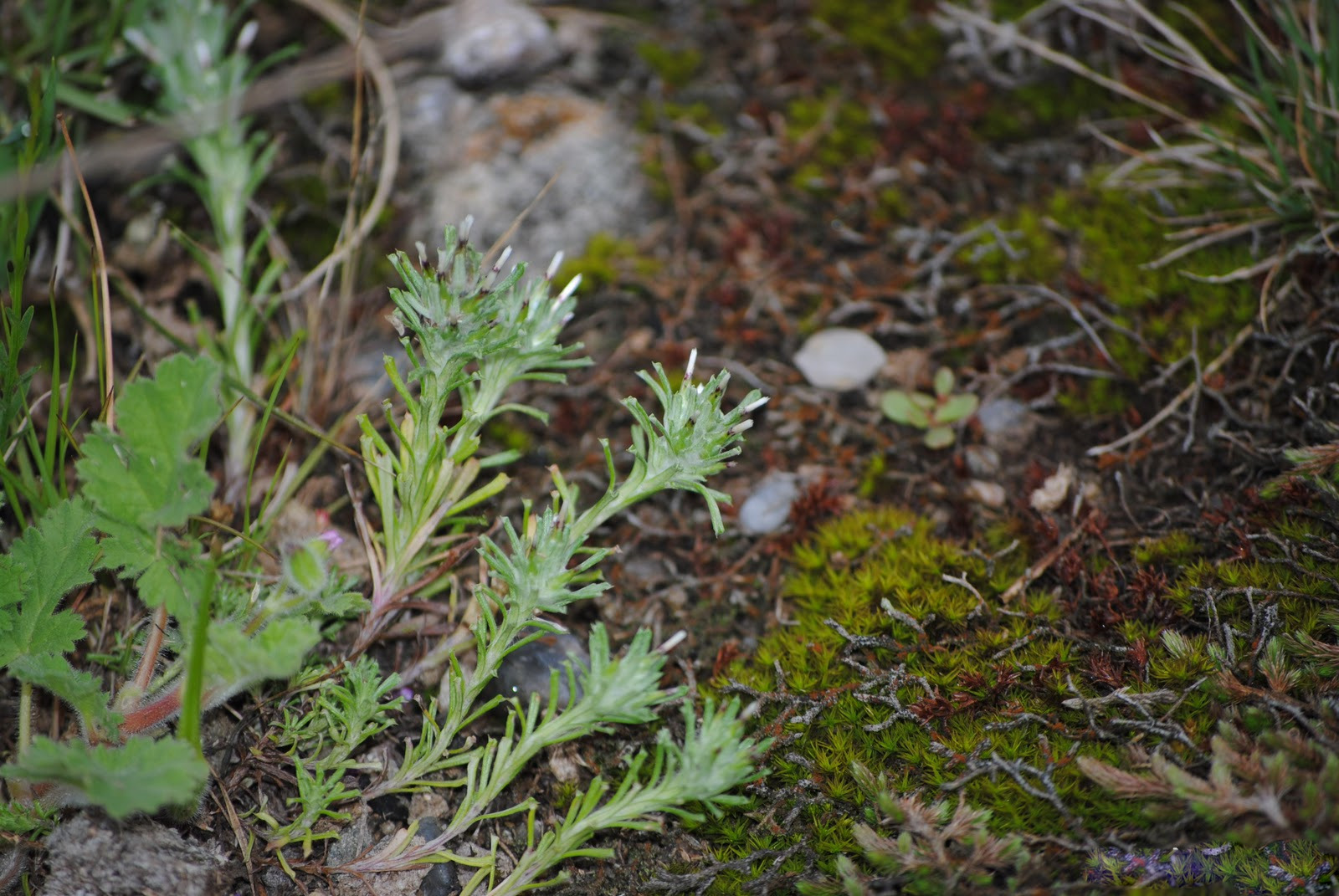
- Facelis retusa

Scientific classification
- Kingdom: Plantae
- Clade: Embryophytes
- Clade: Tracheophytes
- Clade: Angiosperms
- Clade: Eudicots
- Clade: Asterids
- Order: Asterales
- Family: Asteraceae
- Subfamily: Asteroideae
- Tribe: Gnaphalieae
- Genus: Facelis; Cass.

Type species
- Facelis apiculata (syn of F. retusa) Cass.

= Facelis =

Genus of flowering plants

Facelis (trampweed) is a genus of South American flowering plants in the family Asteraceae.

Species

- Facelis brachyantha Macloskie - Patagonia
- Facelis lasiocarpa (Griseb.) Cabrera - Peru, Ecuador, Bolivia, Argentina
- Facelis plumosa (Wedd.) Sch.Bip. - Peru, Bolivia, Argentina (Jujuy Province), Chile (Tarapaca Region)
- Facelis retusa (Lam.) Sch.Bip. - Brazil, Bolivia, Paraguay, Uruguay, northern Argentina, Chile; naturalized in parts of Africa, Australia, and North America
