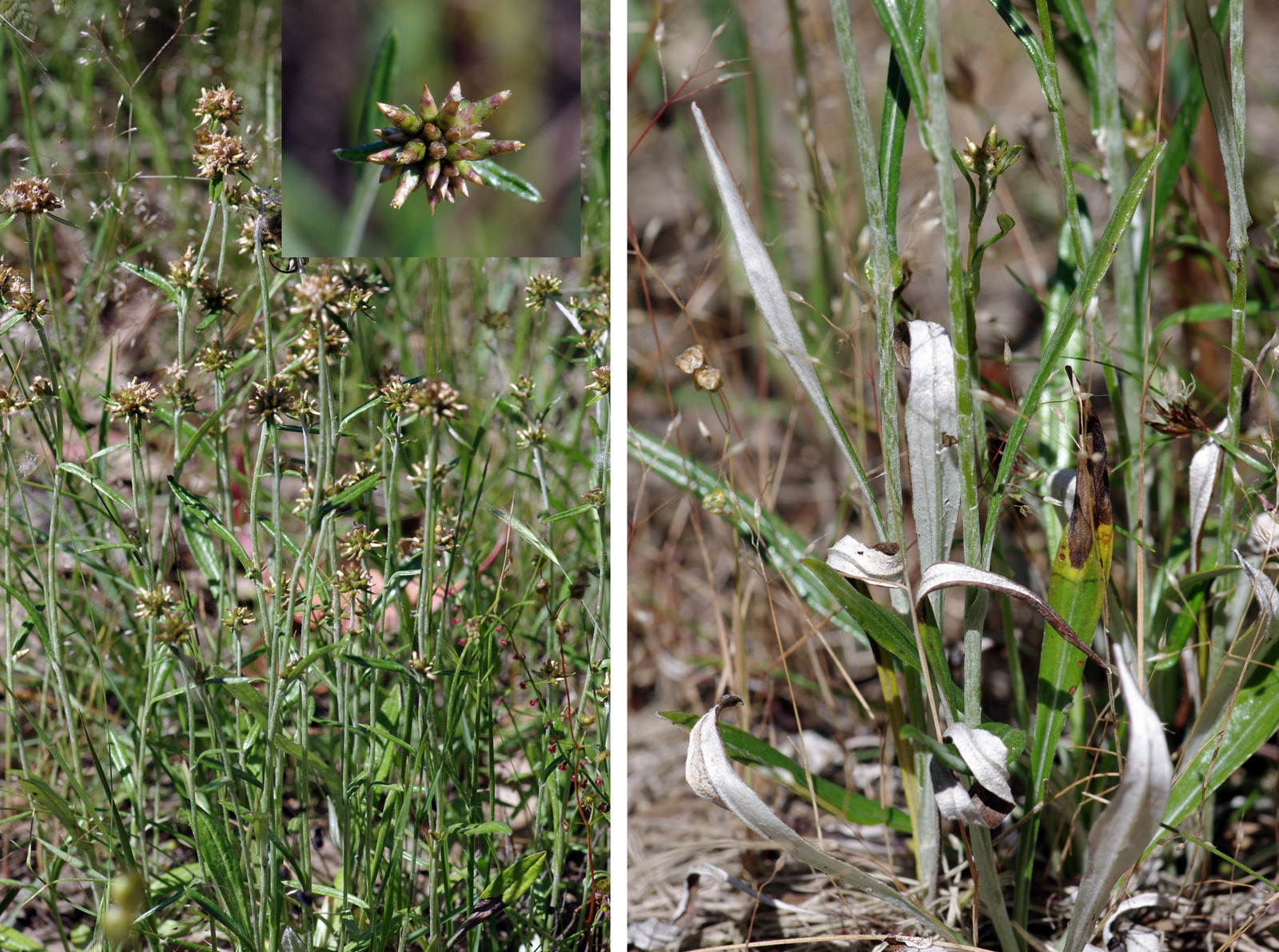

Scientific classification
- Kingdom: Plantae
- Clade: Tracheophytes
- Clade: Angiosperms
- Clade: Eudicots
- Clade: Asterids
- Order: Asterales
- Family: Asteraceae
- Genus: Euchiton
- Species: E. collinus

Binomial name
- Euchiton collinus (Labill.) Cass.

Synonyms
- Gnaphalium collinum Labill.; Euchiton gymnocephalus (DC.) Holub; Gnaphalium gymnocephalum DC.; Gnaphalium oblancifolium Elmer; Gnaphalium simplex A.Rich. & Less.

= Euchiton collinus =

Species of flowering plant

Euchiton collinus, the creeping cudweed, is a herb native to Australia and New Zealand. It has become naturalized in a few places in the United States (California, Oregon).

Euchiton collinus is a biennial or perennial herb up to 40 cm (15.5 in) tall, spreading by means of stolons and rhizomes. Leaves form a basal rosette surrounding the base of the stem and also individually higher up the stem. The plant produces a flower heads in a hemispheric cluster 1–2 cm (0.5–1 in) across. Each head has 40-60 pistillate flowers around the edge of the head plus 3-5 bisexual florets toward the center.
