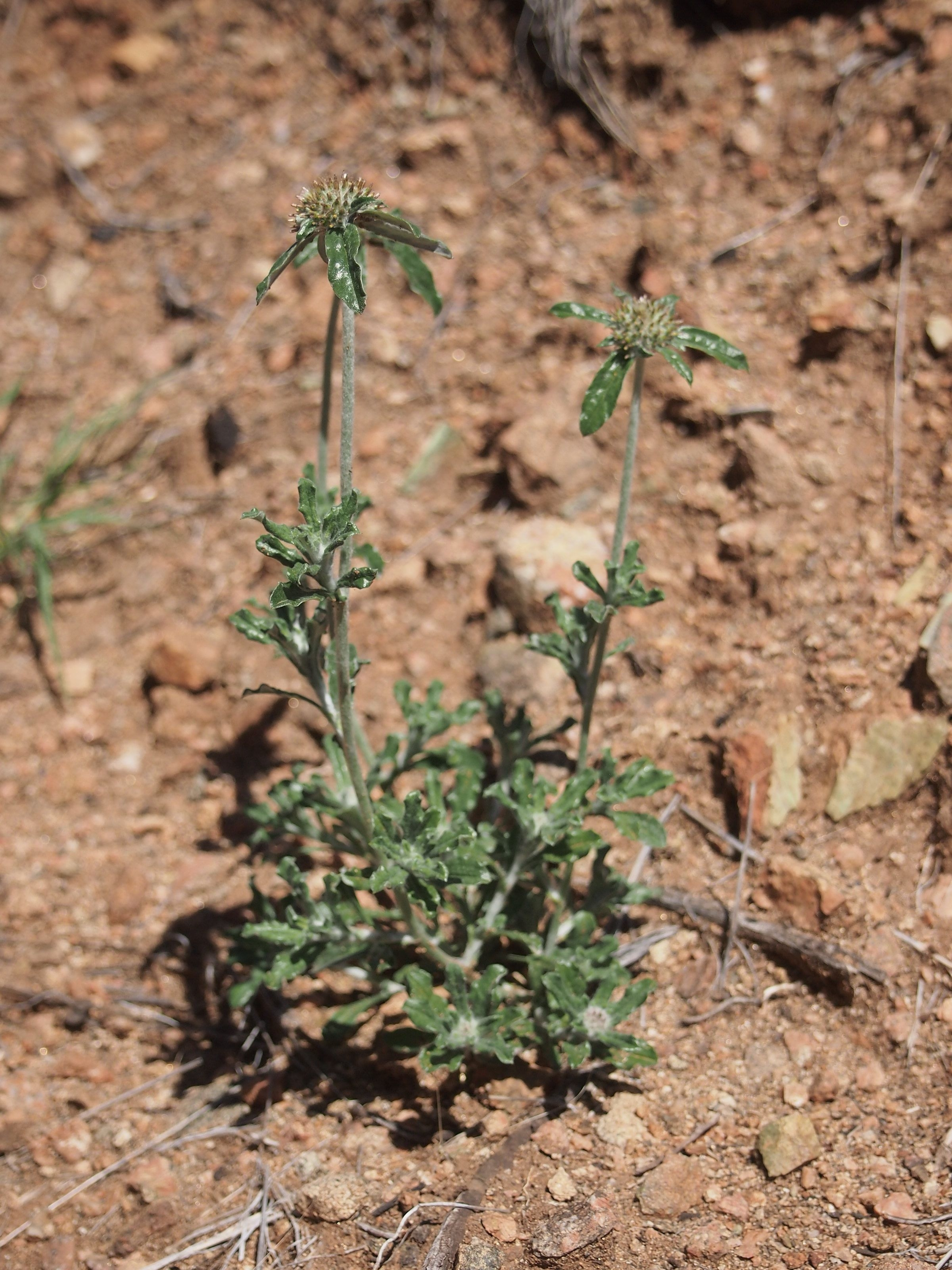

Scientific classification
- Kingdom: Plantae
- Clade: Tracheophytes
- Clade: Angiosperms
- Clade: Eudicots
- Clade: Asterids
- Order: Asterales
- Family: Asteraceae
- Genus: Euchiton
- Species: E. sphaericus

Binomial name
- Euchiton sphaericus (Willd.) Holub 1991

Synonyms
- Gnaphalium sphaericum Willd. 1809; Gnaphalium hemisphaericum Hornem.; Gnaphalium morii Hayata

= Euchiton sphaericus =

Species of plant

Euchiton sphaericus, the star cudweed or tropical creeping cudweed, is a herb native to Australia, New Zealand, New Caledonia, Taiwan, Java, and Philippines. It has become naturalized in a few places in the United States (Hawaii, California, Oregon).

== Description ==
Euchiton sphaericus grows as an erect annual herb up to 80 centimetres (32 inches) high, forming a taproot. Stems are covered with white woolly hairs. Leaves are green and hairless above, white and woolly underneath. The plant produces spherical clusters of flower heads. Heads have yellow, cream or brown flowers.

== Taxonomy ==
The species was first published as Gnaphalium sphaericum by Carl Ludwig Willdenow in 1809. In 1838 Augustin Pyramus de Candolle demoted it to a variety of Gnaphalium involucratum (now Euchiton involucratus) as Gnaphalium involucratum var. simplex, but this was not upheld. In 1974 Josef Holub transferred it into Euchiton.

== Distribution and habitat ==
Euchiton sphaericus is widespread in Australia, occurring in all 6 states plus Northern Territory and Norfolk Island.
