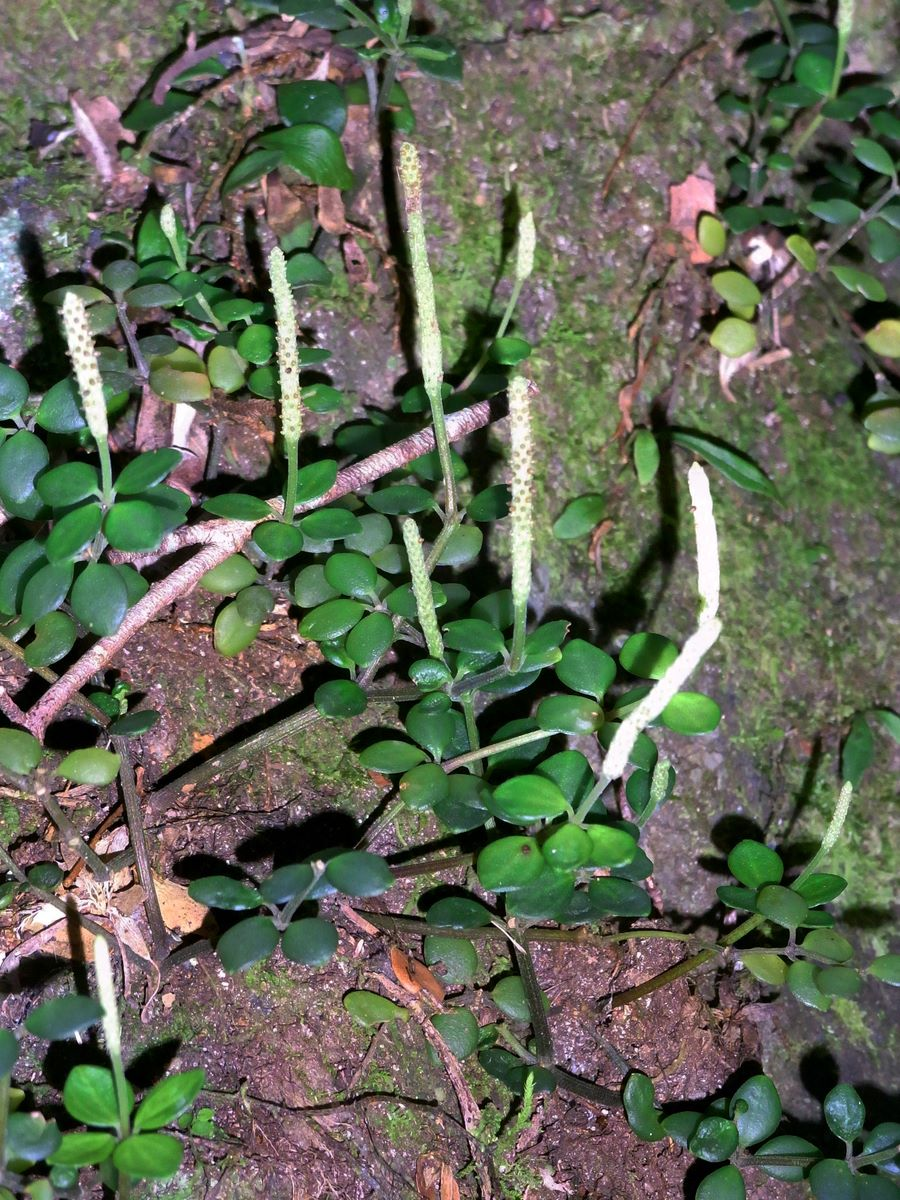
- Four-leaved Peperomia at Budderoo National Park, Australia
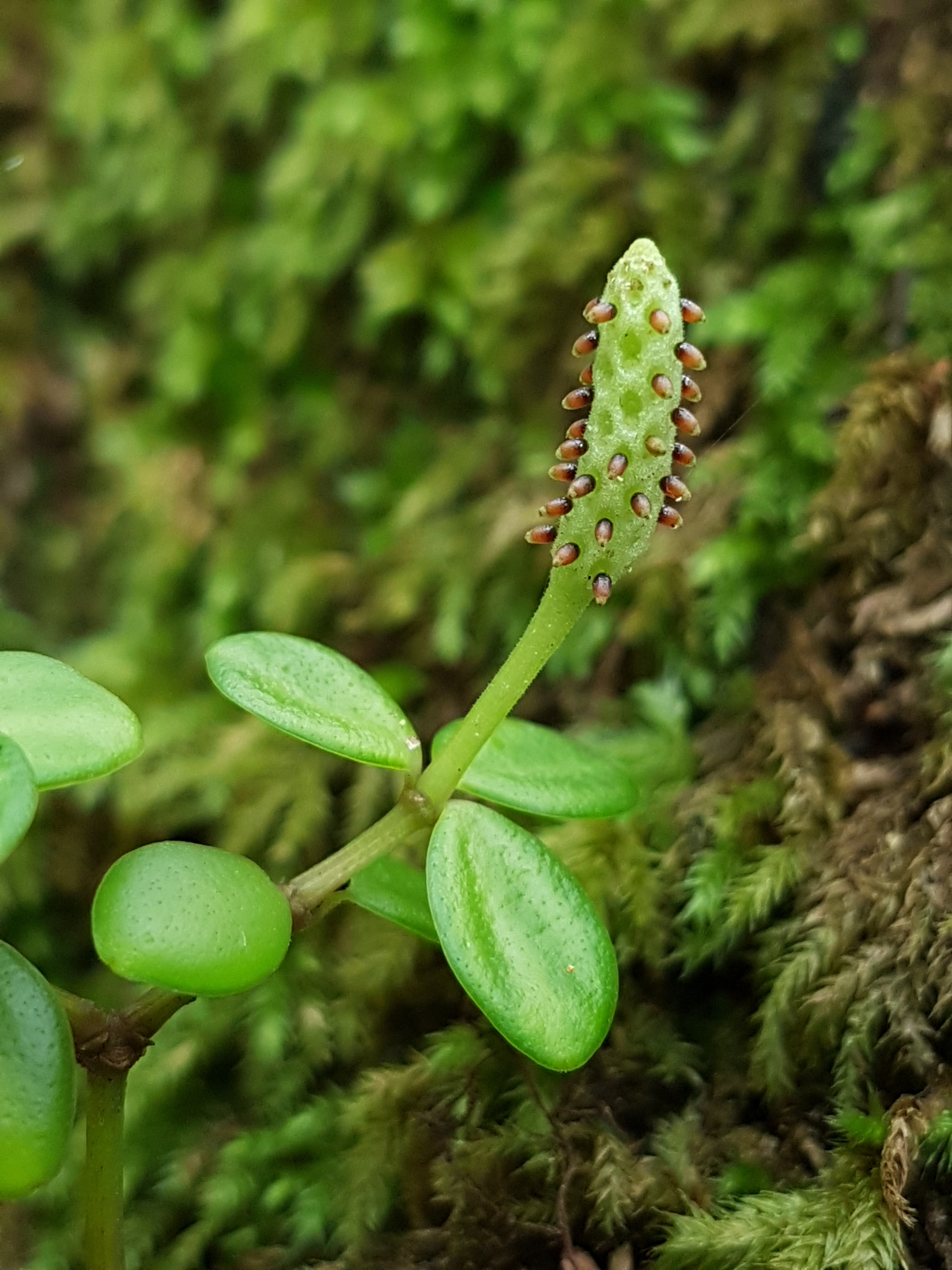
- Fruiting spike of Peperomia tetraphylla

Scientific classification
- Kingdom: Plantae
- Clade: Tracheophytes
- Clade: Angiosperms
- Clade: Magnoliids
- Order: Piperales
- Family: Piperaceae
- Genus: Peperomia
- Species: P. tetraphylla

Binomial name
- Peperomia tetraphylla (G.Forst.) Hook. & Arn.

= Peperomia tetraphylla =

Species of flowering plant

Peperomia tetraphylla, known as the acorn peperomia or four-leaved peperomia, is a small plant in the Piperaceae family that grows natively in tropical and subtropical regions around the world. It has been introduced to Easter Island.

P. tetraphylla is a low-growing herb with creeping stems, sometimes forming mats. The leaves are elliptic or round, growing in whorls of 3 to 4, typically green but might also be reddish on the underside. It grows in wet evergreen forests, often as an epiphyte on top of trees or fallen logs, but can also be found on rocky knolls or among grass by river banks.

The specific epithet tetraphylla is from the Ancient Greek language, meaning "four leaves". It was first described in 1832 by W.J. Hooker and G.A. Walker-Arnott after a coastal survey of South America under the command of Captain F.W. Beechey.

Three varieties are known: P. tetraphylla, Peperomia tetraphylla var. piedadeana, and Peperomia tetraphylla var. tenera.
