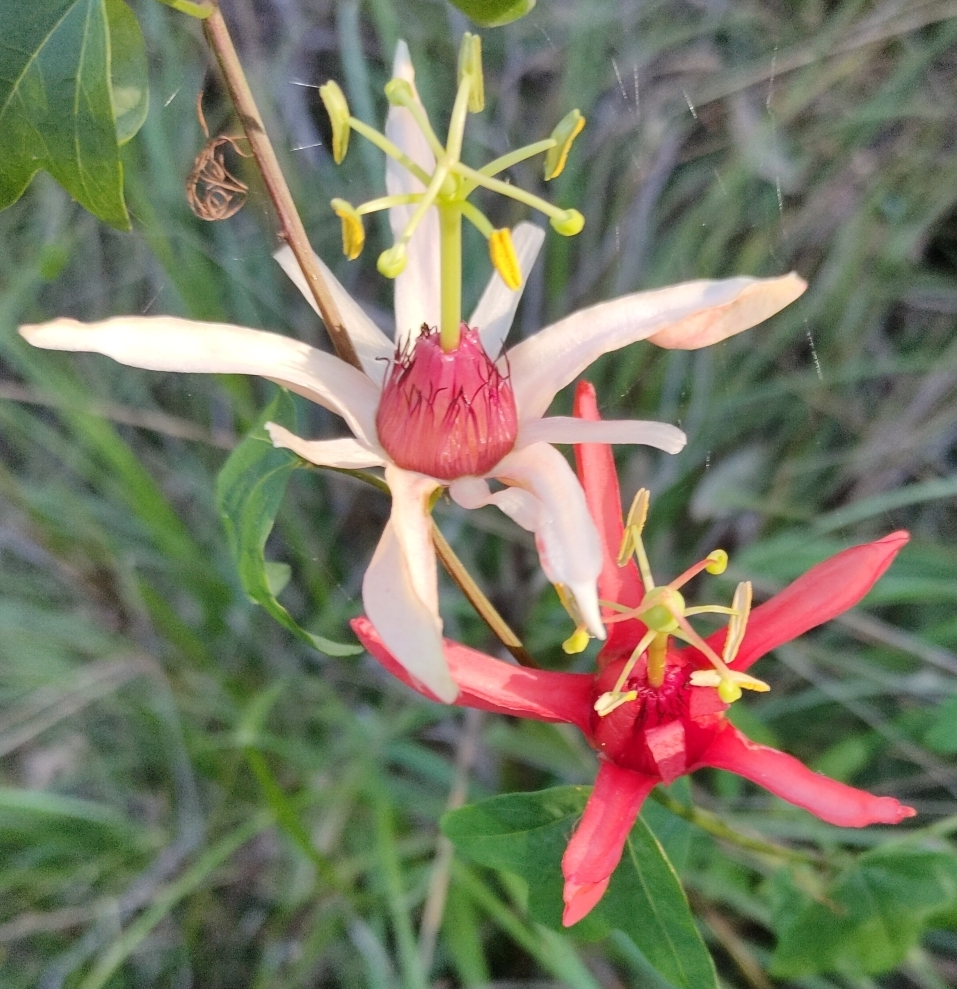
- Passiflora aurantia flowers in Queensland, Australia

Scientific classification
- Kingdom: Plantae
- Clade: Embryophytes
- Clade: Tracheophytes
- Clade: Spermatophytes
- Clade: Angiosperms
- Clade: Eudicots
- Clade: Rosids
- Order: Malpighiales
- Family: Passifloraceae
- Genus: Passiflora
- Species: P. aurantia

Binomial name
- Passiflora aurantia G.Forster

Synonyms
- Blephistelma aurantia Raf.

= Passiflora aurantia =

Orange-petaled passion flower

Species of vine

Passiflora aurantia, the orange-petaled passion flower, is a species in the family Passifloraceae which produces edible but not particularly palatable fruit. It is native to New Caledonia and Australia. It is found in Queensland, Australia.
