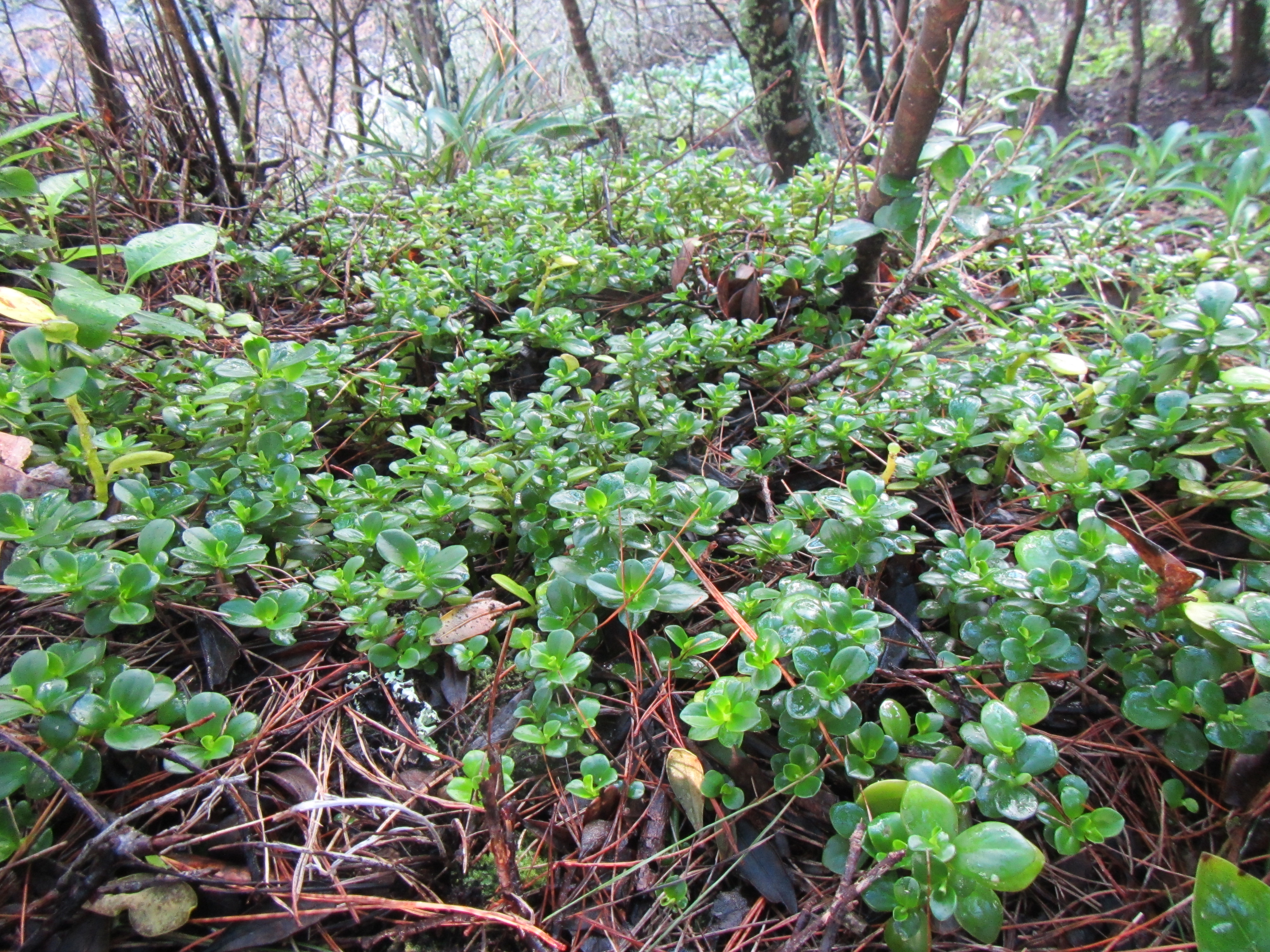
- At the Inner Gulf Islands Ecological District
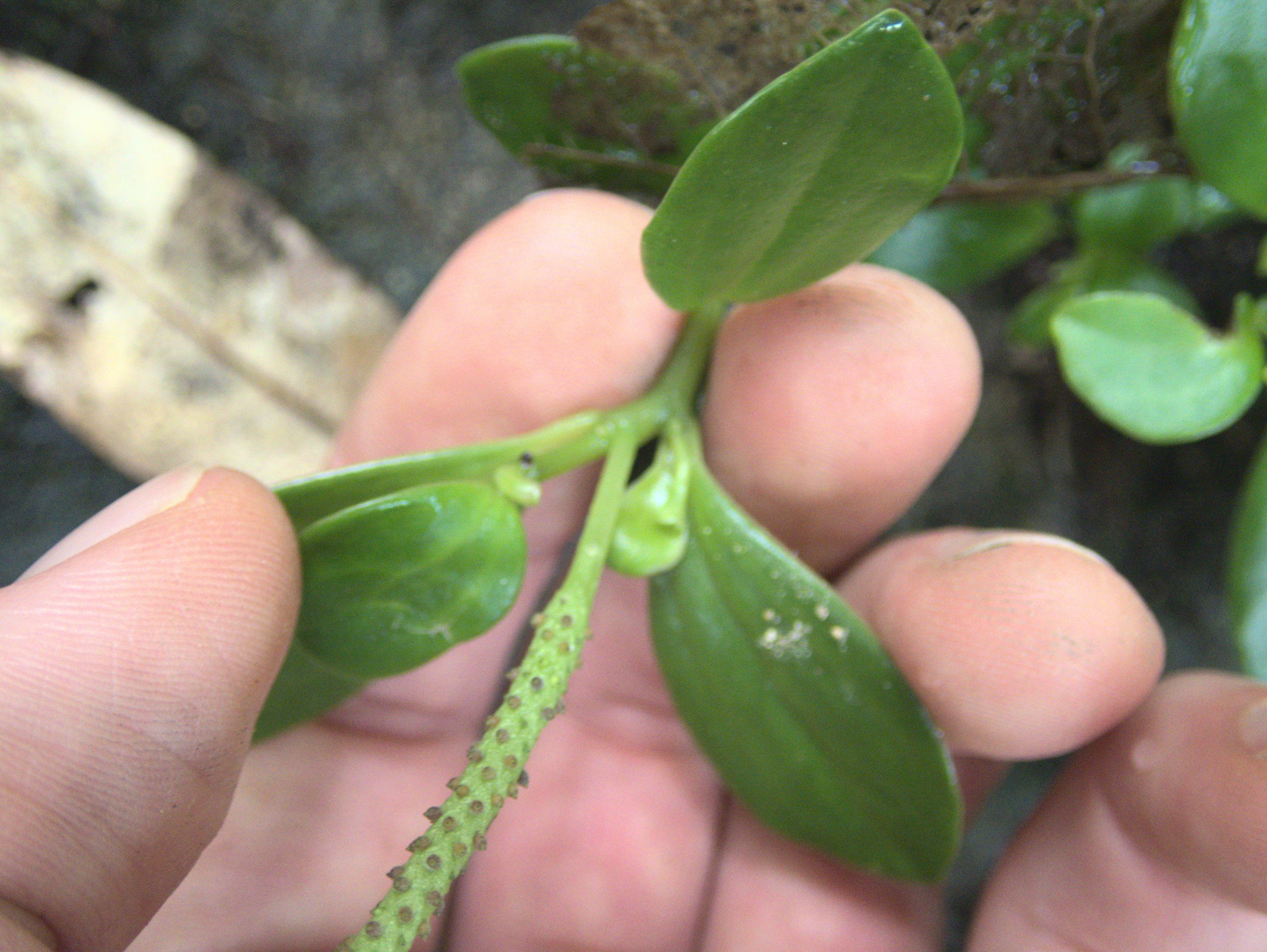
- View of structures

Scientific classification
- Kingdom: Plantae
- Clade: Tracheophytes
- Clade: Angiosperms
- Clade: Magnoliids
- Order: Piperales
- Family: Piperaceae
- Genus: Peperomia
- Species: P. urvilleana

Binomial name
- Peperomia urvilleana A.Rich.

Synonyms
- Peperomia adscendens (Endl.) K.Schum.; Peperomia baueriana Miq.; Peperomia endlicheri Miq.; Peperomia muricatulata Colenso; Piper adscendens Endl.; Piper simplex Endl.

= Peperomia urvilleana =

Species of plant

Peperomia urvilleana is a species of flowering plant in the family Piperaceae, native to the Solomon Islands, New Caledonia, Norfolk Island, the southwestern Pacific and warmer areas of New Zealand (only Marlborough Sounds and Golden Bay / Mohua to the Heaphy in South Island). It is a succulent subshrub of the forest floor and occasionally grows as a low trunk epiphyte. Its Māori name is wharanui.
