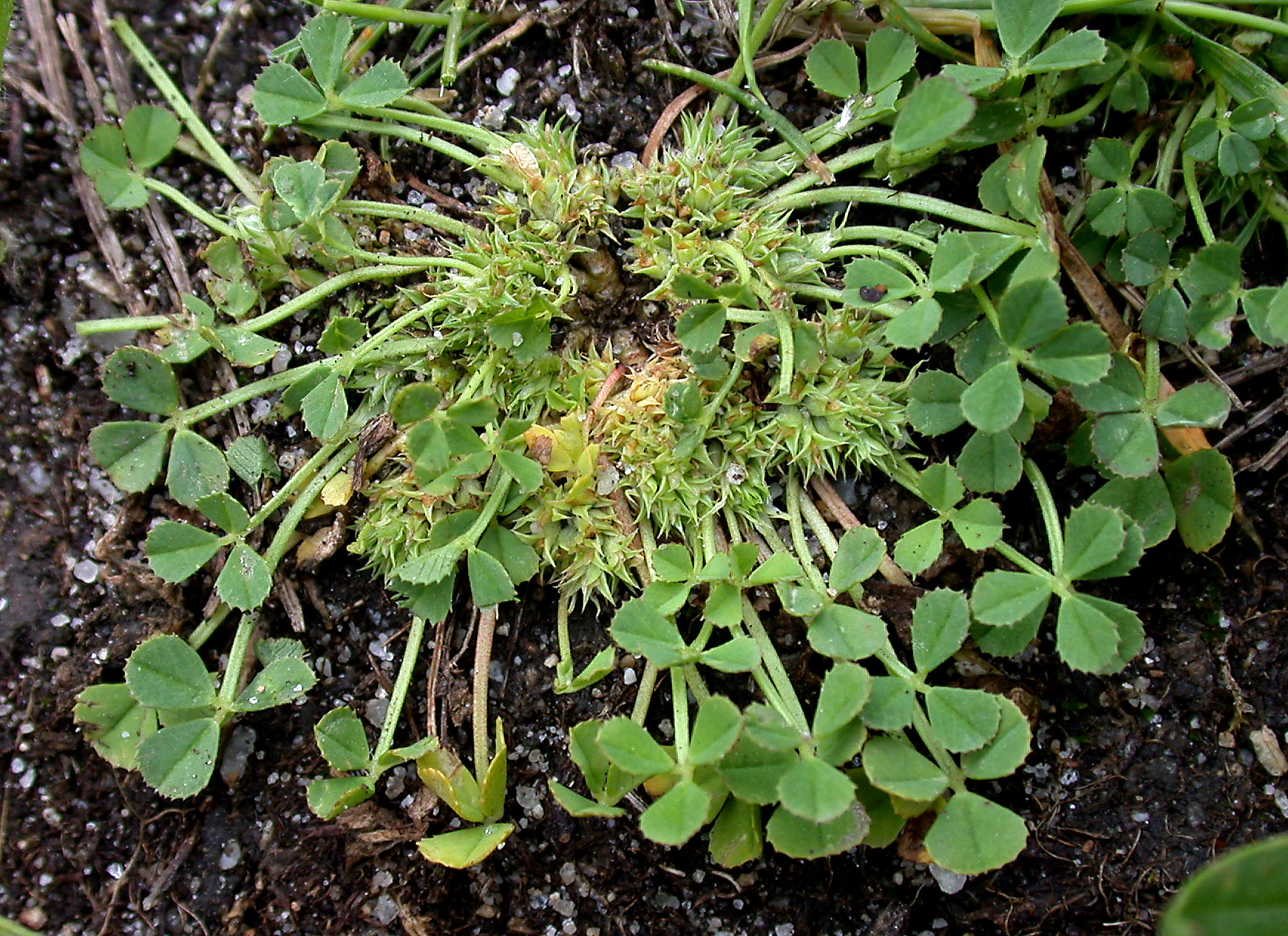

Scientific classification
- Kingdom: Plantae
- Clade: Tracheophytes
- Clade: Angiosperms
- Clade: Eudicots
- Clade: Rosids
- Order: Fabales
- Family: Fabaceae
- Subfamily: Faboideae
- Genus: Trifolium
- Species: T. suffocatum

Binomial name
- Trifolium suffocatum L.

= Trifolium suffocatum =

Species of plant

Trifolium suffocatum, the suffocated clover, is a species of annual herb in the family Fabaceae. They have a self-supporting growth form and compound, broad leaves. Individuals can grow to 4.2 cm.

== Sources ==
This article incorporates text from a free content work. Licensed under CC0 (license statement/permission). Text taken from Trifolium suffocatum. Encyclopedia of Life.
