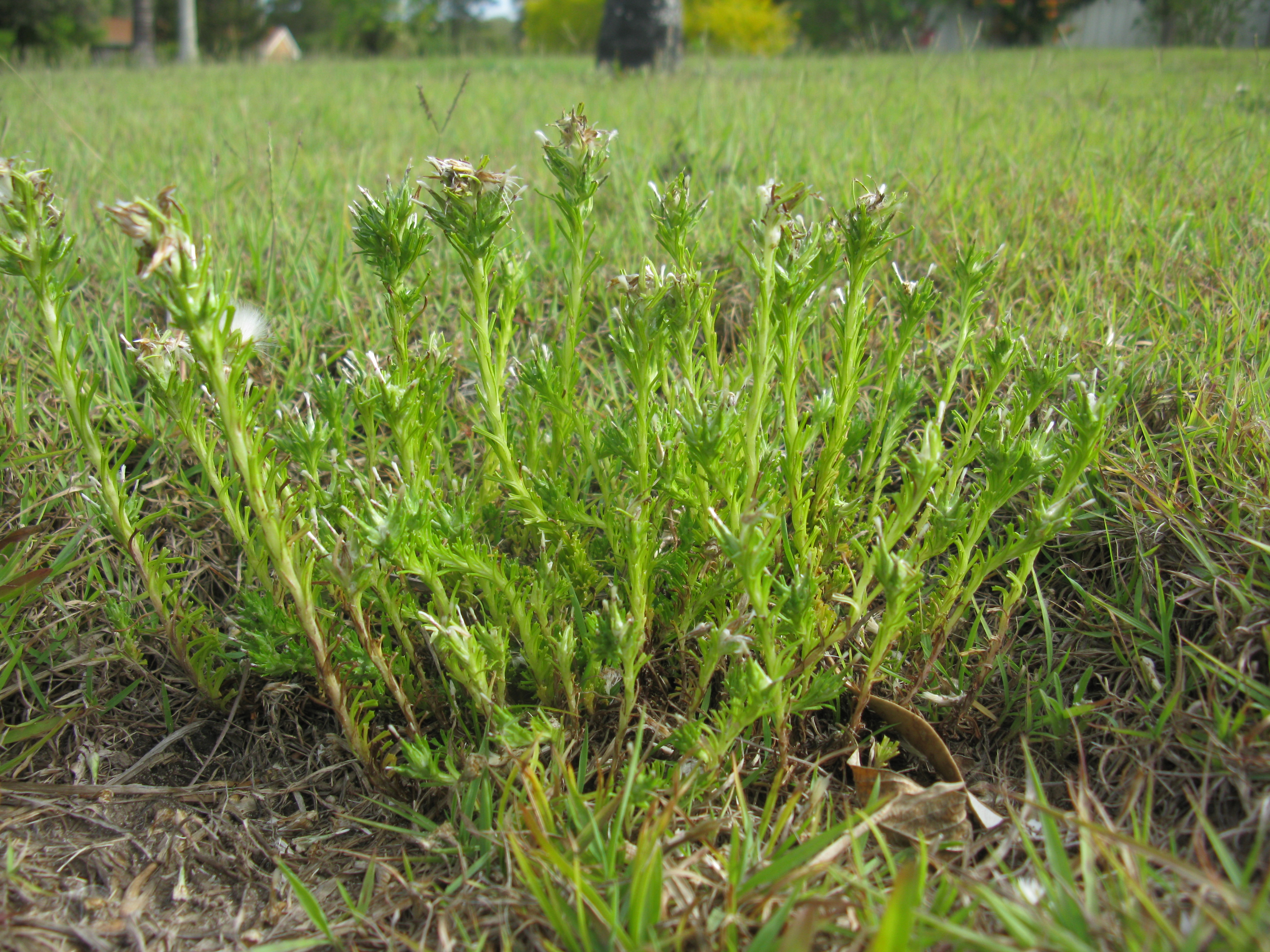

Scientific classification
- Kingdom: Plantae
- Clade: Tracheophytes
- Clade: Angiosperms
- Clade: Eudicots
- Clade: Asterids
- Order: Asterales
- Family: Asteraceae
- Genus: Facelis
- Species: F. retusa

Binomial name
- Facelis retusa (Lam.) Sch.Bip.

Synonyms
- Facelis apiculata Cass.; Gnaphalium retusum Lam. 1788; Pteropogon andicola Nees

= Facelis retusa =

Species of flowering plant

Facelis retusa, the annual trampweed, is a South American species of flowering plant in the family Asteraceae. It is native Brazil, Bolivia, Paraguay, Uruguay, northern Argentina, Chile; naturalized in parts of Africa, Australia, and North America including the southeastern and south-central United States, and considered as a noxious weed in some of those places.

Facelis retusa is an annual herb with the stems up to 30 cm (1-foot) long, very often trailing along the surface of the ground. Leaves are crowded along the stem, each up to 3 cm (1 in) long. Flower heads are in clusters, with white or purple disc flowers but no ray flowers. The achene has several long, feathery bristles that give a white appearance and assure effective seed dispersal.
