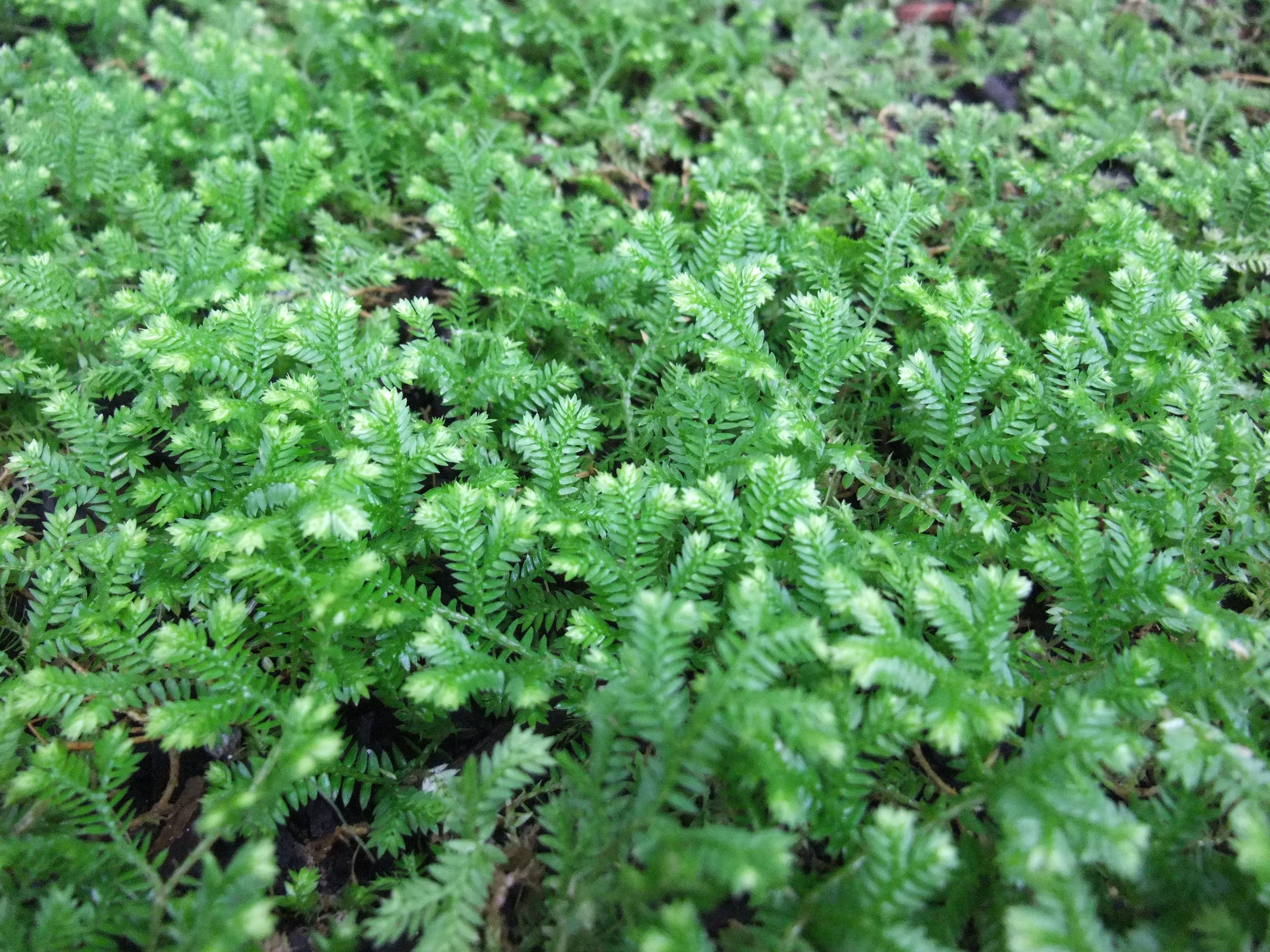

Scientific classification
- Kingdom: Plantae
- Clade: Tracheophytes
- Clade: Lycophytes
- Class: Lycopodiopsida
- Order: Selaginellales
- Family: Selaginellaceae
- Genus: Selaginella
- Species: S. kraussiana

Binomial name
- Selaginella kraussiana (Kunze) A. Braun

Synonyms
- Selaginella azorica G.Nicholson; Selaginella canescens Fée

= Selaginella kraussiana =

Species of plant in the clubmoss family

Selaginella kraussiana is a species of vascular plant in the family Selaginellaceae. It is referred to by the common names Krauss' spikemoss, Krauss's clubmoss, or African clubmoss, and is found naturally in parts of Sub-Saharan Africa and in Macaronesia. It is sometimes given the misnomer of "peacock fern", due to its lacy leaf structure, despite having no relation to actual ferns; rather, it belongs to the very ancient lineage of plants known as the clubmosses.

== Description ==
Growing to just 5 cm (2.0 in) high, it is a low-growing, mat-forming evergreen perennial with primitive fern-like leaves, that spreads via rooting stems.

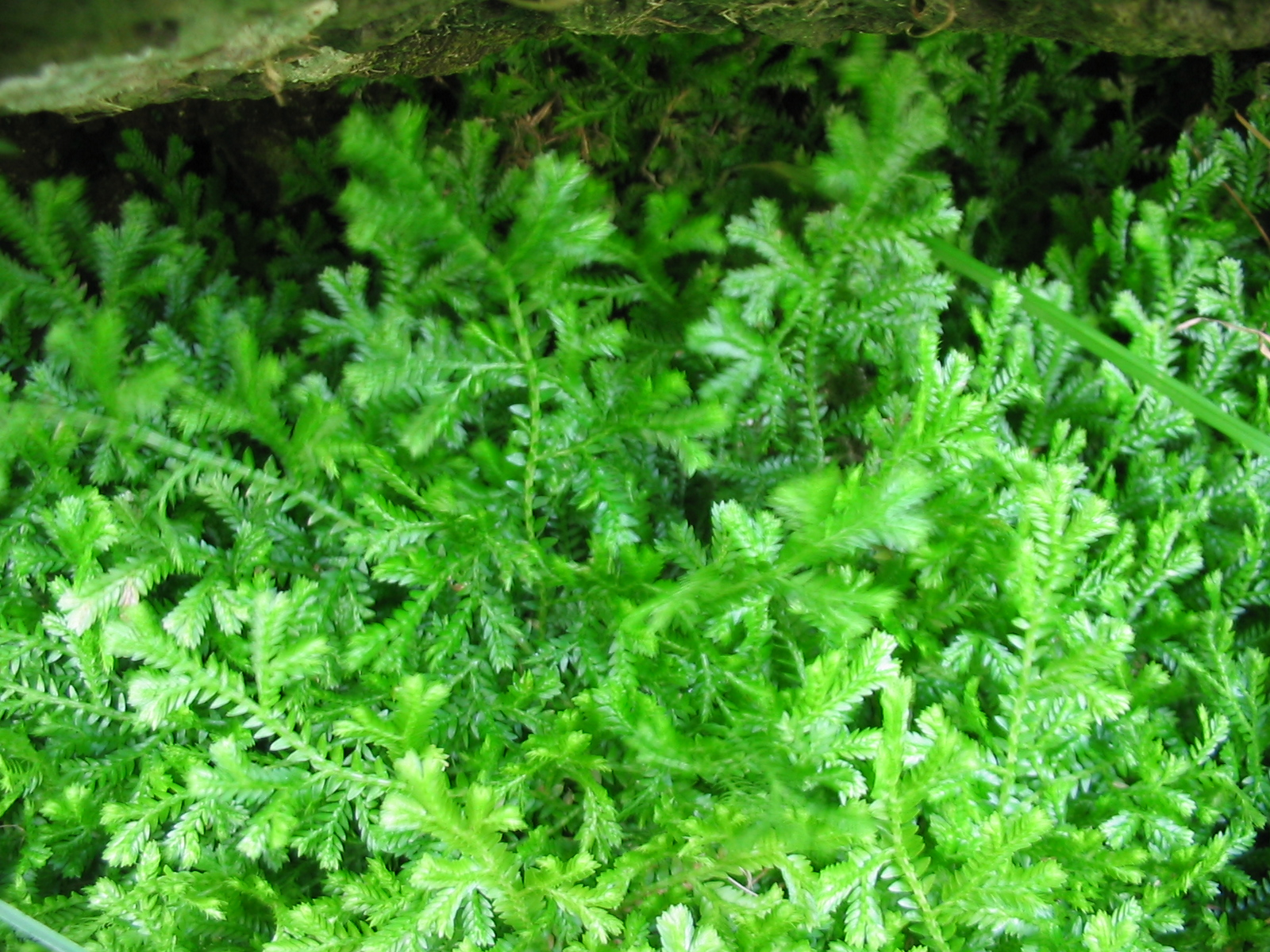
Illustrating greener coloration when grown in brighter light

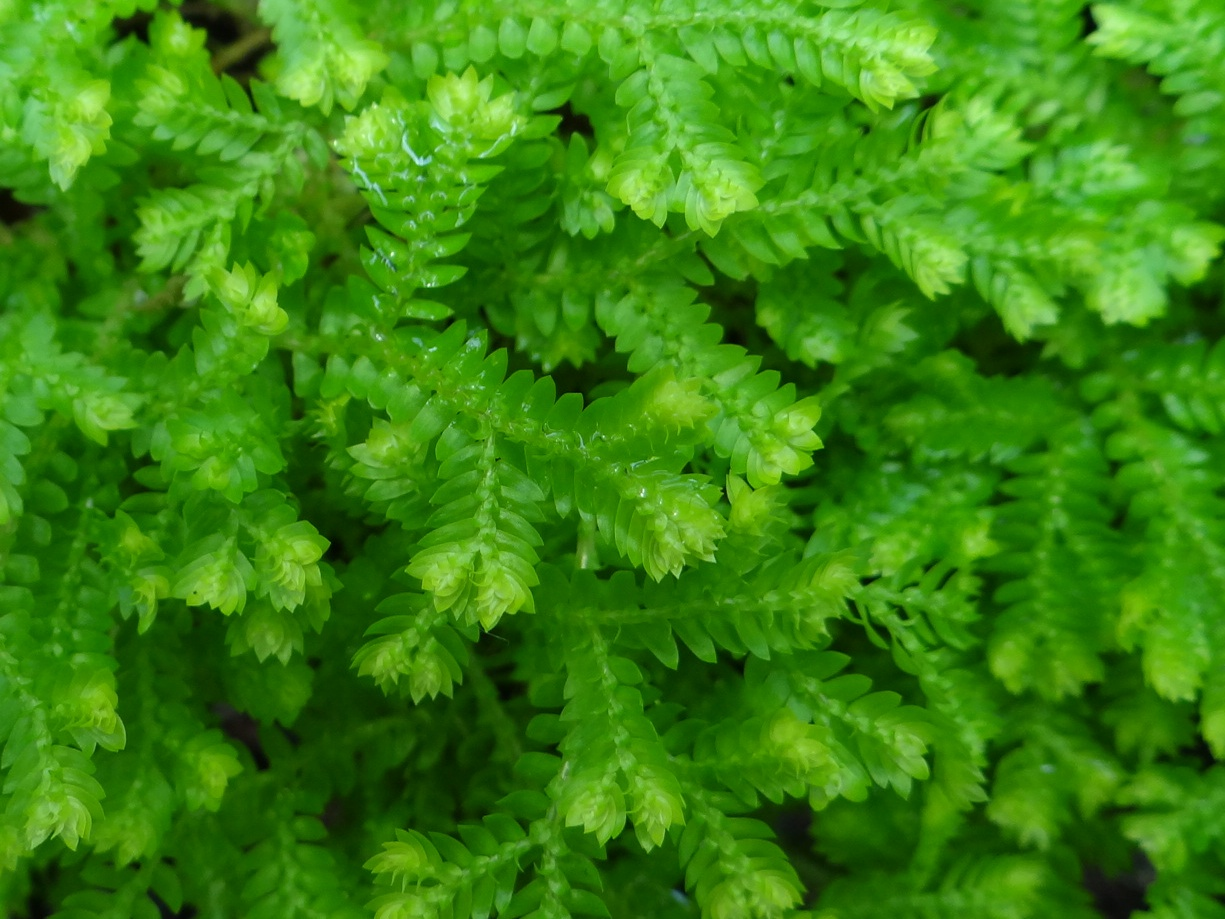
Close-up of the foliage

== Distribution ==
Its native distribution is the Macaronesia, and parts of south and east Africa. Its native distribution in the Azores was controversial up until 2005, when spores of this species were discovered in 6,000-year-old fossils on Pico. Since its introduction to Britain in 1878 it has spread slowly, and was first recorded in the wild in 1917 in west Cornwall (UK) and County Leitrim (Ireland), often as a greenhouse weed.

Selaginella kraussiana is listed on the New Zealand National Pest Plant Accord since it is an invasive species. It is common in many parts of New Zealand and Australia where it forms dense mats in shaded areas.

== Cultivation ==
Selaginella kraussiana is cultivated for ornamental purposes. It requires a minimum temperature of 5 °C (41 °F), and in temperate regions is grown under glass as a houseplant. The species and the cultivar 'Brownii' have both gained the Royal Horticultural Society's Award of Garden Merit. Other cultivars include 'Aurea' and 'Gold Tips'. They prefer a sheltered spot, in full or partial shade. They require potting media that retains humidity while not staying overly wet, and drains quickly. An acidic to neutral pH (6.0–7.0) is preferable.

In the winter, a cultivar often referred to as Selaginella kraussiana 'Frosty Fern' is sold as a house plant due to its white-tipped foliage; however, this is more often the taller-growing Selaginella martensii, not the shorter, creeping S. kraussiana.
