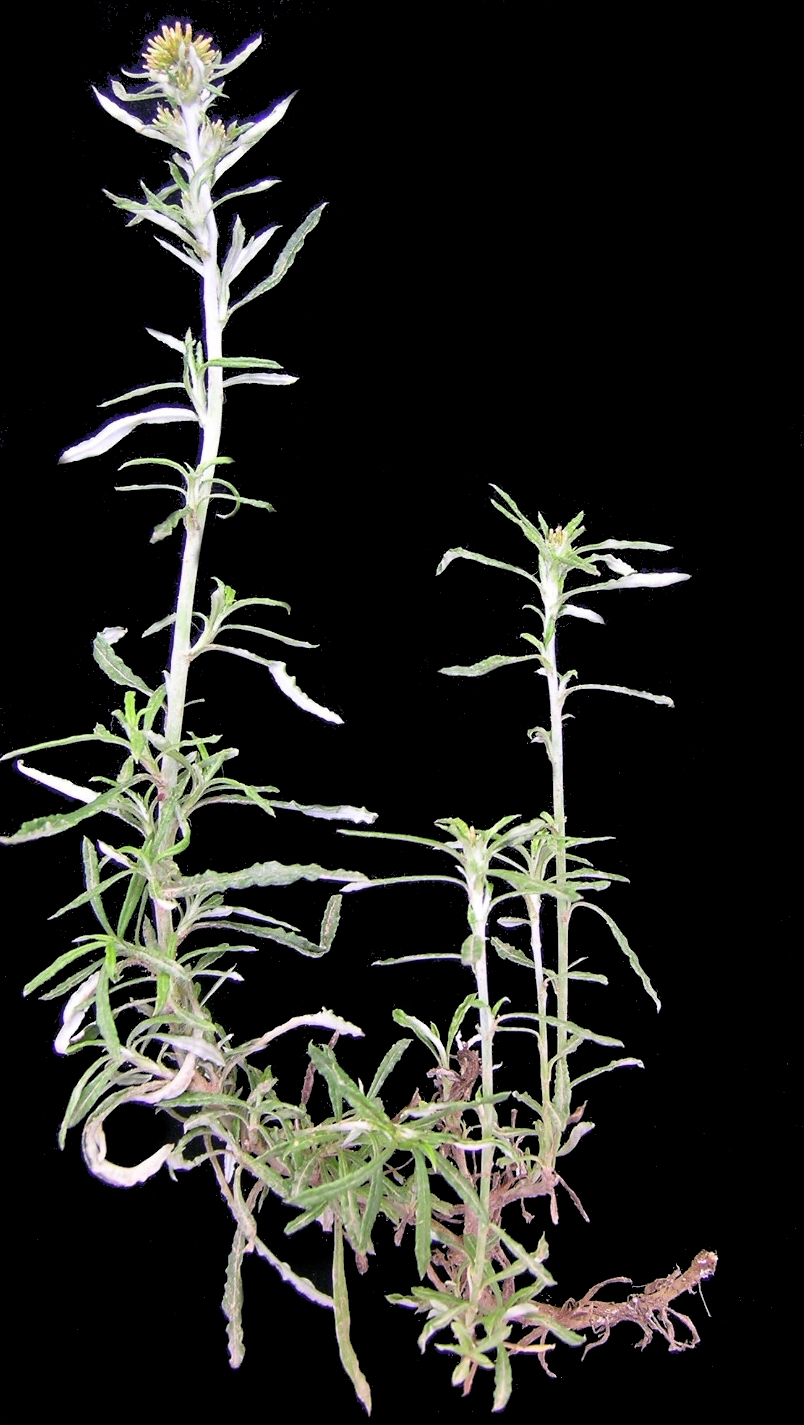

Scientific classification
- Kingdom: Plantae
- Clade: Tracheophytes
- Clade: Angiosperms
- Clade: Eudicots
- Clade: Asterids
- Order: Asterales
- Family: Asteraceae
- Genus: Euchiton
- Species: E. involucratus

Binomial name
- Euchiton involucratus (G.Forst.) Holub 1974 not (G.Forst.) Anderb. 1991

Synonyms
- Synonymy: Gnaphalium involucratum G. Forst. 1753; Euchiton involucratus (G. Forst.) Anderb. 1991; Euchiton forsteri Cass.; Euchiton pulchellus Cass.; Gnaphalium cephaloideum Willd.; Gnaphalium cunninghamii DC.; Gnaphalium globosum Hornem.; Gnaphalium globosum Desf.; Gnaphalium lanatum G.Forst.; Gnaphalium lineare Hayata 1908 not (DC.) Sch. Bip. 1845; Leontopodium javanicum Zoll. & Mor.

= Euchiton involucratus =

Species of flowering plant

Euchiton involucratus, the common cudweed, is an herb in the tribe Gnaphalieae within the family Asteraceae. It is native to Australia and New Zealand and sparingly naturalized in a few scattered locations in the United States (California + Massachusetts).

Euchiton involucratus is a biennial or perennial herb up to 40 cm (16 inches) tall, spreading by means of stolons running along the surface of the ground. Stems are usually unbranched, covered with white woolly hairs. Leaves are narrowly lance-shaped, green and shiny on the top side, white and woolly underneath. The plant produces flower heads in a hemispheric cluster at the top of the plant, frequently with smaller clusters in the axils of the leaves. Each head is cylindrical, with brown or copper-colored bracts on the outside. It has 80-150 pistillate flowers around the edge of the head plus 3-7 bisexual florets toward the center.
