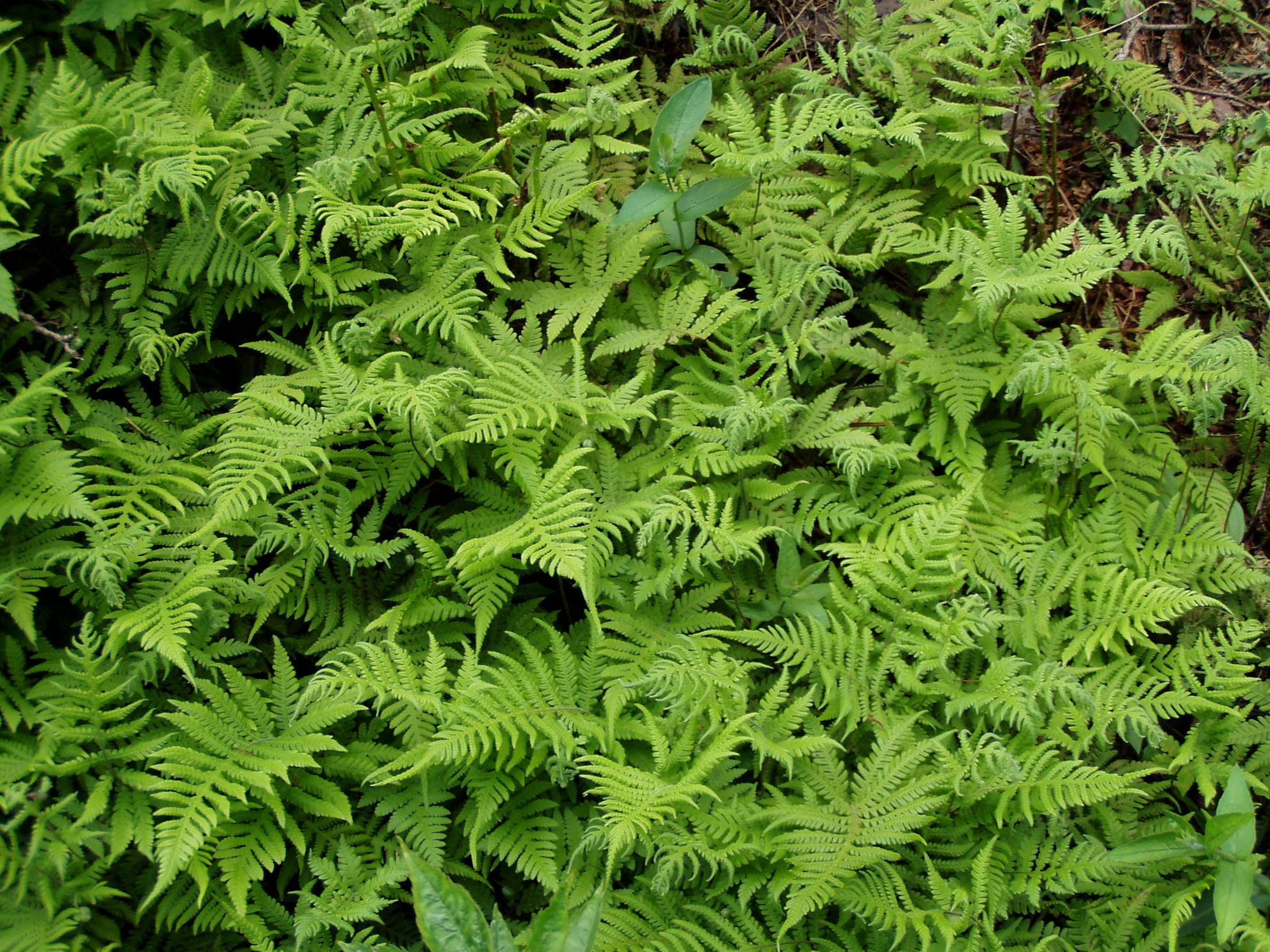

Conservation status
- Secure (NatureServe)

Scientific classification
- Kingdom: Plantae
- Clade: Tracheophytes
- Division: Polypodiophyta
- Class: Polypodiopsida
- Order: Polypodiales
- Suborder: Aspleniineae
- Family: Thelypteridaceae
- Genus: Phegopteris
- Species: P. connectilis

Binomial name
- Phegopteris connectilis (Michx.) Watt

Synonyms
- Dryopteris phegopteris (L.) C. Chr. Lastrea phegopteris (L.) Bory; Phegopteris polypodioides Fée; Thelypteris phegopteris (L.) Sloss.

= Phegopteris connectilis =

Species of fern

Phegopteris connectilis, commonly known as long beech fern, northern beech fern, and narrow beech fern, is a species of clonal fern native to forests of the Northern Hemisphere.

== Description ==
It grows to heights of 10–50 cm. This plant is pinnately lobed, perennial pteridophyte. It has a thin rootstock. The leaf-stalk is 1-2 times the length of the leaf blade and thin. The leaf blade is somewhat horizontal and triangular, pinnately compound at the base and pinnatisect from then onwards. Leaflets are narrow and pinnately lobed. Lobes are narrow and hairy underneath. The lowest pair of leaves point up diagonally. The sporangium of the plant are located on underside of the leaves.

This species is normally apogamous, with a chromosome count of n=90 (triploid; "3n"=90).

== Habitat ==
Phegopteris connectilis favors wet habitats: the sides of streams, areas with springs, coniferous swamps and eutrophic paludified hardwood-spruce forests (lehtokorpi in Finnish). Unlike its close relative, Phegopteris hexagonoptera, which is terrestrial, this species is often epipetric as well as terrestrial, able to grow at the bases of rocks and in crevices of shady, moist rock walls.

The plant demands fair nutrition from its seedbed and it does not like acidic ground. Liking shady habitats, it also does not like logging sites. It is also prone to get frostbitten in such areas.

== Chemistry ==
The phenolic compounds 2,4,6-trihydroxybenzoic acid-4-O-2′,3′,4′,6′-tetraacetylglucoside; 2,4,6-trihydroxybenzoic acid-4-O-2′,3′,6′-triacetylglucoside; 2,4,6-trihydroxybenzoic acid-4-O-3′,4′,6′-triacetylglucoside; 3-O-p-coumaroylshikimic acid; 2-(trans-1,4-dihydroxy-2-cyclohexenyl)-5-hydroxy-7-methoxychromone; kaempferol; and kaempferol-3-O-β-d-glucoside can be isolated from the methanolic extract of fronds of Phegopteris connectilis.
