= Amblovenatum opulentum =

Scientific classification
- Kingdom: Plantae
- Clade: Tracheophytes
- Division: Polypodiophyta
- Class: Polypodiopsida
- Order: Polypodiales
- Suborder: Aspleniineae
- Family: Thelypteridaceae
- Genus: Amblovenatum
- Species: A. opulentum

Binomial name
- Amblovenatum opulentum (Kaulf.) J.P.Roux

Species of plant

Amblovenatum opulentum, also known by its common name jeweled maiden fern, is a species from the genus Amblovenatum.

== Taxonomy ==
The species was originally described by Kaulfuss. It has subsequently been treated under several different combinations, including:

- Amphineuron opulentum (Kaulf.) Holttum
- Cyclosorus opulentus (Kaulf.) Nakaike
- Thelypteris opulenta (Kaulf.) Fosberg

The currently accepted name is Amblovenatum opulentum (Kaulf.) J.P.Roux.

== Distribution and habitat ==
Amblovenatum opulentum is native to tropical Africa and Asia. It has also become naturalized in the Antilles and in parts of Central and South America, including Costa Rica, Brazil, and Bolivia.

It is a terrestrial fern occurring in humid forests, secondary forests, old plantations, along trails, and in disturbed areas. In Bolivia, it was first collected in 1989 and has been recorded as an introduced species that is spreading. It occurs at elevations of up to about 650 m.

== Description ==
Amblovenatum opulentum can be distinguished from the related genera Christella and Cyclosorus by a combination of morphological characters. The proximal pinnae are not reduced, the costae lack scales on the abaxial surface, and the blades are glabrous between the veins on the adaxial surface. The abaxial surface bears sulfur-yellow, sessile glands along the veins and costules, particularly toward the tips of the segments and among the sporangia.
