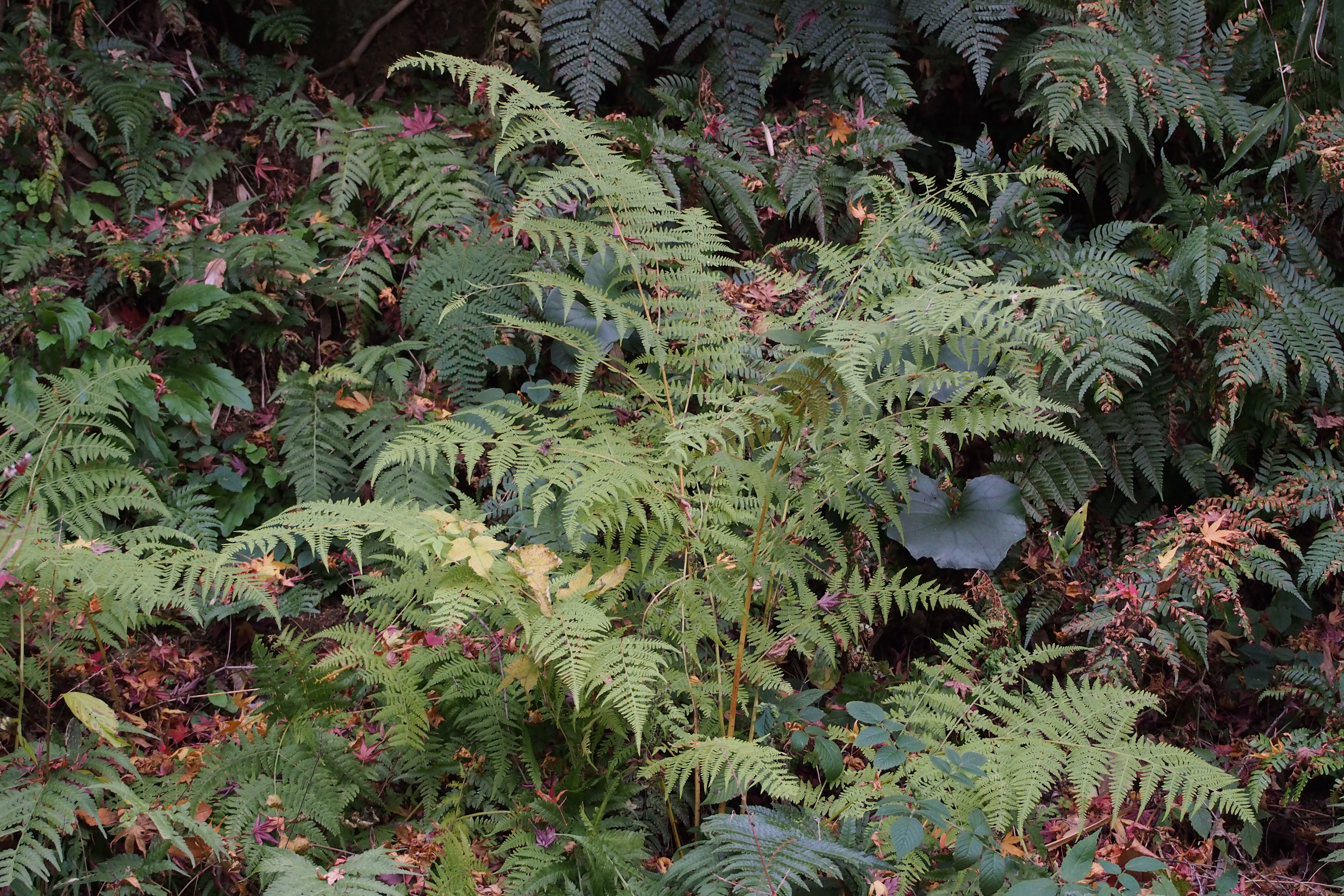
- Macrothelypteris torresiana in Kobe, Japan

Conservation status
- Apparently Secure (NatureServe)

Scientific classification
- Kingdom: Plantae
- Clade: Tracheophytes
- Division: Polypodiophyta
- Class: Polypodiopsida
- Order: Polypodiales
- Suborder: Aspleniineae
- Family: Thelypteridaceae
- Genus: Macrothelypteris
- Species: M. torresiana

Binomial name
- Macrothelypteris torresiana (Gaudich.) Ching

Synonyms
- Thelypteris torresiana (Gaudich.) Alston

= Macrothelypteris torresiana =

Species of fern

Macrothelypteris torresiana is a species of fern which is native to tropical and subtropical Africa and Asia. It has been introduced into other areas, including large parts of North and South America.

The species is assigned to different genera depending on how the family Thelypteridaceae is classified. If the entire family is classified in Thelypteris, it is Thelypteris torresiana. However, molecular data shows an affinity between a group of species which are sometimes classified in Macrothelypteris, Phegopteris, and allied genera, so it is common to remove this species from Thelypteris and classify it as Macrothelypteris torresiana.

Macrothelypteris torresiana contains flavonoids which have been investigated for possible medicinal value.
