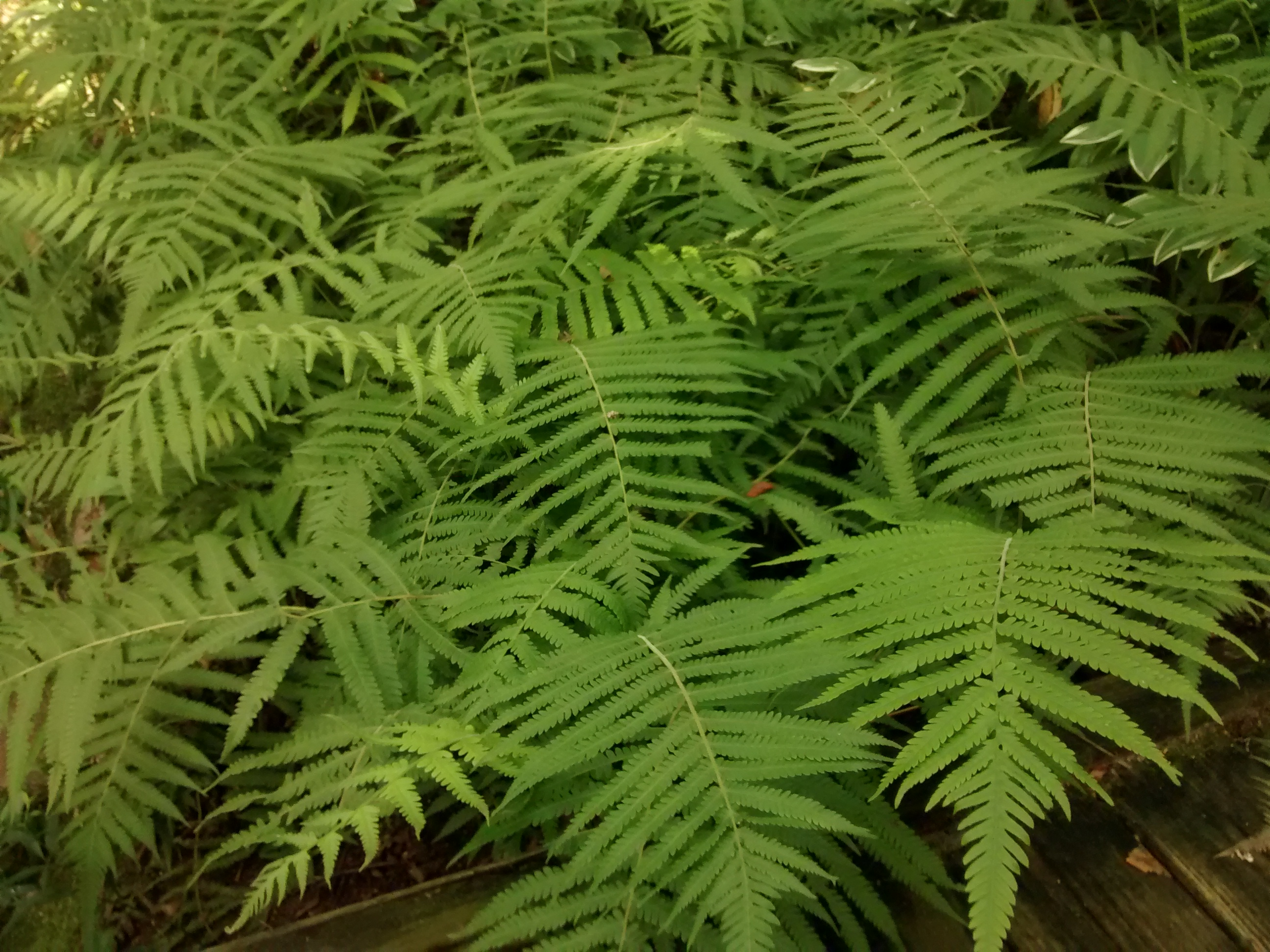

Conservation status
- Secure (NatureServe)

Scientific classification
- Kingdom: Plantae
- Clade: Tracheophytes
- Division: Polypodiophyta
- Class: Polypodiopsida
- Order: Polypodiales
- Suborder: Aspleniineae
- Family: Thelypteridaceae
- Genus: Pelazoneuron
- Species: P. kunthii

Binomial name
- Pelazoneuron kunthii (Desv.) A.R.Sm. & S.E.Fawc.

Synonyms
- Christella normalis (C.Chr.) Holttum; Cyclosorus kunthii (Desv.) Christenh.; Dryopteris normalis C.Chr.; Dryopteris saxatilis (R.P.St.John) M.Broun; Dryopteris unca (R.P.St.John) M.Broun; Filix-mas augescens var. normalis (C.Chr.) Farw.; Lastrea kunthii Moore; Lastrea normalis (C.Chr.) Copel.; Nephrodium kunthii Desv.; Nephrodium patens Jenman; Thelypteris kunthii (Desv.) C.V.Morton; Thelypteris macrorhizoma E.P.St.John; Thelypteris normalis (C.Chr.) Moxley; Thelypteris saxatilis R.P.St.John; Thelypteris unca R.P.St.John

= Pelazoneuron kunthii =

Species of fern

Pelazoneuron kunthii, synonyms Christella normalis and Thelypteris kunthii, sometimes known as Kunth's maiden fern or southern shield fern, is the most common of the maiden ferns in the southeastern United States south of the fall line. It ranges westward to eastern Texas. It usually grows in moist to dry terrestrial situations, but can also be epipetric. It often grows as a greenhouse escape in areas north of its usual range.
