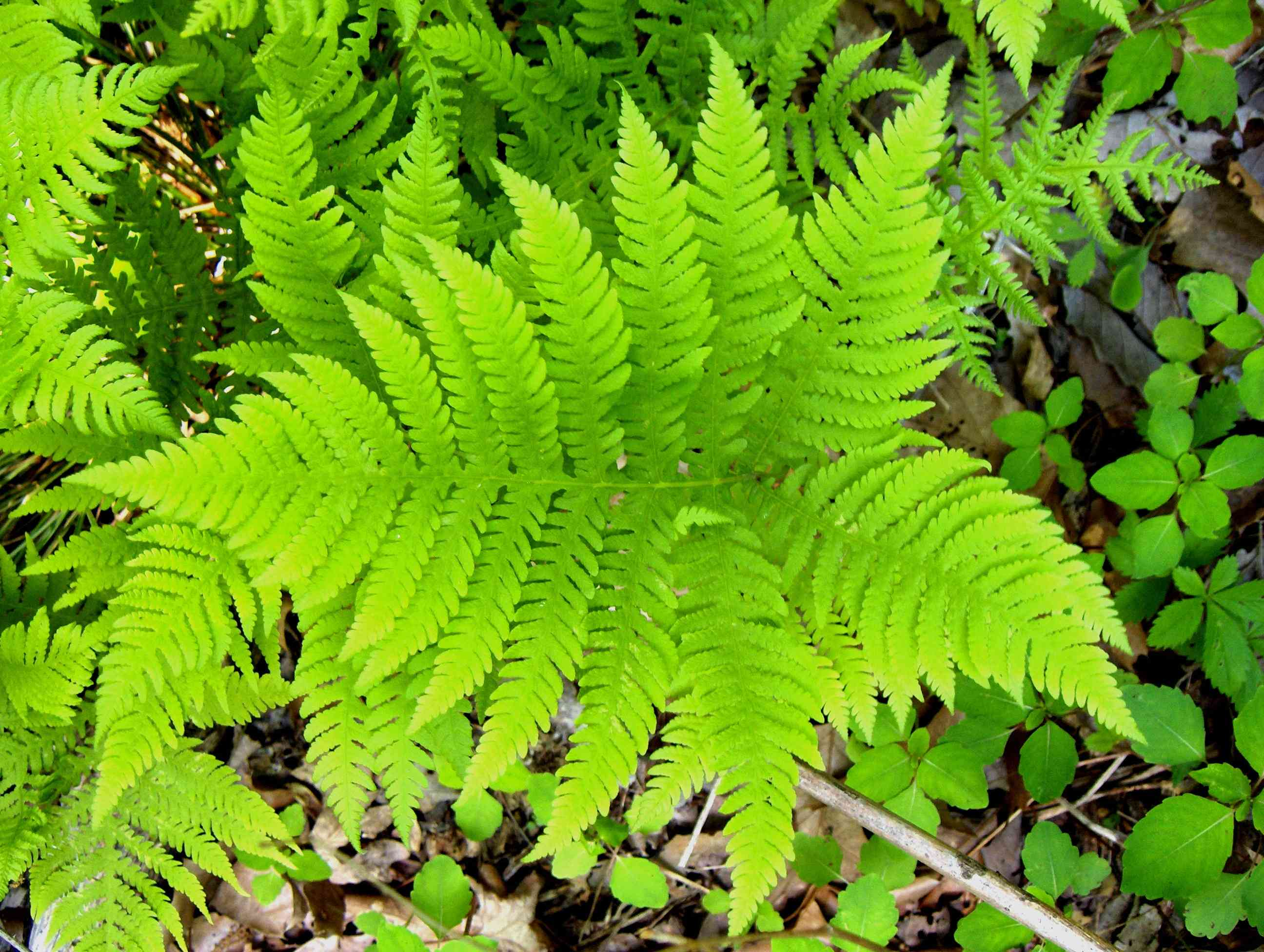
- Phegopteris hexagonoptera in spring

Scientific classification
- Kingdom: Plantae
- Clade: Tracheophytes
- Division: Polypodiophyta
- Class: Polypodiopsida
- Order: Polypodiales
- Suborder: Aspleniineae
- Family: Thelypteridaceae
- Subfamily: Phegopteridoideae
- Genus: Phegopteris (C.Presl) Fée

Species
- See text.

Synonyms
- Lastrella (H.Itô) Nakai; Thelypteris subg. Phegopteris (C.Presl) Ching

= Phegopteris =

Beech ferns

Genus of ferns

Phegopteris is a genus of ferns in the family Thelypteridaceae, subfamily Phegopteridoideae, in the Pteridophyte Phylogeny Group classification of 2016 (PPG I). They are known collectively as the beech ferns. Species are native to Asia, North America and Europe.

== Taxonomy ==
Phegopteris was first described in 1852 by Carl Borivoj Presl as an unranked taxon within the genus Polypodium. It was raised to the rank of genus by Antoine Fée in the same year.

The Pteridophyte Phylogeny Group classification of 2016 (PPG I) recognizes three genera in the subfamily Phegopteridoideae: Macrothelypteris, Phegopteris and Pseudophegopteris. As of January 2020, both the Checklist of Ferns and Lycophytes of the World and Plants of the World Online regarded Pseudophegopteris as a synonym of Phegopteris.

=== Species ===
As of October 2026, the Checklist of Ferns and Lycophytes of the World accepted the following species:

- Phegopteris connectilis (Michx.) Watt
- Phegopteris decursive-pinnata (H.C.Hall) Fée
- Phegopteris excelsior N.R.Patel & A.V.Gilman
- Phegopteris hexagonoptera (Michx.) Fée
- Phegopteris koreana B.Y.Sun & C.H.Kim
- Phegopteris taiwaniana T.Fujiw., Ogiso & Seriz.

Plants of the World Online listed further species which the Checklist of Ferns and Lycophytes of the World treats in Pseudophegopteris.
