= Soft hair =

Soft hair may refer to:

- Fur, a soft, thick coating of hair on almost all mammals
- Soft hair on black holes, a potential solution to the black hole information paradox
- Soft Hair, an album by Connan Mockasin
- Stegnogramma pilosa, a fern species sometimes called the softhairy maiden fern
