= Goniopteris verecunda =

Conservation status
- Endangered (ESA)

Scientific classification
- Kingdom: Plantae
- Clade: Tracheophytes
- Division: Polypodiophyta
- Class: Polypodiopsida
- Order: Polypodiales
- Suborder: Aspleniineae
- Family: Thelypteridaceae
- Genus: Goniopteris
- Species: G. verecunda

Binomial name
- Goniopteris verecunda (Proctor) Salino & T.E.Almeida

Synonyms
- Thelypteris verecunda Proctor

Species of fern

Goniopteris verecunda, synonym Thelypteris verecunda, is a rare species of fern known by the common name Barrio Charcas maiden fern. It is endemic to Puerto Rico, where it is known from only three localities. It is a federally listed endangered species of the United States.

This fern was first described in 1985 as Thelypteris verecunda. It was placed on the endangered species list in 1993. At that time it was known to exist at three locations in Quebradillas, Hatillo, and San Sebastián in Puerto Rico. Two of these localities have only one individual each. At Barrio Bayaney in Hatillo there are 20 plants.

This terrestrial fern has two types of fronds, sterile leaves just a few centimeters long and narrower fertile fronds up to 15 centimeters long. The blades are covered in hairs, and the sori have tufts of white hair.
