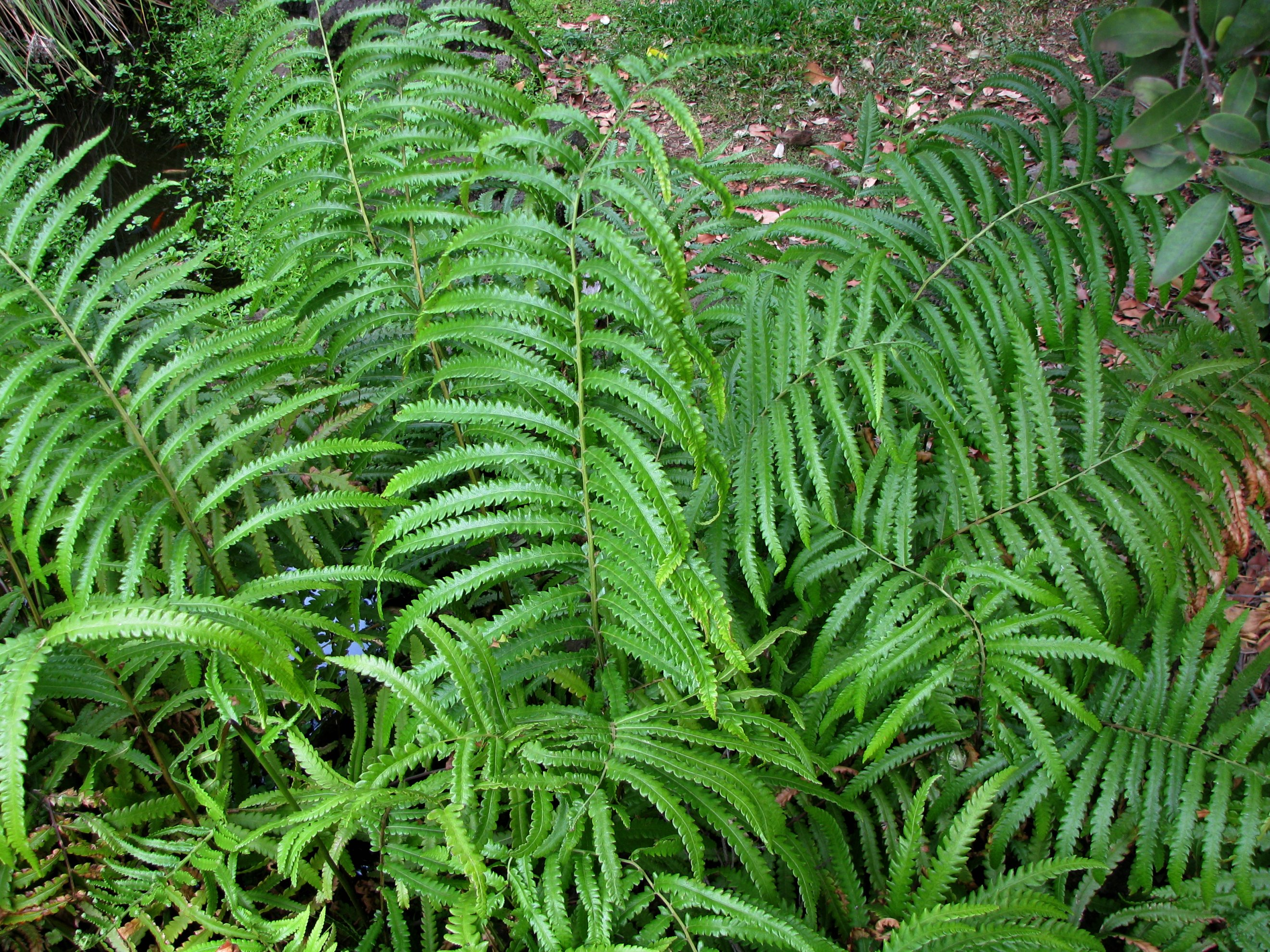

Conservation status
- Least Concern (IUCN 3.1)

Scientific classification
- Kingdom: Plantae
- Clade: Embryophytes
- Clade: Tracheophytes
- Division: Polypodiophyta
- Class: Polypodiopsida
- Order: Polypodiales
- Suborder: Aspleniineae
- Family: Thelypteridaceae
- Genus: Cyclosorus
- Species: C. interruptus

Binomial name
- Cyclosorus interruptus (Willd.) H.Itô

Synonyms
- Cyclosorus gongylodes

= Cyclosorus interruptus =

Species of fern

Cyclosorus interruptus, the Hottentot fern or swamp shield-fern, is a fern in the family Thelypteridaceae. It is native to the tropics and subtropics in many parts of the world. In the New World, it is found from Mexico to Argentina, and in the Antilles. In the Old World, it is found in India, China, Malaysia, Sri Lanka and South Africa. It is also found in Australia, New Zealand, Hawaii and other islands in the Pacific Ocean. The various populations differ with respect to genetic cytotypes, glands, pubescence, and frond size. Its habitat is the vicinity of freshwater swamps and it may reach 1 m (3 ft 3 in) in height.

== History ==
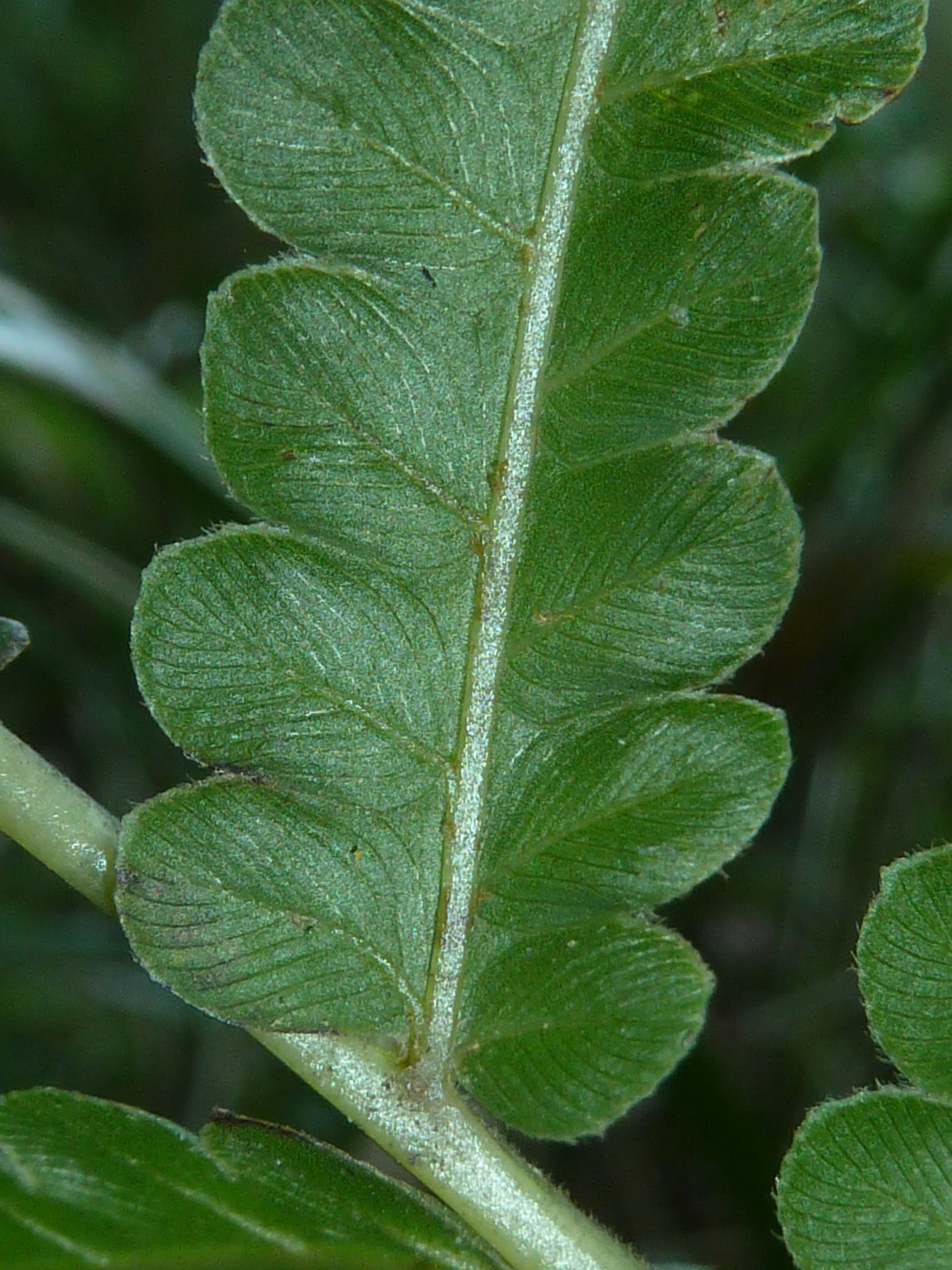
Detail of a pinna

In 1770 during the first voyage of James Cook, it was collected by Joseph Banks and Daniel Solander not far from Botany Bay. Despite urbanization, it still occurs in a park in the Sydney bayside suburb of Monterey. The specific epithet interruptus is from the Latin, and refers to the sori. The sori are in zig-zag rows or a v-shaped series along the frond margins, and are protected by a hairy, round or kidney shaped indusium.

This plant appeared first appeared in the scientific literature as Pteris interrupta in 1794, published by the German taxonomist Carl Ludwig Willdenow. In 1810, it also appeared in the Prodromus Florae Novae Hollandiae as Nephrodium propinquum, authored by the prolific Scottish botanist Robert Brown. However, this plant has undergone considerable review, name changes, and taxonomic debate.

== Cultivation ==
C. interruptus is likely to be a useful landscape plant if kept damp and in gardens free of frost. There are reports that the rhizome is edible.

== Uses as herbal medicine ==
C. interruptus is used in herbal medicine for sores, liver diseases, gonorrhea, cough, and malaria.
