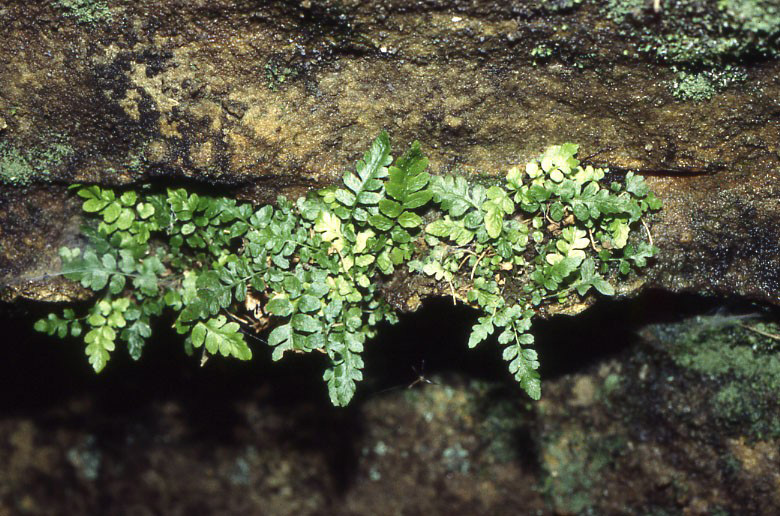

Conservation status
- Critically Imperiled (NatureServe)

Scientific classification
- Kingdom: Plantae
- Clade: Tracheophytes
- Division: Polypodiophyta
- Class: Polypodiopsida
- Order: Polypodiales
- Suborder: Aspleniineae
- Family: Thelypteridaceae
- Genus: Stegnogramma
- Species: S. burksiorum

Binomial name
- Stegnogramma burksiorum (J.E.Watkins & Farrar) Weakley

Synonyms
- Thelypteris burksiorum J.E.Watkins & Farrar; Leptogramma pilosa var. alabamensis (Crawford) Wherry; Thelypteris pilosa var. alabamensis Crawford; Stegnogramma pilosa var. alabamensis (Crawford) K.Iwats.

= Stegnogramma burksiorum =

Species of fern

Stegnogramma burksiorum, synonym Thelypteris burksiorum, the Alabama maiden fern, is a fern species in the family Thelypteridaceae. It is closely related to Stegnogramma pilosa (syn. Thelypteris pilosa) and has been treated as the variety alabamensis of that species; the two have also been treated as a species complex. Stegnogramma burksiorum is native to Alabama in the United States.
