= Menisciopsis penangiana =

Scientific classification
- Kingdom: Plantae
- Clade: Tracheophytes
- Division: Polypodiophyta
- Class: Polypodiopsida
- Order: Polypodiales
- Suborder: Aspleniineae
- Family: Thelypteridaceae
- Genus: Menisciopsis
- Species: M. penangiana

Binomial name
- Menisciopsis penangiana (Hook.) S.E.Fawc. & A.R.Sm.

Synonyms
- Abacopteris penangiana (Hook.) Ching; Apalophlebia costata (Wall. ex C.Presl) C.Presl; Aspidium porphyrophlebium Christ; Aspidium rampans (Baker) Christ; Christella porphyrophlebia (Christ) H.Lév.; Cyclosorus penangianus (Hook.) Copel.; Cyclosorus penangianus (Hook.) Panigrahi; Dryopteris penangiana (Hook.) C.Chr.; Dryopteris porphyrophlebia (Christ) C.Chr.; Dryopteris pseudocuspidata Christ; Dryopteris rampans (Baker) C.Chr.; Dryopteris subcuspidata Rosenst.; Goniopteris costata (Wall. ex C.Presl) J.Sm.; Goniopteris lineata (Colebr. ex Wall.) C.Presl; Goniopteris penangiana (Hook.) Bedd.; Meniscium urophyllum (Wall. ex Hook.) H.Itô, Nakai & Honda; Nephrodium costatum Bedd.; Nephrodium rampans Baker; Phegopteris lineata (Colebr. ex Wall.) Mett. ex Salomon; Polypodium costatum (Wall. ex C.Presl) Mett.; Polypodium costatum Wall.; Polypodium lineatum Colebr. ex Wall.; Polypodium lineatum var. penangianum (Hook.) C.B.Clarke; Polypodium penangianum Hook.; Polypodium urophyllum Wall.; Polypodium urophyllum Wall. ex Hook.; Pronephrium kumaonicum P.C.Pande & H.C.Pande; Pronephrium kumaunicum P.C.Pande & H.C.Pande; Pronephrium penangianum (Hook.) Holttum; Pronephrium penangianum (Hook.) P.Chandra; Thelypteris pandeorum Christenh.; Thelypteris penangiana (Hook.) C.F.Reed; Thelypteris porphyrophlebia (Christ) C.F.Reed; Thelypteris rampans (Baker) C.F.Reed

Species of fern

Menisciopsis penangiana is a fern species in the genus Menisciopsis. It has many synonyms, including Abacopteris penangiana and Pronephrium penangianum.

Flavan-4-ols glycosides, abacopterins A, B, C and D together with triphyllin A and 6,8-dimethyl-7-hydroxy-4‘-methoxyanthocyanidin-5-O-β-d-glucopyranoside, can be isolated from a methanol extract of the rhizomes of M. penangiana.
