= Stegnogramma griffithii =

Scientific classification
- Kingdom: Plantae
- Clade: Tracheophytes
- Division: Polypodiophyta
- Class: Polypodiopsida
- Order: Polypodiales
- Suborder: Aspleniineae
- Family: Thelypteridaceae
- Genus: Stegnogramma
- Species: S. griffithii

Binomial name
- Stegnogramma griffithii (T.Moore) K.Iwats.

Species of plant

Stegnogramma griffithii is a species of fern in the family Thelypteridaceae. It is found in parts of Southern China, Myanmar, Vietnam, Nepal, Bhutan, Taiwan, and Meghalaya. It was first described by Thomas Moore. S. griffithii is considered endangered in India by the IUCN.
