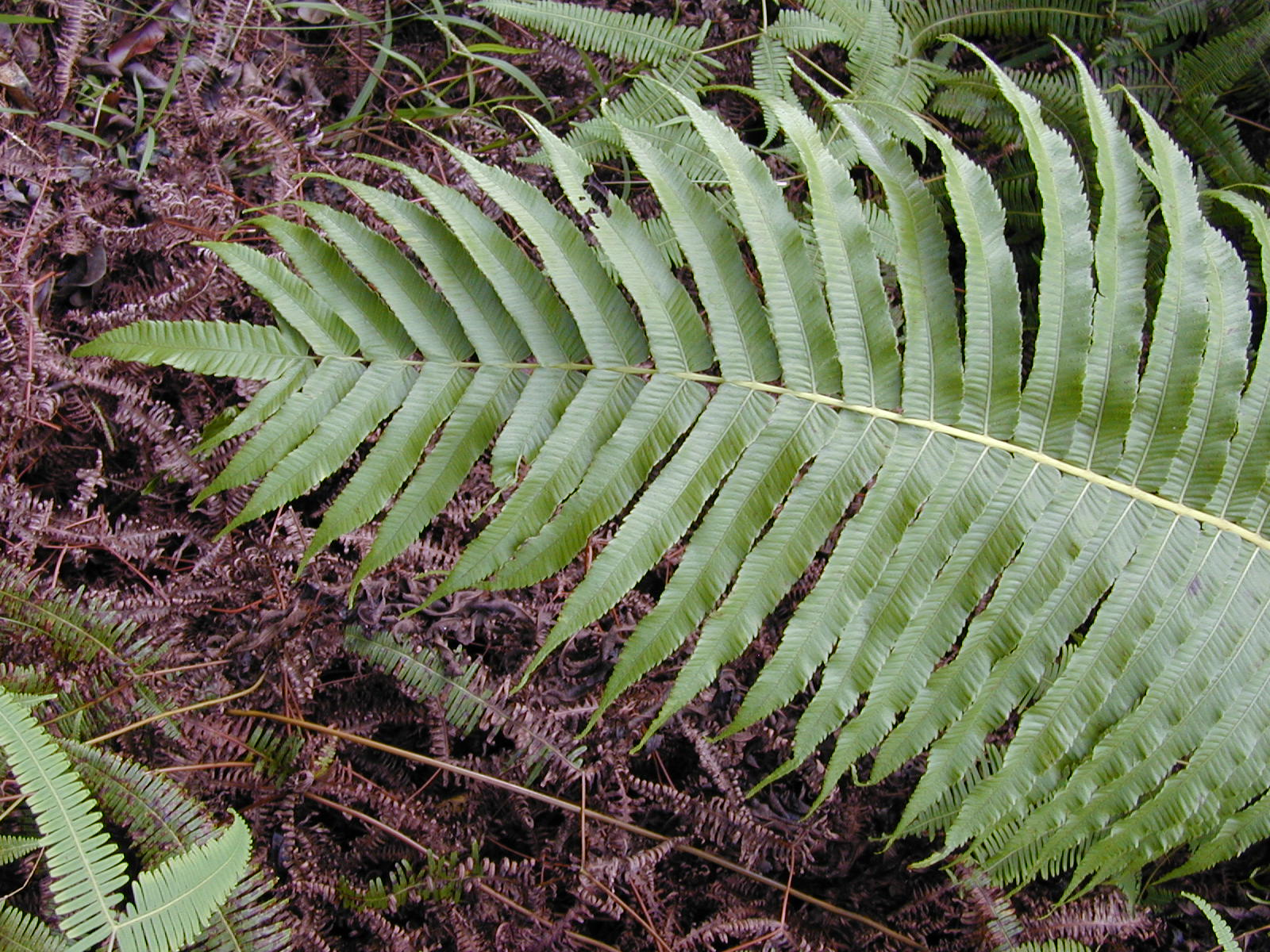
- Maui, Hawaii

Scientific classification
- Kingdom: Plantae
- Clade: Tracheophytes
- Division: Polypodiophyta
- Class: Polypodiopsida
- Order: Polypodiales
- Suborder: Aspleniineae
- Family: Thelypteridaceae
- Genus: Menisciopsis
- Species: M. cyatheoides

Binomial name
- Menisciopsis cyatheoides (Kaulf.) S.E.Fawc. & A.R.Sm.

Synonyms
- List: Aspidium cyatheoides Kaulf.; Christella cyatheoides (Kaulf.) Holttum; Christella exindusiata (W.H.Wagner) Nakaike & Kawab.; Cyclosorus cyatheoides (Kaulf.) Farw.; Cyclosorus exindusiatus (W.H.Wagner) W.H.Wagner; Dryopteris cyatheoides (Kaulf.) Kuntze; Nephrodium cyatheoides C.Presl; Nephrodium dubreuillianum (Gaudich.) Hook. & Arn.; Nephrodium dubrueillianum (Gaudich.) Hook. & Arn.; Polystichum dubreuillianum Gaudich.; Polystichum dubrueillianum Gaudich.; Thelypteris cyatheoides (Kaulf.) Fosberg; Thelypteris exindusiata W.H.Wagner

= Menisciopsis cyatheoides =

Species of fern

Menisciopsis cyatheoides is a species of fern found in the Hawaiian Islands.
