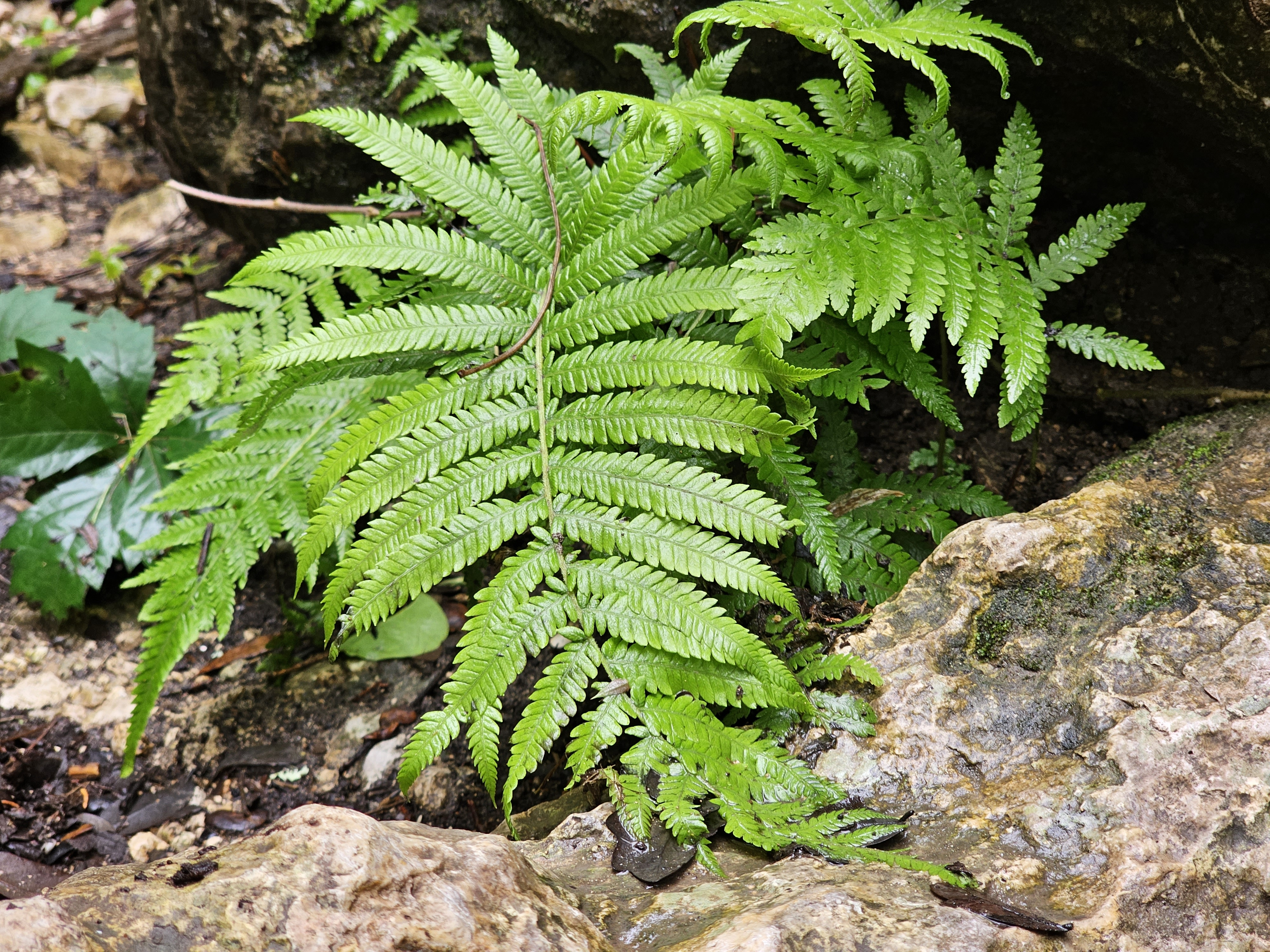
- Thelypteris ovata var. lindheimeri

Conservation status
- Apparently Secure (NatureServe)

Scientific classification
- Kingdom: Plantae
- Clade: Tracheophytes
- Division: Polypodiophyta
- Class: Polypodiopsida
- Order: Polypodiales
- Suborder: Aspleniineae
- Family: Thelypteridaceae
- Genus: Pelazoneuron
- Species: P. ovatum

Binomial name
- Pelazoneuron ovatum (R.P.St.John) A.R.Sm. & S.E.Fawc.

= Pelazoneuron ovatum =

Species of fern

Pelazoneuron ovatum, synonym Thelypteris ovata, the ovate marsh fern or ovate maiden fern, is a species of fern in the Thelypteridaceae family. Native to the southeastern United States, this fern can be found in riverbanks and moist canyons. In Georgia it can be found in the Coastal Plain.

== Subtaxa ==
The following varieties are accepted:

- Pelazoneuron ovatum var. lindheimeri, native to Texas
- Pelazoneuron ovatum var. ovatum
