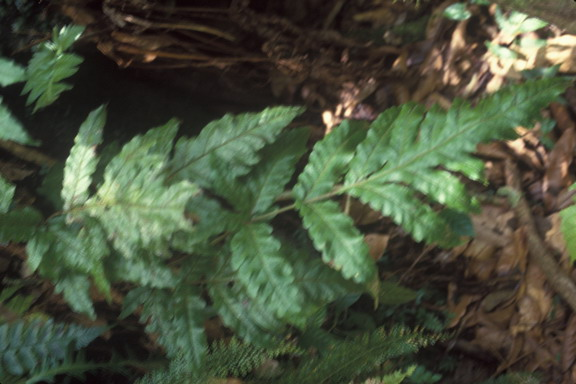

Conservation status
- Endangered (ESA)

Scientific classification
- Kingdom: Plantae
- Clade: Tracheophytes
- Division: Polypodiophyta
- Class: Polypodiopsida
- Order: Polypodiales
- Suborder: Aspleniineae
- Family: Thelypteridaceae
- Genus: Goniopteris
- Species: G. yaucoensis

Binomial name
- Goniopteris yaucoensis (Proctor) Salino & T.E.Almeida

Synonyms
- Thelypteris yaucoensis Proctor

= Goniopteris yaucoensis =

Species of fern

Goniopteris yaucoensis, synonym Thelypteris yaucoensis, is a rare species of fern known by the common name Puerto Rico maiden fern. It is endemic to Puerto Rico, where it is known from only three localities. It is a federally listed endangered species of the United States.

This fern was placed on the endangered species list in 1993. At that time it was known to exist at three locations: two in Yauco and one in Ciales in Puerto Rico. There were a total of about 65 plants known at all three combined.

This terrestrial fern has fronds up to 52 centimeters long with the blades divided into 13 to 15 pairs of segments.
