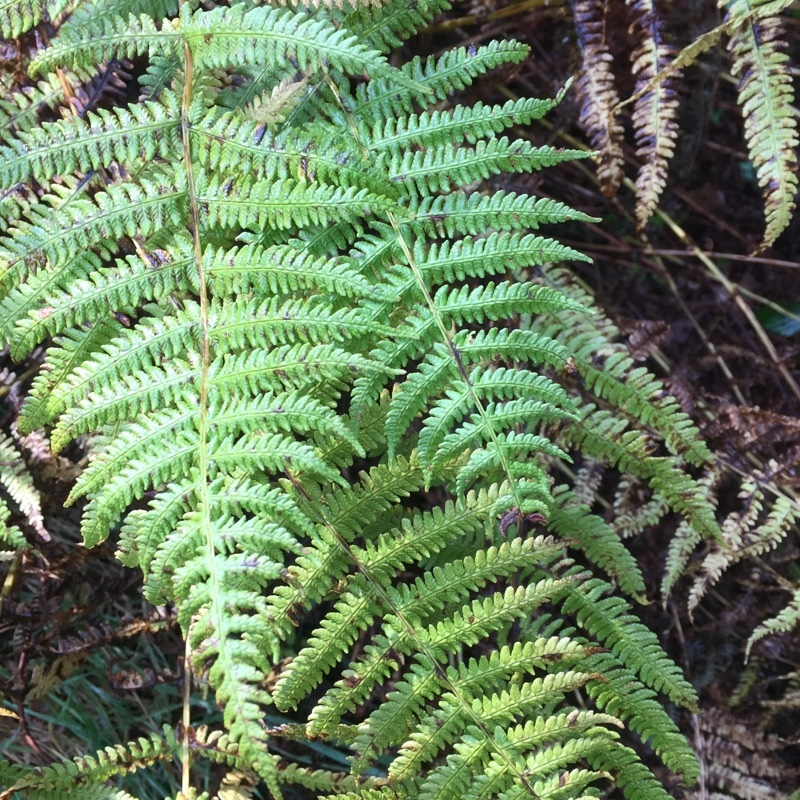
- Oreopteris limbosperma

Scientific classification
- Kingdom: Plantae
- Clade: Tracheophytes
- Division: Polypodiophyta
- Class: Polypodiopsida
- Order: Polypodiales
- Suborder: Aspleniineae
- Family: Thelypteridaceae
- Subfamily: Thelypteridoideae
- Genus: Oreopteris; Holub

= Oreopteris =

Genus of ferns

Oreopteris is a genus of ferns belonging to the family Thelypteridaceae.

The species of this genus are found in Eurasia and North America.

Species:

- Oreopteris elwesii (Baker ex Hook. & Baker) Holttum
- Oreopteris limbosperma (All.) Holub
- Oreopteris quelpartensis (Christ) Holub
