= Cyclogramma =

Scientific classification
- Kingdom: Plantae
- Clade: Tracheophytes
- Division: Polypodiophyta
- Class: Polypodiopsida
- Order: Polypodiales
- Suborder: Aspleniineae
- Family: Thelypteridaceae
- Subfamily: Thelypteridoideae
- Genus: Cyclogramma; Tagawa

Type species
- Cyclogramma simulans (Ching) Tagawa

Species
- See text.

Genus of ferns

Cyclogramma is a genus of ferns in the family Thelypteridaceae, subfamily Thelypteridoideae, in the Pteridophyte Phylogeny Group classification of 2016 (PPG I). Other sources sink Cyclogramma into a very broadly defined genus Thelypteris.

== Species ==
As of October 2026, the Checklist of Ferns and Lycophytes of the World accepted the following species:

- Cyclogramma auriculata (J.Sm.) Ching
- Cyclogramma chunii (Ching) Tagawa
- Cyclogramma costularisora Ching ex K.H.Shing
- Cyclogramma flexilis (Christ) Tagawa
- Cyclogramma leveillei (Christ) Ching
- Cyclogramma maguanensis Ching ex K.H.Shing
- Cyclogramma neoauriculata (Ching) Tagawa
- Cyclogramma omeiensis (Baker) Tagawa
- Cyclogramma squamaestipes (C.B.Clarke) Tagawa
