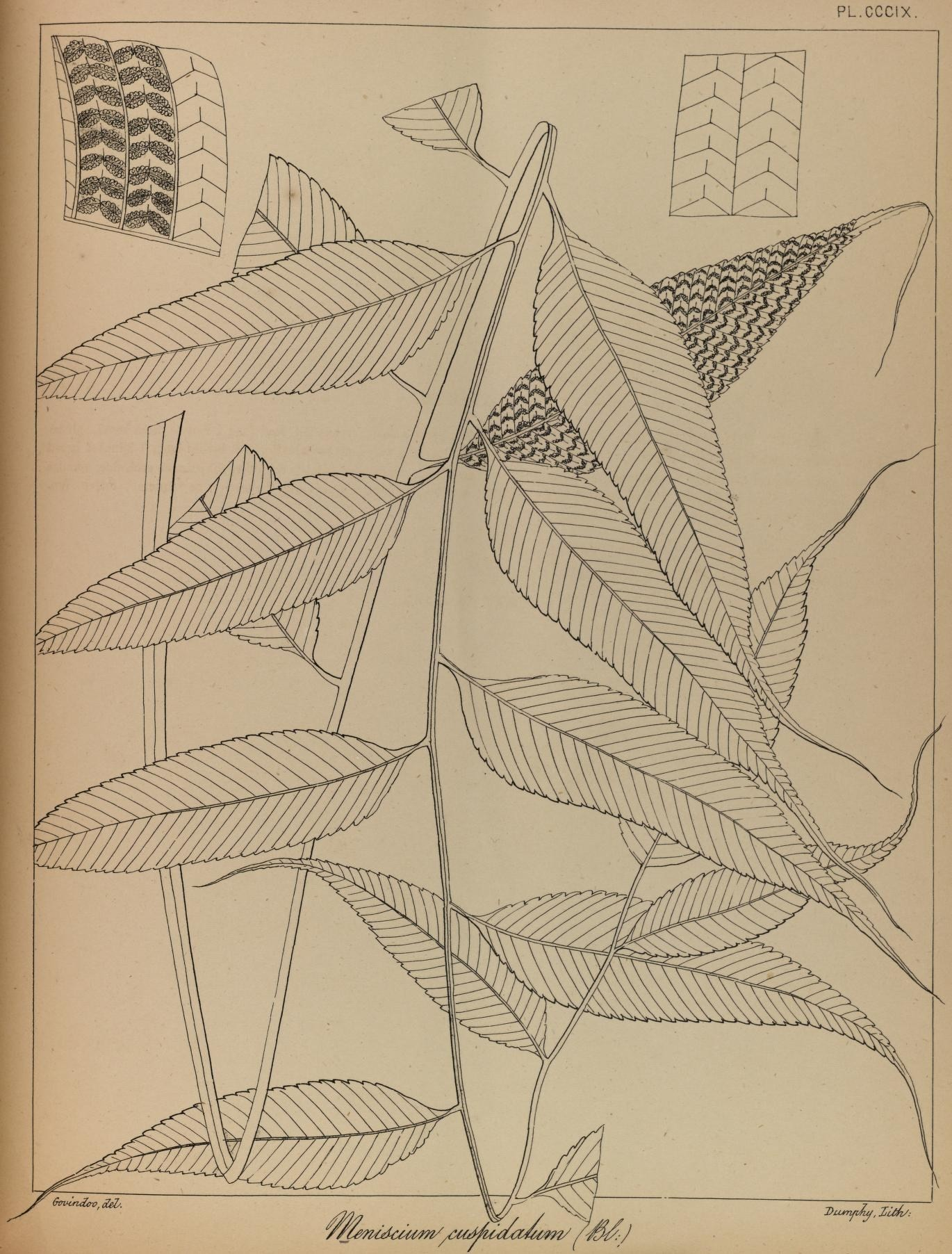
- Illustration of Grypothrix cuspidata (as Meniscium cuspidatum)

Scientific classification
- Kingdom: Plantae
- Clade: Tracheophytes
- Division: Polypodiophyta
- Class: Polypodiopsida
- Order: Polypodiales
- Suborder: Aspleniineae
- Family: Thelypteridaceae
- Genus: Grypothrix (Holttum) S.E.Fawc. & A.R.Sm.

Species
- See text.

= Grypothrix =

Genus of ferns

Grypothrix is a small genus of ferns in the family Thelypteridaceae.

== Taxonomy ==
Grypothrix was previously sunk into Pronephrium but was restored as a full genus as a result of a phylogenetic study of the family Thelypteridaceae.

=== Species ===
As of June 2022, World Ferns accepted the following species:

- Grypothrix acanthocarpum (Copel.) comb.ined.
- Grypothrix crenulata (Holttum) S.E.Fawc. & A.R.Sm.
- Grypothrix cuspidata (Blume) S.E.Fawc. & A.R.Sm.
- Grypothrix longipetiolata (K.Iwats.) S.E.Fawc. & A.R.Sm.
- Grypothrix megacuspis (Baker) S.E.Fawc. & A.R.Sm.
- Grypothrix parishii (Bedd.) S.E.Fawc. & A.R.Sm.
- Grypothrix pentapinnata (Fraser-Jenk.) S.E.Fawc. & A.R.Sm.
- Grypothrix ramosii (Christ) S.E.Fawc. & A.R.Sm.
- Grypothrix rubicunda (Alderw.) S.E.Fawc. & A.R.Sm.
- Grypothrix salicifolia (Wall. ex Hook.) S.E.Fawc. & A.R.Sm.
- Grypothrix simplex (Hook.) S.E.Fawc. & A.R.Sm.
- Grypothrix sulawesiensis (K.Iwats.) S.E.Fawc. & A.R.Sm.
- Grypothrix triphylla (Sw.) S.E.Fawc. & A.R.Sm.

Hybrid

- Grypothrix × pseudoliukiuensis (Seriz.) comb.ined.
