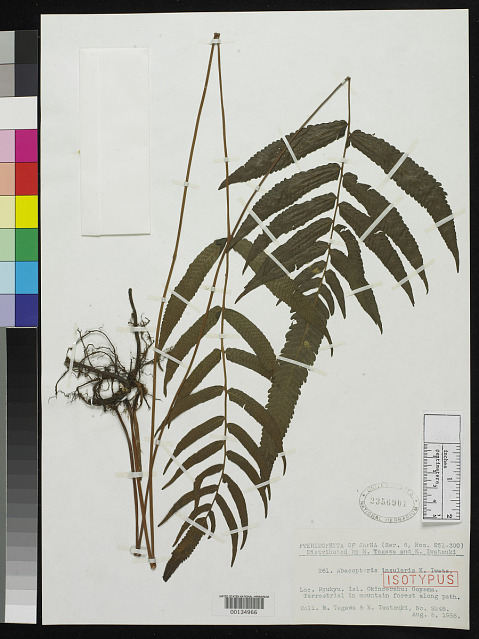
- A.insularis

Scientific classification
- Kingdom: Plantae
- Clade: Tracheophytes
- Division: Polypodiophyta
- Class: Polypodiopsida
- Order: Polypodiales
- Suborder: Aspleniineae
- Family: Thelypteridaceae
- Genus: Abacopteris; Fée

Species
- See text.

Synonyms
- Dryopteris sect. Abacopteris C.Chr.; Thelypteris subgen. Abacopteris K.Iwats.; Cyclosorus subgen. Abacopteris (Fée) Panigrahi

= Abacopteris =

Genus of ferns

Abacopteris is a small genus of ferns in the family Thelypteridaceae.

== Description ==
Abacopteris is a genus of medium- to large-sized ferns. Species in the genus usually have long-creeping rhizomes, with brown linear-lanceolate scales that extend onto the base of the stipe (stalk of the leaf).

Fronds are pinnately divided, and fertile and sterile fronds are similar in appearance. The stipes are straw-colored, brown, or reddish.

Leaf blades are green in color and thin to leathery in texture. The terminal pinna at the apex of the blade is similar in appearance to the lateral pinnae. The pinnae are not significantly smaller towards the base of the leaf. They may be entire (without teeth or lobes), crenate, or in one species, shallowly lobed.

== Taxonomy ==
Abacopteris was previously sunk into Pronephrium but was restored as a full genus as a result of a phylogenetic study of the family Thelypteridaceae.

=== Species ===
As of October 2026, World Ferns accepted the following fourteen species:

- Abacopteris afra (Christ) comb.ined.
- Abacopteris aspera (C.Presl) Ching
- Abacopteris birii (R.D.Dixit & Balkr.) S.E.Fawc. & A.R.Sm.
- Abacopteris gardneri (Holttum) S.E.Fawc. & A.R.Sm.
- Abacopteris gracilis (Ching ex Y.X.Lin) S.E.Fawc. & A.R.Sm.
- Abacopteris gymnopteridifrons (Hayata) Ching
- Abacopteris hirtisora (C.Chr.) S.E.Fawc. & A.R.Sm.
- Abacopteris macrophylla (Ching ex Y.X.Lin) S.E.Fawc. & A.R.Sm.
- Abacopteris nitida (Holttum) S.E.Fawc. & A.R.Sm.
- Abacopteris nudata (Roxb.) S.E.Fawc. & A.R.Sm.
- Abacopteris peltochlamys (C.Chr.) Holttum
- Abacopteris repanda (Fee) S.E.Fawc. & A.R.Sm.
- Abacopteris setosa (Ching ex Y.X.Lin) S.E.Fawc. & A.R.Sm.
- Abacopteris yunguiensis (Ching ex Y.X.Lin) S.E.Fawc. & A.R.Sm.
