= Pseudophegopteris =

Scientific classification
- Kingdom: Plantae
- Clade: Tracheophytes
- Division: Polypodiophyta
- Class: Polypodiopsida
- Order: Polypodiales
- Suborder: Aspleniineae
- Family: Thelypteridaceae
- Subfamily: Phegopteridoideae
- Genus: Pseudophegopteris; Ching

Species
- See text.

Synonyms
- Toppingia O.Deg., I.Deg. & A.R.Sm.

Genus of ferns

Psuedohegopteris is a genus of ferns in the family Thelypteridaceae, subfamily Phegopteridoideae, in the Pteridophyte Phylogeny Group classification of 2016 (PPG I). Species are native to tropical Africa, Asia, Malesia, and the Pacific islands.

== Taxonomy ==
Pseudophegopteris was first described in 1963 by Ren-Chang Ching.

The Pteridophyte Phylogeny Group classification of 2016 (PPG I) recognizes three genera in the subfamily Phegopteridoideae: Macrothelypteris, Phegopteris and Pseudophegopteris. As of June 2025, it is accepted by the Checklist of Ferns and Lycophytes of the World, while Plants of the World Online regards Pseudophegopteris as a synonym of Phegopteris.

=== Species ===
As of October 2026, the Checklist of Ferns and Lycophytes of the World accepted the following twenty-four species:

- Pseudophegopteris andringitrensis Rakotondr.
- Pseudophegopteris aubertii (Desv.) Holttum
- Pseudophegopteris aurita (Hook.) Ching
- Pseudophegopteris cruciata (Willd.) Holttum
- Pseudophegopteris cyclocarpa (Holttum) Holttum
- Pseudophegopteris dianae (Hook.) Holttum
- Pseudophegopteris fijiensis K.U.Kramer & E.Zogg
- Pseudophegopteris henriquesii (Baker) Holttum
- Pseudophegopteris hirtirachis (C.Chr.) Holttum
- Pseudophegopteris keraudreniana (Gaudich.) Holttum
- Pseudophegopteris kinabaluensis Holttum
- Pseudophegopteris levingei (C.B.Clarke) Ching
- Pseudophegopteris microstegia (Hook.) Ching
- Pseudophegopteris paludosa (Blume) Ching
- Pseudophegopteris persimilis (Baker) Holttum
- Pseudophegopteris pyrrhorachis (Kunze) Ching
- Pseudophegopteris rammelooi (Pic.Serm.) A.R.Sm. & S.E.Fawc.
- Pseudophegopteris rectangularis (Zoll.) Holttum
- Pseudophegopteris subaurita (Tagawa) Ching
- Pseudophegopteris sumatrana Holttum
- Pseudophegopteris tenggerensis Holttum
- Pseudophegopteris tibetana (Ching & S.K.Wu) Christenh., tentatively accepted, possibly a synonym of Pseudophegopteris aurita
- Pseudophegopteris yigongensis (Ching) Christenh., tentatively accepted, possibly a synonym of Pseudophegopteris levingei
- Pseudophegopteris zayuensis (Ching & S.K.Wu) Christenh., tentatively accepted, possibly a synonym of Pseudophegopteris aurita

One hybrid has also been described:

- Pseudophegopteris × kashmiriana (Fraser-Jenk.) Mazumdar
