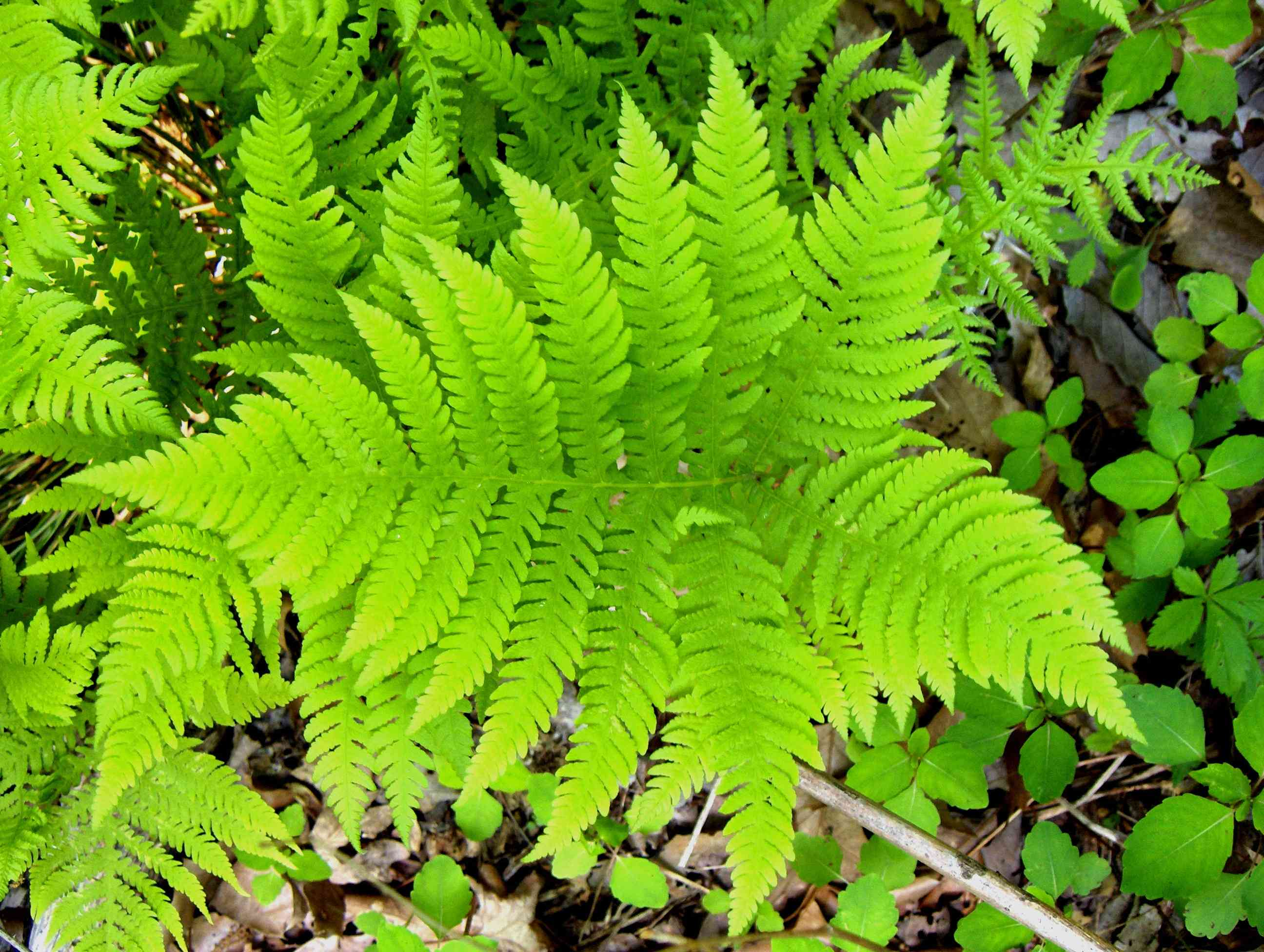
- Phegopteris hexagonoptera in spring

Conservation status
- Secure (NatureServe)

Scientific classification
- Kingdom: Plantae
- Clade: Tracheophytes
- Division: Polypodiophyta
- Class: Polypodiopsida
- Order: Polypodiales
- Suborder: Aspleniineae
- Family: Thelypteridaceae
- Genus: Phegopteris
- Species: P. hexagonoptera

Binomial name
- Phegopteris hexagonoptera (Michx.) Fée
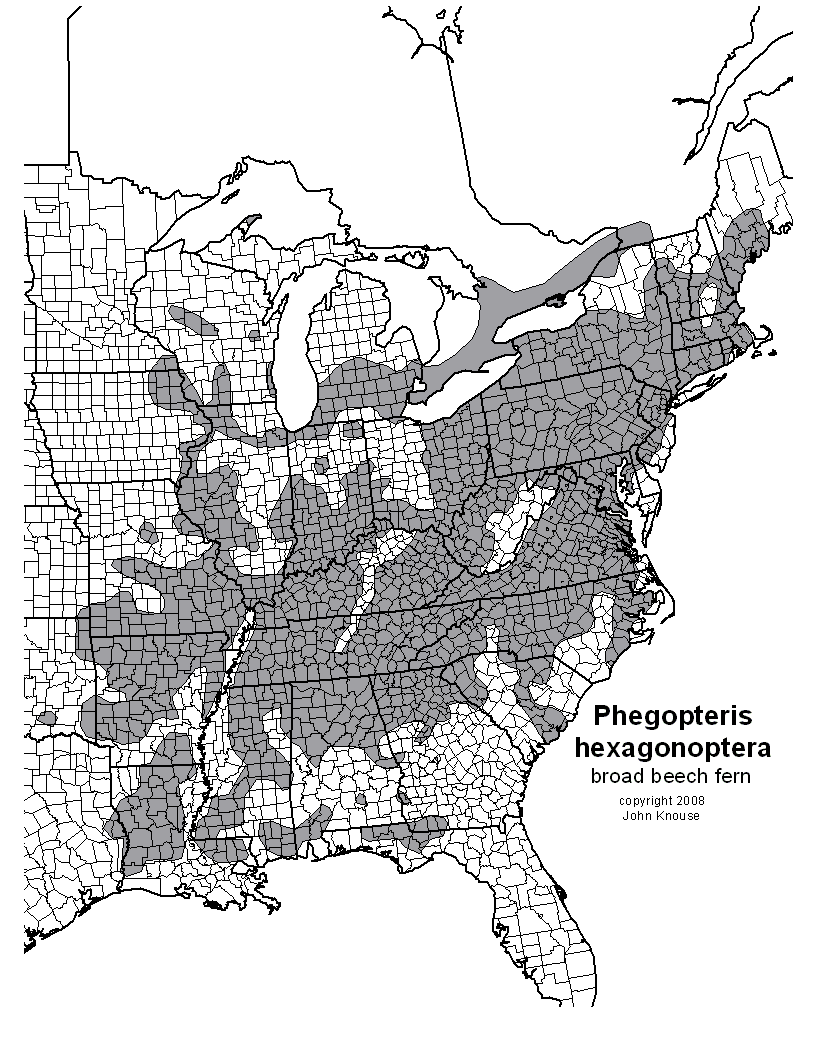
- Distribution

Synonyms
- Dryopteris hexagonoptera (Michx.) C. Chr. Thelypteris hexagonoptera (Michx.) Weath.

= Phegopteris hexagonoptera =

Broad beech fern

Species of fern

Phegopteris hexagonoptera, commonly called the broad beech fern, is a common forest fern in the eastern United States and adjacent Ontario. It grows from a creeping rootstock, sending up individual fronds that more or less clump. Its native habitat includes moist, undisturbed, hardwood forests.

The fronds are broadly triangular. The specific name hexagonoptera refers to the winging of leaf tissue along the rachis between the basal pinnae.

Sori are small, round and naked. This aspect of the plant has caused it in the past to be placed, at first, in the genus Polypodium, then grouped with genus Dryopteris, then with the genus Thelypteris. Genetic analysis has shown the genus Phegopteris to be a sister clade to the rest of the thelypteroid ferns.

== Taxonomy ==
The species was first described in 1803, typified on an illustration by Plukenet, by André Michaux, who named it Polypodium hexagonopterum. His description refers to an oblong-hexagonal membrane connecting opposite pinnae, presumably the source of the specific epithet.
