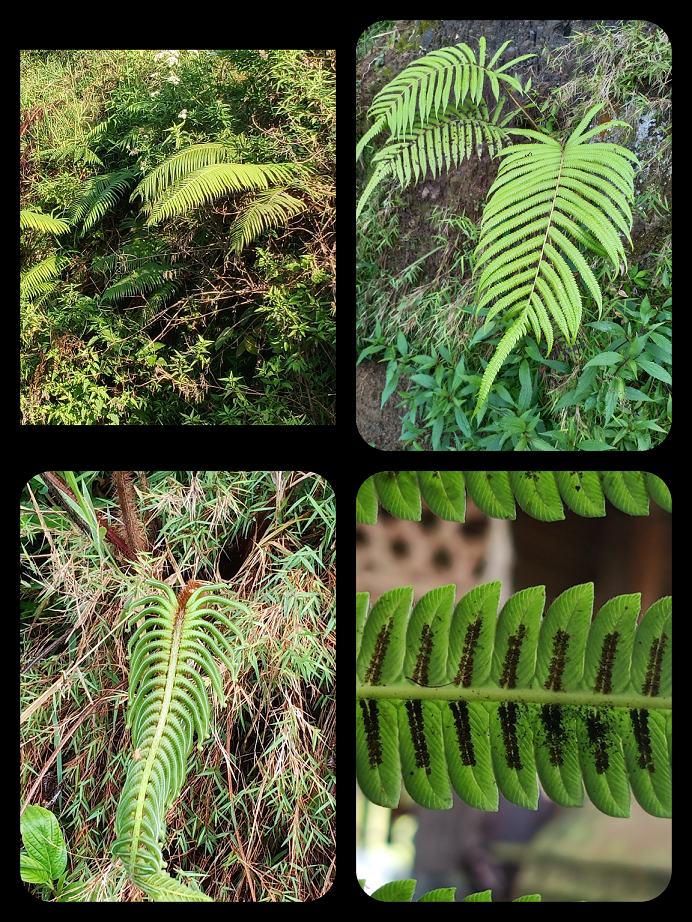
- Chingia (probably C. ferox)

Scientific classification
- Kingdom: Plantae
- Clade: Tracheophytes
- Division: Polypodiophyta
- Class: Polypodiopsida
- Order: Polypodiales
- Suborder: Aspleniineae
- Family: Thelypteridaceae
- Subfamily: Thelypteridoideae
- Genus: Chingia; Holttum

= Chingia =

Genus of plants

Chingia is a genus of ferns belonging to the family Thelypteridaceae.

The 25 species of this genus are found in Malesia.

== Species ==
Species:

- Chingia acutidens Holttum
- Chingia atrospinosa (C.Chr. ex Kjellb. & C.Chr.) Holttum
- Chingia australis Holttum
- Chingia bewaniensis Holttum
- Chingia christii (Copel.) Holttum
- Chingia clavipilosa Holttum
- Chingia ferox (Blume) Holttum
- Chingia fijiensis Game, S.E.Fawc. & A.R.Sm.
- Chingia horridipes (Alderw.) Holttum
- Chingia imponens (Ces.) Holttum
- Chingia lindleyi (W.N.Takeuchi) S.E.Fawc. & A.R.Sm.
- Chingia longissima (Brack.) Holttum
- Chingia lorzingii Holttum
- Chingia malodora (Copel.) Holttum
- Chingia marattioides (Alston) S.E.Fawc. & A.R.Sm.
- Chingia muricata (Brause) Holttum
- Chingia paucipaleata Holttum
- Chingia perrigida (Alderw.) Holttum
- Chingia pricei Holttum
- Chingia sakayensis (Zeiller) Holttum
- Chingia sambasensis Holttum
- Chingia supraspinigera (Rosenst.) Holttum
- Chingia tenerior Holttum
- Chingia tortuosa S.E.Fawc., C.W.Chen & A.R.Sm.
- Chingia urens Holttum
