= Astragalin =

- Astragalin structure

Names
- IUPAC name 3-(β-D-Glucopyranosyloxy)-4′,5,7-trihydroxyflavone
- Systematic IUPAC name 5,7-Dihydroxy-2-(4-hydroxyphenyl)-3-{[(2S,3R,4S,5S,6R)-3,4,5-trihydroxy-6-(hydroxymethyl)oxan-2-yl]oxy}-4H-1-benzopyran-4-one
- Other names Astragaline asragalin kaempferol-3-glucoside Kaempferol 3-glucoside Kaempferol 3-O-glucoside; Kaempferol-3-O-glucoside; Kaempferol-3-D-glucoside; Kaempferol-3-beta-monoglucoside; Kaempferol 3-O-β-D-glucopyranoside

Identifiers
CAS Number	480-10-4
3D model (JSmol)	Interactive image
Beilstein Reference	100568
ChEBI	CHEBI:30200
ChEMBL	ChEMBL453290
ChemSpider	4445311
ECHA InfoCard	100.128.596
KEGG	C12249
PubChem CID	5282102
UNII	APM8UQ3Z9O
CompTox Dashboard (EPA)	DTXSID801017739
- InChI: InChI=1S/C21H20O11/c22-7-13-15(26)17(28)18(29)21(31-13)32-20-16(27)14-11(25)5-10(24)6-12(14)30-19(20)8-1-3-9(23)4-2-8/h1-6,13,15,17-18,21-26,28-29H,7H2/t13-,15-,17+,18-,21+/m1/s1 Key: JPUKWEQWGBDDQB-QSOFNFLRSA-N; InChI=1/C21H20O11/c22-7-13-15(26)17(28)18(29)21(31-13)32-20-16(27)14-11(25)5-10(24)6-12(14)30-19(20)8-1-3-9(23)4-2-8/h1-6,13,15,17-18,21-26,28-29H,7H2/t13-,15-,17+,18-,21+/m1/s1 Key: JPUKWEQWGBDDQB-QSOFNFLRBV
- SMILES: O=C2C(\O[C@@H]1O[C@@H]([C@@H](O)[C@H](O)[C@H]1O)CO)=C(/Oc3cc(O)cc(O)c23)c4ccc(O)cc4

Properties
Chemical formula	C_{21}H_{20}O_{11}
Molar mass	448.380 g·mol^{−1}
Density	1.791 g/mL
- Except where otherwise noted, data are given for materials in their standard state (at 25 °C [77 °F], 100 kPa). verify (what is ?) Infobox references

Astragalin is a naturally occurring flavanoid chemical compound with a yellow colour. It was first isolated from Astragalus sinicus after which it is named.

It can be isolated from Phytolacca americana (the American pokeweed) or in the methanolic extract of fronds of the fern Phegopteris connectilis. It is also found in wine.

Astragalin is a 3-O-glucoside of kaempferol.
