= Glaphyropteridopsis =

Scientific classification
- Kingdom: Plantae
- Clade: Embryophytes
- Clade: Tracheophytes
- Division: Polypodiophyta
- Class: Polypodiopsida
- Order: Polypodiales
- Suborder: Aspleniineae
- Family: Thelypteridaceae
- Subfamily: Thelypteridoideae
- Genus: Glaphyropteridopsis; Ching; Acta phytotax. Sin. 8: 320 (1963)

Species
- See text.

Genus of plants

Glaphyropteridopsis is a genus of ferns in the subfamily Thelypteridoideae, family Thelypteridaceae, order Polypodiales. It is recognized in the Pteridophyte Phylogeny Group classification of 2016 (PPG I); in other approaches, it may be merged with Thelypteris.

== Uses ==
Glaphyropteridopsis erubescens is traditionally used in the production of kinema and fermented cakes called marcha. It is applied to scorpion bites in Nigeria. It is mixed with rice water and drunk as a diarrhea remedy in India.

== Species ==
According to World Ferns, which uses the PPG I framework:

- Glaphyropteridopsis emeiensis Y.X.Lin; Fl. Reipubl. Popul. Sin. 4(1): 324 (1999)
- Glaphyropteridopsis eriocarpa Ching; Acta Phytotax. Sin. 8: 321 (1963)
- Glaphyropteridopsis erubescens (Wall. ex Hook.) Ching; Acta Phytotax. Sin. 8: 320 (1963)
  - Wide distribution.
- Glaphyropteridopsis glabrata Ching & W.M.Chu ex Y.X.Lin; Fl. Reipubl. Popul. Sin. 4(1): 325 (1999)
- Glaphyropteridopsis mollis Ching & Y.X.Lin; Fl. Reipubl. Popul. Sin. 4(1): 324 (1999)
- Glaphyropteridopsis jinfushanensis Ching ex Y.X.Lin; Fl. Reipubl. Popularis Sin. 4(1): 134–135, t. 25, f. 5-7(1999)
- Glaphyropteridopsis pallida Ching & W.M.Chu; Fl. Reipubl. Popul. Sin. 4(1): 325 (1999)
- Glaphyropteridopsis rufostraminea (Christ) Ching; Acta Phytotax. Sin. 8: 321 (1963)
- Glaphyropteridopsis sichuanensis Y.X.Lin; Fl. Reipubl. Popul. Sin. 4(1): 324 (1999)
- Glaphyropteridopsis splendens Ching; Acta Phytotax. Sin. 8: 322 (1963)
- Glaphyropteridopsis villosa Ching & W.M.Chu; Fl. Reipubl. Popul. Sin. 4(1): 325 (1999)
