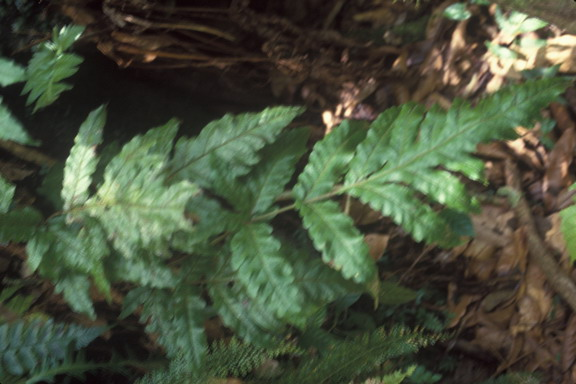
- Goniopteris yaucoensis

Scientific classification
- Kingdom: Plantae
- Clade: Tracheophytes
- Division: Polypodiophyta
- Class: Polypodiopsida
- Order: Polypodiales
- Suborder: Aspleniineae
- Family: Thelypteridaceae
- Subfamily: Thelypteridoideae
- Genus: Goniopteris; C.Presl

Species
- See text.

Synonyms
- Thelypteris subg. Goniopteris (C.Presl) Duek; Polypodium subg. Goniopteris (C.Presl) C.B.Clarke; Thelypteris sect. Goniopteris (C.Presl) C.F.Reed

= Goniopteris =

Genus of ferns

Goniopteris is a genus of ferns in the family Thelypteridaceae, subfamily Thelypteridoideae, in the Pteridophyte Phylogeny Group classification of 2016 (PPG I). Other sources sink Goniopteris into a very broadly defined genus Thelypteris.

== Species ==
As of January 2020, the Checklist of Ferns and Lycophytes of the World accepted the following species:

- Goniopteris abdita (Proctor) Salino & T.E.Almeida
- Goniopteris abrupta (Desv.) A.R.Sm.
- Goniopteris alan-smithiana (L.D.Gómez) Salino & T.E.Almeida
- Goniopteris alata (L.) Ching
- Goniopteris amazonica (Salino & R.S.Fern.) Salino & T.E.Almeida
- Goniopteris ancyriothrix (Rosenst.) Salino & T.E.Almeida
- Goniopteris anoptera (Kunze ex Kuhn) Salino & T.E.Almeida
- Goniopteris asplenioides (Sw.) C.Presl
- Goniopteris aureola (A.R.Sm.) Salino & T.E.Almeida
- Goniopteris beckeriana (F.B.Matos, A.R.Sm. & Labiak) Salino & T.E.Almeida
- Goniopteris berlinii (A.R.Sm.) Salino & T.E.Almeida
- Goniopteris bermudiana (Baker) comb. ined.
- Goniopteris bibrachiata (Jenman) Salino & T.E.Almeida
- Goniopteris biformata (Rosenst.) Salino & T.E.Almeida
- Goniopteris biolleyi (Christ) Pic.Serm.
- Goniopteris blanda (Fée) Salino & T.E.Almeida
- Goniopteris bradei Salino
- Goniopteris brittonae (Sloss. ex Maxon) Ching
- Goniopteris burkartii Abbiatti
- Goniopteris calypso (L.D.Gómez) Salino & T.E.Almeida
- Goniopteris chocoensis (A.R.Sm. & Lellinger) Salino & T.E.Almeida
- Goniopteris clarkei (Baker) Ching
- Goniopteris clypeata (Maxon & C.V.Morton) Salino & T.E.Almeida
- Goniopteris coalescens (Baker) Ching
- Goniopteris cordata (Fée) Salino & T.E.Almeida
- Goniopteris costaricensis Salino & T.E.Almeida
- Goniopteris crassipila (Caluff & C.Sánchez) Salino & T.E.Almeida
- Goniopteris croatii (A.R.Sm.) Salino & T.E.Almeida
- Goniopteris crypta (Underw. & Maxon) Ching
- Goniopteris cumingiana (Kunze) de Jonch. & U.Sen
- Goniopteris cuneata (C.Chr.) Brade
- Goniopteris curta (Christ) A.R.Sm.
- Goniopteris cutiataensis (Brade) Brade
- Goniopteris devolvens (Baker) comb. ined.
- Goniopteris dissimulans (Maxon & C.Chr.) Salino & T.E.Almeida
- Goniopteris eggersii (Hieron.) Alston
- Goniopteris equitans (Christ) Salino & T.E.Almeida
- Goniopteris erythrothrix (A.R.Sm.) Salino & T.E.Almeida
- Goniopteris francoana (E.Fourn.) Á.Löve & D.Löve
- Goniopteris fraseri (Mett. ex Kuhn) Salino & A.R.Sm.
- Goniopteris gemmulifera (Hieron.) Vareschi
- Goniopteris ghiesbreghtii (Linden) J.Sm.
- Goniopteris goeldii (C.Chr.) Brade
- Goniopteris gonophora (Weath.) Salino & T.E.Almeida
- Goniopteris hastata Fée
- Goniopteris hatchii (A.R.Sm.) Á.Löve & D.Löve
- Goniopteris hildae (Proctor) Salino & T.E.Almeida
- Goniopteris holodictya (K.U.Kramer) Salino & T.E.Almeida
- Goniopteris hondurensis (L.D.Gómez) Salino & T.E.Almeida
- Goniopteris iguapensis (C.Chr.) Brade
- Goniopteris imbricata (Liebm.) Á.Löve & D.Löve
- Goniopteris imitata (C.Chr.) Salino & T.E.Almeida
- Goniopteris incisa (Sw.) C.Presl
- Goniopteris indusiata (Salino) Salino & T.E.Almeida
- Goniopteris jamesonii (Hook.) Salino & T.E.Almeida
- Goniopteris jarucoensis (Caluff & C.Sánchez) Salino & T.E.Almeida
- Goniopteris juruensis (C.Chr.) Brade
- Goniopteris killipii (A.R.Sm. & Lellinger) Salino & T.E.Almeida
- Goniopteris leonina (Caluff & C.Sánchez) Salino & T.E.Almeida
- Goniopteris leptocladia Fée
- Goniopteris levyi (E.Fourn.) Salino & T.E.Almeida
- Goniopteris liebmannii (Maxon & C.V.Morton) Salino & T.E.Almeida
- Goniopteris littoralis (Salino) Salino & T.E.Almeida
- Goniopteris lugubriformis (Rosenst.) Salino & T.E.Almeida
- Goniopteris lugubris (Mett.) Brade
- Goniopteris macrotis (Hook.) Pic.Serm.
- Goniopteris martinezii (A.R.Sm.) Salino & T.E.Almeida
- Goniopteris minor (C.Chr.) Salino & T.E.Almeida
- Goniopteris minutissima (Caluff & C.Sánchez) Salino & T.E.Almeida
- Goniopteris monosora (C.Presl) Brade
- Goniopteris montana (Salino) Salino & T.E.Almeida
- Goniopteris moranii C.Sánchez
- Goniopteris munchii (A.R.Sm.) Salino & T.E.Almeida
- Goniopteris multigemmifera (Salino) Salino & T.E.Almeida
- Goniopteris nephrodioides (Klotzsch) Vareschi
- Goniopteris nicaraguensis (E.Fourn.) Salino & T.E.Almeida
- Goniopteris nigricans (Ekman & C.Chr.) Salino & T.E.Almeida
- Goniopteris obliterata (Sw.) C.Presl
- Goniopteris oroniensis (L.D.Gómez) Salino & T.E.Almeida
- Goniopteris paranaensis (Salino) Salino & T.E.Almeida
- Goniopteris paucijuga (Klotzsch) A.R.Sm.
- Goniopteris paucipinnata (Donn.Sm.) Salino & T.E.Almeida
- Goniopteris pellita (Willd.) A.R.Sm.
- Goniopteris pennata (Poir.) Pic.Serm.
- Goniopteris peripae (Sodiro) Salino & T.E.Almeida
- Goniopteris peripaeoides (L.D.Gómez) comb. ined.
- Goniopteris pilonensis (A.R.Sm. & M.Kessler) Salino & T.E.Almeida
- Goniopteris pinnatifida (A.R.Sm.) Salino & T.E.Almeida
- Goniopteris platypes Fée
- Goniopteris poiteana (Bory) C.Presl
- Goniopteris praetermissa (Maxon) Salino & T.E.Almeida
- Goniopteris radicans (L.) Farw.
- Goniopteris redunca (A.R.Sm.) Salino & T.E.Almeida
- Goniopteris refracta (Fisch. & Mey.) J.Sm.
- Goniopteris resiliens (Maxon) Salino & T.E.Almeida
- Goniopteris retroflexa (L.) Salino & T.E.Almeida
- Goniopteris rhachiflexuosa (Riba) Salino & T.E.Almeida
- Goniopteris sagittata (Sw.) Pic.Serm.
- Goniopteris salinoi I.O.Moura & L.C.Moura
- Goniopteris sapechoana (A.R.Sm. & M.Kessler) Salino & T.E.Almeida
- Goniopteris scabra (C.Presl) Brade
- Goniopteris schaffneri (Fée) Salino & T.E.Almeida
- Goniopteris schippii (Weath.) Salino & T.E.Almeida
- Goniopteris schomburgkii (A.R.Sm.) Salino & T.E.Almeida
- Goniopteris schunkei (A.R.Sm.) Salino & T.E.Almeida
- Goniopteris schwackeana (Christ) Brade
- Goniopteris sclerophylla (Poepp. ex Spreng.) Pic.Serm.
- Goniopteris seidleri Salino
- Goniopteris semihastata (Kunze) Salino & T.E.Almeida
- Goniopteris semirii (Salino & L.C.N.Melo) Salino & T.E.Almeida
- Goniopteris septemjuga (C.Chr.) Salino & T.E.Almeida
- Goniopteris serrulata (Sw.) J.Sm.
- Goniopteris skinneri (Hook.) Salino & T.E.Almeida
- Goniopteris smithii Salino
- Goniopteris stephanii (A.R.Sm. & M.Kessler) Salino & T.E.Almeida
- Goniopteris stolzeana (A.R.Sm.) Salino & T.E.Almeida
- Goniopteris subdimorpha Salino
- Goniopteris subsagittata (Maxon & C.Chr.) Salino & T.E.Almeida
- Goniopteris tannensis (C.Chr.) Ching
- Goniopteris tenebrica (Jenman) Salino & T.E.Almeida
- Goniopteris tenera Fée
- Goniopteris tetragona (Sw.) C.Presl
- Goniopteris toganetra (A.R.Sm.) Á.Löve & D.Löve
- Goniopteris tristis (Kunze) Brade
- Goniopteris tryoniorum (A.R.Sm.) Salino & T.E.Almeida
- Goniopteris tuxtlensis (T.Krömer, Acebey & A.R.Sm.) Salino & T.E.Almeida
- Goniopteris urbani (Sodiro) Salino & T.E.Almeida
- Goniopteris venusta (Heward) comb. ined.
- Goniopteris verecunda (Proctor) Salino & T.E.Almeida
- Goniopteris vivipara (Raddi) Brack.
- Goniopteris windischii Salino
- Goniopteris yaucoensis (Proctor) Salino & T.E.Almeida
