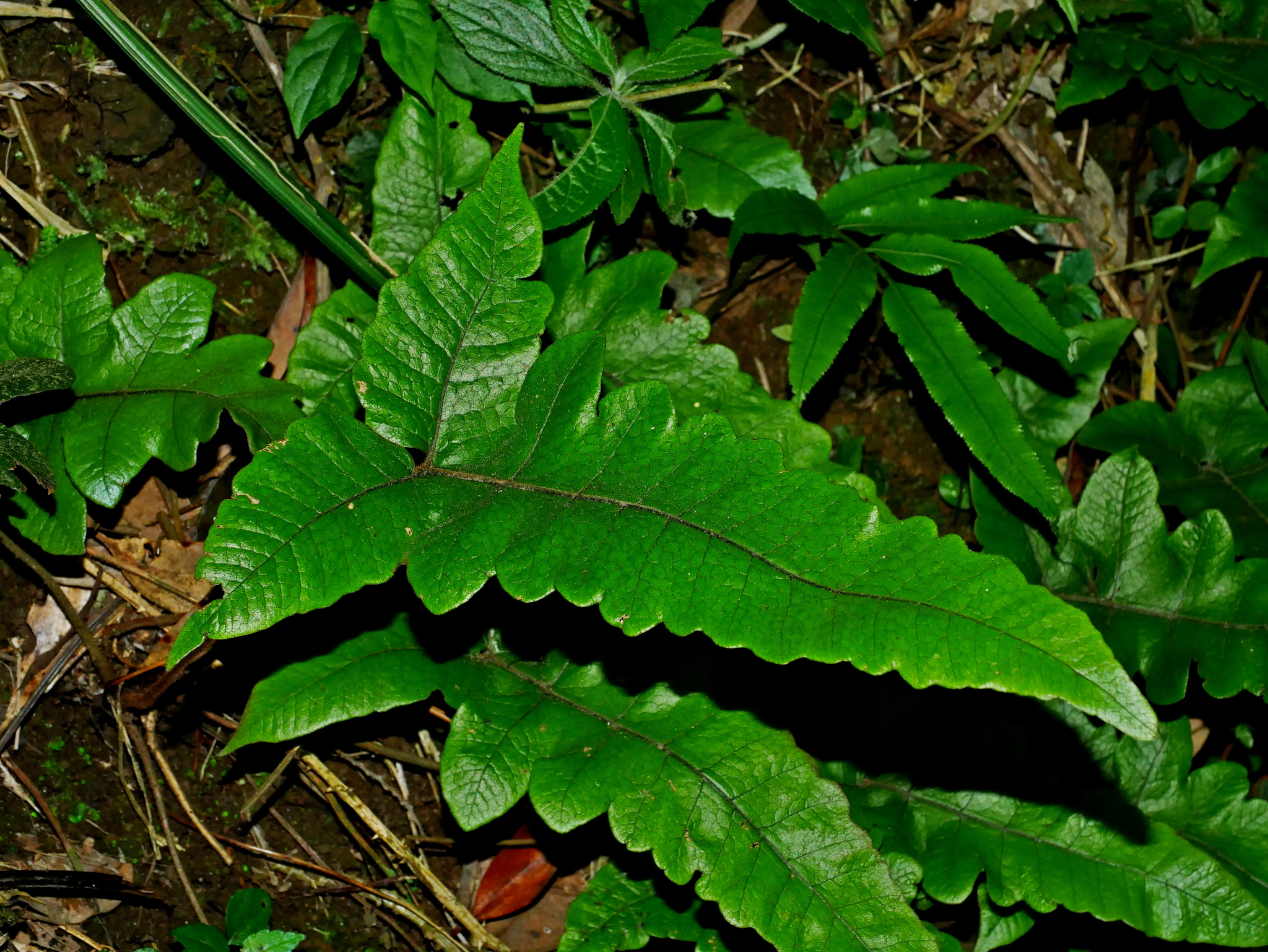
- Stegnogramma wilfordii in Taiwan

Scientific classification
- Kingdom: Plantae
- Clade: Tracheophytes
- Division: Polypodiophyta
- Class: Polypodiopsida
- Order: Polypodiales
- Suborder: Aspleniineae
- Family: Thelypteridaceae
- Subfamily: Thelypteridoideae
- Genus: Stegnogramma; Blume

Species
- See text.

Synonyms
- Craspedosorus Ching & W.M.Chu; Dictyocline Moore; Gymnogramma subg. Stenogramma (Blume) C.B.Clarke; Leptogramma J.Sm.; Thelypteris subg. Dictyocline (T.Moore) C.F.Reed; Thelypteris subg. Leptogramma (J.Sm.) C.F.Reed; Thelypteris sect. Stegnogramma (Blume) Fraser-Jenk.; Thelypteris subg. Stegnogramma (Blume) C.F.Reed

= Stegnogramma =

Genus of ferns

Stegnogramma is a genus of ferns in the subfamily Thelypteridoideae of the family Thelypteridaceae in the Pteridophyte Phylogeny Group classification of 2016 (PPG I). Other sources sink Stegnogramma into a very broadly defined genus Thelypteris.

== Species ==
As of January 2020, the Checklist of Ferns and Lycophytes of the World accepted the following species:

- Stegnogramma amabilis (Tagawa) Nakaike
- Stegnogramma aspidioides Blume
- Stegnogramma burksiorum (J.E.Watkins & Farrar) Weakley
- Stegnogramma calcicola Co
- Stegnogramma celebica (Ching) Holttum
- Stegnogramma centrochinensis (Ching ex Y.X.Lin) comb. ined.
- Stegnogramma crenata Holttum
- Stegnogramma cyrtomioides (C.Chr.) Ching
- Stegnogramma dictyoclinoides Ching
- Stegnogramma dissitifolia Holttum
- Stegnogramma griffithii (T.Moore) K.Iwats.
- Stegnogramma gymnocarpa (Copel.) K.Iwats.
- Stegnogramma huishuiensis (Ching ex Y.X.Lin) comb. ined.
- Stegnogramma intermedia (Ching ex Y.X.Lin) comb. ined.
- Stegnogramma jinfoshanensis Ching & Z.Y.Liu
- Stegnogramma leptogrammoides K.Iwats.
- Stegnogramma mingchegensis (Ching) X.C.Zhang & L.J.He
- Stegnogramma mollissima (Fisch. ex Kunze) Fraser-Jenk.
- Stegnogramma pilosa (M.Martens & Galeotti) K.Iwats.
- Stegnogramma pozoi (Lag.) K.Iwats.
- Stegnogramma sagittifolia (Ching) L.J.He & X.C.Zhang
- Stegnogramma scallanii (Christ) K.Iwats.
- Stegnogramma sinensis (Ching & W.M.Chu) L.J.He & X.C.Zhang
- Stegnogramma sinica (Ching ex Y.X.Lin) comb. ined.
- Stegnogramma stegnogrammopsis (C.F.Reed) comb. ined.
- Stegnogramma subcalcarata (Alderw.) Holttum
- Stegnogramma tottoides (H.Itô) K.Iwats.
- Stegnogramma wilfordii (Hook.) Seriz.
- Stegnogramma xingwenensis Ching ex Y.X.Lin
- Stegnogramma yahanensis (Ching ex Y.X.Lin) comb. ined.
