= Stegnogramma pilosa =

Scientific classification
- Kingdom: Plantae
- Clade: Tracheophytes
- Division: Polypodiophyta
- Class: Polypodiopsida
- Order: Polypodiales
- Suborder: Aspleniineae
- Family: Thelypteridaceae
- Genus: Stegnogramma
- Species: S. pilosa

Binomial name
- Stegnogramma pilosa (M.Martens & Galeotti) K.Iwats.

Synonyms
- Dryopteris pilosa (M.Martens & Galeotti) C.Chr.; Dryopteris pseudototta Christ; Gymnogramma pilosa M.Martens & Galeotti; Gymnogramma pilosa var.major E.Fourn.; Gymnogramma procurrens Fée; Lastrea pilosa (M.Martens & Galeotti) Copel.; Leptogramma pilosa (M.Martens & Galeotti) Underw.; Phegopteris pilosa (M.Martens & Galeotti) Mett.; Phegopteris procurrens Mett.ex Salomon; Stegnogramma pilosa var. major (E.Fourn.) K.Iwats.; Thelypteris pilosa (M.Martens & Galeotti) Crawford; Thelypteris pilosa var. major (E.Fourn.) Crawford

Species of fern

Stegnogramma pilosa, synonym Thelypteris pilosa, is a fern species in the family Thelypteridaceae. It is closely related to Stegnogramma burksiorum (syn. Thelypteris burksiorum); the two have been treated as a species complex. Stegnogramma pilosa is native to Mexico, Guatemala and Honduras.

When combined with S. burksiorum, it has been called hairy maiden fern, softhairy maiden fern, and streak-sorus fern.
