= Menisciopsis =

Scientific classification
- Kingdom: Plantae
- Clade: Tracheophytes
- Division: Polypodiophyta
- Class: Polypodiopsida
- Order: Polypodiales
- Suborder: Aspleniineae
- Family: Thelypteridaceae
- Genus: Menisciopsis (Holttum) S.E.Fawc. & A.R.Sm.

Species
- See text.

Synonyms
- Pronephrium sect. Menisciopsis Holttum

Genus of ferns

Menisciopsis is a small genus of ferns in the family Thelypteridaceae.

== Taxonomy ==
Menisciopsis was raised to the rank of genus from Pronephrium sect. Menisciopsis in 2021 as a result of a phylogenetic study of the family Thelypteridaceae.

=== Species ===
As of June 2022, World Ferns accepted the following species:

- Menisciopsis boydiae (D.C.Eaton) S.E.Fawc. & A.R.Sm.
- Menisciopsis cyatheoides (Kaulf.) S.E.Fawc. & A.R.Sm.
- Menisciopsis lakhimpurensis (Rosenst.) S.E.Fawc. & A.R.Sm.
- Menisciopsis penangiana (Hook.) S.E.Fawc. & A.R.Sm.
- Menisciopsis rubida (J.Sm. ex Hook.) S.E.Fawc. & A.R.Sm.
- Menisciopsis rubrinervis (Mett.) S.E.Fawc. & A.R.Sm.
- Menisciopsis wailele (Flynn) S.E.Fawc. & A.R.Sm.
