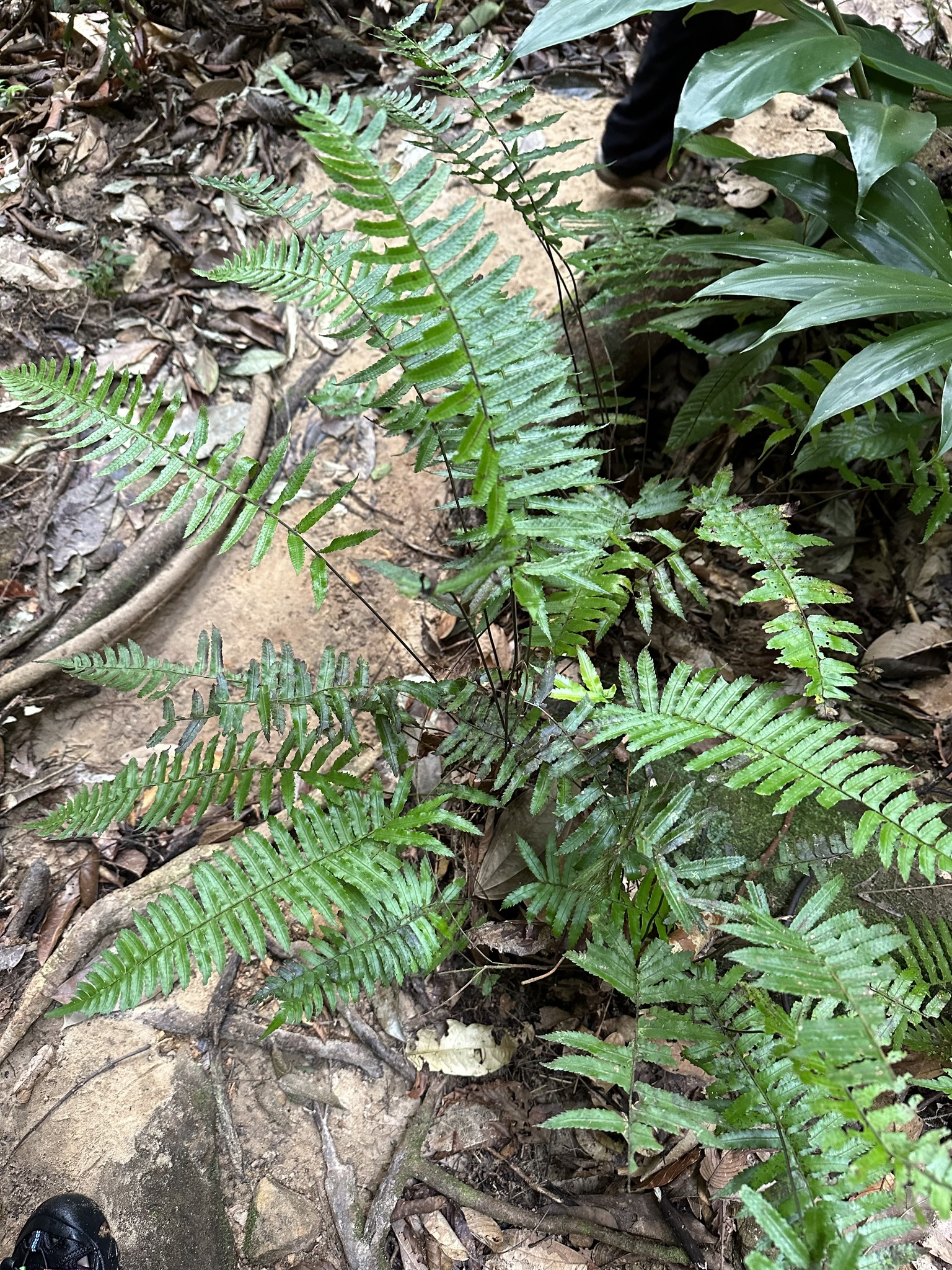
- Pronephrium hewittii in Malaysia

Scientific classification
- Kingdom: Plantae
- Clade: Tracheophytes
- Division: Polypodiophyta
- Class: Polypodiopsida
- Order: Polypodiales
- Suborder: Aspleniineae
- Family: Thelypteridaceae
- Subfamily: Thelypteridoideae
- Genus: Pronephrium; C.Presl

Species
- See text.

Synonyms
- Dimorphopteris Tagawa & K.Iwats.; Haplodictyum C.Presl; Nannothelypteris Holttum; Pronephrium subg. Menisciopsis Holttum; Thelypteris subg. Dimorphopteris K.Iwats.; Thelypteris subg. Haplodictyum K.Iwats.

= Pronephrium =

Genus of ferns

Pronephrium is a genus of ferns in the family Thelypteridaceae, subfamily Thelypteridoideae, in the Pteridophyte Phylogeny Group classification of 2016 (PPG I). Other sources sink Pronephrium into a very broadly defined genus Thelypteris. Some species were split off into the genera Abacopteris, Grypothrix and Menisciopsis in 2021 as a result of a phylogenetic study of the family Thelypteridaceae.

The genus was first described in 1851 by Carl Borivoj Presl.

== Species ==
As of June 2022, the Checklist of Ferns and Lycophytes of the World accepted the following species and hybrids:

- Pronephrium affine (Blume) C.Presl
- Pronephrium amboinense (Willd.) Holttum
- Pronephrium amphitrichum Holttum
- Pronephrium aoristisorum (Harr.) S.E.Fawc. & A.R.Sm.
- Pronephrium aquatiloides (Copel.) Holttum
- Pronephrium borneense (Hook.) Holttum
- Pronephrium camarinense (Holttum) S.E.Fawc. & A.R.Sm.
- Pronephrium celebicum (Baker) Holttum
- Pronephrium clemensiae (Copel.) Holttum
- Pronephrium euryphyllum (Rosenst.) Holttum
- Pronephrium exsculptum (Baker) Holttum
- Pronephrium fidelei Rakotondr.
- Pronephrium firmulum (Baker) Holttum
- Pronephrium giluwense Holttum
- Pronephrium granulosum (C.Presl) Holttum
- Pronephrium hewittii (Copel.) Holttum
- Pronephrium hosei (Baker) Holttum
- Pronephrium inaequilobatum (Holttum) S.E.Fawc. & A.R.Sm.
- Pronephrium kjellbergii Holttum
- Pronephrium lineatum (Blume) C.Presl
- Pronephrium manuselense M.Kato
- Pronephrium marojejyensis Rakotondr.
- Pronephrium menisciicarpon (Blume) Holttum
- Pronephrium merrillii (Christ) Holttum
- Pronephrium millarae Holttum
- Pronephrium minahassae Holttum
- Pronephrium moniliforme (Tagawa & K.Iwats.) Holttum
- Pronephrium murkelense (M.Kato) S.E.Fawc. & A.R.Sm.
- Pronephrium nervosum (Fee) S.E.Fawc. & A.R.Sm.
- Pronephrium palauense (Hosok.) Holttum
- Pronephrium peltatum (Alderw.) Holttum
- Pronephrium peramalense Holttum
- Pronephrium philippinum (C.Presl) S.E.Fawc. & A.R.Sm.
- Pronephrium rhombeum (Christ) Holttum
- Pronephrium samarense (Copel.) Holttum
- Pronephrium simillimum (C.Chr.) Holttum
- Pronephrium solsonicum Holttum
- Pronephrium thysanoides Holttum
- Pronephrium trachyphyllum Holttum
- Pronephrium xiphioides (Christ) Holttum

Hybrids

- Pronephrium × interruptum Holttum
- Pronephrium × liukiuense (Christ) Nakaike
- Pronephrium × occultum (C.Hope) comb.ined.
