= Pelazoneuron =

Scientific classification
- Kingdom: Plantae
- Clade: Tracheophytes
- Division: Polypodiophyta
- Class: Polypodiopsida
- Order: Polypodiales
- Suborder: Aspleniineae
- Family: Thelypteridaceae
- Subfamily: Thelypteridoideae
- Genus: Pelazoneuron (Holttum) A.R.Sm. & S.E.Fawc.

Genus of ferns

Pelazoneuron is a genus of ferns in the order Polypodiales. Pelazoneuron has been observed in the southeast region of the United States, as well as parts of Central America and northeast South America.

== Taxonomy ==
Pelazoneuron contains the following species:

- Pelazoneuron blepharis
- Pelazoneuron berroi
- Pelazoneuron clivale
- Pelazoneuron cretaceum
- Pelazoneuron depilatum
- Pelazoneuron schizotis
- Pelazoneuron patens
- Pelazoneuron lanosum
- Pelazoneuron albicaule
- Pelazoneuron tuerckheimii
- Pelazoneuron serra
- Pelazoneuron puberulum
- Pelazoneuron kunthii
- Pelazoneuron augescens
- Pelazoneuron abruptum
- Pelazoneuron ovatum
