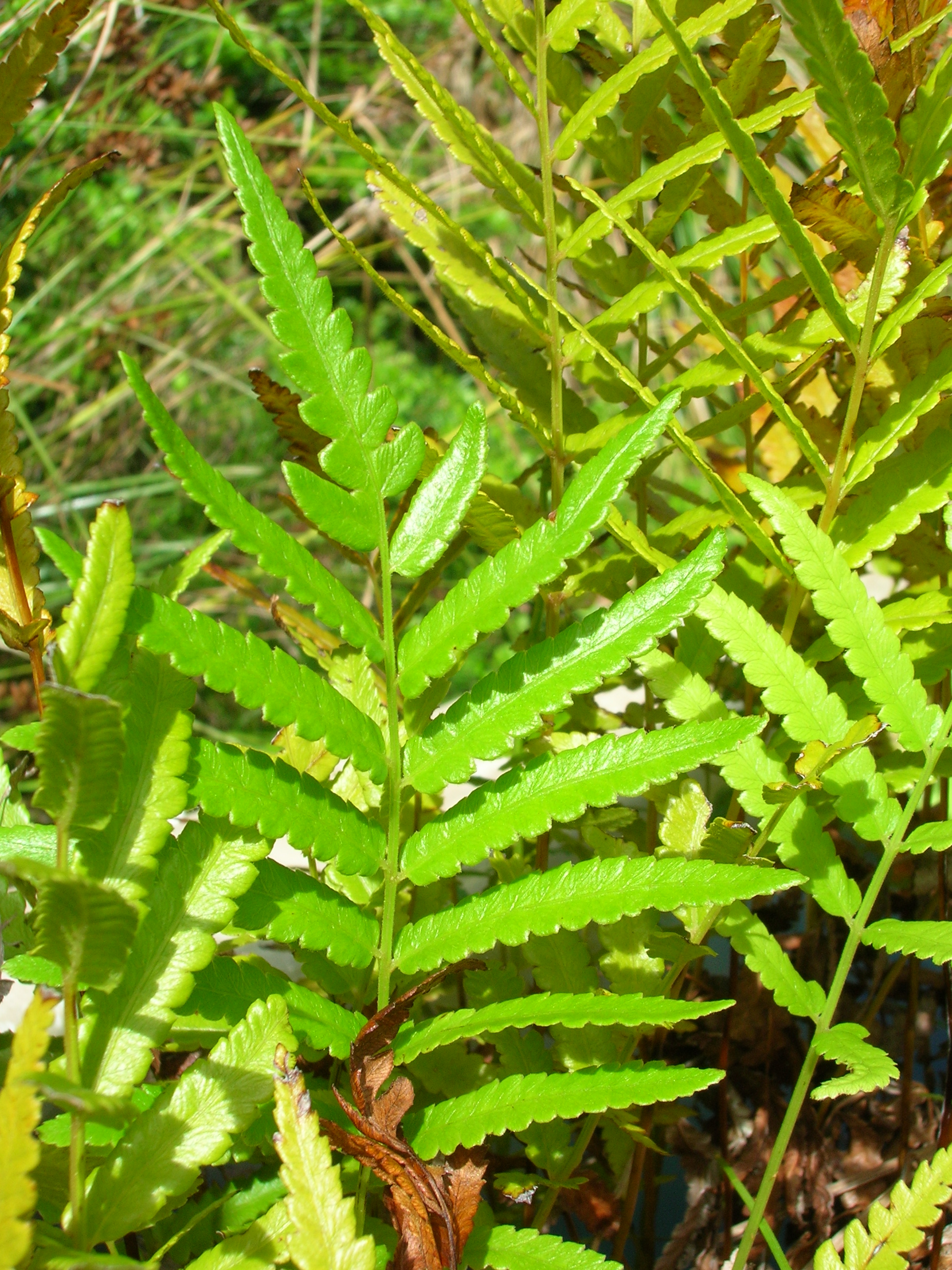
- Cyclosorus interruptus

Scientific classification
- Kingdom: Plantae
- Clade: Tracheophytes
- Division: Polypodiophyta
- Class: Polypodiopsida
- Order: Polypodiales
- Suborder: Aspleniineae
- Family: Thelypteridaceae
- Subfamily: Thelypteridoideae
- Genus: Cyclosorus; Link

= Cyclosorus =

Genus of ferns

Cyclosorus is a genus of ferns in the family Thelypteridaceae, subfamily Thelypteridoideae, in the Pteridophyte Phylogeny Group classification of 2016 (PPG I). Other sources sink Cyclosorus into a very broadly defined genus Thelypteris, or expand the genus to include other genera which PPG I keeps separate. Thus the online Flora of China suggests there are about 250 species compared to the two species suggested in PPG I.

There are also fossil species known from the Eocene of South China and the Quaternary of Australia.

The genus is named from the Greek, referring to the circular sori.

== Species ==
As of January 2020, the Checklist of Ferns and Lycophytes of the World accepted the following extant species, although noting that only two to four probably belonged in the genus sensu stricto, the rest needing in future to be distributed among other genera.

- Cyclosorus angustipinnatus C.Chr. & Tardieu ex Tardieu
- Cyclosorus attenuatus Ching ex K.H.Shing
- Cyclosorus cuneatus Ching ex K.H.Shing
- Cyclosorus exindusiatus (W.H.Wagner) W.H.Wagner
- Cyclosorus interruptus (Willd.) H.Itô
- Cyclosorus jinghongensis Ching ex K.H.Shing
- Cyclosorus lenormandii (C.Chr.) Ching
- Cyclosorus molundensis (Brause) Pic. Serm.
- Cyclosorus nanxiensis Ching ex K.H.Shing
- Cyclosorus parvifolius Ching
- Cyclosorus pygmaeus Ching & C.F.Zhang
- Cyclosorus shimenensis K.H.Shing & C.M.Zhang
- Cyclosorus striatus (Schum.) Ching
- Cyclosorus subacutus Ching
- Cyclosorus thailandicus S.Linds.
- Cyclosorus tottus (Thunb.) Pic. Serm.
- Cyclosorus wulingshanensis C.M.Zhang
