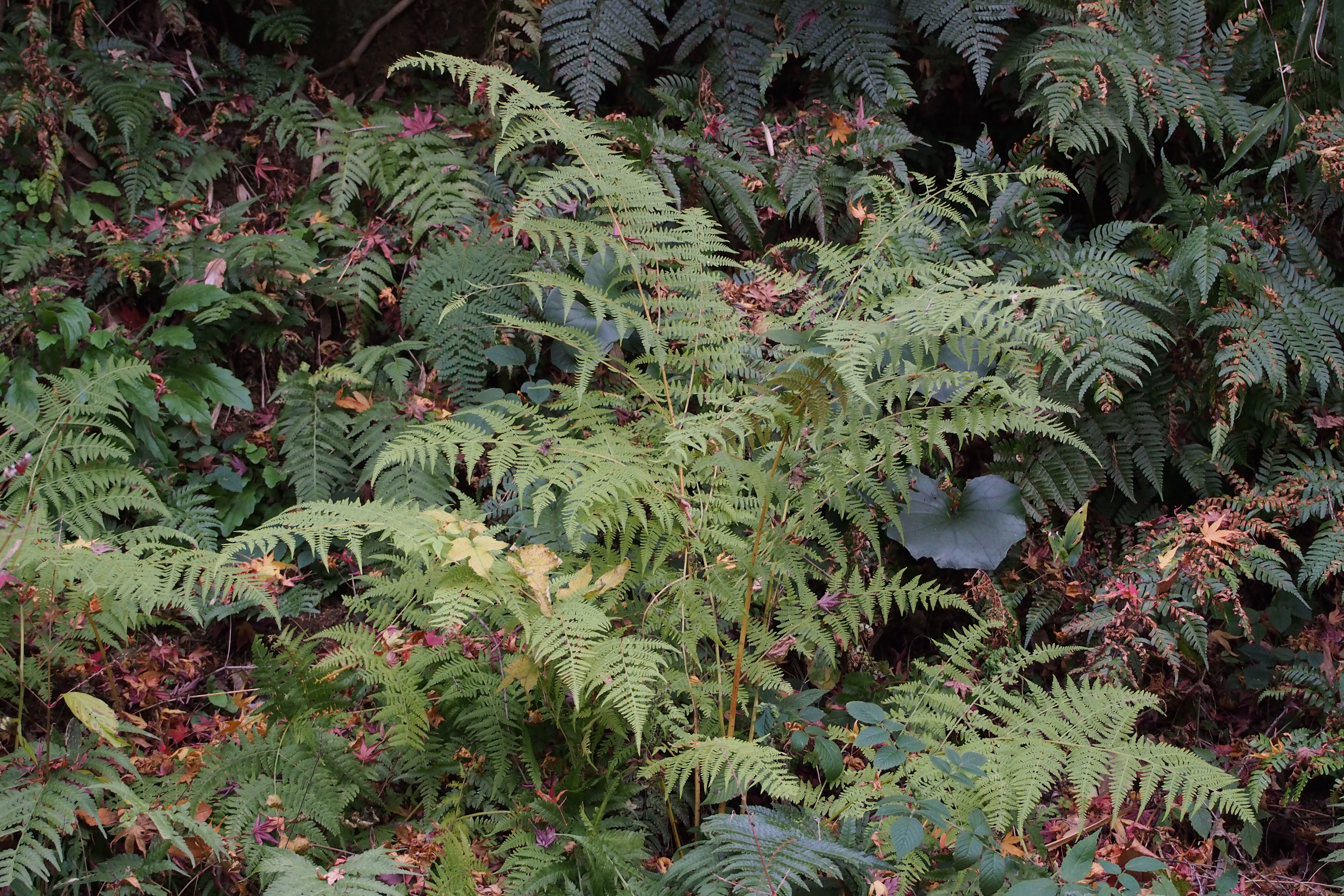
- Macrothelypteris torresiana in Kobe, Japan

Scientific classification
- Kingdom: Plantae
- Clade: Tracheophytes
- Division: Polypodiophyta
- Class: Polypodiopsida
- Order: Polypodiales
- Suborder: Aspleniineae
- Family: Thelypteridaceae
- Subfamily: Phegopteridoideae
- Genus: Macrothelypteris (H.Itô) Ching

Species
- See text.

= Macrothelypteris =

Genus of ferns

Macrothelypteris is a genus of ferns in the family Thelypteridaceae, subfamily Phegopteridoideae, in the Pteridophyte Phylogeny Group classification of 2016 (PPG I). The genus name means 'large Thelypteris'.

== Species ==
As of October 2026, the Checklist of Ferns and Lycophytes of the World and Plants of the World Online (POWO) listed the following 9 species and one hybrid:

- Macrothelypteris banaensis (Tardieu & C.Chr.) Christenh.
- Macrothelypteris contingens Ching
- Macrothelypteris multiseta (Baker) Ching
- Macrothelypteris ogasawarensis (Nakai) Holttum
- Macrothelypteris oligophlebia (Baker) Ching – treated as a synonym of Macrothelypteris torresiana in POWO
- Macrothelypteris ornata (J.Sm.) Ching
- Macrothelypteris polypodioides (Hook.) Holttum
- Macrothelypteris × subviridifrons (Seriz.) Nakaike
- Macrothelypteris torresiana (Gaudich.) Ching
- Macrothelypteris viridifrons (Tagawa) Ching
