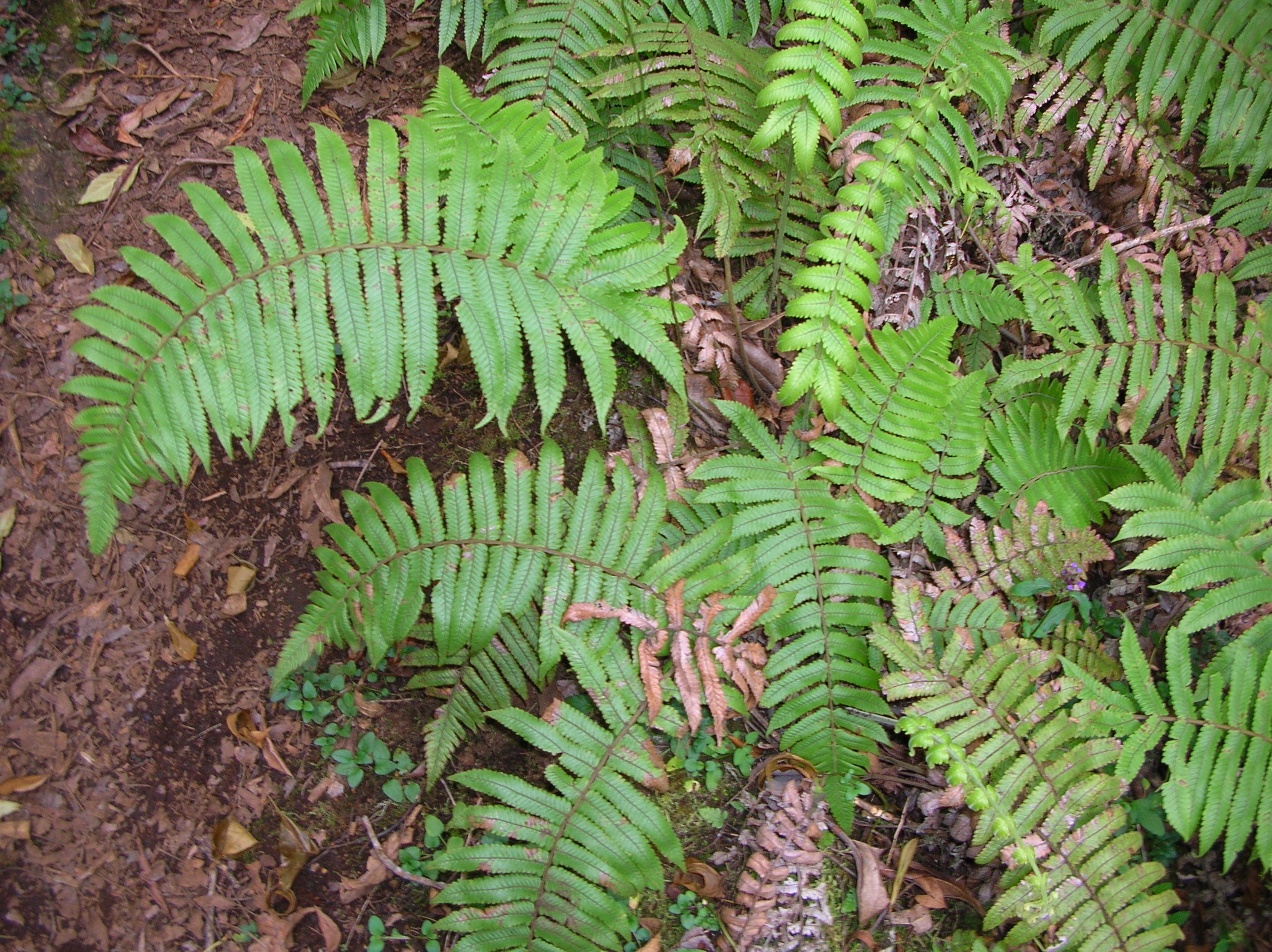
- Cyclosorus cyatheoides

Scientific classification
- Kingdom: Plantae
- Clade: Tracheophytes
- Division: Polypodiophyta
- Class: Polypodiopsida
- Order: Polypodiales
- Suborder: Aspleniineae
- Family: Thelypteridaceae; Ching ex Pic.Serm.

Genera
- See text

Synonyms
- Sphaerostephanaceae Ching 1940 nom. nud.

= Thelypteridaceae =

Marsh fern family Temporal range: Cenomanian–Recent

Family of ferns

Thelypteridaceae is a family of about 900 species of ferns in the order Polypodiales. In the Pteridophyte Phylogeny Group classification of 2016 (PPG I), it is placed in the suborder Aspleniineae. Alternatively, the family may be submerged in a very broadly defined family Aspleniaceae as the subfamily Thelypteridoideae.

The ferns are terrestrial, with the exception of a few which are lithophytes (grow on rocks). The bulk of the species are tropical, although there are a number of temperate species.

These ferns typically have creeping rhizomes. The fronds are simply pinnate to pinnate-pinnatifid. There is either no frond dimorphism or only mild dimorphism, either open venation or very simple anastomosing. The sori are mostly reniform in shape and have indusia, except for the Phegopteris group.

== Classification ==
During the early and mid 1900's all thelypterioid ferns were included in the genus Dryopteris because of the sorus shape. However, there are a great many differences between the groups, and these plants are now segregated in their own family. Genetic evidence shows that the family is clearly monophyletic.

=== Phylogenetic relationships ===
The following cladogram for the suborder Aspleniineae (as eupolypods II), based on Lehtonen (2011), and Rothfels & al. (2012), shows a likely phylogenetic relationship between the Thelypteridaceae and the other families of the clade.

- Aspleniineae (eupolypods II)
  - Cystopteridaceae
  - - - Rhachidosoraceae
      - - Diplaziopsidaceae
        - - Aspleniaceae
          - Hemidictyaceae
    - - Thelypteridaceae
      - - Woodsiaceae
        - - - Onocleaceae
            - Blechnaceae
          - Athyriaceae

=== Genera ===
The family can be divided into two major clades, which the Pteridophyte Phylogeny Group classification of 2016 (PPG I) recognizes as two subfamilies, Phegopteridoideae and Thelypteroideae. Their division into genera has been described as "highly controversial and fluctuating". The family includes several complexes of species that are difficult to distinguish, and seem to represent a remarkable evolutionary radiation. Some researchers include the entire family Thelypteridaceae in the genus Thelypteris; others divide the family into as many as 30 genera. An intermediate position is to place the bulk in Thelypteris (which can then be divided into subgenera and sections corresponding to the genera of other authors) but to separate out Phegopteris and Macrothelypteris. Another choice is to divide the family into a half a dozen or so genera.

Phylogeny of Thelypteriaceae

- - Phegopteridoideae
    - Macrothelypteris
    - - Phegopteris
      - Pseudophegopteris
  - Thelypteridoideae
    - - Thelypterideae
        Thelypteris
    - - - Amauropelteae
          - Coryphopteris
          - - Metathelypteris
            - Amauropelta
      - - - Oreopterideae
            Oreopteris
        - - Steiropteris
          - - Leptogrammeae
              - Cyclogramma
              - - Stegnogramma
                - Leptogramma
            - Meniscieae
              - Steiropteris species-group 2
              - - - Goniopteridinae
                    Goniopteris
                - - Menisciinae
                    - - Cyclosorus
                      - - Ampelopteris
                        - Mesophlebion
                    - Meniscium
                  - Pseudocyclosorinae
                    - Pelazoneuron
                    - - Pakau
                      - - Pelazoneuron species-group 2
                        - - Glaphyropteridopsis
                          - - - Grypothrix ramosii
                              - - Chingia
                                - - Plesioneuron
                                  - Menisciopsis
                            - - Grypothrix species-group 2
                              - - Mesopteris
                                - - Plesioneuron archboldiae
                                  - - Grypothrix
                                    - - Strophocaulon
                                      - - - - Pneumatopteris
                                            - Reholttumia
                                          - - Pronephrium
                                            - Sphaerostephanos
                                        - - - - Christella euphlebia
                                              - Trigonospora
                                            - Pseudocyclosorus
                                          - - - Amblovenatum
                                              - - Sphaerostephanos elatus
                                                - Abacopteris
                                            - Christella

The Pteridophyte Phylogeny Group classification of 2016 (PPG I) accepts 30 genera:

- Subfamily Phegopteridoideae Salino, A.R.Sm. & T.E.Almeid
  - Macrothelypteris (H.Ito) Ching
  - Phegopteris (C.Presl) Fée
  - Pseudophegopteris Ching
- Subfamily Thelypteridoideae C.F.Reed
  - Steiropteris (C.Chr.) Pic.Serm.
  - Tribe Thelypterideae Ching 1963
    - Thelypteris Schmidel
  - Tribe Amauropelteae Wei, Liu & Liu
    - Amauropelta Kunze
    - Coryphopteris Holttum
    - Metathelypteris (H.Ito) Ching
  - Tribe Oreopterideae Wei, Liu & Liu
    - Oreopteris Holub
  - Tribe Leptogrammeae Todaro 1866
    - Cyclogramma Tagawa
    - Leptogramma Smith
    - Stegnogramma Blume
  - Tribe Meniscieae Fée 1850-1852 ex Pfeiffer 1873
    - Subtribe Goniopteridinae Ching 1963
      - Goniopteris C.Presl
    - Subtribe Menisciinae Payer 1850
      - Ampelopteris Kunze
      - Cyclosorus Link
      - Meniscium Schreb.
      - Mesophlebion Holttum
    - Subtribe Pseudocyclosorinae Ching 1963
      - Abacopteris Fée
      - Amblovenatum J.P.Roux
      - Chingia Holttum
      - Christella H.Lév.
      - Glaphyropteridopsis Ching
      - Grypothrix (Holttum 1971) Fawcett & Smith
      - Menisciopsis (Holttum 1982) Fawcett & Smith
      - Menisorus Alston
      - Mesopteris Ching
      - Pakau Fawcett & Smith
      - Parathelypteris (H.Ito) Ching
      - Pelazoneuron (Holttum 1974) Smith & Fawcett
      - Plesioneuron (Holttum) Holttum
      - Pneumatopteris Nakai
      - Pronephrium C.Presl [Nannothelypteris Holttum]
      - Pseudocyclosorus Ching
      - Reholttumia Fawcett & Smith
      - Sphaerostephanos J.Sm.
      - Strophocaulon Fawcett & Smith
      - Trigonospora Holttum

Some species of Pronephrium were split off into other genera in 2021 as a result of a phylogenetic study of the family Thelypteridaceae:

- Abacopteris Fée
- Grypothrix (Holttum) S.E.Fawc. & A.R.Sm.
- Menisciopsis (Holttum) S.E.Fawc. & A.R.Sm

The extinct genus Holttumopteris from the Cenomanian aged Burmese amber has been suggested to have affinities with the family, but several important diagnostic characters are not preserved.
