= List of Canadian plants by family T =

Main page: List of Canadian plants by family

The following families of vascular plants are listed as occurring in Canada:

For mosses of Canada, see:

== Takakiaceae ==
- Takakia lepidozioides

== Taxaceae ==
- Taxus brevifolia — Pacific yew
- Taxus canadensis — Canadian yew

== Tetraphidaceae ==
- Tetraphis geniculata
- Tetraphis pellucida
- Tetrodontium brownianum — little Georgia
- Tetrodontium repandum

== Thamnobryaceae ==
- Porotrichum bigelovii
- Porotrichum vancouveriense
- Thamnobryum alleghaniense — Alleghany thamnobryum moss
- Thamnobryum neckeroides

== Theliaceae ==
- Thelia asprella
- Thelia hirtella

== Thelypteridaceae ==
- Coryphopteris simulata — bog fern
- Oreopteris quelpartensis — queen's-veil maidenfern
- Parathelypteris nevadensis — Sierra Nevada marsh fern
- Parathelypteris noveboracensis — New York fern
- Phegopteris connectilis — northern beech fern
- Phegopteris hexagonoptera — broad beech fern
- Thelypteris palustris — eastern marsh fern

== Thuidiaceae ==
- Abietinella abietina — abietinella moss
- Cyrto-hypnum minutulum
- Cyrto-hypnum pygmaeum
- Rauiella scita
- Thuidium delicatulum — delicate fern moss
- Thuidium philibertii
- Thuidium recognitum
- Thuidium tamariscinum

== Thymelaeaceae ==
- Dirca palustris — eastern leatherwood

== Tiliaceae ==
- Tilia americana — American basswood

== Timmiaceae ==
- Timmia austriaca
- Timmia megapolitana — warrior moss
- Timmia norvegica
- Timmia sibirica

== Treubiaceae ==
- Apotreubia nana

== Trichocoleaceae ==
- Trichocolea tomentella

== Typhaceae ==
- Typha angustifolia — narrowleaf cattail
- Typha latifolia — broadleaf cattail
- Typha x glauca — blue cattail
