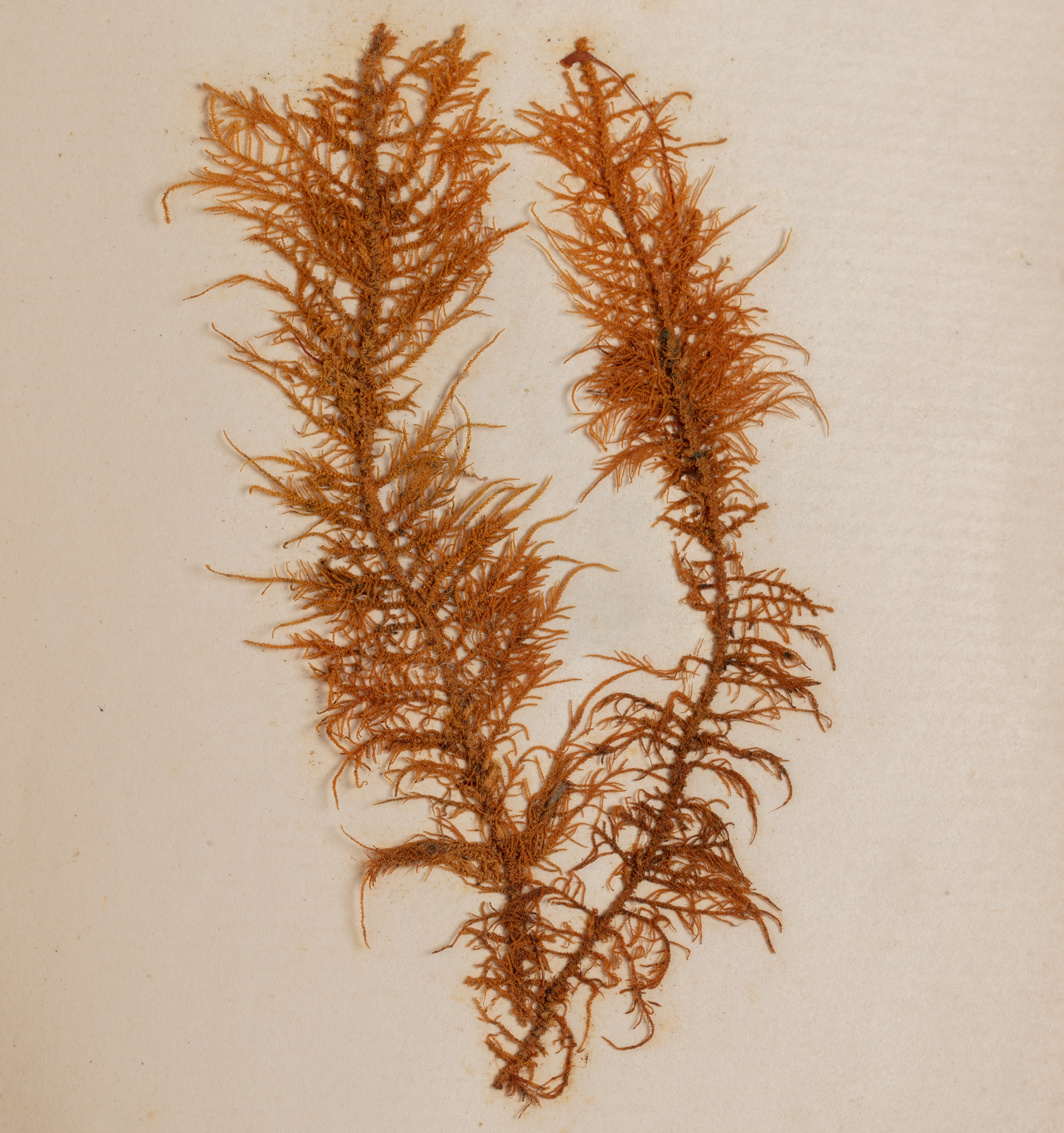

Scientific classification
- Kingdom: Plantae
- Division: Bryophyta
- Class: Bryopsida
- Subclass: Bryidae
- Order: Hypnales
- Family: Thuidiaceae
- Genus: Thuidiopsis
- Species: T. furfurosa

Binomial name
- Thuidiopsis furfurosa M.Fleisch.
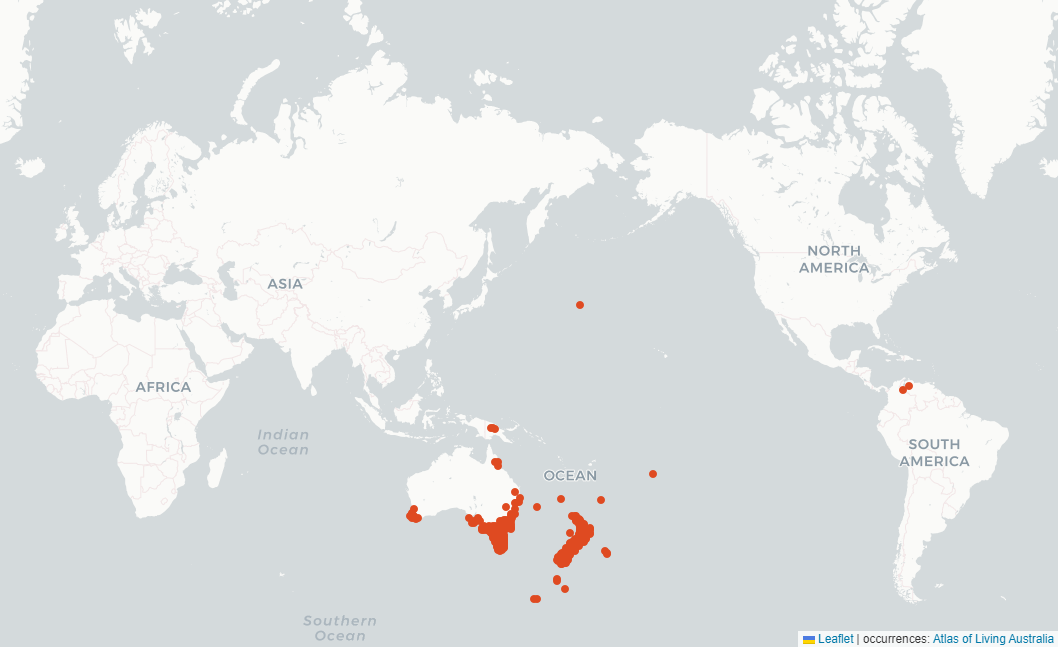

Synonyms
- Thuidium denticulosum (William Mitten) A.Jaeger; Thuidium furfurosum (Hook.f. & Wilson) Reichardt; Hypnum denticulosum Hook.f. & Wilson; Leskea fulvastra William Mitten(heterotypic); Hypnum furfurosum Hook.f. & Wilson

= Thuidiopsis furfurosa =

Species of moss

Thuidiopsis furfurosa, commonly known as furry thuidium, is a wide-ranging fern moss of the order Hypnales found in southern Australia, New Zealand, and a number of southern Oceania islands as far south as Macquarie Island.

== History ==
Furry thuidium was first described by the botanists Sir William Jackson Hooker and William M. Wilson in the Handbook New Zealand Flora in 1867 as Hypnum denticulosum. Numerous attempts to classify T. furfurosa occurred throughout the following years until it was finally reclassified in 1922 by the bryologist Richard Paul Max Fleischer as Thuidiopsis furfurosa in his major monograph Die Musci der Flora von Buitenzorg: zugleich Laubmoosflora von Java.

== Description ==
The dioecious gametophyte of this moss species showcases a diverse array of characteristics. These plants typically exhibit colours ranging from yellowish-green to dull green and feature bipinnate to indistinctly pinnate structures. The creeping stems of the moss species range from 12 to 25 cm (4.7 to 9.8 in) in length and commonly exhibit pinnate or bipinnate branching patterns measuring 1 to 1.5 cm (0.39 to 0.59 in) in length which form feathery fronds.

Notably, the scale-like leaves (small leafy appendages) are tall and prominent, while smaller branches near the bottom of the plant exhibit a loose, chain-like arrangement (catenulate) when dry. Stem leaves are predominantly triangular, with blunt or tipples at the top, narrowly triangular, or subulate, measuring up to 2 mm (0.08 in) long, while the leaves of smaller branches near the bottom of the plant have narrowly acute apices and measure 0.25 to 0.50 mm (0.01 to 0.02 in) long. The abaxial epidermal cells of the costa may be smooth or bear distal teeth, and median leaf cells typically display unipapillose characteristics, occasionally being 2- or 3-papillose, with predominantly tall, acute, and curved papillae. Inner perichaetial leaves are ciliate, and the moss forms compact to loose matts on various substrates such as soil, rocks, or wood.

During the reproductive phase, the sporophyte is distinctly present. Calyptrae are hooded (cucullate), either featuring hairs at the base or smooth, setae range in colour from red to orange, reaching lengths of 3 cm (1.2 in), and capsules are inclined to droop downwards from the point of attachment. Capsule shapes can present as narrowly ovoid, ellipsoid, oblong, or cylindrical, with dimensions of up to 2.5 to 3 mm (0.10 to 0.12 in) long, housing spores within.

The University of Auckland has an excellent collection of Thuidiopsis furfurosa images displaying its physical characteristics. Plants growing in very wet and shaded locations can produce irregular branching and a potential reduction of the number and size of small branched and scaly areas in between leaves (paraphyllia and pseudoparaphyllia). It exhibits two distinct chromosome counts, with one population having n=11 chromosomes and another population having n=22 chromosomes.

== Differentiation ==
Identifying Thuidiopsis furfurosa from similar species such as Thuidiopsis sparsa poses a significant challenge due to the considerable variability within each species. Visual distinctions, such as coloration or size, are unreliable markers for distinguishing Thuidiopsis mosses. Attempts to differentiate them based on traits such as size or branching patterns often yields inconclusive results due to the substantial variation observed within populations. Historical taxonomic records reveal a persistent confusion between T. sparsa and T. furfurosa, with differing opinions among taxonomists regarding their classification, including suggestions of uniting them or assigning varietal distinctions.Variants such as T. sparsa var. hastatum, which shares characteristics with both T. sparsa and T. furfurosa, can present challenges in differentiation.

However, meticulous attention to specific characteristics such as leaf morphology, habitat preferences, distribution, and the papillae on the leaves enables distinction between these species. A key distinguishing factor lies in the details of leaf papillae, particularly in their number and arrangement. This can be seen under microscopic investigation. In T. furfurosa, papillae are typically limited to 2-3 and are predominantly situated towards the base of the leaf, whereas in T. sparsa, they may be concentrated at the leaf tip or even absent altogether.

== Habitat and distribution ==
Thuidiopsis furfurosa exhibits a wide-ranging distribution, being found in various regions across Australia, including southern New South Wales, the Australian Capital Territory, Victoria, and Tasmania. It is widespread across most areas of New Zealand, it is also present on Norfolk Island, Macquarie Island, the Society Islands, Juan Fernandez Islands, Tristan da Cunha, Gough Island, and possibly in peninsular India. This moss typically inhabits moist shaded environments such as wet eucalypt (sclerophyll) forests, woodlands, rainforests, swamps, subalpine grasslands, and alongside creeks and streams. Occasionally, it forms large patches in grasslands and light bush, demonstrating its ability to adapt to a number environments and elevations, spanning from sea level to within the alpine zone with recorded occurrences up to approximately 1,600 meters (5,200 ft) above sea level in Victoria.
