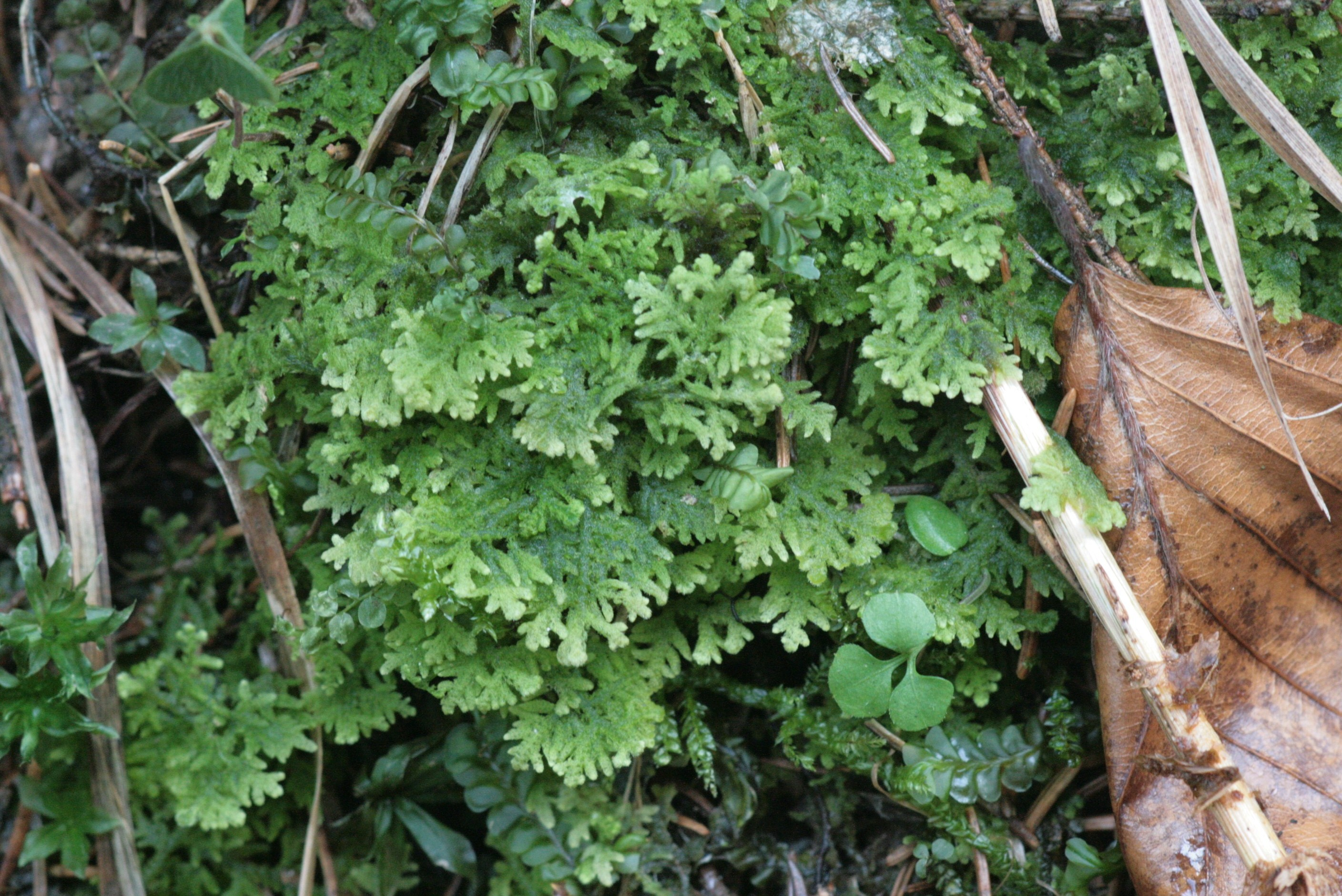

Conservation status
- Secure (NatureServe)

Scientific classification
- Kingdom: Plantae
- Division: Marchantiophyta
- Class: Jungermanniopsida
- Order: Lepidoziales
- Family: Trichocoleaceae
- Genus: Trichocolea
- Species: T. tomentella

Binomial name
- Trichocolea tomentella (Ehrh.) Dumort.

Synonyms
- Jungermannia tomentella Ehrh.; Trichocolea biddlecomiae Austin; Trichocolea tenera Udar & D.K. Singh; Jungermannia tomentella var. tomentella; Trichocolea tomentella f. tomentella; Trichocolea tomentella var. tomentella; Trichocolea tomentella var. europaea Gottsche & Rabenh.; Trichocolea tomentella f. nodulosa Nees; Trichocolea tomentella var. novae-zeelandiae Gottsche & Rabenh.; Trichocolea tomentella var. nodulosa (Nees) Debat

= Trichocolea tomentella =

Species of liverwort

Trichocolea tomentella is a species of liverwort belonging to the family Trichocoleaceae. It forms loose, pale green to yellowish-white mats and is characterised by its highly divided leaves that give it a feathery or fuzzy appearance. The species has a wide distribution across temperate regions of the Northern Hemisphere, particularly in oceanic and suboceanic areas, occurring in Europe, Asia, North Africa, and eastern North America. It typically grows in moist, shaded locations, especially near springs and streams in deciduous and coniferous forests. While capable of sexual reproduction, with male and female structures on separate plants, it reproduces predominantly through vegetative means via branching and fragmentation. The species shows considerable morphological variation between populations but maintains stable taxonomic characteristics in its cell structure. Though it can form extensive pure patches and effectively compete with other bryophytes in suitable habitats, T. tomentella faces threats from habitat destruction, particularly through logging and drainage of its preferred moist forest habitats.

== Taxonomy ==
Trichocolea tomentella was first documented in 1700 by Joseph Pitton de Tournefort under the name Muscus palustris absinthii folio insipidus. In 1783, Jakob Friedrich Ehrhart recognised it as distinct from Jungermannia ciliaris and named it Jungermannia tomentella. The genus Trichocolea was proposed by Barthélemy Charles Joseph Dumortier in 1822 (initially spelled as Thricholea) to accommodate this species and T. tomentosa. After several spelling variations, Christian Gottfried Daniel Nees von Esenbeck standardised the spelling to Trichocolea in 1838, which was later conserved as the official genus name.

The species shows considerable morphological variation between populations, particularly in growth form, plant size, branching frequency, stem thickness, density of stem paraphyllia (small leaf-like structures), and leaf characteristics. Plants growing in very wet, shaded habitats often have a more ascending habit, smaller size, and sparser branches compared to those in merely humid conditions, which tend to grow prostrate and form more compact mats with denser branching. However, certain characteristics remain stable and taxonomically significant, including the thin-walled leaf cells, the striate-verrucose to weakly papillate-verrucose surface of the cilia (hair-like projections), and non-dilated septa between cells.

Molecular phylogenetics studies based on rbcL gene sequences have revealed that populations of T. tomentella show different DNA haplotype patterns between European and Southeast Asian populations. European populations show genetic homogeneity across their range, while Southeast Asian populations exhibit three distinct haplotypes. This greater genetic diversity in Asian populations suggests that the species may have originated in Southeast Asia before spreading to Europe, as ancestral populations typically show higher genetic diversity than more recently established ones.

== Description ==
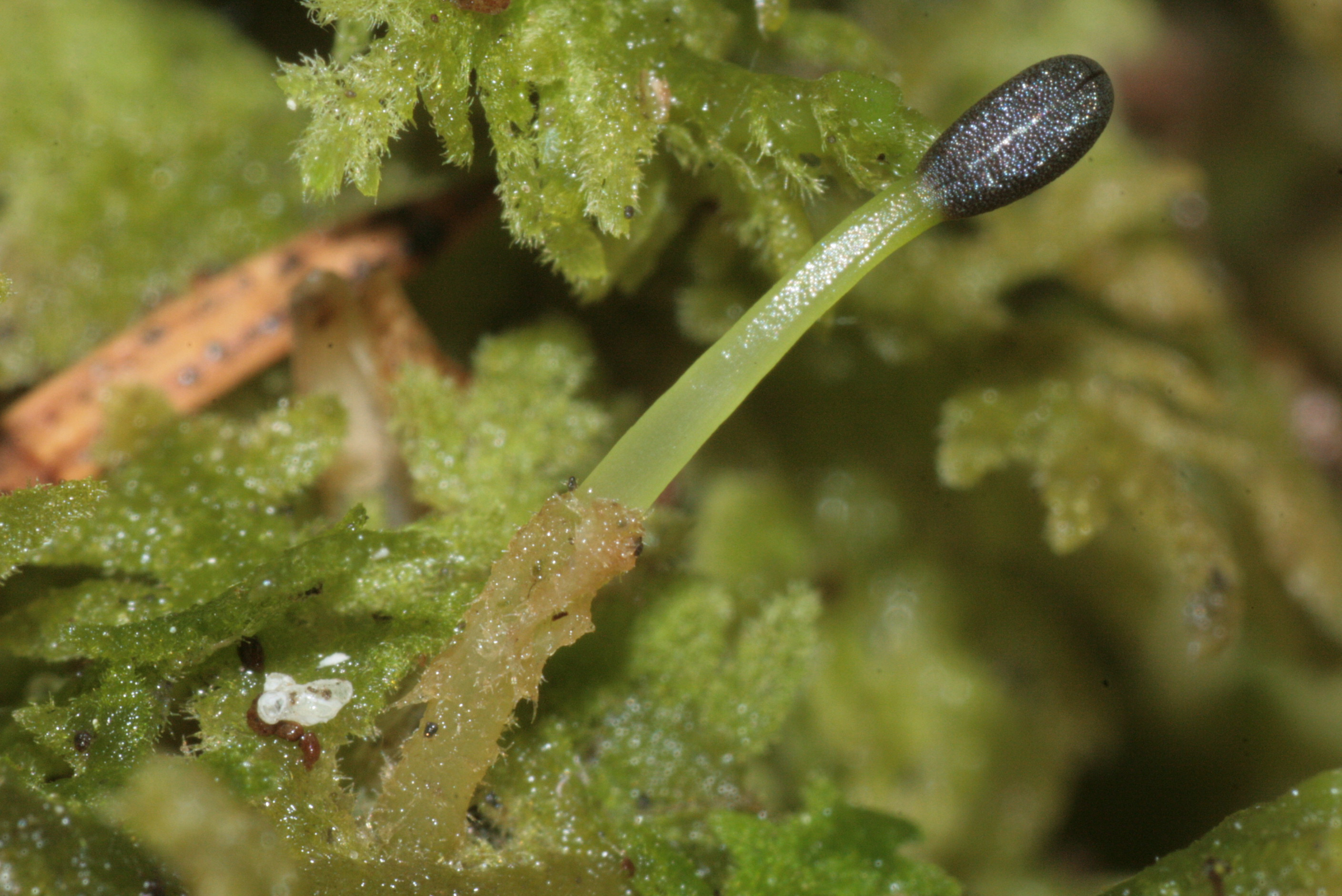
Stalk bearing a narrow, dark spore capsule

Trichocolea tomentella is a distinctive liverwort that forms loose, pale green to yellowish-white mats. Individual plants grow to 2–4 cm (0.79–1.57 in) in length and have a characteristic feathery or fuzzy appearance due to their highly divided leaves.

The plant grows in a branching pattern, with the main stem producing regular side branches that themselves branch two to three times, creating a fern-like appearance. The main stem is relatively robust, measuring about half a millimetre in width, and is covered with tiny leaf-like structures called paraphyllia.

The leaves are divided into 6–8 delicate finger-like segments, giving the plant its characteristic fuzzy texture. These segments are made up of elongated cells containing 4–8 oil bodies - small organelles that are characteristic of liverworts. Unlike many other liverworts, T. tomentella rarely produces root-like structures (rhizoids).

The species is dioicous, meaning male and female reproductive structures occur on separate plants. The male structures (androecia) grow along the main stem, while the female structures (gynoecia) develop into a club-shaped structure covered in small leaves. When fertilisation occurs, this develops into a long stalk bearing a narrow, dark brown to black spore capsule. However, sexual reproduction is rare in many parts of its range, with the plant primarily spreading through vegetative growth. The spores, when produced, are reddish-brown and very small, measuring just 10–14 μm (0.010–0.014 mm) in diameter.

The plant's distinctive appearance, particularly its pale colour and highly divided leaves, makes it relatively easy to identify even for novice botanists.

== Habitat, distribution, and ecology ==
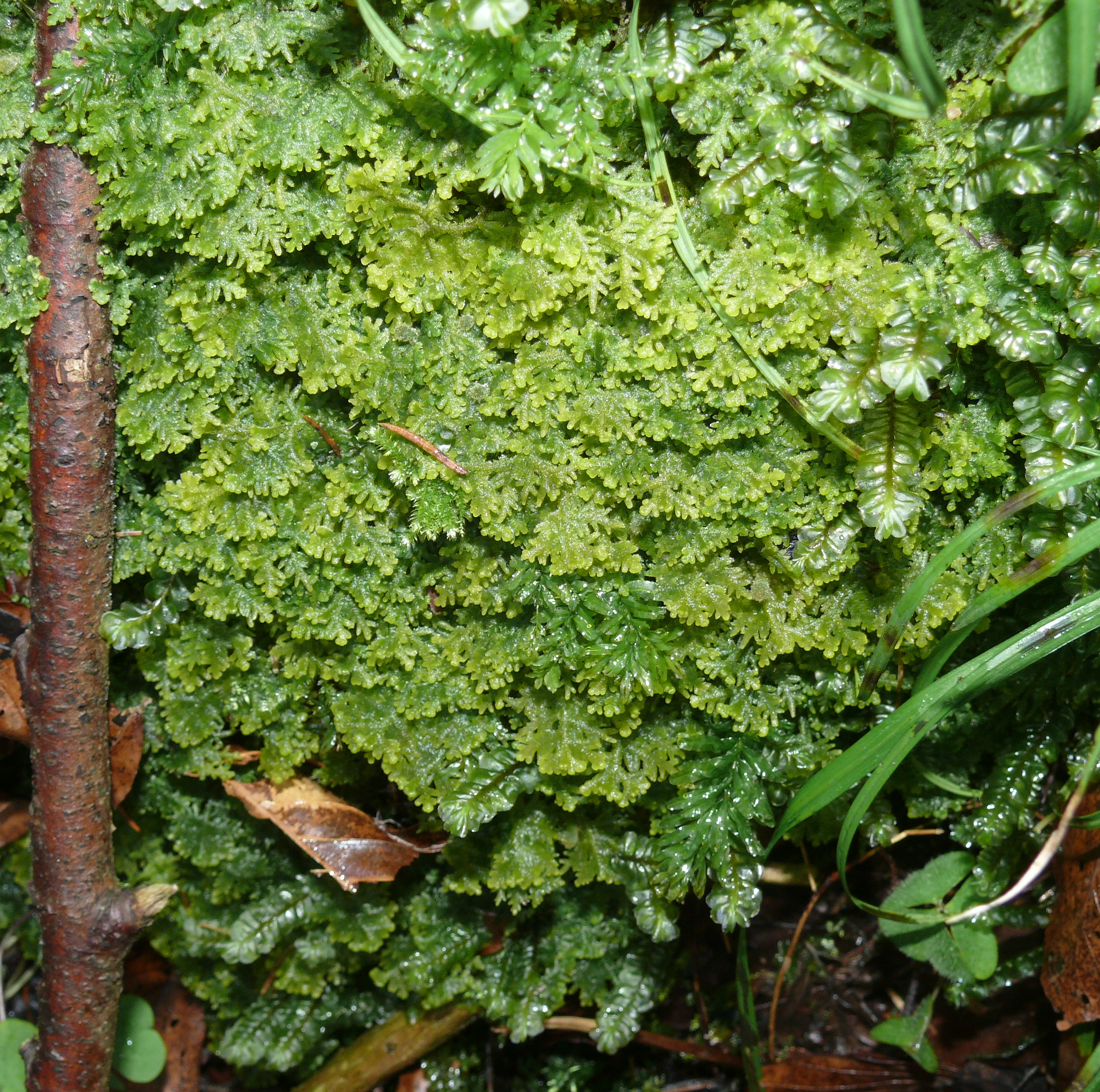
In the Swabian-Franconian Forest, Germany

Trichocolea tomentella has a wide distribution across temperate regions of the Northern Hemisphere, particularly in oceanic and suboceanic areas. Its range extends from northern Portugal and Spain northwards to southern Norway, Sweden and Finland, and from Ireland and Great Britain eastward to western Russia. The species is also found in Asia, North Africa and eastern North America.

The species typically grows in moist, well-shaded locations, with a particular preference for deciduous forest habitats. It is frequently found near springs, streams and gullies where there is a constant water supply and moderately diffuse light. In western Norway, it occurs in two distinct habitat types: Alnus glutinosa forests with Carex remota understory, and on poorer mineral soils in narrow river gorges dominated by either Betula pubescens or ferns. In other regions, it can be found in coniferous swamp forests.

Trichocolea tomentella can form extensive pure patches covering up to 75 m^{2} (810 sq ft), though it often grows mixed with other bryophytes. Common associate species include Brachythecium rivulare, Thuidium tamariscinum, Calliergonella cuspidata, and various species of Rhytidiadelphus. The species reproduces predominantly through asexual means via clonal regeneration and branching, with sexual reproduction (sporophyte production) being rare in much of Europe, though more common in eastern North America. Its dispersal ability appears to be limited, particularly in areas where it reproduces only asexually, though it may occasionally spread through water, mammals, or birds carrying detached shoot fragments.

The species faces threats from habitat destruction, particularly through logging and drainage of its preferred moist forest habitats. These activities can create drier, more exposed conditions unsuitable for the species' survival.

Trichocolea tomentella shows high clonal persistence in undisturbed habitats, with individual plants reproducing primarily through vegetative means via branching and fragmentation rather than sexually through spores. Studies have shown the species maintains relatively high genetic diversity within populations despite limited sexual reproduction, likely due to long-term accumulation of genetic variants through somatic mutations and occasional recruitment. The species grows in dense colonies that can effectively exclude other bryophytes – as T. tomentella shoot density increases, the presence of other bryophyte species decreases significantly. Gene flow between populations appears to be limited even at small spatial scales (1 km), suggesting the species has restricted dispersal abilities. This combination of traits – clonal persistence, competitive ability in suitable microsites, but limited dispersal – makes the species vulnerable to habitat fragmentation while also allowing it to maintain stable populations in undisturbed conditions.

Penicillium concentricum is an endophytic fungus that associates with Trichocolea tomentella and that produces several biologically active secondary metabolites.
