= Leiomitra julacea =

Scientific classification
- Kingdom: Plantae
- Division: Marchantiophyta
- Class: Jungermanniopsida
- Order: Lepidoziales
- Family: Trichocoleaceae
- Genus: Leiomitra
- Species: L. julacea

Binomial name
- Leiomitra julacea Hatcher ex J.J. Engel

Synonyms
- Castanoclobos julaceus (Hatcher ex J.J. Engel) J.J. Engel & Glenny; Trichocolea julacea Hatcher invalid because no type given

Species of liverwort

Leiomitra julacea is a species of liverwort endemic to New Zealand. It is known only from Stewart Island and from the southern West Coast Region of the South Island. It occurs in rocky outcrops at elevations of approximately 130 m.

Leiomitra julacea is a spongy plant appearing like a mass of interwoven cilia. It is creeping plant, chocolate brown, with shoots up to 2 mm wide. Leaves spread widely but with the lobes arching sharply toward the shoot apex. Leaf disc 5-6 cells high. The only other species of Leiomitra found in New Zealand, L. lanata, is yellow-green with the disc 6-10 cells high.
