= Cyrto-hypnum minutulum =

Scientific classification
- Kingdom: Plantae
- Division: Bryophyta
- Class: Bryopsida
- Subclass: Bryidae
- Order: Hypnales
- Family: Thuidiaceae
- Genus: Cyrto-hypnum
- Species: C. minutulum

Binomial name
- Cyrto-hypnum minutulum (Hedw.) W.R.Buck & H.A.Crum

Species of moss

Cyrto-hypnum minutulum is a species of moss belonging to the family Thuidiaceae.

Synonym:

- Hypnum eccremocarpum Müll. Hal.
- Hypnum schiedeanum Müll. Hal.
- Thuidium exasperatum Mitt.
- Thuidium glaucescens Schimp. ex Besch.
- Thuidium minutulum (Hedw.) Schimp.
- Thuidium tuerckheimii Müll. Hal.
- Thuidium tuerckheimii var. angustatum Cardot
- Thuidium wrightii A. Jaeger
