= Abietinella =

Abietinella may refer to:

- Abietinella (cnidarian), a genus of hydrozoans in the family Zygophylacidae
- Abietinella (plant), a genus of plants in the family Thuidiaceae
