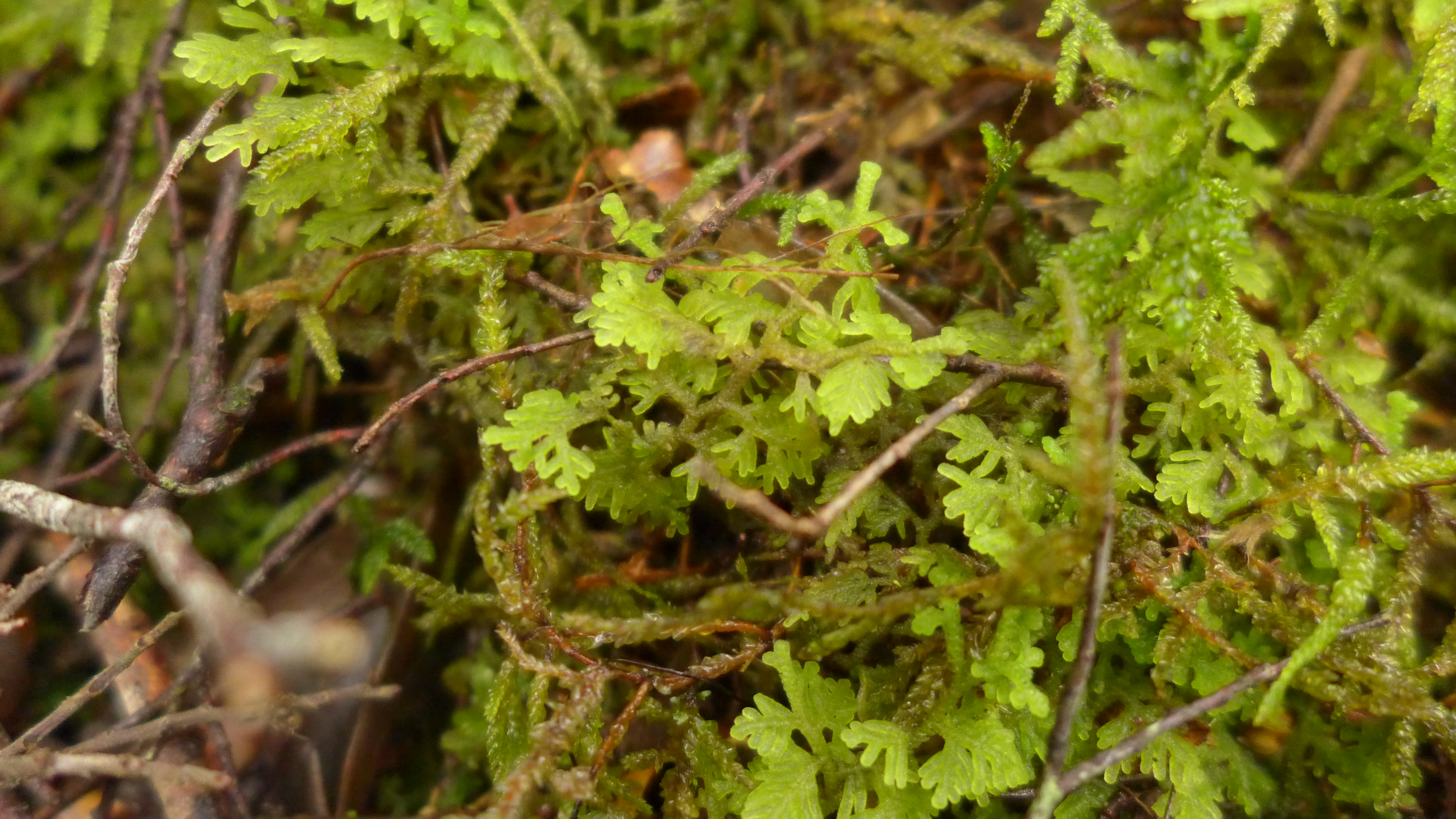
- Picture of Trichocolea mollissima, Creepy Crawley Nature Trail, Tasmania

Scientific classification
- Kingdom: Plantae
- Division: Marchantiophyta
- Class: Jungermanniopsida
- Order: Lepidoziales
- Family: Trichocoleaceae
- Genus: Trichocolea
- Species: T. mollissima

Binomial name
- Trichocolea mollissima Hatcher

= Trichocolea mollissima =

Species of liverwort

Trichocolea mollissima (woolly worm) is a large liverwort of the Trichocoleaceae family. It is found commonly throughout wet sclerophyll and rainforests in Australia and New Zealand. In Australia it is present in Tasmania, Victoria, New South Wales and Queensland. It also occurs extensively on the north island of New Zealand. Its most distinctive feature is its highly divided, densely arranged and extremely small leaves, which lend it a woolly appearance; hence its common name “woolly worm”. It usually grows in a matted or tufted habit on the ground and lower trunks of trees, and exhibits a preference for decaying wood and deep shade. On casual observance, its leaf arrangement and growth habit resemble that of a large moss. Its stems are commonly 3–6 cm long, with leaves up to 0.6mm wide, with up to 3-3 divisions. leaves and stems are arranged in bi-pinnate (rarely tri-pinnate) form. It is commonly coloured pale-yellow-green, which fades to white or blue-green upon desiccation in drier conditions.

Trichocolea mollissima closely resembles another Trichocoleaceae species found in southern Australia, T. rigida. Inspection of the cell form under a microscope is usually required to distinguish the two. Where the cell form of T. rigid is thin-walled and minimally tapered, the cells of T. mollissima are highly tapered and possess thick walls. Another distinction between the two species is T. rigid as comparative scarcity and preference for drier, sclerophyll habitats. The two species are also known to hybridise however, and examples of specimens possessing characteristics of both species have been documented.

The extent of T. mollissimas distribution and its prevalence throughout forests within its range suggest that its future as a species is secure.
