= Eotrichocolea =

Scientific classification
- Kingdom: Plantae
- Division: Marchantiophyta
- Class: Jungermanniopsida
- Order: Lepidoziales
- Family: Trichocoleaceae
- Genus: Eotrichocolea; R.M.Schust.

Genus of liverworts

Eotrichocolea is a genus of liverworts belonging to the family Trichocoleaceae.

The species of this genus are found in Australia and New Zealand.

Species:

- Eotrichocolea furukii T.Katag.
- Eotrichocolea polyacantha (Hook.f. & Taylor) R.M.Schust.
