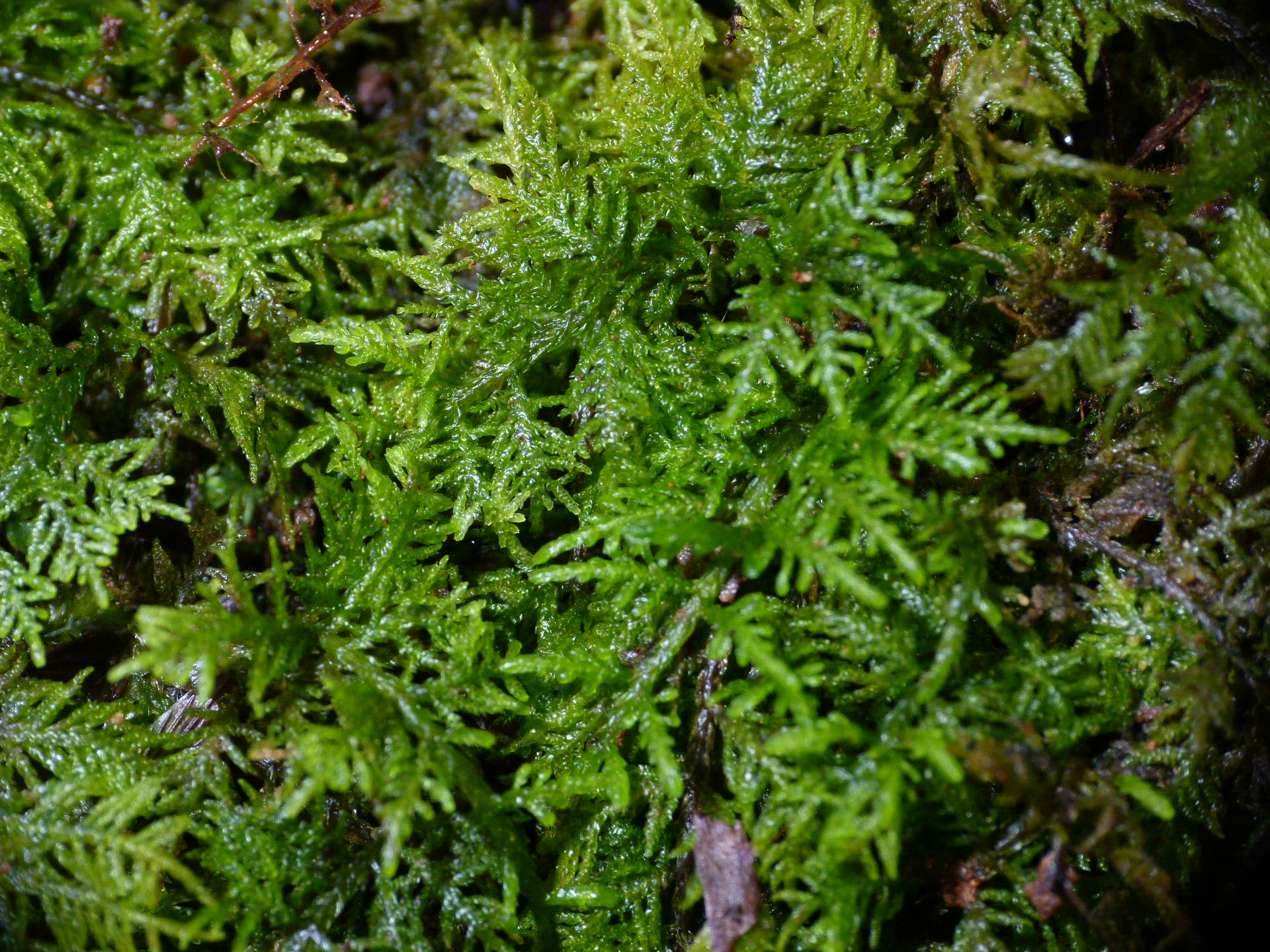
- Pelekium gratum

Scientific classification
- Kingdom: Plantae
- Division: Bryophyta
- Class: Bryopsida
- Subclass: Bryidae
- Order: Hypnales
- Family: Thuidiaceae
- Genus: Pelekium; Mitt.

Synonyms
- Pelecium I.Hagen, 1910

= Pelekium =

Genus of mosses

Pelekium is a genus of mosses belonging to the family Thuidiaceae.

The genus has cosmopolitan distribution.

== Species ==
As accepted by GBIF;

- Pelekium atlanticum (Hedenäs) Hedenäs
- Pelekium bifarium (Bosch & Sande Lac.) M.Fleisch.
- Pelekium bonianum Touw, 2001
- Pelekium campanulatum Touw, 2001
- Pelekium chenagonii Touw, 2001
- Pelekium ciliatum Touw, 2001
- Pelekium contortulum Touw, 2001
- Pelekium erosifolium Touw, 2001
- Pelekium fuscatum Touw, 2001
- Pelekium gratum Touw, 2001
- Pelekium intricatum Touw, 2001
- Pelekium investe Touw, 2001
- Pelekium involvens Touw, 2001
- Pelekium leptocladum Touw, 2001
- Pelekium longirostre (Hampe) A.Jaeger
- Pelekium mexicanum (Mitt.) Schiavone & G.M.Suarez
- Pelekium microphyllum T.Koponen & Touw, 2003
- Pelekium minusculum Touw, 2001
- Pelekium minutulum Touw, 2001
- Pelekium muricatulum Touw, 2001
- Pelekium pygmaeum Touw, 2001
- Pelekium ramosissimum Touw, 2001
- Pelekium ramusculosum Touw, 2001
- Pelekium scabrosulum Touw, 2001
- Pelekium schistocalyx Touw, 2001
- Pelekium sharpii (H.A.Crum) G.M.Suarez & Schiavone
- Pelekium siphotheca Touw, 2001
- Pelekium sparsum (Hook.f. & Wilson) A.E.R.Soares, Câmara & P.E.A.S.
- Pelekium subbifarium (Brotherus) Brotherus, 1925
- Pelekium subpinnatum Touw, 2001
- Pelekium synoicum Touw, 2001
- Pelekium trachypodum (Mitt.) Müll.Hal.
- Pelekium varians Touw, 2001
- Pelekium velatum Mitten, 1868
- Pelekium versicolor Touw, 2001
- Pelekium watanabei Touw, 2001
