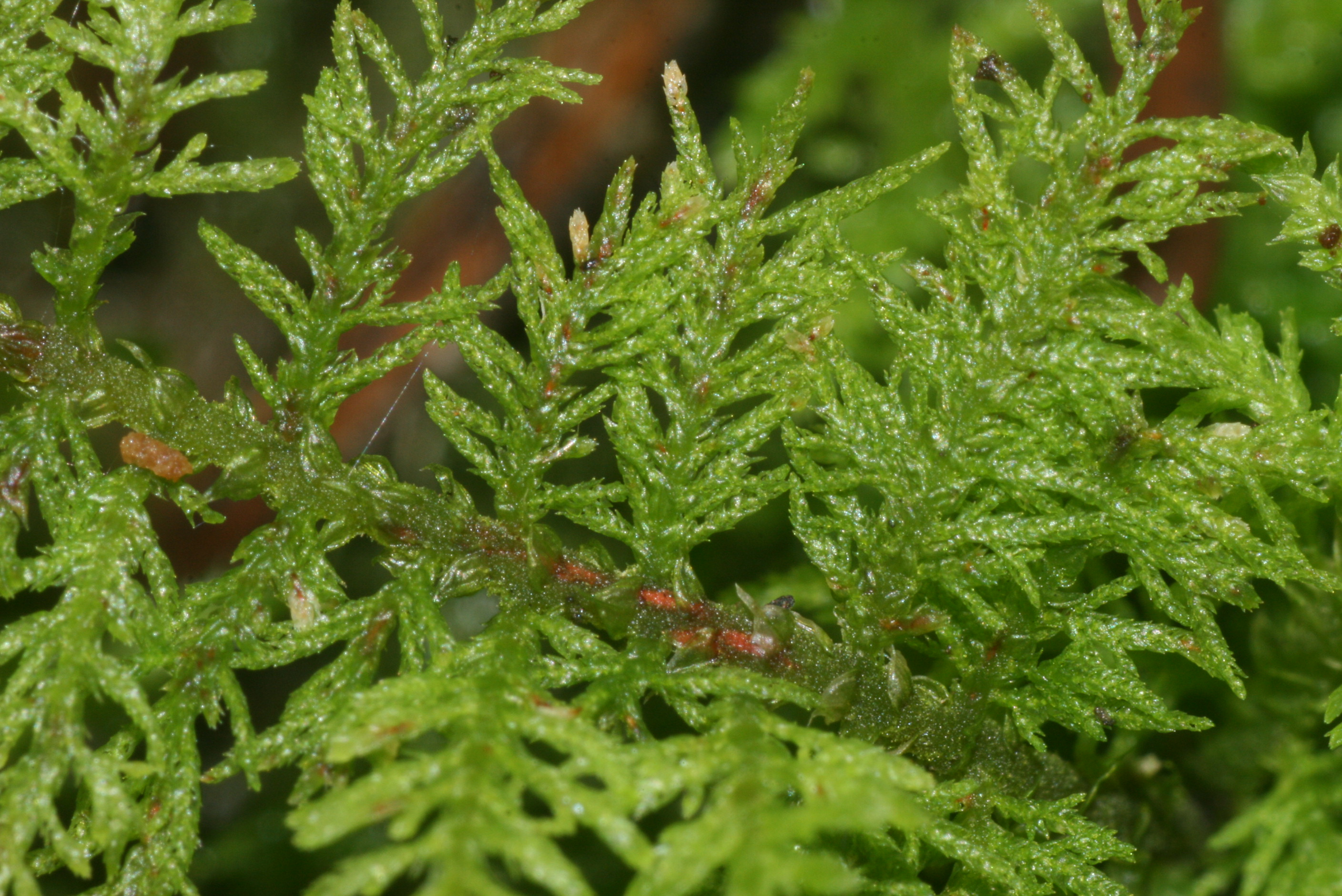

Scientific classification
- Kingdom: Plantae
- Division: Bryophyta
- Class: Bryopsida
- Subclass: Bryidae
- Order: Hypnales
- Family: Thuidiaceae
- Genus: Thuidium
- Species: T. delicatulum

Binomial name
- Thuidium delicatulum (Hedw.) Schimp.

Synonyms
- Hypnum delicatulum Hedwig, 1801; Thuidium recognitum var. delicatulum (Hedwig) Warnstorf; Leskea assimilis Mitt.; Tamariscella ventrifolia Müll. Hal.; Thuidium erectum Duby; Thuidium schlumbergeri Schimp. ex Besch.; Thuidium subrobustum Cardot

= Thuidium delicatulum =

Species of moss

Thuidium delicatulum, also known as the delicate fern moss or common fern moss, is a widespread species of moss in the family Thuidiaceae. It is found in North and South America from Alaska to Brazil.
