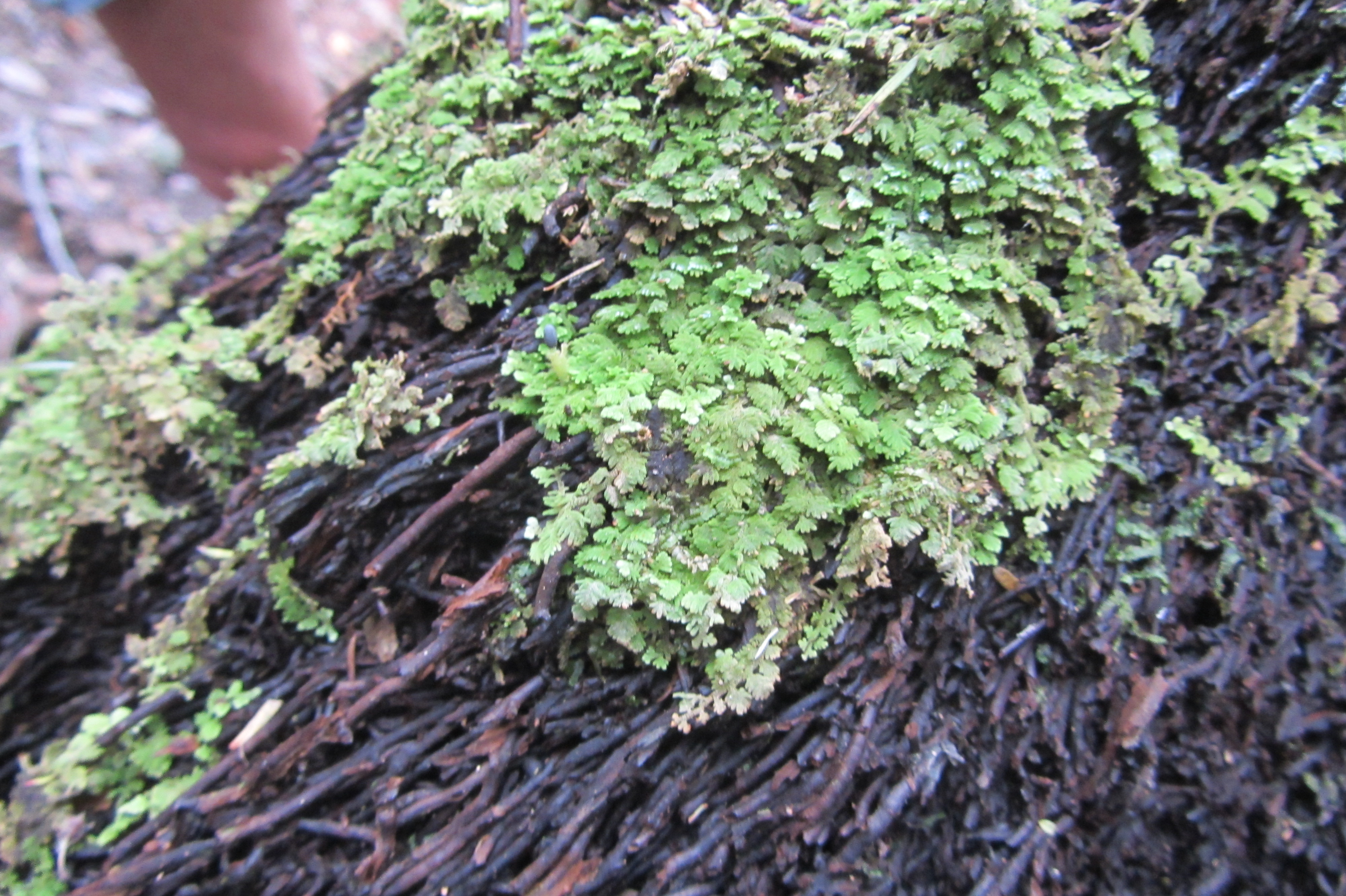
- Trichocolea rigida

Scientific classification
- Kingdom: Plantae
- Division: Marchantiophyta
- Class: Jungermanniopsida
- Order: Lepidoziales
- Family: Trichocoleaceae
- Genus: Trichocolea; Dumort.

Synonyms
- Thricolea Dumortier, 1831; Tricholea Dumortier, 1835; Tricolea Dumortier, 1831

= Trichocolea =

Genus of liverworts

Trichocolea is a genus of liverworts belonging to the family Trichocoleaceae.

The species of this genus are found in Eurasia and Australia.

== Species ==
As accepted by GBIF;

- Trichocolea allionii Stephani
- Trichocolea biddlecomiae Austin
- Trichocolea brevifissa Steph.
- Trichocolea decrescens Stephani
- Trichocolea difficilis Steph.
- Trichocolea elegans Lehm.
- Trichocolea filicaulis Steph.
- Trichocolea floccosa Herzog & Hatcher
- Trichocolea gracillima Austin
- Trichocolea hatcheri E.A.Hodgs.
- Trichocolea herzogii Steph.
- Trichocolea indica Udar & D.K.Singh
- Trichocolea iriomotensis T.Katag.
- Trichocolea japonica T.Katag.
- Trichocolea magna T.Katag.
- Trichocolea mexicana Stephani
- Trichocolea minutifolia Steph.
- Trichocolea mollissima Hatcher
- Trichocolea novaezelandiae R.M.Schust.
- Trichocolea obconica Stephani
- Trichocolea paupercula Steph.
- Trichocolea pluma Dumort.
- Trichocolea rigida R.M.Schust.
- Trichocolea rudimentaris Steph.
- Trichocolea sprucei Steph.
- Trichocolea tenera Udar & D.K.Singh
- Trichocolea tomentella (Ehrh.) Dumort.
- Trichocolea udarii D.K.Singh
- Trichocolea uleana Stephani
- Trichocolea verticillata Stephani
- Trichocolea wattsiana Steph.
