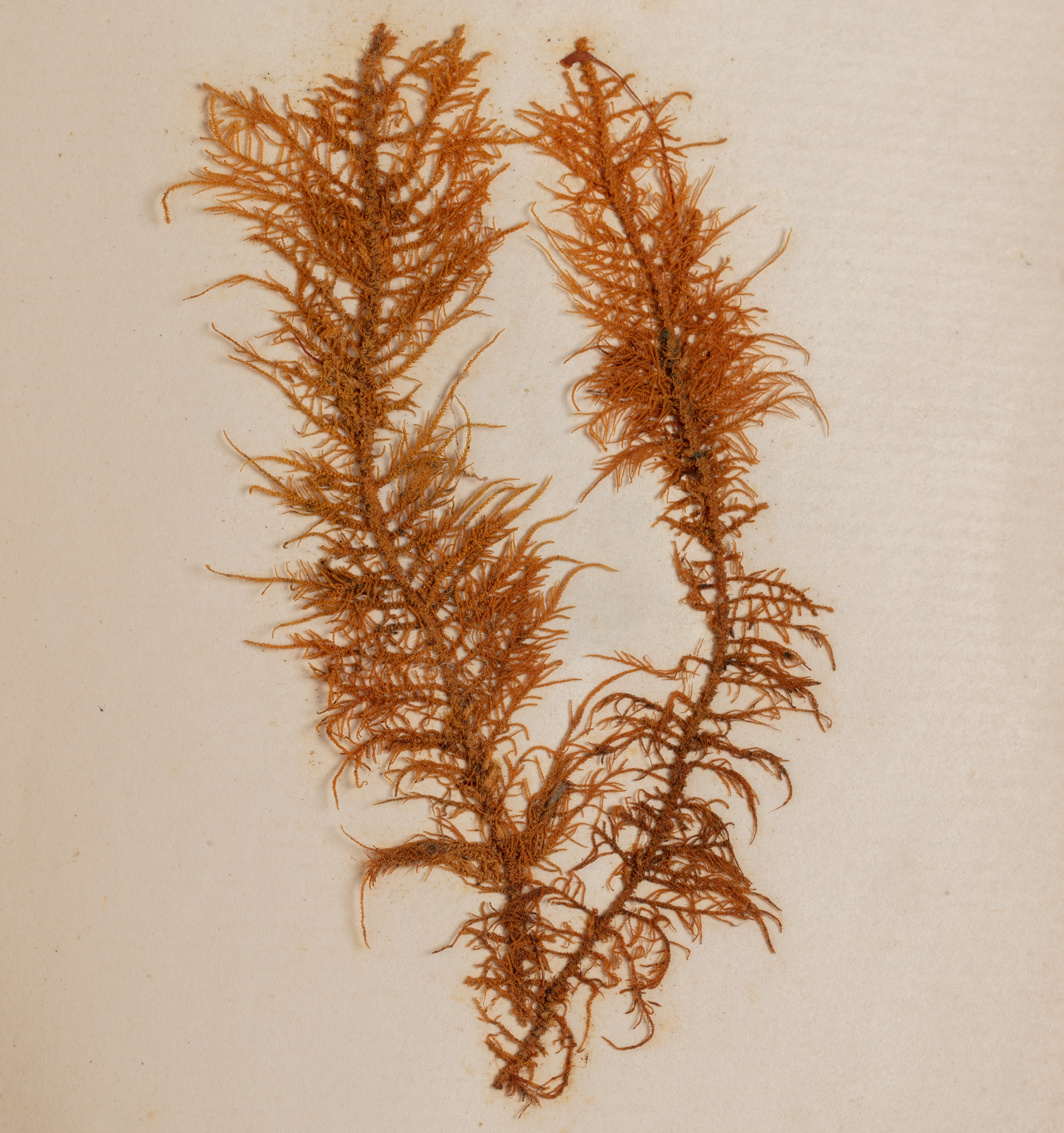
- Thuidiopsis furfurosa

Scientific classification
- Kingdom: Plantae
- Division: Bryophyta
- Class: Bryopsida
- Subclass: Bryidae
- Order: Hypnales
- Family: Thuidiaceae
- Genus: Thuidiopsis; M.Fleisch.

= Thuidiopsis =

Genus of mosses

Thuidiopsis is a genus of mosses belonging to the family Thuidiaceae.

The species of this genus are found in Australia and South America.

== Species ==
As accepted by GBIF:

- Thuidiopsis chilensis Brotherus, 1925
- Thuidiopsis crispatula (Cardot) M.Fleisch.
- Thuidiopsis denticulosa (Mitt.) Broth.
- Thuidiopsis dusenii Brotherus, 1925
- Thuidiopsis francii (Thér.) Broth.
- Thuidiopsis fulvastra (Mitt.) Broth.
- Thuidiopsis furfurosa Fleischer, 1923
- Thuidiopsis masafuerae (Broth.) Broth.
- Thuidiopsis neocaledonica (Thér.) Broth.
- Thuidiopsis sparsa Brotherus, 1925
- Thuidiopsis strictula (Cardot) Broth.
- Thuidiopsis stuartii (Müll.Hal.) Broth.
- Thuidiopsis suberecta (Hampe) Broth.
- Thuidiopsis tsunodae (Broth. ex Iisiba) Broth.
- Thuidiopsis valdiviae (Broth.) Broth.
