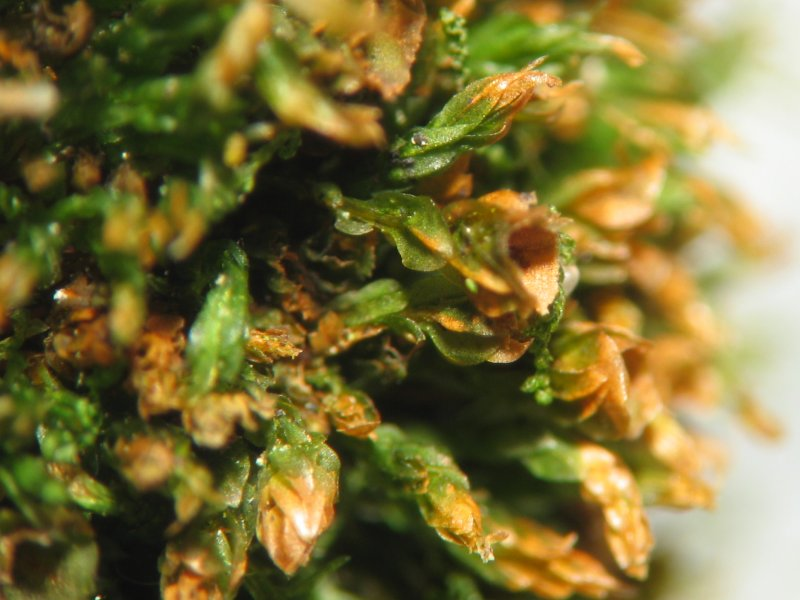
- Tetraphis pellucida

Scientific classification
- Kingdom: Plantae
- Clade: Embryophytes
- Division: Bryophyta
- Class: Tetraphidopsida
- Order: Tetraphidales
- Family: Tetraphidaceae
- Genus: Tetraphis; Hedw.

Species
- Tetraphis geniculata; Tetraphis pellucida

Synonyms
- Georgia Müller Hal.

= Tetraphis =

Genus of mosses

Tetraphis is a genus of two species of mosses (Bryophyta). Its name refers to its four large peristome teeth.

== Reproduction ==
The sex of Tetraphis shoots can transform depending on the shoot density. When a colony is sparse female—gemmae-producing—shoots dominate. When the colony is sufficiently dense they transform into male shoots.

This density-dependent sexual reproduction strategy is common in fish but Tetraphis is the first moss in which this has been documented.
