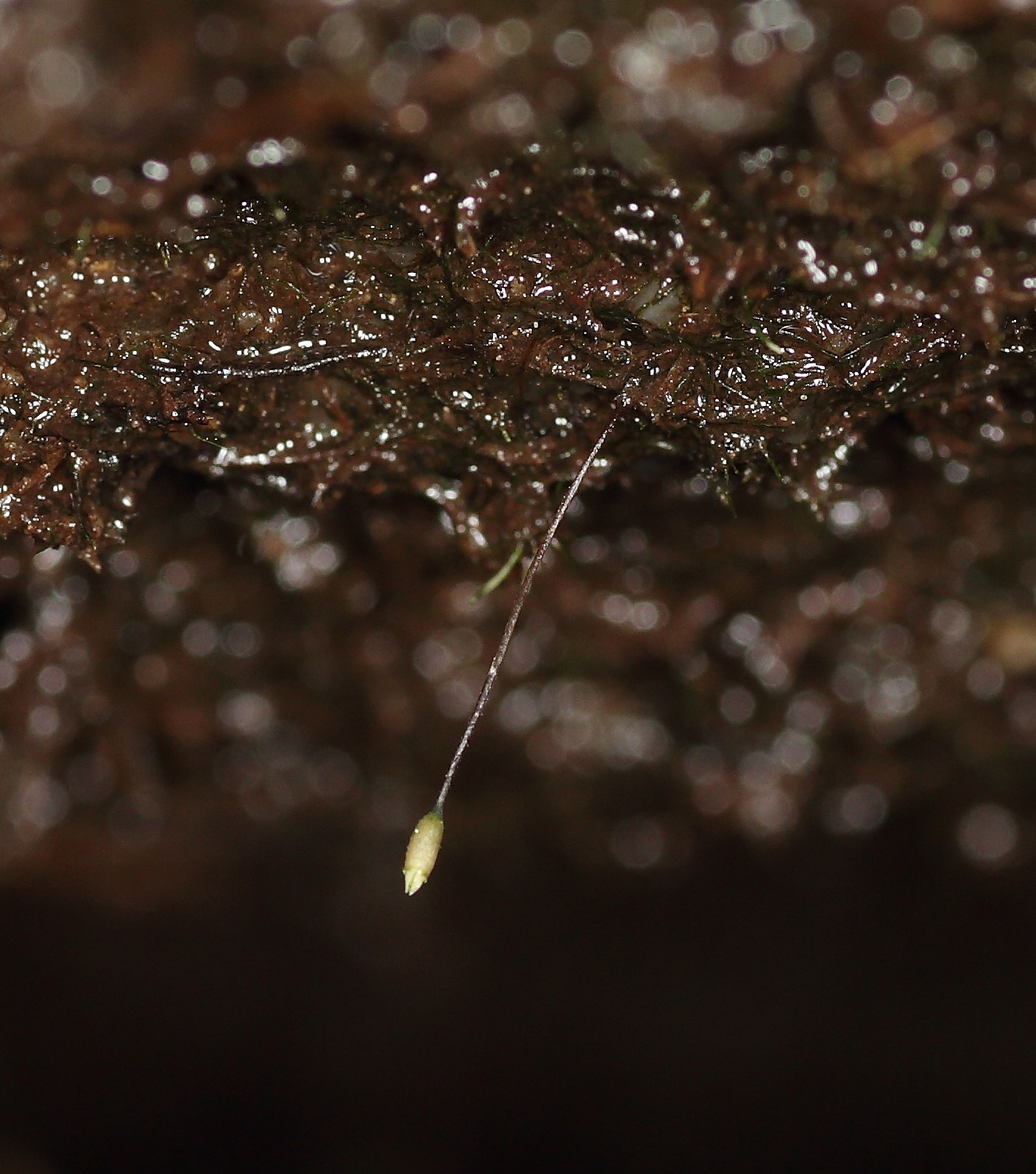
- Tetrodontium brownianum

Scientific classification
- Kingdom: Plantae
- Division: Bryophyta
- Class: Tetraphidopsida
- Order: Tetraphidales
- Family: Tetraphidaceae
- Genus: Tetrodontium; Schwägr.

Species
- Tetrodontium brownianum; Tetrodontium repandum

= Tetrodontium =

Genus of mosses

Tetrodontium is a genus of two species of moss (Bryophyta). Its name refers to its four large peristome teeth.
