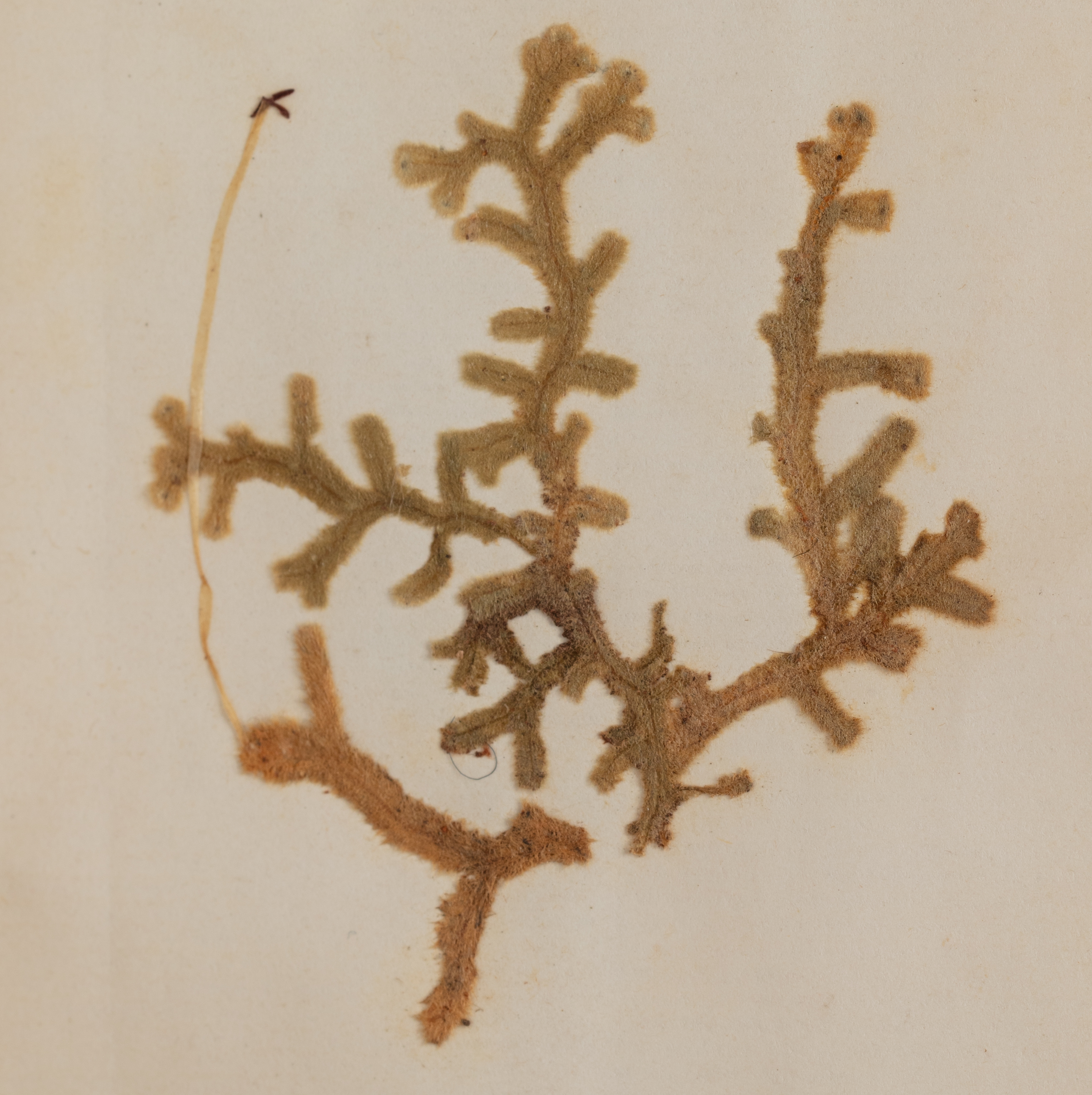
- Leiomitra lanata

Scientific classification
- Kingdom: Plantae
- Division: Marchantiophyta
- Class: Jungermanniopsida
- Order: Lepidoziales
- Family: Trichocoleaceae
- Genus: Leiomitra; Lindb.

= Leiomitra =

Genus of liverworts

Leiomitra is a genus of liverworts in the family Trichocoleaceae.

Species from the genus can be found in Central America, southern America, parts of eastern Asia and Australasia.

== Species ==
As accepted by GBIF;

- Leiomitra argentea (Herzog) T.Katag.
- Leiomitra breviseta (Steph.) R.M.Schust.
- Leiomitra capillata Lindb.
- Leiomitra elegans (Lehm.) Hässel de Menéndez
- Leiomitra elliottii (Steph.) R.M.Schust.
- Leiomitra flaccida Spruce
- Leiomitra hirticaulis R.M. Schust.
- Leiomitra julacea Hatcher ex J.J. Engel
- Leiomitra lanata (Hook.) R.M. Schust.
- Leiomitra mastigophoroides R.M. Schust.
- Leiomitra merrillana (Steph.) T.Katag.
- Leiomitra paraphyllina Spruce
- Leiomitra paraphyllina Spruce
- Leiomitra robusta (Steph.) R.M.Schust.
- Leiomitra smaragdina Hässel de Menéndez
- Leiomitra sphagnoides Spruce
- Leiomitra tomentosa (Sw.) Lindb.
