= Cyrto-hypnum =

Scientific classification
- Kingdom: Plantae
- Division: Bryophyta
- Class: Bryopsida
- Subclass: Bryidae
- Order: Hypnales
- Family: Thuidiaceae
- Genus: Cyrto-hypnum (Hampe) Hampe & Lorentz

Genus of mosses

Cyrto-hypnum is a genus of mosses belonging to the family Thuidiaceae.

== Species ==
Species as accepted by GBIF;

- Cyrto-hypnum arzobispoae (Müll. Hal.) S.P. Churchill & E. Linares, 1995
- Cyrto-hypnum atlanticum (Hedenäs) Hedenäs & Sérgio, 1992
- Cyrto-hypnum brachythecium (Hampe & Lorentz) Hampe & Lorentz, 1869
- Cyrto-hypnum brotheri (E.S.Salmon) W.R.Buck & H.A.Crum
- Cyrto-hypnum byssoideum (Besch.) W.R.Buck & H.A.Crum
- Cyrto-hypnum campanulatum (Mitt.) S.P.Churchill
- Cyrto-hypnum chenagonii (Müll.Hal. ex Renauld & Cardot) W.R.Buck & H.A.Crum
- Cyrto-hypnum ciliatum (Mitt.) S.P.Churchill & E.Linares
- Cyrto-hypnum cylindraceum Churchill, 1994
- Cyrto-hypnum espinosae Churchill, 1994
- Cyrto-hypnum frontinoae Churchill & Linares C., 1995
- Cyrto-hypnum fuscatum (Besch.) P.C.Wu, Crosby & S.He
- Cyrto-hypnum gratum (P.Beauv.) W.R.Buck & H.A.Crum
- Cyrto-hypnum intermedium Churchill, 1994
- Cyrto-hypnum intricatum (A.Jaeger) W.R.Buck & H.A.Crum
- Cyrto-hypnum investe (Mitt.) W.R.Buck & H.A.Crum
- Cyrto-hypnum kiasense (R.S.Williams) W.R.Buck & H.A.Crum
- Cyrto-hypnum koelzii (H.Rob.) W.R.Buck & H.A.Crum
- Cyrto-hypnum kuripanum (Dozy & Molk.) W.R.Buck & H.A.Crum
- Cyrto-hypnum lepidoziaceum (Sakurai) W.R.Buck & H.Crum, 1990
- Cyrto-hypnum leptocladum (Taylor) W.R.Buck & H.A.Crum
- Cyrto-hypnum mexicanum (Mitt.) W.R.Buck & H.A.Crum
- Cyrto-hypnum microphyllum (Schwägr.) P.C.Wu, Crosby & S.He
- Cyrto-hypnum minusculum (Mitt.) W.R.Buck & H.A.Crum
- Cyrto-hypnum pelekinoides (P.C.Chen) W.R.Buck & H.A.Crum
- Cyrto-hypnum pseudoinvolvens W.R.Buck & H.Crum, 1990
- Cyrto-hypnum pygmaeum (Schimp.) W.R.Buck & H.A.Crum
- Cyrto-hypnum ramusculosum (Mitt.) W.R.Buck & H.A.Crum
- Cyrto-hypnum rubiginosum (Besch.) W.R.Buck & H.A.Crum
- Cyrto-hypnum schistocalyx (Müll.Hal.) W.R.Buck & H.A.Crum
- Cyrto-hypnum sharpii W.R.Buck & H.Crum, 1990
- Cyrto-hypnum squarrosulum (Renauld & Cardot) W.R.Buck & H.A.Crum
- Cyrto-hypnum stevensii W.R.Buck & H.Crum, 1990
- Cyrto-hypnum synoicum (A.Touw) W.R.Buck & H.A.Crum
- Cyrto-hypnum talongense (Besch.) W.R.Buck & H.A.Crum
- Cyrto-hypnum tamariscellum (Müll.Hal.) W.R.Buck & H.A.Crum
- Cyrto-hypnum tenuissimum (Welw. & Duby) W.R.Buck & H.A.Crum
- Cyrto-hypnum venustulum (Besch.) W.R.Buck & H.A.Crum
- Cyrto-hypnum vestitissimum (Besch.) W.R.Buck & H.A.Crum
