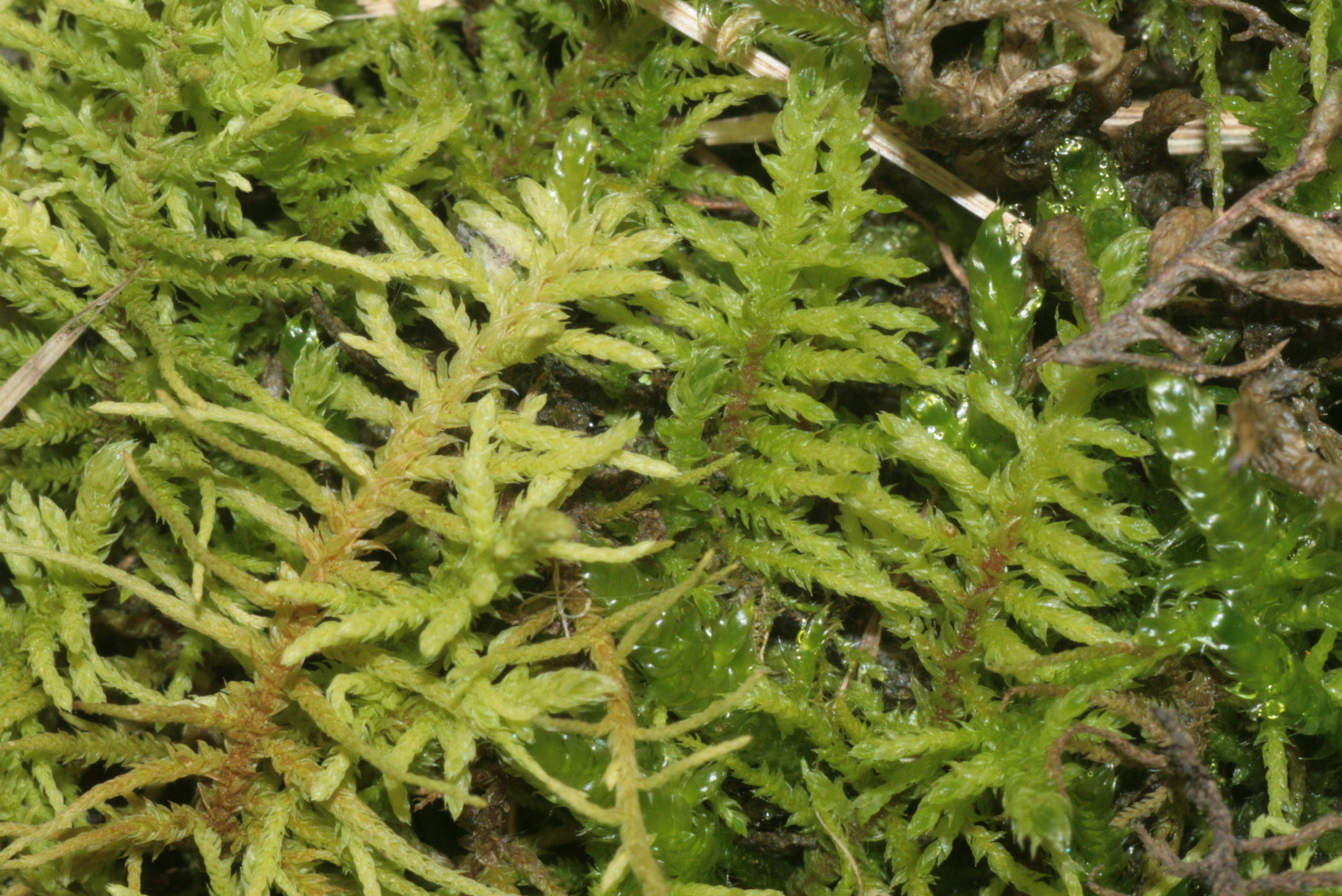

Scientific classification
- Kingdom: Plantae
- Division: Bryophyta
- Class: Bryopsida
- Subclass: Bryidae
- Order: Hypnales
- Family: Thuidiaceae
- Genus: Abietinella
- Species: A. abietina

Binomial name
- Abietinella abietina (Hedw.) M. Fleisch.

= Abietinella abietina =

Species of moss

Abietinella abietina is a species of moss in the family Thuidiaceae. It is a small, distinctive pleurocarpous moss with erect stems and spreading branches, reminiscent of a tiny conifer. Its extremely rare variety, abietina, occurs along the commoner var. hystricosa on coastal sand dunes. Abietinella abietina is perennial in its growth, meaning it can be observed throughout the year.

== Characteristics ==
Abietinella abietina shoots are of either green or dark brown. The tips of the shoots are usually yellow or green. The shoots are once-pinnate which have branches in four rows (arranged with two on each side of the stem) in two planes. Secondary stems are the length of about 5–10 cm. The leaves of the stems of Abientinella abietina are broad and oval shaped. They are longitudinally ridged and have a broad base. The leaves of the branch are smaller compared to the leaves of the stem which are bigger.

Abietinella abietina has the ability to grow stems which are about 2–8 cm in length (but rarely ever 12 cm). Branches arise in four ranks from these stems. The branches are often spread out at wide angles which result in sparse branches. The leaves of Abietinella abietina are broadly ovate, patent, and they plicate at the base and they also taper to a long acuminate apex. The leaves of the branches are rather concave and broadly ovate to lanceolate, with a rather shorter apex.

== Habitat ==
Abietinella abietina favor soils which are shallow mostly in unimproved grassland which overlies calcareous sandy soil, dune slacks, and banks in quarries. It is known to hardly ever occur on base-rich slopes or rocky ledges in mountains. It would be extremely rare if found.

== Similar species ==
A similar plant is Thiudium tamarscinum, which is 'tripinnate'; it consists of pinnately compound leaves arranged in a single plane. Because of this, it has a feathery look, more so then A. aaietina.
