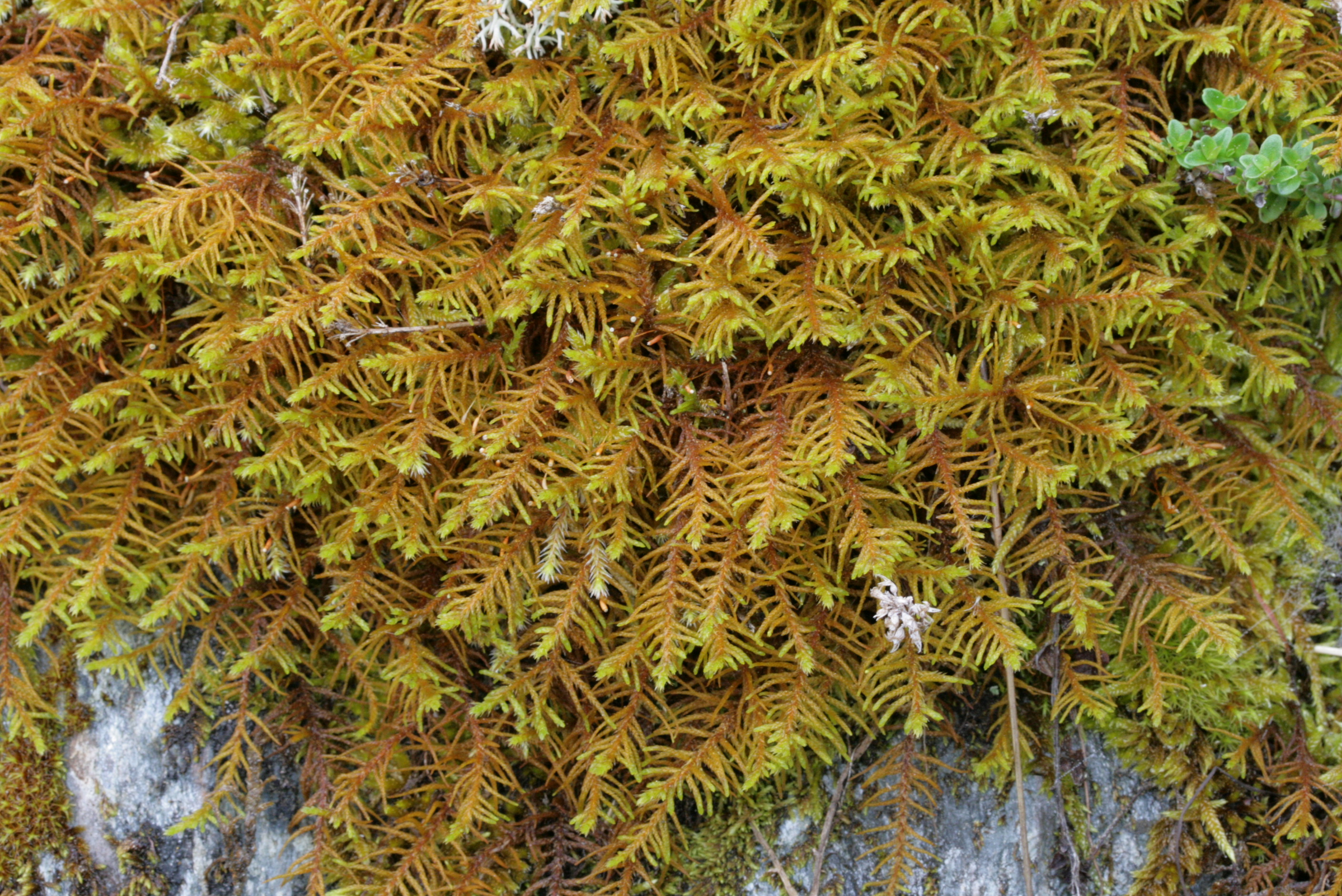
- Abietinella abietina

Scientific classification
- Kingdom: Plantae
- Division: Bryophyta
- Class: Bryopsida
- Subclass: Bryidae
- Order: Hypnales
- Family: Thuidiaceae
- Genus: Abietinella; Müll. Hal.

= Abietinella (plant) =

Genus of mosses

Abietinella (plant) is a genus of moss belonging to the family Thuidiaceae.

The genus was first described by Johann Karl August Müller.

Species:

- Abietinella abietina (Hedw.) M.Fleisch.
  - Abietinella abietina var. abietina (Hedw.) M.Fleisch.
- Abietinella brandisii (Müll.Hal.) Broth.
- Abietinella hystricosa (Mitt.) Broth.
