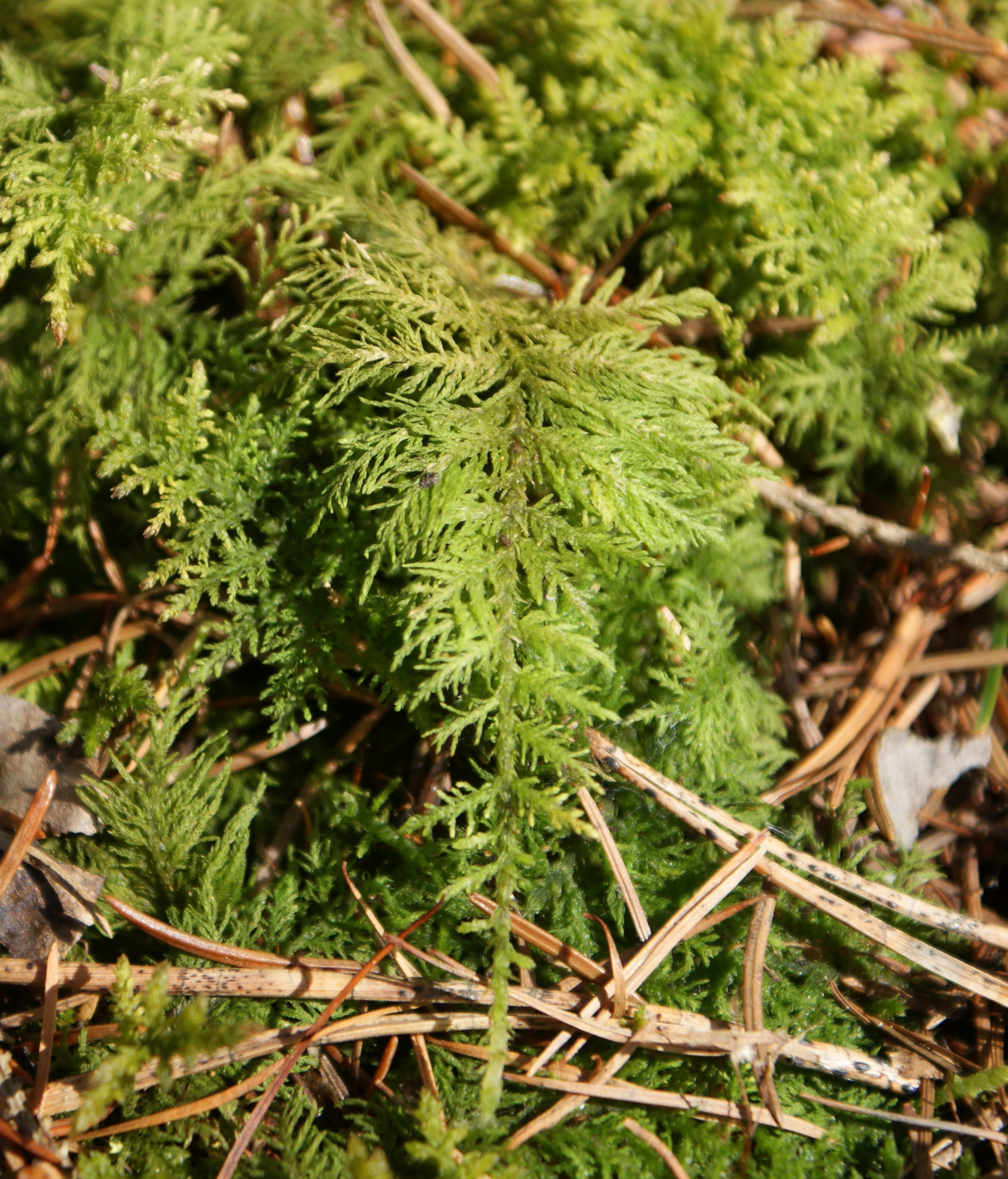

Scientific classification
- Kingdom: Plantae
- Division: Bryophyta
- Class: Bryopsida
- Subclass: Bryidae
- Order: Hypnales
- Family: Thuidiaceae
- Genus: Thuidium
- Species: T. tamariscinum

Binomial name
- Thuidium tamariscinum W.P.Schimper, 1852

= Thuidium tamariscinum =

Species of moss

Thuidium tamariscinum is a species of moss belonging to the family Thuidiaceae. It has an almost cosmopolitan distribution.

In a study of the effect of the herbicide Asulam on moss growth, Thuidium tamariscinum was shown to have intermediate sensitivity to Asulam exposure.
