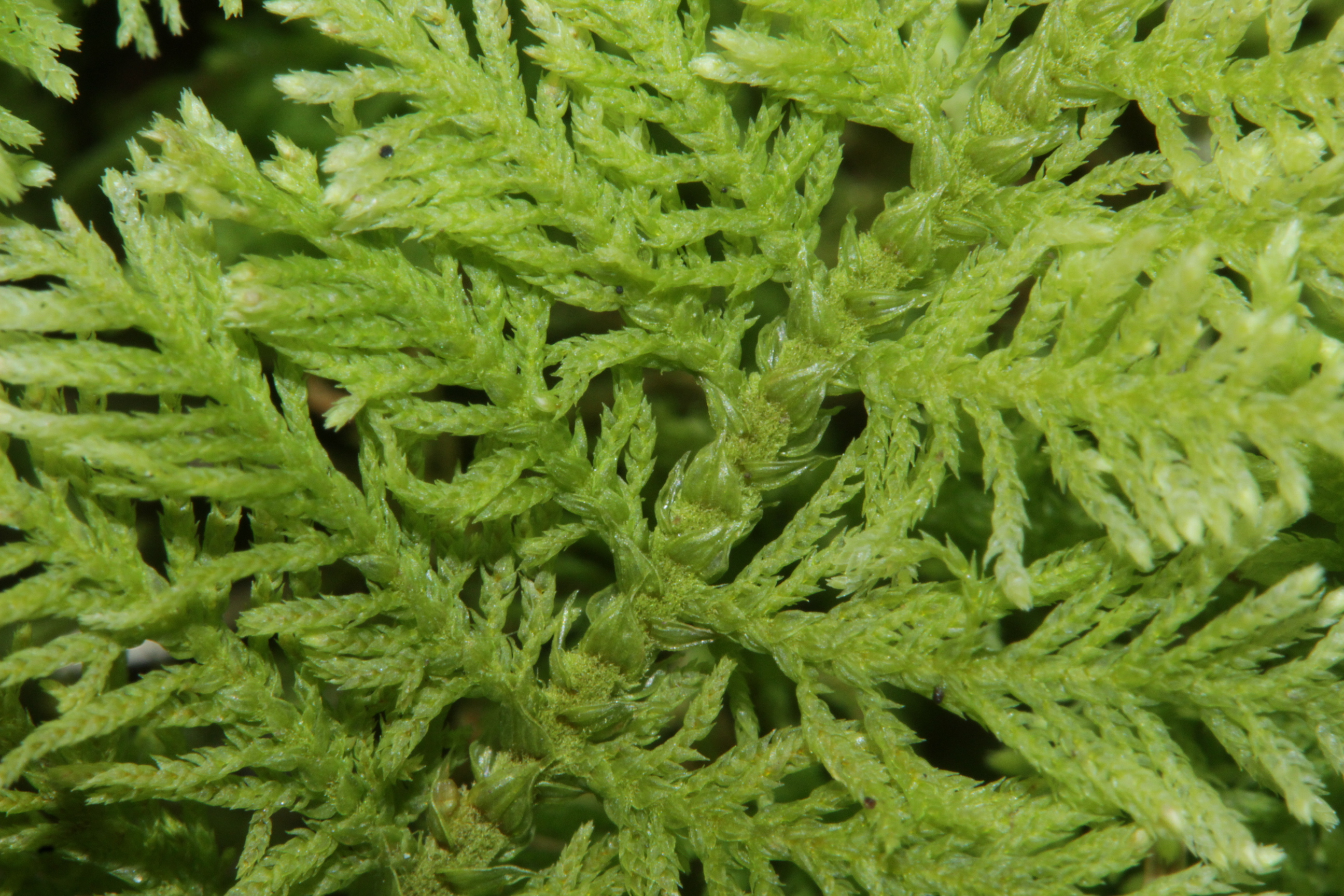
- Thuidium delicatulum

Scientific classification
- Kingdom: Plantae
- Division: Bryophyta
- Class: Bryopsida
- Subclass: Bryidae
- Order: Hypnales
- Family: Thuidiaceae
- Genus: Thuidium; Bruch & Schimp.

= Thuidium =

Genus of mosses

Thuidium is a genus of moss in the family Thuidiaceae. The name comes from the genus Thuja and the Latin suffix -idium, meaning diminutive. This is due to its resemblance to small cedar trees.

== Description ==
Members of the genus are characterized by creeping, highly branched, pinnate leaves.

There are approximately 230 species found distributed in North America, Mexico, West Indies, Central America, South America, Europe, and Asia.

== Species ==
As of October 2024, World Flora Online accepts 55 species, along with 147 synonyms and 5 unplaced:

- Thuidium aculeoserratum Renauld & Cardot
- Thuidium allenii Austin
- Thuidium alvarezianum Cardot
- Thuidium arzobispoae (Müll. Hal.) A. Jaeger
- Thuidium assimile (Mitt.) A. Jaeger
- Thuidium bifidum A.E.R. Soares & P.E.A.S. Câmara
- Thuidium brachypyxis Müll. Hal.
- Thuidium brasiliense Mitt.
- Thuidium breviacuminatum Herzog
- Thuidium carantae (Müll. Hal.) A. Jaeger
- Thuidium cardotii Paris
- Thuidium chacoanum Müll. Hal.
- Thuidium cylindraceum Mitt.
- Thuidium cylindrella Müll. Hal.
- Thuidium cymbifolium (Dozy & Molk.) Dozy & Molk.
- Thuidium delicatulum (Hedw.) Schimp.
- Thuidium diaphanum (Müll. Hal.) Paris
- Thuidium espinosae Herzog
- Thuidium frontinoae (Müll. Hal.) A. Jaeger
- Thuidium granulatum (Hampe) A. Jaeger
- Thuidium hygrophilum Głow.
- Thuidium inconspicuum Herzog
- Thuidium intermedium Mitt.
- Thuidium kanedae Sakurai
- Thuidium laeviusculum (Mitt.) A. Jaeger
- Thuidium ligulifolium Herzog
- Thuidium loricalycinum (Müll. Hal.) Kindb.
- Thuidium mattogrossense Broth.
- Thuidium mentiens Podp.
- Thuidium ochraceum Herzog
- Thuidium paraguense Besch.
- Thuidium patrum Sehnem
- Thuidium perscissum (Müll. Hal.) A. Jaeger
- Thuidium peruvianum Mitt.
- Thuidium pinnatulum (Hampe) Lindb.
- Thuidium plumulosum (Dozy & Molk.) Dozy & Molk.
- Thuidium poeppigii Müll. Hal.
- Thuidium pristocalyx (Müll. Hal.) A. Jaeger
- Thuidium pseudodelicatulum A. Jaeger
- Thuidium pseudoglaucinum Touw
- Thuidium pseudoprotensum (Müll. Hal.) Mitt.
- Thuidium pulvinatulum Müll. Hal.
- Thuidium quadrifarium Mitt.
- Thuidium recognitum (Hedw.) Lindb.
- Thuidium serricola (Müll. Hal.) Paris
- Thuidium subglaucinum Cardot
- Thuidium subgranulatum (Geh. & Hampe) Kindb
- Thuidium submicropteris Cardot
- Thuidium subtamariscinum (Hampe) Broth.
- Thuidium tamariscinum (Hedw.) Schimp.
- Thuidium thermophilum Czernjadieva
- Thuidium tomentosum Schimp.
- Thuidium unipinnatum Y. M. Fang & T.J. Kop.
- Thuidium urceolatum Lorentz
- Thuidium yungarum Herzog
