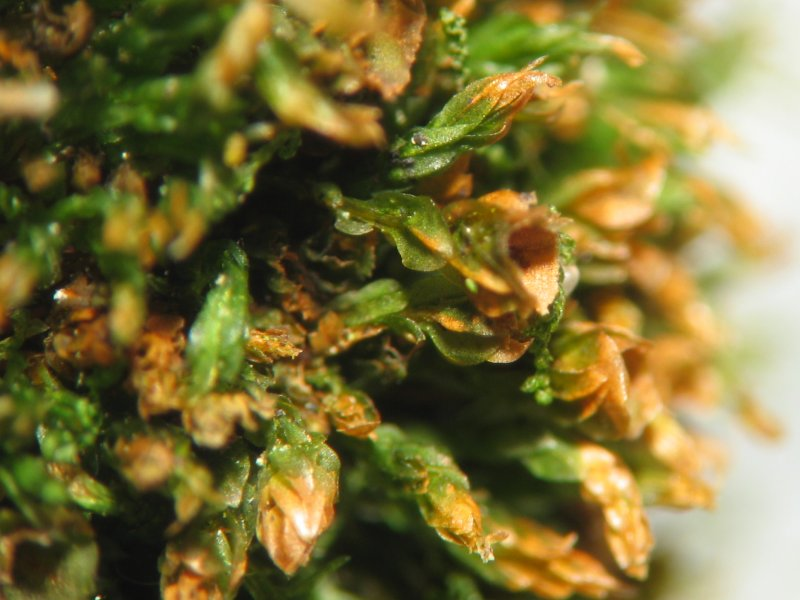
- Tetraphis pellucida

Scientific classification
- Kingdom: Plantae
- Division: Bryophyta
- Class: Tetraphidopsida; Goffinet & Buck
- Order: Tetraphidales; M. Fleisch.
- Family: Tetraphidaceae; Schimp.

Genera
- Tetraphis; Tetrodontium

= Tetraphidaceae =

Family of mosses

Tetraphidaceae is a family of mosses. It includes only the two genera Tetraphis and Tetrodontium, each with two species. The defining feature of the family is the 4-toothed peristome.

family Tetraphidaceae

Tetraphis

Tetraphis geniculata
Tetraphis pellucida

Tetrodontium

Tetrodontium brownianum
Tetrodontium repandum

- - Takakiopsida
  - Sphagnopsida
  - - - Andreaeopsida
      - Andreaeobryopsida
      - - Oedipodiopsida
        - - Tetraphidaceae
          - Polytrichopsida
          - Bryopsida

The classification of Tetraphidaceae, and its phylogenetic position among the mosses.

== Range ==
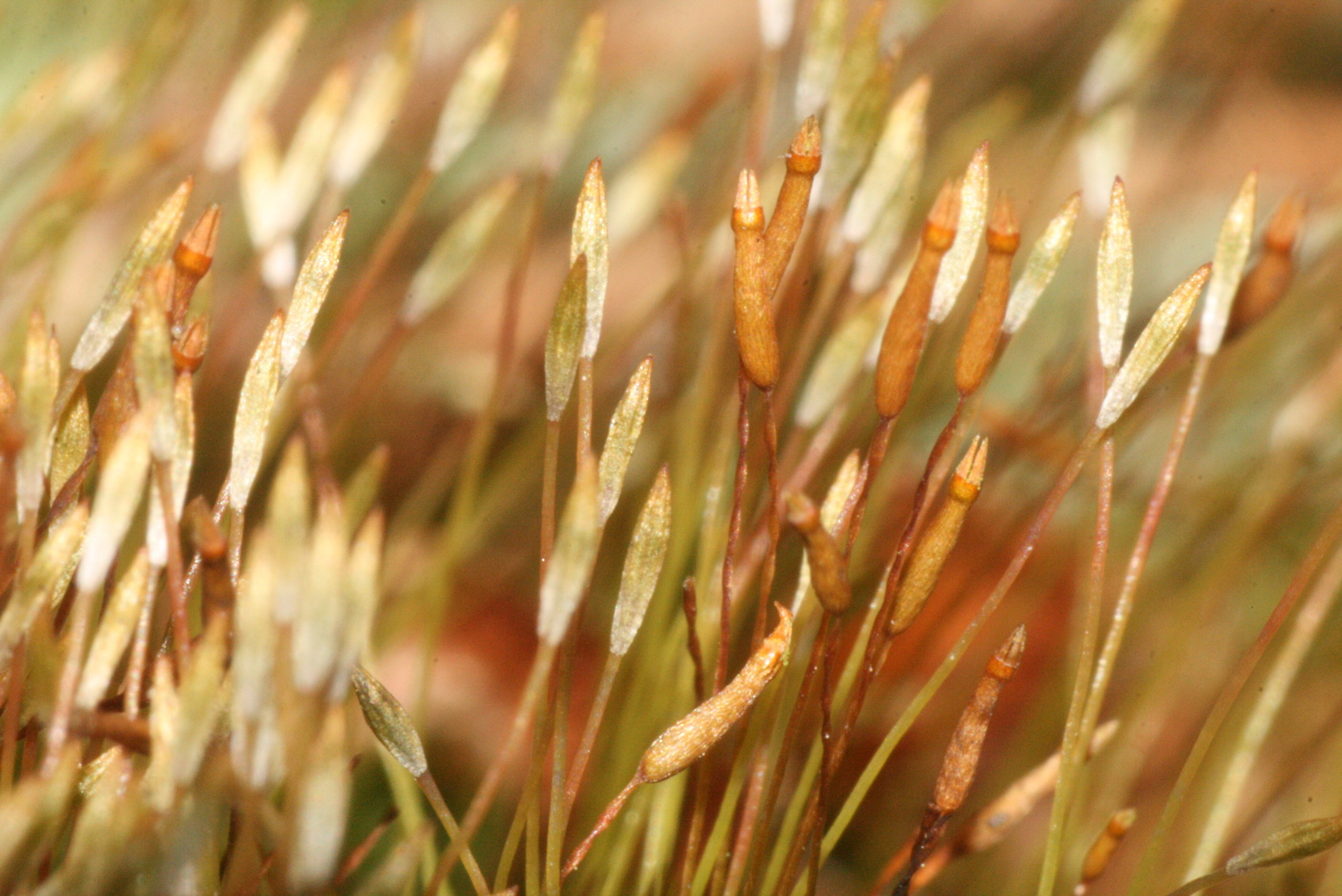
The shoot and four-toothed peristome of Tetraphis pellucida

This family of mosses is most commonly found in northern latitudes.

=== Tetraphis ===
Tetraphis pellucida is the most common species in the family and is usually found in deciduous forests. Its leaves become wider in colder climates, which often leads to a misclassification of the species. Tetraphis geniculata is less commonly found and also appears in northern latitudes. The species often grows alongside the only other species in the genus, T. pellucida. Both Tetraphis species are found growing on moist sedimentary rocks and also on soil with high organic content, but the genus is mostly found growing on rotting logs.

=== Tetrodontium ===
Tetrodontium brownianum grows most frequently on wet and shady rocks, of either granite or sandstone. The species normally grows alone but has been found growing with other bryophytes. Tetrodontium repandum is extremely rare and has been found growing in parts of central Europe, western North America and southeast Asia.

== Morphology ==
The most notable anatomical structure in the family Tetraphidaceae is the four teeth that make up the peristome. The teeth are whole, thick-walled cells which classifies the moss family as nematodontous. The teeth help the plant adapt as they can sense changes in the moisture in change length.

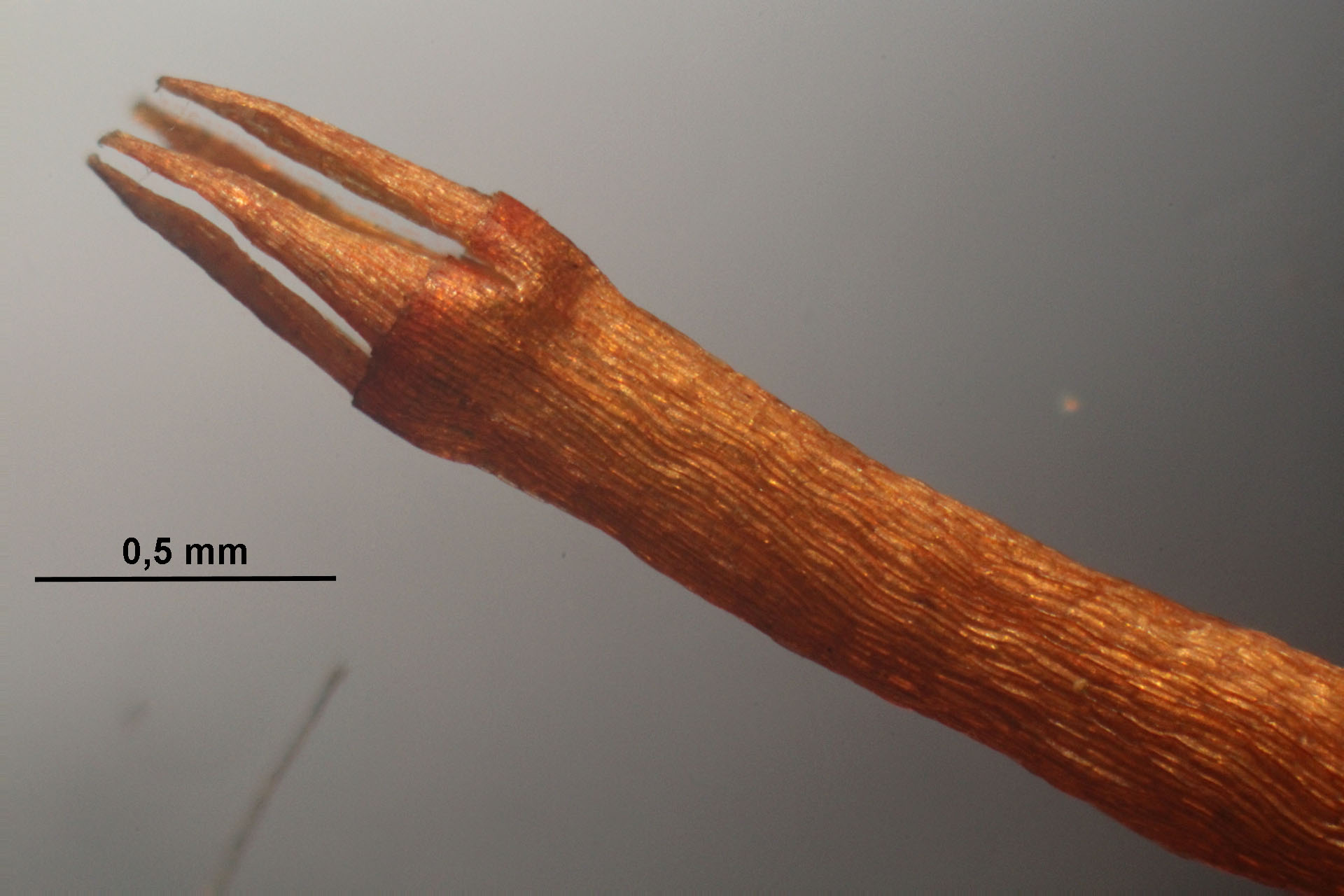
A close-up on the four-toothed peristome on the Tetraphis pellucida. The four-toothed peristome is a characteristic of the Tetraphidaceae.

=== Tetraphis ===
The genus Tetraphis is made up of the species T. pellucida and T. geniculta. The shoots on T. pellucida can be up to 1.5 cm tall and the lower leaves are often only 1 mm in length. The fertile shoot tips are longer with distinct leaves while the leaves on the sterile shoot tips are more clumped together. The crowded leaves of the non-fertile shoot tip may form a gemma cup. The capsule, which is only about 2–3 mm in length, contains the spores used in asexual reproduction and is made up of four peristome teeth. The capsule usually fruits around early summer and the green, papillose spores are spread by wind.

The main contrast between T. pellucida and T. geniculta is the characteristics of the setae. In T. pellucida the setae are smooth and straight while in T. geniculta they are bent and papillose. In their immature forms, it is often difficult to tell one species from another as the seta is not yet fully developed.

=== Tetrodontium ===
Tetrodontium brownianum has short, bristle-like structures that grow out of the protonemal leaves. These structures can be up to 4 mm long and the protonemal leaves can be up to 2.5 mm long. Four triangular teeth make up the egg-shaped capsules which are normally only 1 mm long. The spores are smooth, in contrast to the papillose spores produced by species in the genus Tetraphis. Tetrodontium repandum is very similar but has long, thin branches and the stem usually only grows to be about 2 mm in height. In some cases, a colony of Tetrodontium is made up only of the protonemal leaves. Additionally, Tetrodontium species do not have specialized asexual structures, in contrast to species in the genus Tetraphis.

== History of taxonomy ==
Johann Hedwig first described and named the genus Tetraphis and the species Tetraphis pellucida in his book Species Muscorum Frondosorum, published in 1801. In 1824 Christian Friedrich Schwägrichen named the genus Tetrodontium. The phylogeny and taxonomy of the family Tetraphidaceae, in relation to other bryophytes, have long been disputed among bryologists. Some believe that there are characteristics of the family, like the thalloid protonema or the development of the peristome, that indicate that the moss is primitive and may share a common ancestor with Sphagnopsida and Andreaeidae. The exact phylogeny of the family and its species continues to be discussed among bryologists.
