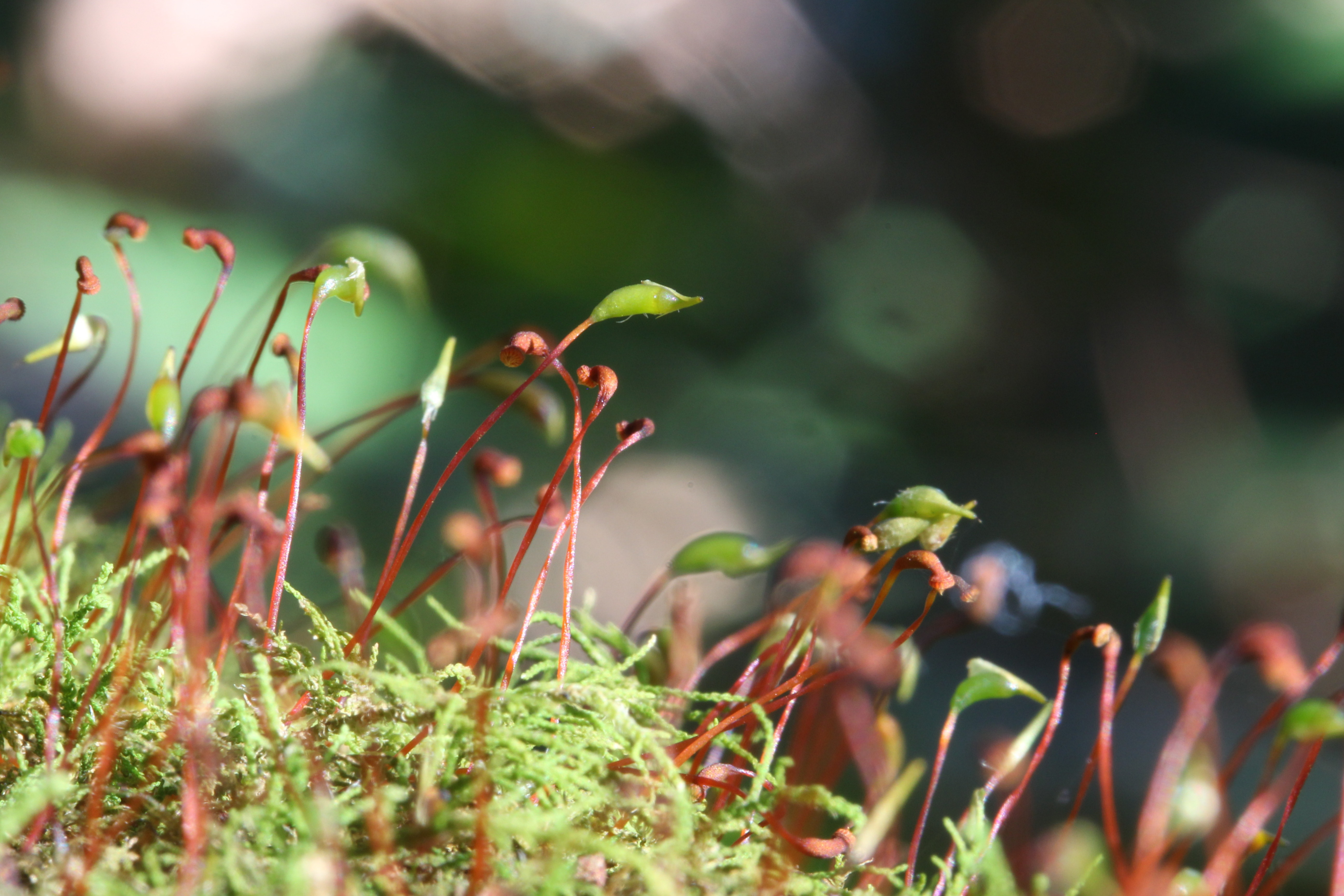

Scientific classification
- Kingdom: Plantae
- Division: Bryophyta
- Class: Bryopsida
- Subclass: Bryidae
- Order: Hypnales
- Family: Thuidiaceae
- Genus: Thuidiopsis
- Species: T. sparsa

Binomial name
- Thuidiopsis sparsa (Hook.f. & Wilson) Broth.

= Thuidiopsis sparsa =

Species of moss

Thuidiopsis sparsa is a species of moss in the family Thuidiaceae. The natural distribution includes Australia, Papua New Guinea, New Zealand and nearby islands.
