= Tetrodontium repandum =

Scientific classification
- Kingdom: Plantae
- Division: Bryophyta
- Class: Tetraphidopsida
- Order: Tetraphidales
- Family: Tetraphidaceae
- Genus: Tetrodontium
- Species: T. repandum

Binomial name
- Tetrodontium repandum (Funck) Schwagrichen

Synonyms
- Georgia brownii var. repanda (Funck) Lindb.; Georgia repanda (Funck) Müll. Hal.; Tetraphis browniana var. repanda (Funck) Hampe; Tetraphis ovata var. repanda (Funck) Hampe; Tetraphis repanda Funck; Tetrodontium brownianum subsp. repandum (Funck) Boulay; Tetrodontium brownianum var. repandum (Funck) Limpr.; Tetrodontium ovatum var. repandum (Funck) Mårtensson

Species of moss

Tetrodontium repandum, the small four-tooth moss, is a moss in the family Tetraphidaceae. It is one of only two recognized species in the genus Tetrodontium, and is native to subalpine regions of the Northern Hemisphere. It has been reported from Alaska, British Columbia, Washington state, Japan, and Europe.

== See also ==
- List of extinct plants of the British Isles
