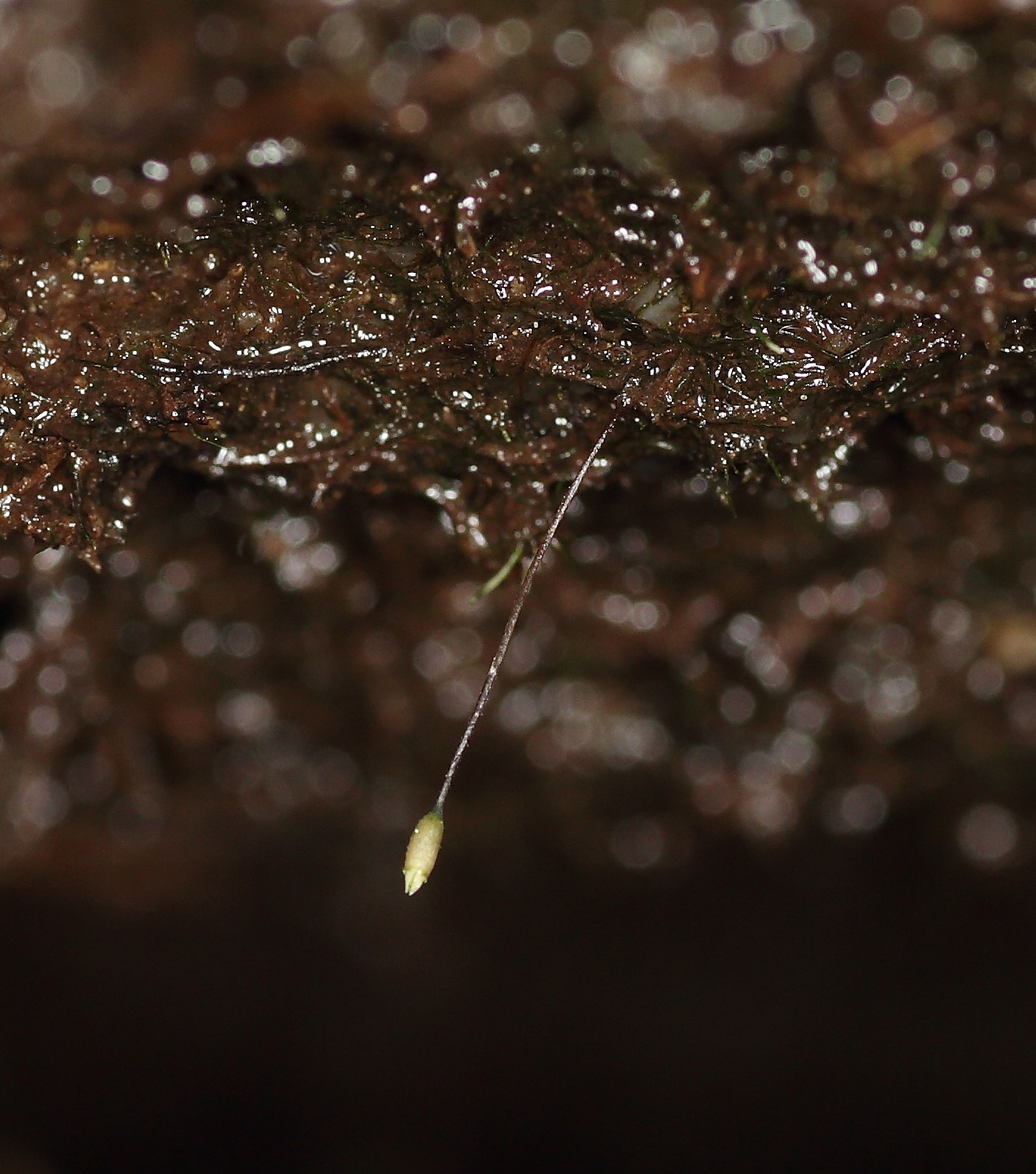

Scientific classification
- Kingdom: Plantae
- Division: Bryophyta
- Class: Tetraphidopsida
- Order: Tetraphidales
- Family: Tetraphidaceae
- Genus: Tetrodontium
- Species: T. brownianum

Binomial name
- Tetrodontium brownianum Dickson. Schwaegr.

= Tetrodontium brownianum =

Species of moss

Tetrodontium brownianum is a species of moss commonly known as Brown's tetrodontium moss or Brown's four-tooth moss. It is widely distributed. In North America it is found in Washington state and British Columbia on the west coast and from Newfoundland to Ohio to the east. It is also present in Austria, France, Germany, Ireland, Norway, Sweden, Switzerland and the United Kingdom as well as Japan, New Zealand and Chile.

It is named after Robert Brown, the Scottish botanist who first discovered the plant growing at Roslin near Edinburgh in the late 18th century whilst still a student. The plant can still be found at the site of its discovery.

== Characteristics ==
This moss species is minute, typically no more than 2 mm in height, often occurring as dark brown sporophytes emerging directly from rock surfaces. The leafy shoots are also very small, composed of a few overlapping leaves, approximately 1 mm long. The growth originates from a persistent protonema, producing specialised protonemal leaves. They may reach up to 2.5 mm in length and are typically shiny and linear.

== Habitat ==
Tetrodontium brownianum is commonly found under overhangs and on base-enriched siliceous rock faces. It is usually located in the shade.
