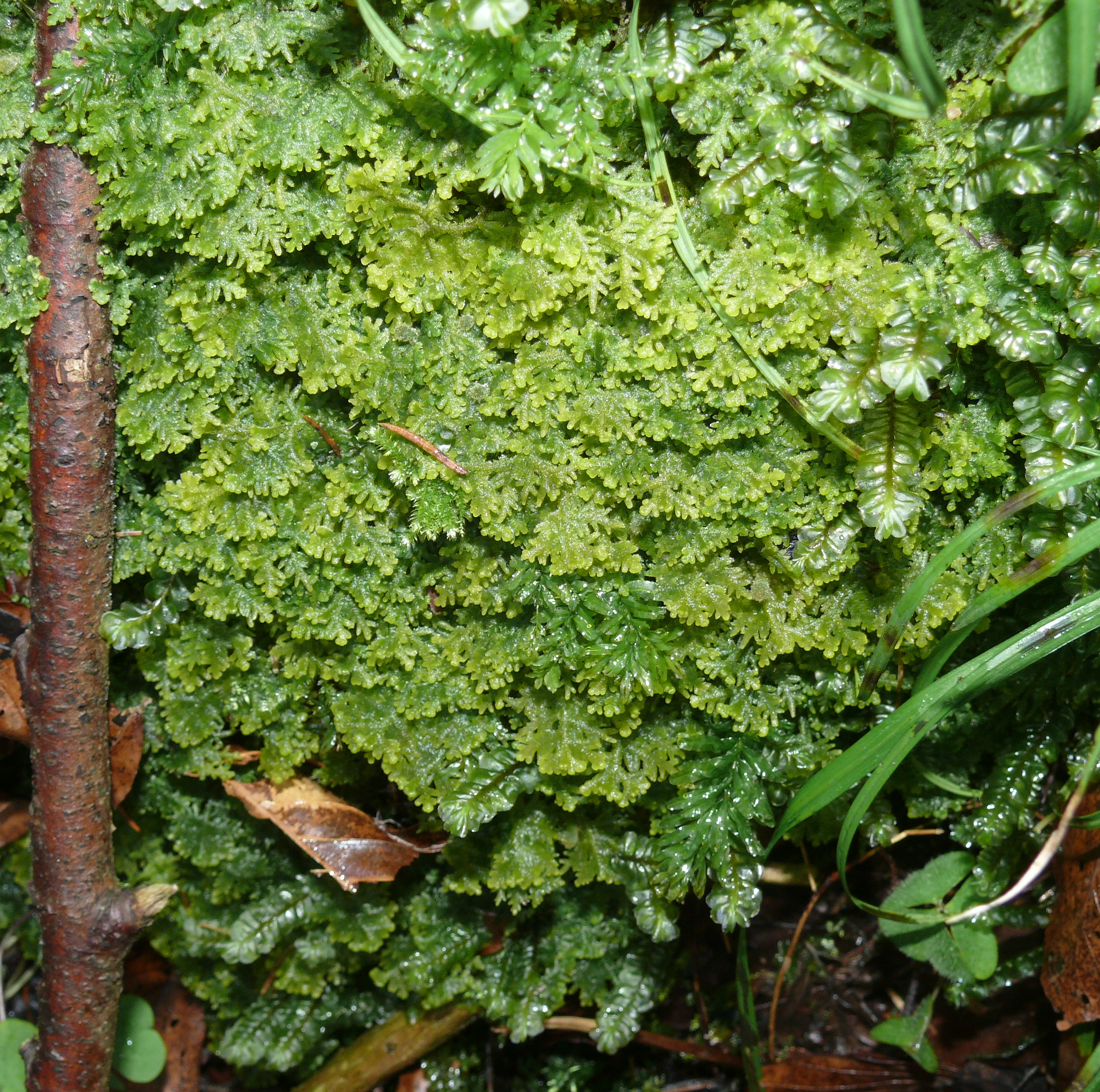
- Trichocolea tomentella

Scientific classification
- Kingdom: Plantae
- Division: Marchantiophyta
- Class: Jungermanniopsida
- Order: Lepidoziales
- Family: Trichocoleaceae; Nakai, 1943

Genera
- Eotrichocolea R.M.Schust.; Leiomitra Lindb.; Trichocolea Dumort.

= Trichocoleaceae =

Family of plants

Trichocoleaceae is a family of liverworts in the order Jungermanniales.
