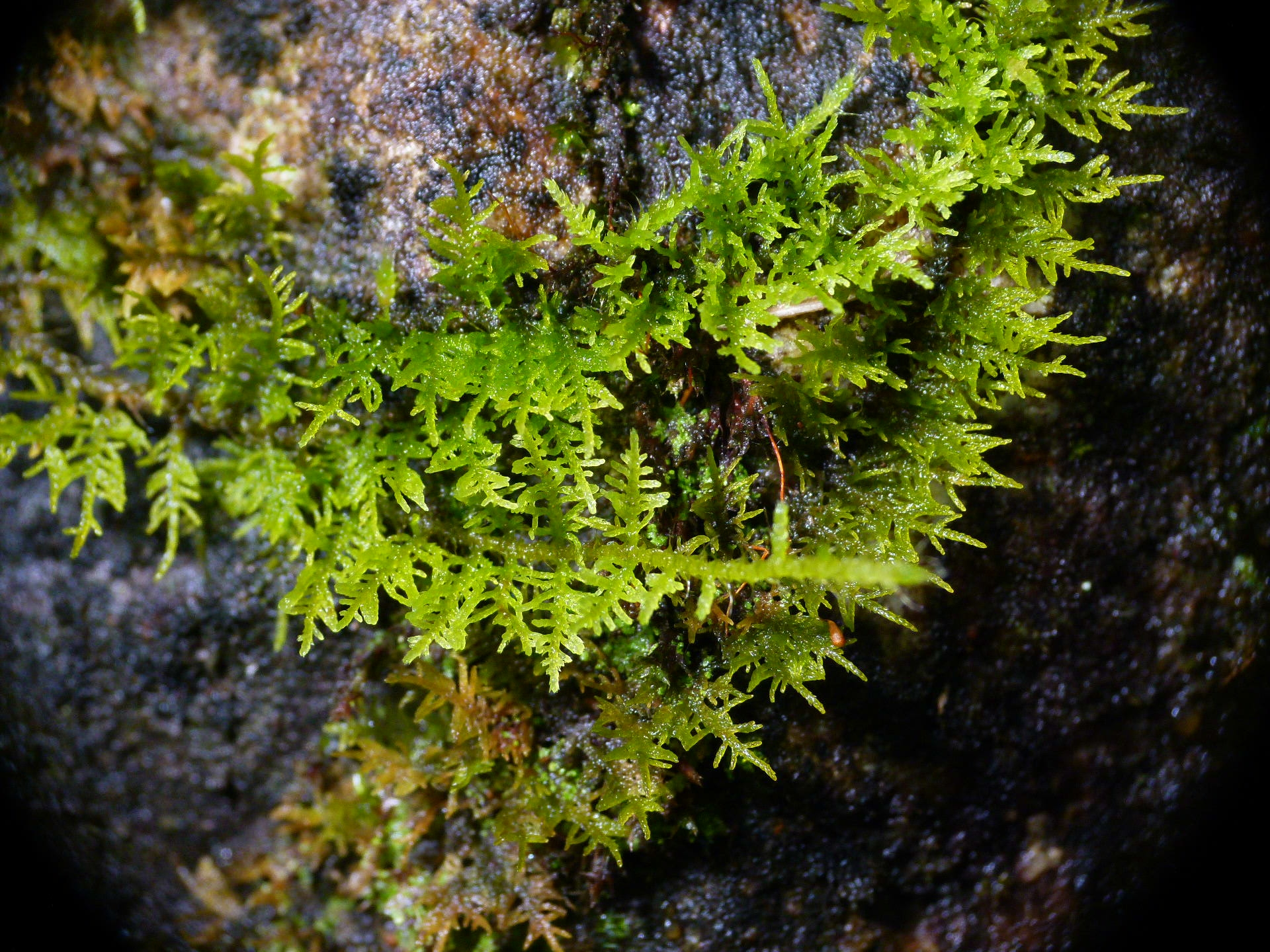
- Pelekium cf. gratum

Scientific classification
- Kingdom: Plantae
- Division: Bryophyta
- Class: Bryopsida
- Subclass: Bryidae
- Order: Hypnales
- Family: Thuidiaceae; Schimp.

= Thuidiaceae =

Family of mosses

Thuidiaceae is a family of mosses within the order Hypnales. It includes many genera but the classification may need to be refined. The core genera are Thuidium, Thuidiopsis, Pelekium, Aequatoriella, Abietinella, Rauiella, Haplocladium and Actinothuidium form a clade but others currently placed in the family may belong elsewhere.

Species include Thuidiopsis sparsa and Abietinella abietina

== Genera ==
As of March 2025, World Flora Online accepts the following genera:

- Abietinella Müll.Hal. (1 species)
- Boulaya Cardot (1 species)
- Bryonoguchia Z.Iwats. & Inoue (1 species)
- Echinophyllum T.J.O'Brien (1 species)
- Fauriella Besch. (5 species)
- Herpetineuron (Müll.Hal.) Cardot (1 species)
- Indothuidium Touw (1 species)
- Inouethuidium R.Watan. (1 species)
- Orthothuidium D.H.Norris & T.J.Kop. (1 species)
- Pelekium Mitt. (33 species)
- Rauiella Reimers (6 species)
- Thuidiopsis (Broth.) M.Fleisch. (4 species)
- Thuidium Schimp. (57 species)
