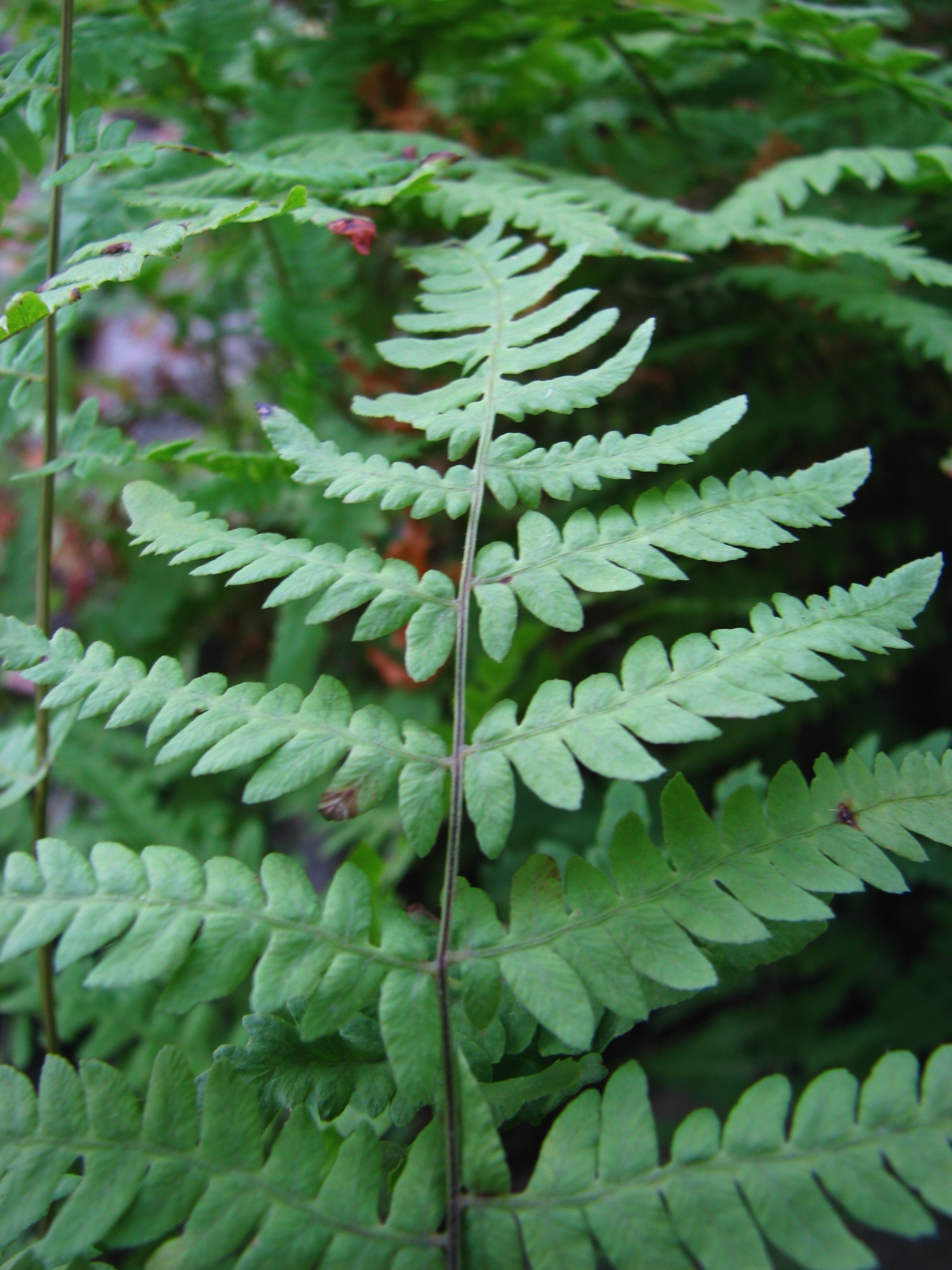
- Thelypteris palustris

Scientific classification
- Kingdom: Plantae
- Clade: Tracheophytes
- Division: Polypodiophyta
- Class: Polypodiopsida
- Order: Polypodiales
- Suborder: Aspleniineae
- Family: Thelypteridaceae
- Subfamily: Thelypteridoideae
- Genus: Thelypteris; Schmidel

Type species
- Thelypteris palustris Schott

Species
- See text.

Synonyms
- Asterochlaena C.Chr.

= Thelypteris =

Genus of polypod ferns

Thelypteris (maiden ferns) is a genus of ferns in the subfamily Thelypteridoideae, family Thelypteridaceae, order Polypodiales. Two radically different circumscriptions of the genus are in use as of January 2020. In the Pteridophyte Phylogeny Group classification of 2016 (PPG I), the genus is a very small one with about two species. In other approaches, the genus is the only one in the subfamily Thelypteridoideae, and so includes between 875 and 1083 species.

The genus name is from Greek thēlys "female" and pteris "fern". However, "female fern" usually refers to the common lady-fern.

== Taxonomy ==
At one time, all thelypterioid ferns were included in the genus Dryopteris because of the sorus shape. However, there are a great many differences between the groups, and these plants are now segregated in their own family.

Some researchers include the entire family Thelypteridaceae in the genus Thelypteris. An intermediate position is to place the bulk in Thelypteris (corresponding to Thelypterioideae of PPG I), which can then be divided into subgenera and sections corresponding to the genera of other authors, but to separate out Phegopteris and Macrothelypteris. Another choice is to divide the family into many genera, one of which is Thelypteris. This is the approach taken in the Pteridophyte Phylogeny Group classification of 2016 (PPG I).

=== Species ===
Using the circumscription of the genus in PPG I, as of October 2026, the Checklist of Ferns and Lycophytes of the World accepted two species:

- Thelypteris confluens (Thunb.) C.V.Morton
- Thelypteris palustris (Salisb.) Schott

Other sources place the entire subfamily Thelypteridoideae in the genus, and so accept many more species, including the following (synonyms from the Checklist of Ferns and Lycophytes of the World):

- Thelypteris aculeata A.R.Sm. = Amauropelta aculeata
- Thelypteris appressa A.R.Sm. = Amauropelta appressa
- Thelypteris bonapartii (Rosenst.) Alston = Amauropelta bonapartii
- Thelypteris campii A.R.Sm. = Amauropelta campii
- Thelypteris chimboracensis A.R.Sm. = Amauropelta chimboracensis
- Thelypteris conformis (Sodiro) A.R.Sm. = Amauropelta conformis
- Thelypteris correllii A.R.Sm. = Amauropelta correllii
- Thelypteris dodsonii A.R.Sm. = Amauropelta dodsonii
- Thelypteris elegantula (Sodiro) Alston = Amauropelta elegantula
- Thelypteris euthythrix A.R.Sm. = Amauropelta euthythrix
- Thelypteris fluminalis A.R.Sm. = Amauropelta fluminalis
- Thelypteris inabonensis Proctor = Amauropelta inabonensis
- Thelypteris kunthii (Desv.) Morton = Christella normalis
- Thelypteris macra A.R.Sm. = Amauropelta macra
- Thelypteris nevadensis (Baker) Clute ex Morton = Parathelypteris nevadensis
- Thelypteris noveboracensis (L.) Nieuwl. = Parathelypteris noveboracensis
- Thelypteris ovata R.P.St.John = Pelazoneuron ovatum
- Thelypteris pilosa (M.Martens & Galeotti) Crawford = Stegnogramma pilosa
- Thelypteris puberula (Baker) Morton = Christella puberula
- Thelypteris rosenstockii (C.Chr.) R.M.Tryon = Amauropelta rosenstockii
- Thelypteris semilunata (Sodiro) A.R.Sm. = Amauropelta semilunata
- Thelypteris simulata (Davenport) Nieuwl. = Coryphopteris simulata
- Thelypteris subtilis A.R.Sm. = Amauropelta subtilis
- Thelypteris verecunda Proctor = Goniopteris verecunda
- Thelypteris yaucoensis Proctor = Goniopteris yaucoensis
