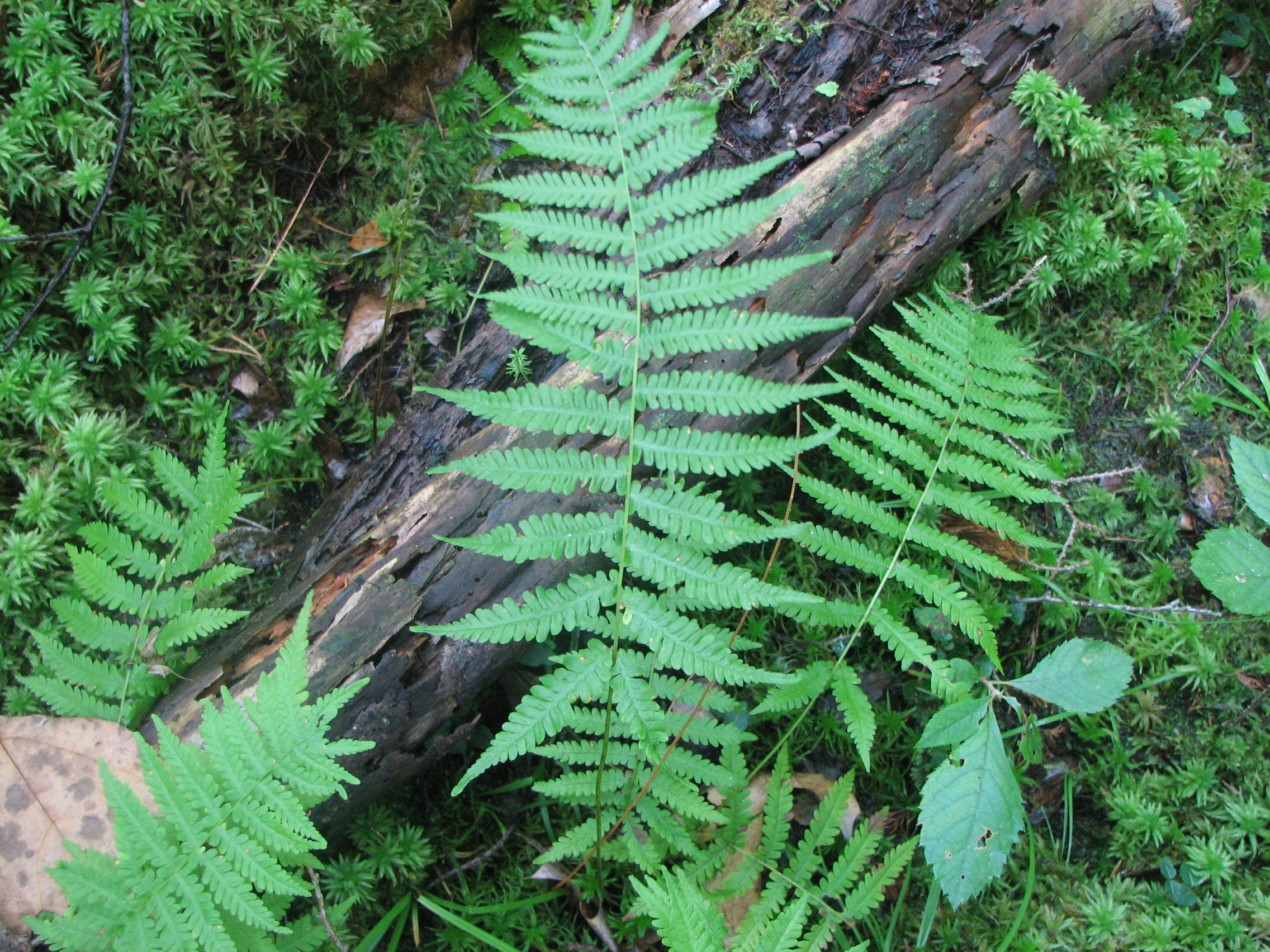
- In its natural habitat

Conservation status
- Apparently Secure (NatureServe)

Scientific classification
- Kingdom: Plantae
- Clade: Tracheophytes
- Division: Polypodiophyta
- Class: Polypodiopsida
- Order: Polypodiales
- Suborder: Aspleniineae
- Family: Thelypteridaceae
- Genus: Coryphopteris
- Species: C. simulata

Binomial name
- Coryphopteris simulata (Davenp.) S.E.Fawc.
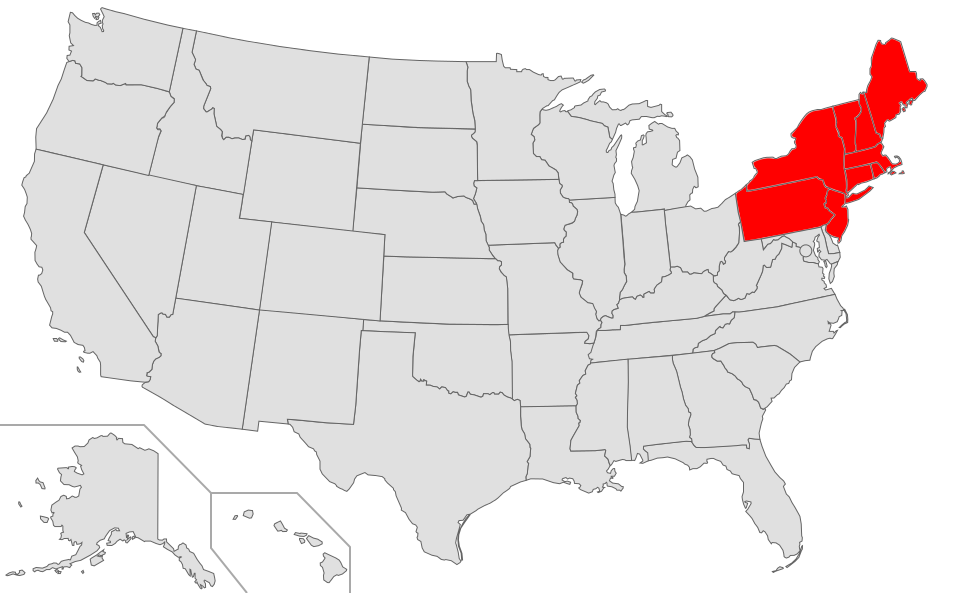
- Distribution in the Northeastern United States

Synonyms
- Aspidium simulatum Davenp.; Filix simulata (Davenp.) Farw.; Filix-mas thelypteris var. simulata (Davenp.) Farw.; Nephrodium simulatum Davenp. ex Diels; Parathelypteris simulata (Davenp.) Holttum; Thelypteris simulata (Davenp.) Nieuwl.; Wagneriopteris simulata (Davenp.) Á.Löve & D.Löve

= Coryphopteris simulata =

Species of fern

Coryphopteris simulata, synonym Thelypteris simulata, is a species of fern native to the Northeastern United States. It is known by two common names: bog-fern and Massachusetts fern. It is often confused with the silvery spleenwort, New York fern, and the marsh fern due to similarities in shape and size.

== Description ==
Coryphopteris simulata is bright green in color. The frond has some variation in shape, but it is around 61 cm (24 in) long, and its stalk is long and slender at 20.3 cm (8 in). The stalks are thin and slightly scaly, or hairy. The upwards portion is yellow-green in color, and the base is a light brown color.

The leaves are monomorphic and pinnately compounded; they can be between 10 and 40 cm (3.9-15.7 in) long and 7.6-15.3 cm (3–6 in) wide. The branching pattern appears to be opposite, but upon close observation it is clearly a slight alternate pattern. The leaf veins are for the most part unbranched, although some branching can be seen towards the lower part of the blade.

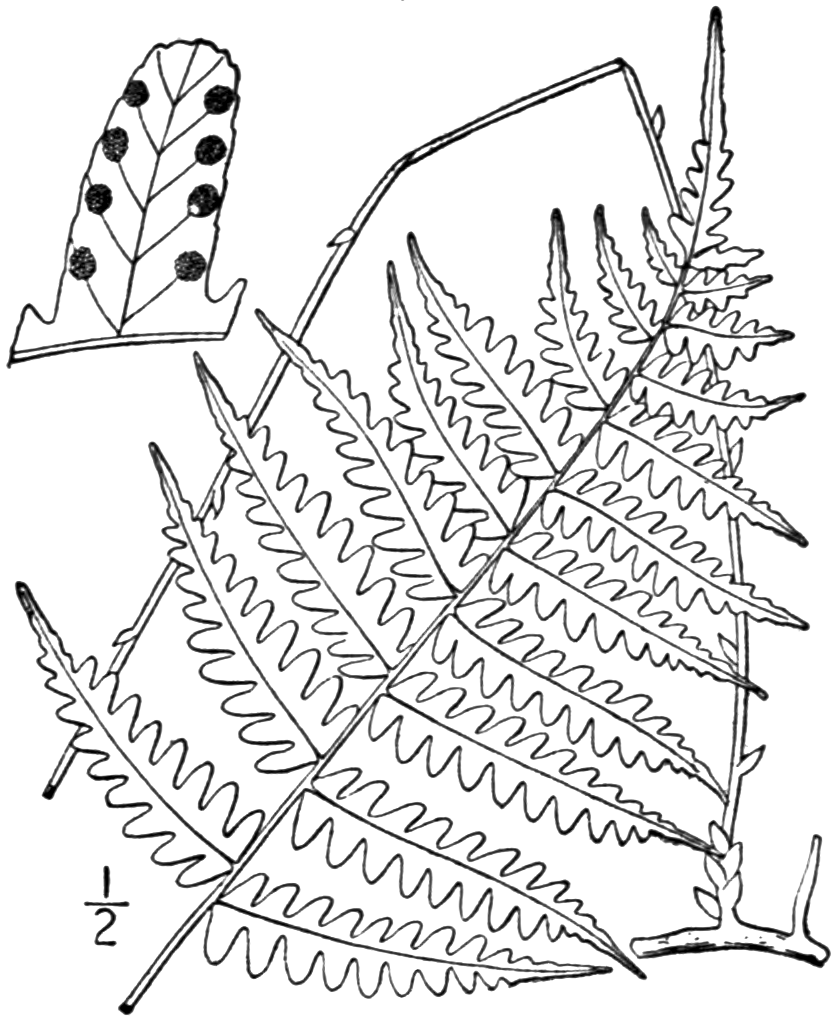

Coryphopteris simulata produces both fertile and sterile leaflets. The leaflets are twice-compounded and divided mid-vein into between fifteen and eighteen lobes. They are oblong in shape and become narrower near the axis, noticeably more so near the base. The majority of the leaflets are erect, but the bottom pair point downward. They are around 25–80 cm (9.8-31.5 in) long. The fertile and sterile leaflets are similar in shape in size, but the fertile leaflets tend to be slightly longer than the sterile leaflets. Sori (singular sorus), are found on the underside of the leaflets, and they are round in shape. The indusium is a pale tan color and is shaped like a kidney.

The rhizome is slender and black with some scales. It spreads out far and has a lot of branching. Older roots are short, black, thin, and wiry. There are many young, hairlike rootlets.

=== Growth ===
Coryphopteris simulata is a forb/herb perennial. The shoot system sprouts up from a rhizome, which is typically an underground root, but is sometimes found at the ground level. The leaves die and fall off during the wintertime. Spores are produced in the summertime.

== Taxonomy ==
The species was first described by George Edward Davenport in 1894 as Aspidium simulatum (in the same publication he also suggested that "those persons who reject Aspidium" could use the synonym Nephrodium simulatum). Genus boundaries in the family Thelypteridaceae have been subject to regular changes; the species has also been placed in Thelypteris (1910), Parathelypteris (1976) and more recently Coryphopteris (2018). As of January 2020, Plants of the World Online accepted the placement in Thelypteris, while the Checklist of Ferns and Lycophytes of the World accepted the placement in Coryphopteris.

One distinguishing feature is the sweet-smelling fragrance it emits. Since it has similarities to the marsh fern, New York fern, and silvery spleenwort, people often fail to notice its existence, and have difficulty distinguishing it from the other similar ferns. There is still some confusion today, as this species is relatively uncommon and its shape can be variable.

== Distribution ==
Coryphopteris simulata is a terrestrial plant native to Eastern Canada (New Brunswick, Nova Scotia, Ontario and Québec), the North-Central United States (Wisconsin), the Northeastern United States (Connecticut, Maine, Massachusetts, New Hampshire, New Jersey, New York, Pennsylvania, Rhode Island, Vermont and West Virginia) and the Southeastern United States (Alabama, Delaware, the District of Columbia, Maryland, North Carolina, Tennessee and Virginia). The isolated patch discovered in southwestern Wisconsin was far outside its expected distribution. Generally speaking, this plant is uncommon.

== Ecology ==
Coryphopteris simulata grows in shaded, marshy wetlands and bog areas such as cedar, spruce, larch, and sphagnum swamps. It likes to grow among bryophytes, particularly Sphagnum. It prefers and is most often found in moist, acidic soil that is soft and spongy.
