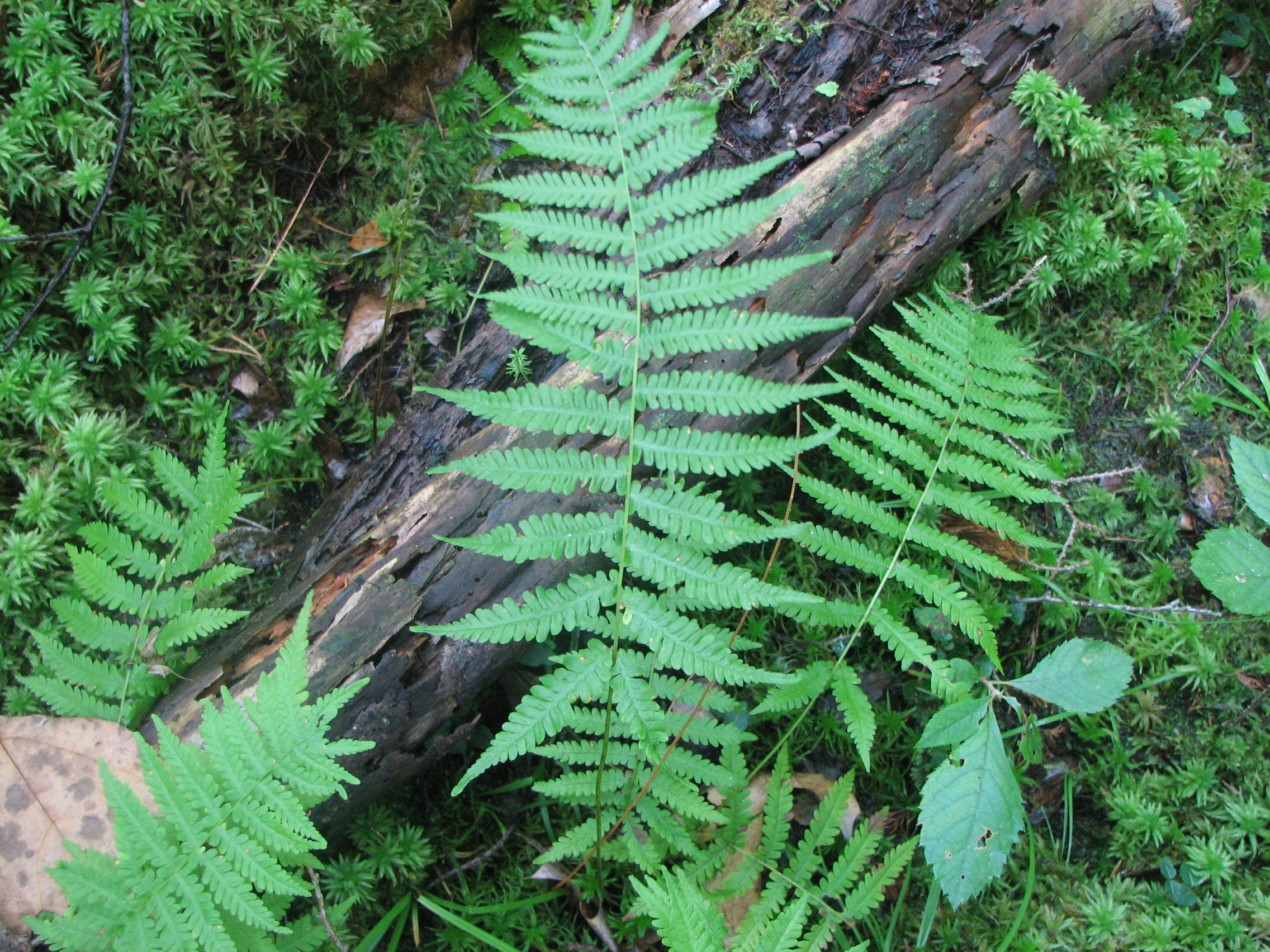
- Coryphopteris simulata in its natural habitat

Scientific classification
- Kingdom: Plantae
- Clade: Tracheophytes
- Division: Polypodiophyta
- Class: Polypodiopsida
- Order: Polypodiales
- Suborder: Aspleniineae
- Family: Thelypteridaceae
- Subfamily: Thelypteridoideae
- Genus: Coryphopteris; Holttum

Species
- See text.

Synonyms
- Parathelypteris sect. Melanostipes Ching; Thelypteris subg. Coryphopteris (Holttum) Fraser-Jenk.

= Coryphopteris =

Genus of ferns

Coryphopteris is a genus of ferns in the family Thelypteridaceae, subfamily Thelypteridoideae, in the Pteridophyte Phylogeny Group classification of 2016 (PPG I). In 2021, Fawcett & Smith expanded the scope of the genus to take in some of the species formerly placed in Parathelypteris.

== Species ==
As of October 2026, the Checklist of Ferns and Lycophytes of the World accepted the following 71 species:

- Coryphopteris andersonii Holttum
- Coryphopteris andreae Holttum
- Coryphopteris angulariloba (Ching) L.J.He & X.C.Zhang
- Coryphopteris arthrotricha Holttum
- Coryphopteris athyriocarpa (Copel.) Holttum
- Coryphopteris athyrioides Holttum
- Coryphopteris atjehensis Holttum
- Coryphopteris badia (Alderw.) Holttum
- Coryphopteris borealis Holttum
- Coryphopteris brevipilosa Holttum
- Coryphopteris castanea (Tagawa) Y.Hang Chang, Ebihara & L.Y.Kuo
- Coryphopteris caudata (Ching ex K.H.Shing) S.E.Fawc. & A.R.Sm.
- Coryphopteris changbaishanensis (Ching ex K.H.Shing) comb.ined., might belong to Amauropelta
- Coryphopteris chinensis (Ching) S.E.Fawc. & A.R.Sm.
- Coryphopteris chingii (K.H.Shing & J.F.Cheng) S.E.Fawc. & A.R.Sm.
- Coryphopteris coriacea (Brause) Holttum
- Coryphopteris diaphana (Brause) Holttum
- Coryphopteris diversisora (Copel.) Holttum
- Coryphopteris dura (Copel.) Holttum
- Coryphopteris engleriana (Brause) Holttum
- Coryphopteris fasciculata (E.Fourn.) Holttum
- Coryphopteris gymnopoda (Baker) Holttum
- Coryphopteris habbemensis (Copel.) Holttum
- Coryphopteris hirsutipes (C.B.Clarke) Holttum
- Coryphopteris holttumii Parris ined.
- Coryphopteris horizontalis (Rosenst.) Holttum
- Coryphopteris hubrechtensis Holttum
- Coryphopteris indochinensis (Christ) S.E.Fawc. & A.R.Sm.
- Coryphopteris inopinata Holttum
- Coryphopteris iwatsukii Holttum
- Coryphopteris japonica (Baker) L.J.He & X.C.Zhang
- Coryphopteris jiulianshanensis G.L.Xu & Z.G.Zhou
- Coryphopteris klossii (Ridl.) Holttum
- Coryphopteris kolombangarae Holttum
- Coryphopteris krayanensis (K.Iwats. & M.Kato) S.E.Fawc. & A.R.Sm.
- Coryphopteris lauterbachii (Brause) Holttum
- Coryphopteris ledermannii (Hieron.) Holttum
- Coryphopteris marquesensis (Lorence & K.R.Wood) Lorence & A.R.Sm.
- Coryphopteris meiobasis Holttum
- Coryphopteris microlepigera Holttum
- Coryphopteris multisora (C.Chr.) Holttum
- Coryphopteris musashiensis (Hiyama) S.E.Fawc. & A.R.Sm.
- Coryphopteris nigrescens (Ching ex K.H.Shing) S.E.Fawc. & A.R.Sm.
- Coryphopteris nipponica (Franch. & Sav.) S.E.Fawc. & A.R.Sm.
- Coryphopteris obtusata (Alderw.) Holttum
- Coryphopteris oligolepia (Alderw.) Holttum
- Coryphopteris pauciloba (Ching ex K.H.Shing) S.E.Fawc. & A.R.Sm.
- Coryphopteris pectiniformis (C.Chr.) Holttum
- Coryphopteris petelotii (Ching) Holttum
- Coryphopteris platyptera (Copel.) Holttum
- Coryphopteris plumosa (C.Chr.) Holttum
- Coryphopteris propria (Alderw.) Holttum
- Coryphopteris pubirachis (Baker) Holttum
- Coryphopteris quaylei (E.D.Br.) Holttum
- Coryphopteris quinlingensis (Ching ex K.H.Shing) comb.ined., might belong to Amauropelta
- Coryphopteris raiateana Holttum
- Coryphopteris seemannii Holttum
- Coryphopteris seramensis M.Kato
- Coryphopteris simulata (Davenp.) S.E.Fawc.
- Coryphopteris squamipes (Copel.) Holttum
- Coryphopteris stereophylla (Alderw.) Holttum
- Coryphopteris subbipinnata Holttum
- Coryphopteris subnigra (Brause) Holttum
- Coryphopteris sulawesica Holttum
- Coryphopteris sylva-nipponica (Ebihara & Nakato) S.E.Fawc., A.R.Sm. & Ebihara
- Coryphopteris tahanensis Holttum
- Coryphopteris tanggamensis Holttum
- Coryphopteris trichochlamys (Ching ex K.H.Shing) S.E.Fawc. & A.R.Sm.
- Coryphopteris unidentata (Bedd.) Holttum
- Coryphopteris viscosa (Baker) Holttum
- Coryphopteris vitiensis Holttum
