= Barnby Broad and Marshes =

Protected area in Suffolk, England

- Site of Special Scientific Interest
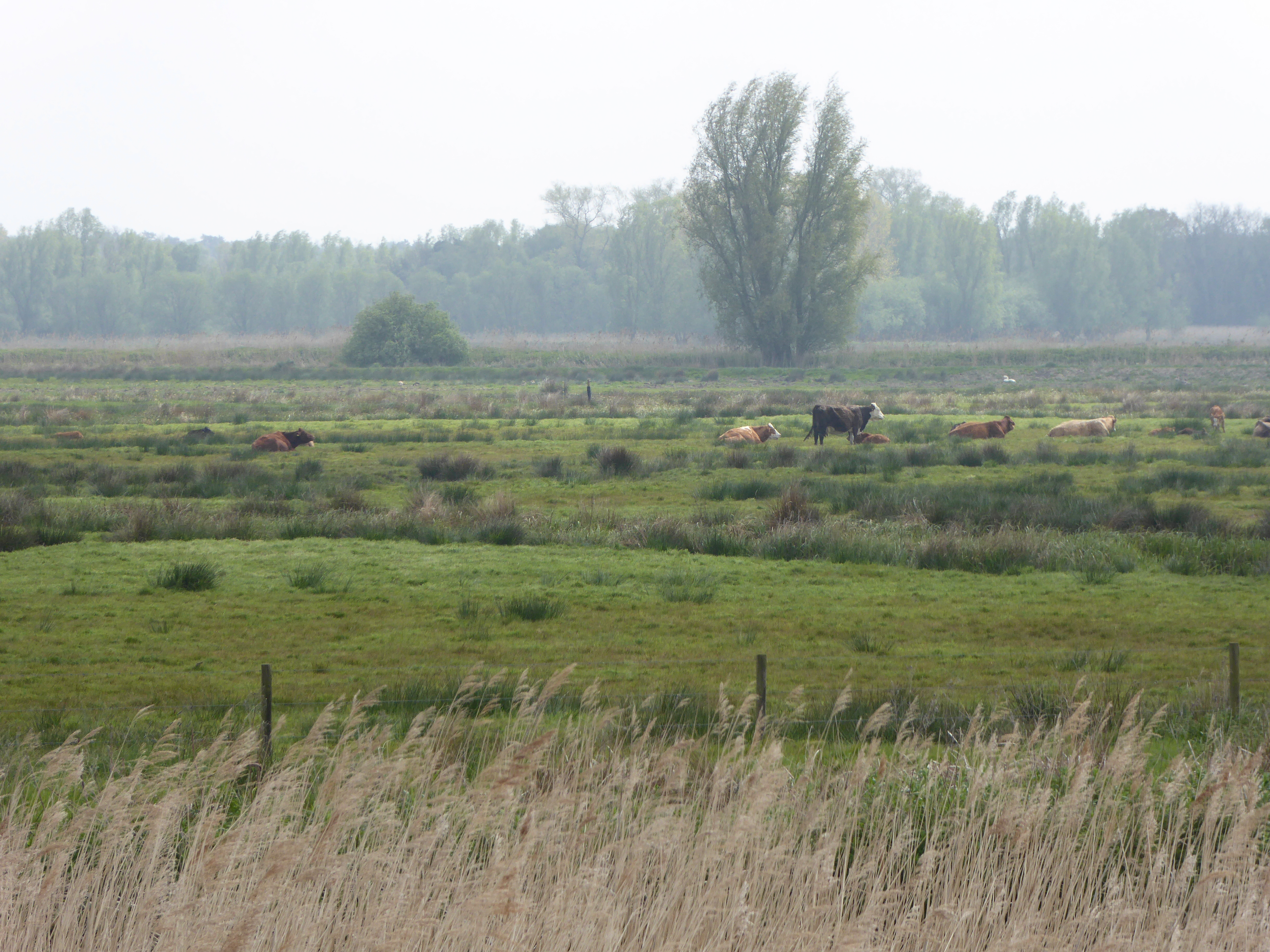
- Castle Marshes

- Barnby Broad and Marshes within Suffolk
- Location of Barnby Broad and Marshes.
- Area of search: Suffolk
- Grid reference: TM477907
- Coordinates: 52.469°N 1.647°E
- Interest: Biological
- Area: 189.62 hectares (1.9 km^{2}; 0.73 sq mi)
- Notification date: 1990

Barnby Broad and Marshes is a Site of Special Scientific Interest (SSSI) in the Waveney district of the English county of Suffolk. The site is 189.6 hectares (469 acres) in size. It is in the parishes of North Cove and Barnby, located between Beccles and Lowestoft in the north of the county. The site is bordered on its southern edge by the East Suffolk railway line and to the north by the River Waveney. It is a Special Area of Conservation, a Special Protection Area under the EC Birds Directive, and a Ramsar internationally important wetland site. There are two Suffolk Wildlife Trust nature reserves in the site, Castle Marshes and North Cove.

The site consists of a mixture of grazing marsh, carr woodland, fen and open water habitats stretching from the edge of the villages of Barnby and North Cove northwards across flood plains to the river. Much of the site floods seasonally and provides a habitat for a variety of bird species.

== Barnby Broad ==
Barnby Broad is an open water habitat around 2.5 hectares (6.2 acres) in size. It was formed as a result of medieval peat cutting in the same way as much of the Broads system. The broad is privately owned. In 2007 it was cleared of silt to provide an improved habitat with agricultural run-off being diverted from the Broad at the same time.

Flora found in and around the Broad includes the white water-lily Nymphaea alba, common reed Phragmites australis and the rarer tussock-sedge Carex appropinquata as well as species such as marsh arrowgrass Triglochin palustris and southern marsh-orchid Dactylorhiza praetermissa. It is surrounded by an area of mature Alder carr woodland with species such as Ash and Oak.

== Castle Marshes ==
Castle Marshes makes up the gazing marsh section of the SSSI. These cover the flood plain of the River Waveney from the edge of the wooded area to the south to the remains of Castle Mill in the north. The marshes are drained with dykes and are managed using traditional cattle grazing. Rare species breeding here include the Norfolk hawker. The protected fen raft spider has been reintroduced onto the site as part of a project organised by Natural England and Suffolk Wildlife Trust and partly funded by a grant from the BBC Wildlife Fund.

The marshes are flooded in winter, providing overwintering habitat for bird species such as teal, shoveler and gadwall and breeding grounds for lapwing and common redshank. Bird of prey species such as marsh harrier and hobby are also present.

Much of the marshland area on the site is owned and managed as a nature reserve by the Suffolk Wildlife Trust. This area is 71 hectares (180 acres) in area and extends along the southern backs of the Waveney towards Lowestoft outside the SSSI area. Access to the reserve is restricted, although public footpaths run along the river wall.

== North Cove Nature Reserve ==
A smaller area of 38.8 hectares (96 acres) is privately owned but managed by Suffolk Wildlife Trust as a nature reserve. This area includes a mix of woodland, pools and marshland habitats and was previously a game reserve. The nationally scarce marsh fern is one key species, whilst woodcock and the Norfolk hawker dragonfly are both found around this site.

== See also ==
- List of Sites of Special Scientific Interest in Suffolk
- Suffolk Wildlife Trust
