= Archigrammitis friderici-et-pauli =

Scientific classification
- Kingdom: Plantae
- Clade: Tracheophytes
- Division: Polypodiophyta
- Class: Polypodiopsida
- Order: Polypodiales
- Suborder: Polypodiineae
- Family: Polypodiaceae
- Genus: Archigrammitis
- Species: A. friderici-et-pauli

Binomial name
- Archigrammitis friderici-et-pauli (Christ) Parris

Synonyms
- Grammitis friderici-et-pauli (Christ) Copel.; Grammitis calcipunctata (Copel.) Copel.; Polypodium calcipunctatum Copel.; Polypodium friderici-et-pauli Christ (1896), non Christ (1904)

Species of fern

Archigrammitis friderici-et-pauli is a species of fern in the family Polypodiaceae, subfamily Grammitidoideae, according to the Pteridophyte Phylogeny Group classification of 2016 (PPG I). It is native to Borneo and Sulawesi.

== Taxonomy ==
Konrad H. Christ first described this species in 1896, under the name Polypodium friderici-et-pauli. This is the basionym of Archigrammitis friderici-et-pauli, published by Barbara S. Parris in 2013. Christ caused some confusion over the use of the epithet friderici-et-pauli. The previous year, 1895, he had published the name Davallia friderici-et-pauli. This is the basionym of the accepted name Acrosorus friderici-et-pauli, published by Edwin Copeland in 1906. In 1904, Christ again published the name Polypodium friderici-et-pauli, this time making reference to Davallia. Hence Polypodium friderici-et-pauli Christ (1896) is a synonym of this species, whereas Polypodium friderici-et-pauli Christ (1904) is an illegitimate synonym of Acrosorus friderici-et-pauli.
