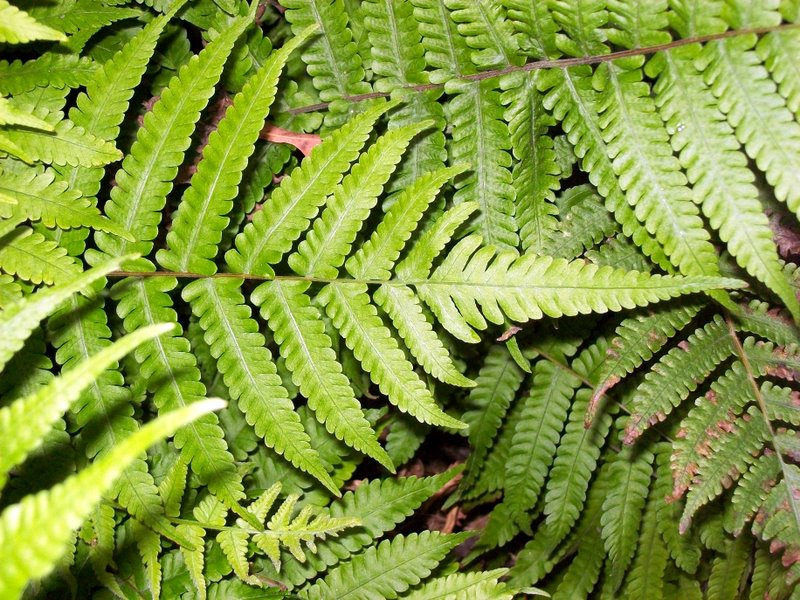
- Christella dentata

Scientific classification
- Kingdom: Plantae
- Clade: Tracheophytes
- Division: Polypodiophyta
- Class: Polypodiopsida
- Order: Polypodiales
- Suborder: Aspleniineae
- Family: Thelypteridaceae
- Subfamily: Thelypteridoideae
- Genus: Christella; H.Lév.

Species
- See text.

Synonyms
- Christella sect. Pelazoneuron Holttum; Thelypteris sect. Christella (H.Lév.) Fraser-Jenk.

= Christella =

Genus of ferns

Christella is a genus of around 70-80 species of ferns in the subfamily Thelypteridoideae of the family Thelypteridaceae in the Pteridophyte Phylogeny Group classification of 2016 (PPG I). Other sources sink Christella into a very broadly defined genus Thelypteris. The genus was named after Konrad H. Christ, a Swiss botanist. The distribution of these plants is mostly in the tropics and sub tropical areas. An Australian example is C. dentata.

== Species ==
As of January 2020, the Checklist of Ferns and Lycophytes of the World accepted the following species:

- Christella abrupta (C.Presl) A.R.Sm.
- Christella acuminata (Houtt.) Holttum
- Christella adenopelta Holttum
- Christella afzelii (C.Chr.) Holttum
- Christella albicaulis (Fée) comb. ined.
- Christella altissima Holttum
- Christella appendiculata (Wall. ex C.Presl) Holttum
- Christella arida (D.Don) Holttum
- Christella augescens (Link) Pic.Serm.
- Christella balansae (Ching) Holttum
- Christella berroi (C.Chr.) Salino & A.R.Sm.
- Christella boninensis (Kodama ex Koidz.) Holttum
- Christella boydiae (D.C.Eaton) Holttum
- Christella buchananii (Schelpe) J.P.Roux
- Christella burmanica (Ching) Holttum
- Christella burundensis Pic.Serm.
- Christella calcarea Glenny
- Christella callensii (Alston) Holttum
- Christella calvescens (Ching) Holttum
- Christella carolinensis (Hosok.) Holttum
- Christella chaseana (Schelpe) Holttum
- Christella clarkei (Bedd.) Holttum
- Christella clivalis (A.R.Sm.) A.R.Sm.
- Christella connexa (Kuhn ex Baker) comb. ined.
- Christella conspersa (Schrad.) Á.Löve & D.Löve
- Christella cretacea (A.R.Sm.) Á.Löve & D.Löve
- Christella crinipes (Hook.) Holttum
- Christella cyatheoides (Kaulf.) Holttum
- Christella darainensis Rakotondr.
- Christella dentata (Forssk.) Brownsey & Jermy
- Christella distans (Hook.) Holttum
- Christella ensifera (Tagawa) Holttum ex C.M.Kuo et al.
- Christella evoluta (C.B.Clarke ex Bedd.) Holttum
- Christella friesii (Brause) Holttum
- Christella fukienensis (Ching) Holttum
- Christella goedenii (Rosenst.) comb. ined.
- Christella gretheri (W.H.Wagner) Holttum
- Christella guamensis Holttum
- Christella gueinziana (Mett.) Holttum
- Christella guineensis (Christ) Holttum
- Christella gustavii (Bedd.) Holttum
- Christella harveyi (Mett. ex Kuhn) Holttum
- Christella hokouensis (Ching) Holttum
- Christella jaculosa (Christ) Holttum
- Christella kendujharensis S.K.Behera & S.K.Barik
- Christella lanosa (C.Chr.) Á.Löve & D.Löve
- Christella latipinna (Benth.) H.Lév.
- Christella lebeufii (Baker) Holttum
- Christella meeboldii (Rosenst.) Holttum
- Christella microbasis (Baker) Holttum
- Christella minima Holttum
- Christella modesta Holttum
- Christella moluccana M.Kato
- Christella multiauriculata Punetha
- Christella multifrons (C.Chr.) Holttum
- Christella namburensis (Bedd.) Holttum
- Christella nana Holttum
- Christella normalis (C.Chr.) Holttum
- Christella oblancifolia (Tagawa) comb. ined.
- Christella oligophylla (Maxon) Brade
- Christella ovata (R.P.St. John) Á.Löve & D.Löve
- Christella pacifica Holttum
- Christella papilio (C.Hope) Holttum
- Christella parasitica (L.) H.Lév.
- Christella patens (Sw.) Holttum
- Christella peekelii (Alderw.) Holttum
- Christella perpubescens (Alston) Holttum
- Christella prolixa (Willd.) Holttum
- Christella pseudogueinziana (Bonap.) J.P.Roux
- Christella puberula (Baker) Á.Löve & D.Löve
- Christella quadrangularis (Fée) Holttum
- Christella rupicola (Hosok.) Holttum
- Christella scaberula (Ching) Holttum
- Christella schizotis (Hook.) A.R.Sm.
- Christella semisagittata (Roxb. ex Griff.) Holttum
- Christella serra (Sw.) Holttum
- Christella subdentata Holttum
- Christella subelata (Baker) Holttum
- Christella subjuncta (Baker) Holttum
- Christella subpubescens (Blume) Holttum
- Christella timorensis Holttum
- Christella tuerckheiimii (Donn. Sm.) comb. ined.
- Christella wailele (Flynn) D.D.Palmer
