= North Cove Nature Reserve =

Nature reserve in Suffolk, England

Coordinates: 52.457°N 1.636°E

North Cove
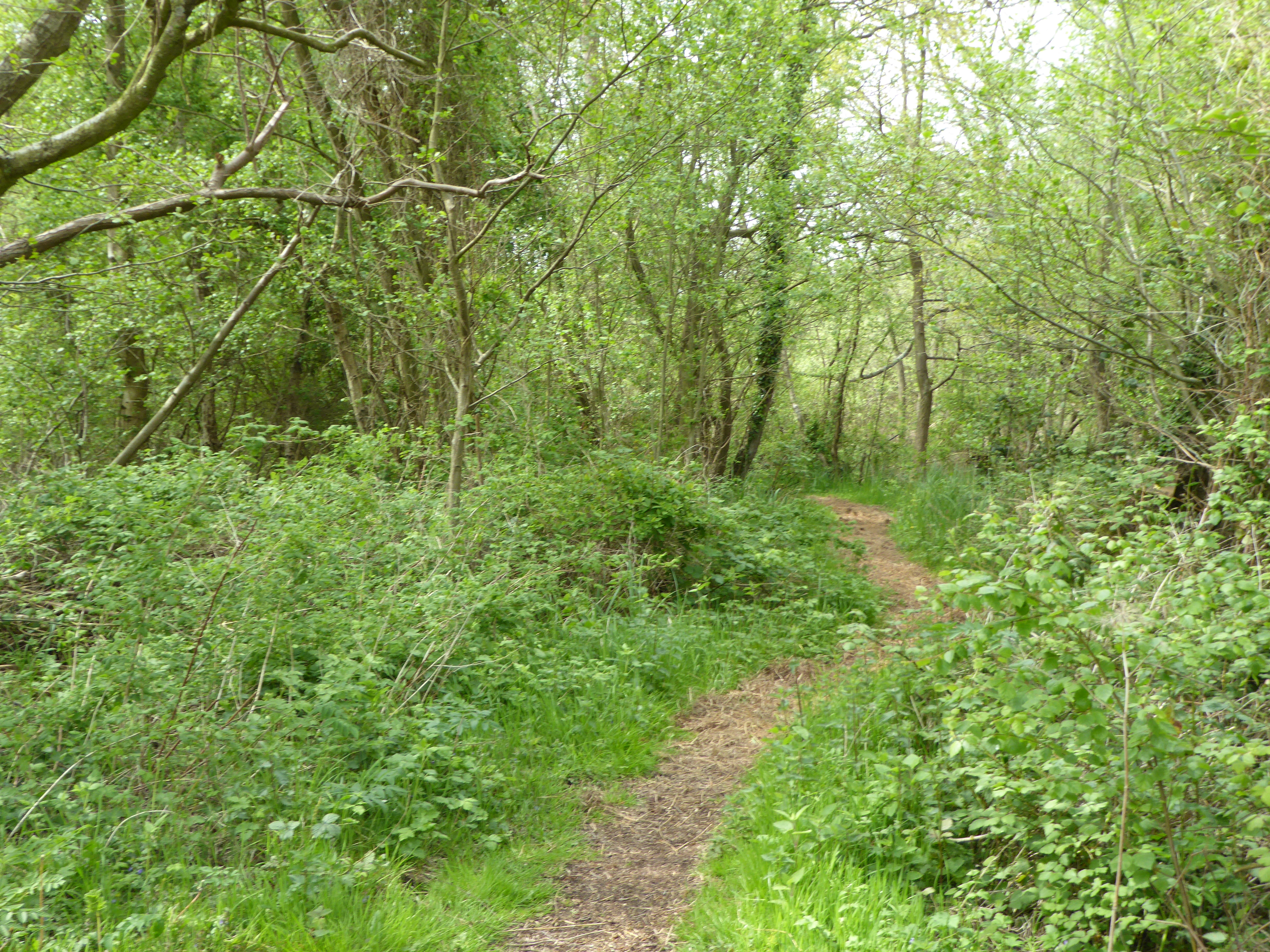
- Interactive map of North Cove
- Type: Nature reserve
- Location: Beccles, Suffolk
- OS grid: TM471905
- Area: 15.5 hectares (38 acres)
- Manager: Suffolk Wildlife Trust

North Cove is a 15.5-hectare (38-acre) nature reserve between Beccles and Lowestoft in Suffolk. It is managed by the owner and Beccles Bird Society, is part of the Barnby Broad and Marshes Site of Special Scientific Interest the Broadland Ramsar internationally important wetland site, the Broadland Special Protection Area under the European Union Directive on the Conservation of Wild Birds, and The Broads Special Area of Conservation.

The site has wet woodland, grazing marsh, ponds and dykes. There are birds such as sparrowhawks, woodcocks, redpolls, siskins and the three species of woodpecker. Flora include opposite-leaved golden-saxifrage, bog pimpernel and the nationally scarce marsh fern.

There is access from a footpath between Barnby and the Angles Way.
