= Amauropelta straminea =

Conservation status
- Vulnerable (IUCN 3.1)

Scientific classification
- Kingdom: Plantae
- Clade: Tracheophytes
- Division: Polypodiophyta
- Class: Polypodiopsida
- Order: Polypodiales
- Suborder: Aspleniineae
- Family: Thelypteridaceae
- Genus: Amauropelta
- Species: A. straminea

Binomial name
- Amauropelta straminea (A.R.Sm.) Salino & T.E.Almeida

Synonyms
- Nephrodium stramineum Sodiro; Thelypteris chimboracensis A.R.Sm.; Dryopteris pachyrachis var. straminea (Sodiro) C.Chr.

Species of fern

Amauropelta straminea, synonym Thelypteris chimboracensis, is a species of fern in the family Thelypteridaceae. It is endemic to Ecuador. Its natural habitat is subtropical or tropical moist montane forests. It is threatened by habitat loss.
