= Amauropelta elegantula =

Conservation status
- Vulnerable (IUCN 3.1)

Scientific classification
- Kingdom: Plantae
- Clade: Tracheophytes
- Division: Polypodiophyta
- Class: Polypodiopsida
- Order: Polypodiales
- Suborder: Aspleniineae
- Family: Thelypteridaceae
- Genus: Amauropelta
- Species: A. elegantula

Binomial name
- Amauropelta elegantula (Sodiro) Salino & T.E.Almeida

Synonyms
- Dryopteris elegantula (Sodiro) C.Chr.; Lastrea elegantula (Sodiro) Copel.; Nephrodium elegantulum Sodiro; Thelypteris elegantula (Sodiro) Alston

Species of fern

Amauropelta elegantula, synonym Thelypteris elegantula, is a species of fern in the family Thelypteridaceae. It is native to Colombia and Ecuador. Its natural habitat is subtropical or tropical moist montane forests. It is threatened by habitat loss.
