= Amauropelta dodsonii =

Conservation status
- Vulnerable (IUCN 3.1)

Scientific classification
- Kingdom: Plantae
- Clade: Tracheophytes
- Division: Polypodiophyta
- Class: Polypodiopsida
- Order: Polypodiales
- Suborder: Aspleniineae
- Family: Thelypteridaceae
- Genus: Amauropelta
- Species: A. dodsonii

Binomial name
- Amauropelta dodsonii (A.R.Sm.) Salino & T.E.Almeida

Synonyms
- Thelypteris dodsonii A.R.Sm.

Species of fern

Amauropelta dodsonii, synonym Thelypteris dodsonii, is a species of fern in the family Thelypteridaceae. It is endemic to Ecuador. Its natural habitats are subtropical or tropical moist lowland forests and subtropical or tropical moist montane forests. It is threatened by habitat loss.
