= Amauropelta appressa =

Conservation status
- Vulnerable (IUCN 3.1)

Scientific classification
- Kingdom: Plantae
- Clade: Tracheophytes
- Division: Polypodiophyta
- Class: Polypodiopsida
- Order: Polypodiales
- Suborder: Aspleniineae
- Family: Thelypteridaceae
- Genus: Amauropelta
- Species: A. appressa

Binomial name
- Amauropelta appressa (A.R.Sm.) Salino & T.E.Almeida

Synonyms
- Thelypteris appressa A.R.Sm.

Species of fern

Amauropelta appressa, synonym Thelypteris appressa, is a species of fern in the family Thelypteridaceae. It is endemic to Ecuador. Its natural habitats are subtropical or tropical moist lowland forests and subtropical or tropical moist montane forests. It is threatened by habitat loss.
