= Amauropelta fluminalis =

Conservation status
- Near Threatened (IUCN 3.1)

Scientific classification
- Kingdom: Plantae
- Clade: Tracheophytes
- Division: Polypodiophyta
- Class: Polypodiopsida
- Order: Polypodiales
- Suborder: Aspleniineae
- Family: Thelypteridaceae
- Genus: Amauropelta
- Species: A. fluminalis

Binomial name
- Amauropelta fluminalis (A.R.Sm.) Salino & T.E.Almeida

Synonyms
- Thelypteris fluminalis A.R.Sm.

Species of fern

Amauropelta fluminalis, synonym Thelypteris fluminalis, is a species of fern in the family Thelypteridaceae. It is native to Colombia and Ecuador.

Its natural habitats are subtropical or tropical moist lowland forests and rivers. It is threatened by habitat loss.
