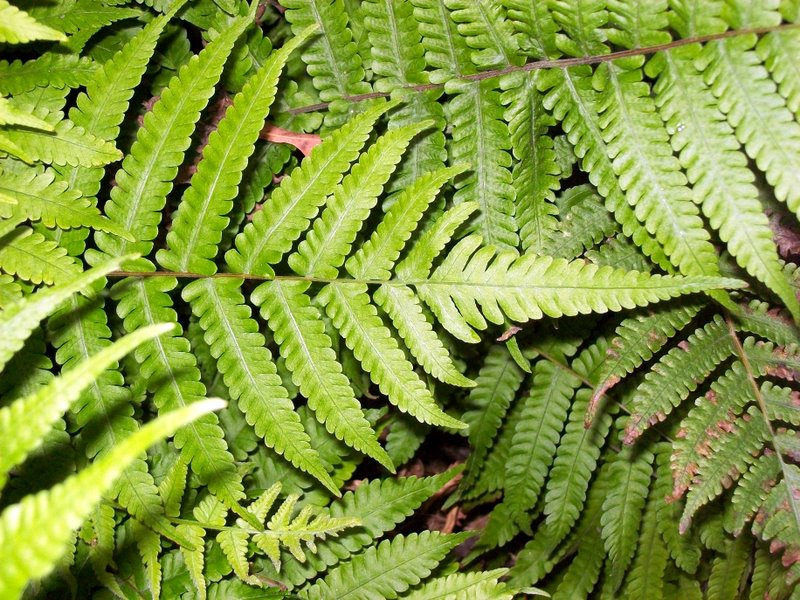
- Christella dentata at Chatswood West, Australia

Scientific classification
- Kingdom: Plantae
- Clade: Tracheophytes
- Division: Polypodiophyta
- Class: Polypodiopsida
- Order: Polypodiales
- Suborder: Aspleniineae
- Family: Thelypteridaceae
- Genus: Christella
- Species: C. dentata

Binomial name
- Christella dentata (Forssk.) Brownsey & Jermy

Synonyms
- Cyclosorus nymphalis (G.Forst.) Ching

= Christella dentata =

Species of fern

Christella dentata is a small fern with widespread distribution in Australia and islands in the south Pacific Ocean. There are many local common names. In New South Wales it grows north from the southern Illawarra region and is known as binung.

Found on the margins of rainforest, by streams or in more open forests with adequate moisture. Sori are circular in shape, with a hairy closed covering.

It was the first species of fern to become naturalised on the Hawaiian Islands, recorded initially in Oahu in 1887 and now found on all major islands there. There it interbreeds with the local species C. cyatheoides, with the resultant hybrid offspring sterile.

Christella dentata is an edible fern, and also a folk remedy for skin diseases. Pharmacological study found that water extract of the fern was as toxic as the anticancer drug 5-fluorouracil against human chronic myelogenous leukemia cell line (K562).
