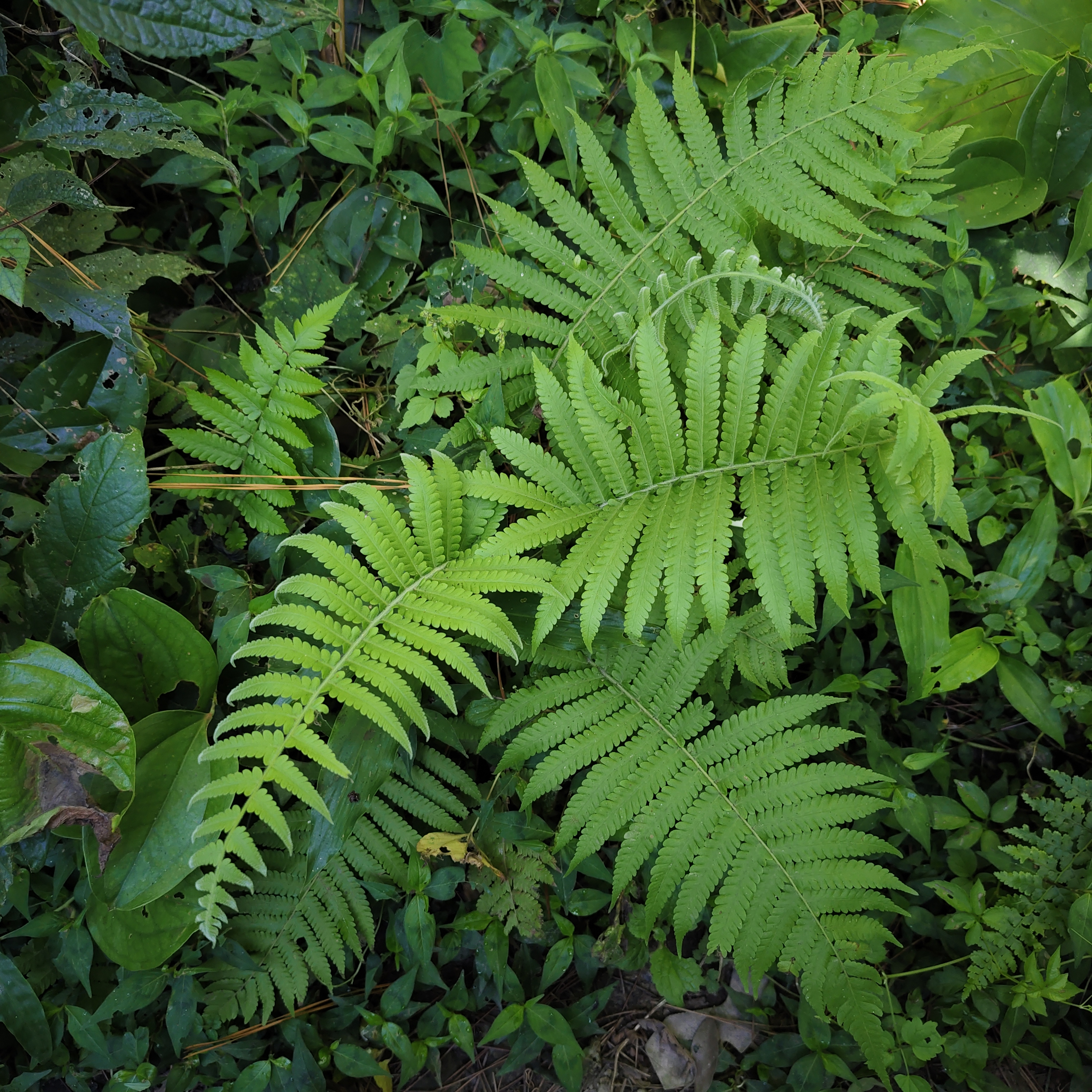
- Christella parasitica in Longtan District, Taoyuan City, Taiwan

Scientific classification
- Kingdom: Plantae
- Clade: Tracheophytes
- Division: Polypodiophyta
- Class: Polypodiopsida
- Order: Polypodiales
- Suborder: Aspleniineae
- Family: Thelypteridaceae
- Genus: Christella
- Species: C. parasitica

Binomial name
- Christella parasitica (L.) H.Lév.

Synonyms
- Thelypteris parasitica; Cyclosorus parasiticus

= Christella parasitica =

Parasitic maiden fern

Species of fern

Christella parasitica is a species of fern in the Thelypteridaceae family. It is a widespread species found in many parts of the world. In Australia, this fern is recorded from Queensland, Norfolk Island and northern New South Wales. Chimpanzees in the Budongo Forest, Uganda have been observed self-medicating with Christella parasitica when they are injured.
