= Amauropelta semilunata =

Conservation status
- Least Concern (IUCN 3.1)

Scientific classification
- Kingdom: Plantae
- Clade: Tracheophytes
- Division: Polypodiophyta
- Class: Polypodiopsida
- Order: Polypodiales
- Suborder: Aspleniineae
- Family: Thelypteridaceae
- Genus: Amauropelta
- Species: A. semilunata

Binomial name
- Amauropelta semilunata (Sodiro) Salino & T.E.Almeida

Synonyms
- Dryopteris semilunata (Sodiro) C.Chr.; Nephrodium semilunatum Sodiro; Thelypteris semilunata (Sodiro) A.R.Sm.

Species of fern

Amauropelta semilunata, synonym Thelypteris semilunata, is a species of fern in the family Thelypteridaceae. It is endemic to Ecuador. Its natural habitat is subtropical or tropical moist montane forests.
