= Amauropelta campii =

Conservation status
- Vulnerable (IUCN 3.1)

Scientific classification
- Kingdom: Plantae
- Clade: Tracheophytes
- Division: Polypodiophyta
- Class: Polypodiopsida
- Order: Polypodiales
- Suborder: Aspleniineae
- Family: Thelypteridaceae
- Genus: Amauropelta
- Species: A. campii

Binomial name
- Amauropelta campii (A.R.Sm.) Salino & T. E. Almeida

Synonyms
- Thelypteris campii A.R.Sm.

Species of fern

Amauropelta campii, synonym Thelypteris campii, is a species of fern in the family Thelypteridaceae. It is endemic to Ecuador. Its natural habitats are subtropical or tropical moist lowland forests and subtropical or tropical moist montane forests. It is threatened by habitat loss.
