= Amauropelta conformis =

Conservation status
- Vulnerable (IUCN 3.1)

Scientific classification
- Kingdom: Plantae
- Clade: Tracheophytes
- Division: Polypodiophyta
- Class: Polypodiopsida
- Order: Polypodiales
- Suborder: Aspleniineae
- Family: Thelypteridaceae
- Genus: Amauropelta
- Species: A. conformis

Binomial name
- Amauropelta conformis (Sodiro) Salino & T.E.Almeida

Synonyms
- Dryopteris conformis (Sodiro) C.Chr.; Nephrodium conforme Sodiro; Thelypteris conformis (Sodiro) A.R.Sm.

Species of fern

Amauropelta conformis, synonym Thelypteris conformis, is a species of fern in the family Thelypteridaceae. It is endemic to Ecuador. Its natural habitat is subtropical or tropical moist montane forests. It is threatened by habitat loss.
