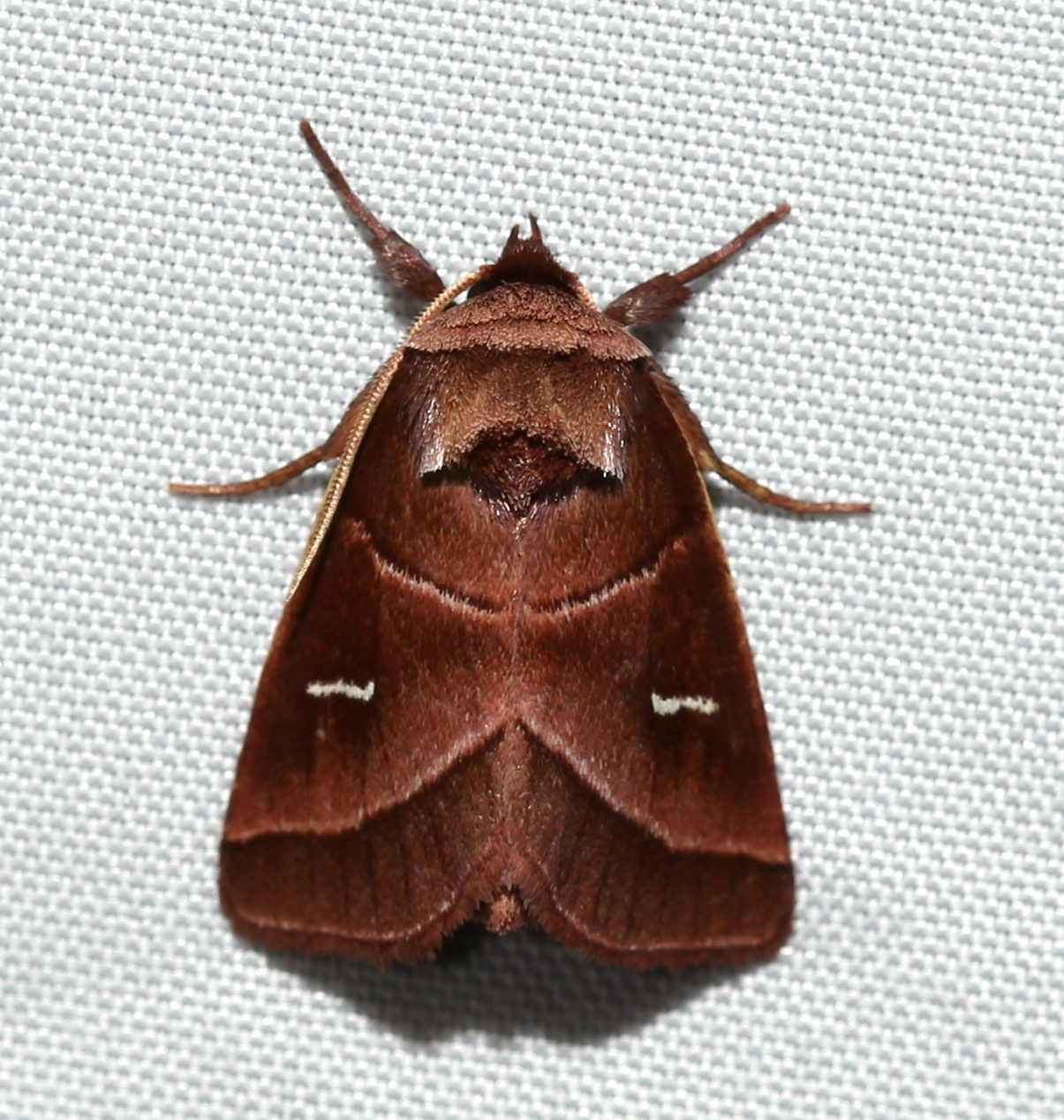

Scientific classification
- Kingdom: Animalia
- Phylum: Arthropoda
- Class: Insecta
- Order: Lepidoptera
- Superfamily: Noctuoidea
- Family: Noctuidae
- Genus: Fagitana
- Species: F. littera

Binomial name
- Fagitana littera (Guenée, 1852)

= Fagitana littera =

Species of moth

Fagitana littera, the marsh fern moth, is a moth of the family Noctuidae. It is listed as a species of special concern in the US state of Connecticut. It was described by Achille Guenée in 1852.

== Larval foods ==
Thelypteris palustris is reported as the only known host plant for the species.
