= Amauropelta subtilis =

Conservation status
- Vulnerable (IUCN 3.1)

Scientific classification
- Kingdom: Plantae
- Clade: Tracheophytes
- Division: Polypodiophyta
- Class: Polypodiopsida
- Order: Polypodiales
- Suborder: Aspleniineae
- Family: Thelypteridaceae
- Genus: Amauropelta
- Species: A. subtilis

Binomial name
- Amauropelta subtilis A.R.Sm.

Synonyms
- Thelypteris subtilis A.R.Sm.

Species of fern

Amauropelta subtilis, synonym Thelypteris subtilis, is a species of fern in the family Thelypteridaceae. It is endemic to Ecuador. It was found in the Andean forest. Its natural habitat is subtropical or tropical moist montane forests. It is threatened by habitat destruction, but apart from that, there are no other known threats.
