= Fagitana =

Scientific classification
- Kingdom: Animalia
- Phylum: Arthropoda
- Class: Insecta
- Order: Lepidoptera
- Superfamily: Noctuoidea
- Family: Noctuidae
- Genus: Fagitana; Walker, 1865

Genus of moths

Fagitana is a genus of moths of the family Noctuidae.

== Species ==
- Fagitana gigantea (Draudt, 1950)
- Fagitana littera (Guenée, 1852)
