= Castle Marshes =

Nature reserve in Suffolk, England

Coordinates: 52.46°N 1.63°E

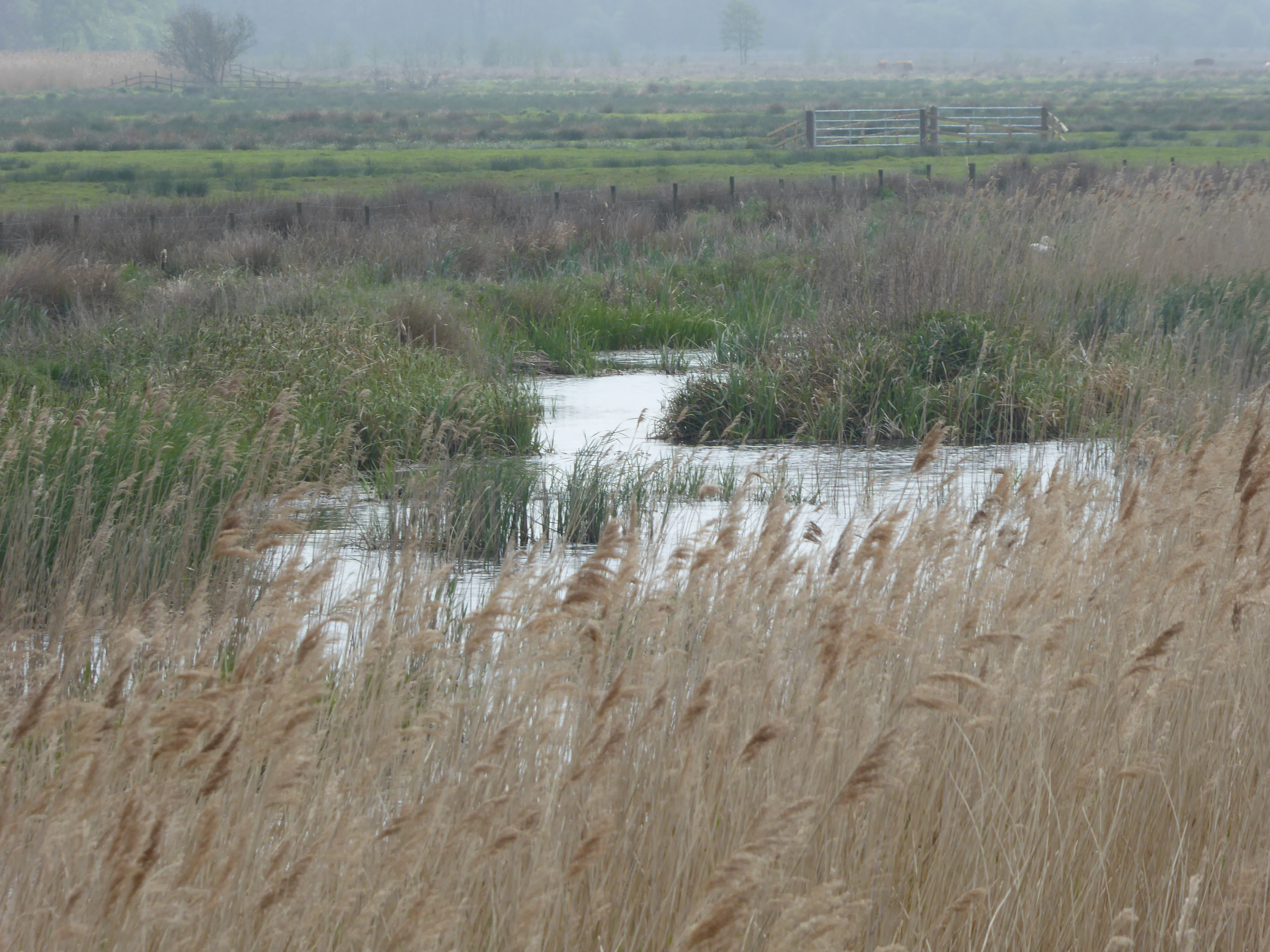
- Interactive map of Castle Marshes
- Type: Nature reserve
- Location: Lowestoft, Suffolk
- OS grid: TM470911
- Area: 71 hectares (180 acres)
- Manager: Suffolk Wildlife Trust

Castle Marshes is a 71 hectare nature reserve west of Lowestoft in Suffolk. It is managed by the Suffolk Wildlife Trust. It is part of the Barnby Broad and Marshes Site of Special Scientific Interest the Broadland Ramsar internationally important wetland site, the Broadland Special Protection Area under the European Union Directive on the Conservation of Wild Birds, and The Broads Special Area of Conservation.

The site has fen, freshwater dykes and grazing marshes. Resident wildfowl include wigeons, gadwalls, teals and shovelers are joined in winter by migrants when the marshes are flooded. Scarce chaser and the nationally rare Norfolk hawker dragonflies breed on the site, and there are blue-tailed damselflies.

There is no public access but the Angles Way footpath runs along the northern boundary.
