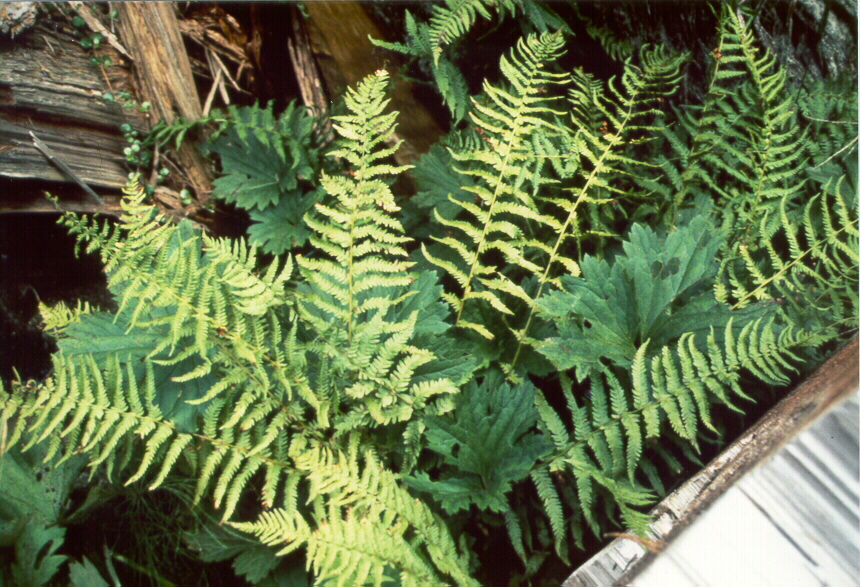
- Parathelypteris nevadensis, Clearwater National Forest, United States

Scientific classification
- Kingdom: Plantae
- Clade: Tracheophytes
- Division: Polypodiophyta
- Class: Polypodiopsida
- Order: Polypodiales
- Suborder: Aspleniineae
- Family: Thelypteridaceae
- Subfamily: Thelypteridoideae
- Genus: Parathelypteris (H.Ito) Ching

Species
- See text.

Synonyms
- Thelypteris sect. Parathelypteris H.Itô; Thelypteris subg. Parathelypteris (H.Itô) R.M.Tryon & A.F.Tryon; Wagneriopteris Á.Löve & D.Löve; Thelypteris subg. Euthelypteris Ching; Thelypteris subg. Parathelypteris R.M.Tryon & A.F.Tryon

= Parathelypteris =

Genus of ferns

Parathelypteris is a genus of ferns in the family Thelypteridaceae, subfamily Thelypteridoideae, in the Pteridophyte Phylogeny Group classification of 2016 (PPG I). Other sources sink Parathelypteris into a very broadly defined genus Thelypteris.

== Species ==
As of January 2020, the Checklist of Ferns and Lycophytes of the World accepted the following species:

- Parathelypteris angustifrons (Miq.) Ching
- Parathelypteris beddomei (Baker) Ching
- Parathelypteris borealis (Hara) K.H.Shing
- Parathelypteris caudata Ching ex K.H.Shing
- Parathelypteris changbaishanensis Ching ex K.H.Shing
- Parathelypteris chinensis (Ching) Ching
- Parathelypteris chingii K.H.Shing & J.F.Cheng
- Parathelypteris cystopteroides (D.C.Eaton) Ching
- Parathelypteris glanduligera (Kunze) Ching
- Parathelypteris grammitoides (Christ) Ching
- Parathelypteris indochinensis (Ching) Ching
- Parathelypteris miyagii (H.Itô) Nakaike
- Parathelypteris nevadensis (Baker) Holttum
- Parathelypteris nigrescens Ching ex K.H.Shing
- Parathelypteris nipponica (Franch. & Sav.) Ching
- Parathelypteris noveboracensis (L.) Ching
- Parathelypteris pauciloba Ching ex K.H.Shing
- Parathelypteris quinlingensis Ching ex K.H.Shing
- Parathelypteris rechingeri Holttum
- Parathelypteris serrulata (Ching) Ching
- Parathelypteris trichochlamys Ching ex K.H.Shing
