= Amauropelta rosenstockii =

Conservation status
- Vulnerable (IUCN 3.1)

Scientific classification
- Kingdom: Plantae
- Clade: Tracheophytes
- Division: Polypodiophyta
- Class: Polypodiopsida
- Order: Polypodiales
- Suborder: Aspleniineae
- Family: Thelypteridaceae
- Genus: Amauropelta
- Species: A. rosenstockii

Binomial name
- Amauropelta rosenstockii (C.Chr.) Salino & T.E.Almeida

Synonyms
- Dryopteris rosenstockii C.Chr.; Lastrea rosenstockii (C.Chr.) Copel.; Thelypteris rosenstockii (C.Chr.) R.M.Tryon

Species of fern

Amauropelta rosenstockii, synonym Thelypteris rosenstockii, is a species of fern in the family Thelypteridaceae. It is native to Colombia and Ecuador. Its natural habitat is subtropical or tropical moist montane forests. It is threatened by habitat loss.
