= Hermann Christ =

Swiss botanist (1833–1933)

Konrad Hermann Heinrich Christ
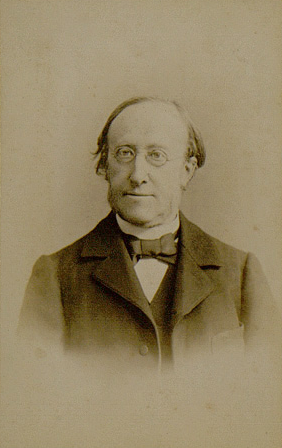
- Portrait photograph of Hermann Christ, University of Coimbra
- Born: December 12, 1833; Basel, Switzerland
- Died: November 23, 1933 (aged 99); Riehen, Switzerland
- Other name: H. Christ
- Education: University of Basel; University of Berlin
- Known for: Specializing in pteridology; extensive publications on plant geography, systematics, and history of botany
- Scientific career
- Fields: Pteridology (ferns), Plant geography, Systematics, History of botany
- Workplaces: Basel (lawyer and notary)
- Thesis: (1856)
- Author abbrev. (botany): Christ

Konrad Hermann Heinrich Christ (12 December 1833, in Basel – 23 November 1933, in Riehen) was a Swiss botanist who specialized in pteridology (ferns). The standard author abbreviation Christ is used to indicate this person as the author when citing a botanical name.

He studied law at the universities of Basel and Berlin, receiving his doctorate at Basel in 1856. From 1869 to 1908 he worked as a lawyer and notary in Basel. In his spare time and during retirement he engaged in botanical pursuits, publishing over 300 works on topics such as plant geography, systematics and history of botany.

The fern genus Christella is named in his honour.

== Publications ==
- Das Pflanzenleben der Schweiz, 1879
- Christ, Hermann: "Die Botrychium-Arten des Austral Amerika." Arkiv for Botanik, Vol. 6, NO. 3. Stockholm, Sweden. 1906. German.
- Christ, Hermann: Die Farnkräuter der Erde [The Ferns of the World], Beschreibende Darstellung der Geschlechter und wichtigeren Arten der Farnpflanzen mit besonderer Berücksichtigung der exotischen. Gustav Fischer, Jena. 1897. xii,388pp, 292 text-illustrations, 260mm. German.
- Christ, Hermann: Die Farnkräuter der Schweiz [The Ferns of Switzerland]. Beiträge zur Kryptogamenflora der Schweiz, Vol. 1, Part 2. Bern, Switzerland. 1900. German.
- Christ, Hermann: Die Geographie der Farne [Geography of the Ferns]. Jena. 1910. German.
- Christ, Hermann: "Über die australen Polystichum-Arten." Arkiv for Botanik, Vol. 4, no. 12. Stockholm, Sweden. 1905. German.
