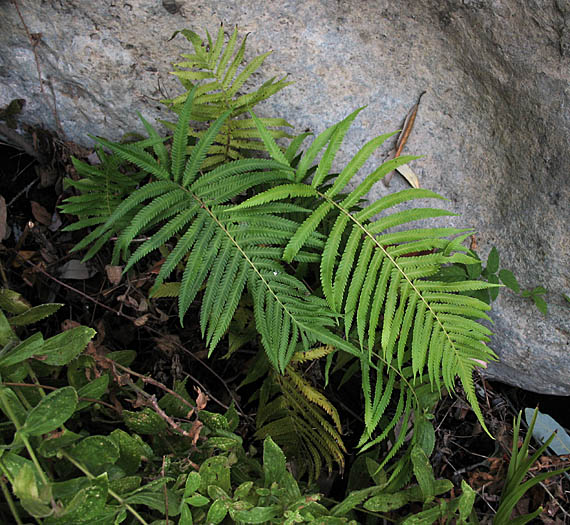
- Christella puberula var. sonorensis

Conservation status
- Secure (NatureServe)

Scientific classification
- Kingdom: Plantae
- Clade: Tracheophytes
- Division: Polypodiophyta
- Class: Polypodiopsida
- Order: Polypodiales
- Suborder: Aspleniineae
- Family: Thelypteridaceae
- Genus: Christella
- Species: C. puberula

Binomial name
- Christella puberula Á.Löve & D.Löve

Synonyms
- Aspidium orizabae Fée; Aspidium puberulum (Baker) Fée; Dryopteris augescens var. puberula (Baker) C.Chr.; Dryopteris feei C.Chr.; Dryopteris orizabae (Fée) C.Chr.; Dryopteris puberula (Baker) Kuntze; Filix-mas augescens var. puberula (Baker) Farw.; Lastrea orizabae (Fée) Moore; Nephrodium puberulum Baker; Thelypteris augescens var. puberula (Baker) Munz & I.M.Johnst.; Thelypteris feei (C.Chr.) Moxley; Thelypteris orizabae (Fée) Christenh.; Thelypteris puberula (Baker) Morton

= Christella puberula =

Species of fern

Christella puberula, synonym Thelypteris puberula, is a species of fern known by the common name showy maiden fern. The variety Ch. puberula var. sonorensis is known by the common name Sonoran maiden fern.

It is native to southwestern North America and Central America, from the foothills and deserts of California and Arizona south through Mexico to Costa Rica. It grows in canyons, streambanks, and seeps in several types of habitat. It is found at 50–550 metres (160–1,800 ft) in elevation.

== Description ==
Christella puberula produces a number of regularly shaped, equally spaced green leaves with numerous long, flat, lance-shaped leaflets. One leaf may exceed 1.5 meters in length, and the thick leaflets may be over 20 centimeters long. The undersides of the leaflets are hairy, especially on the indusia covering the spore-bearing sori.
