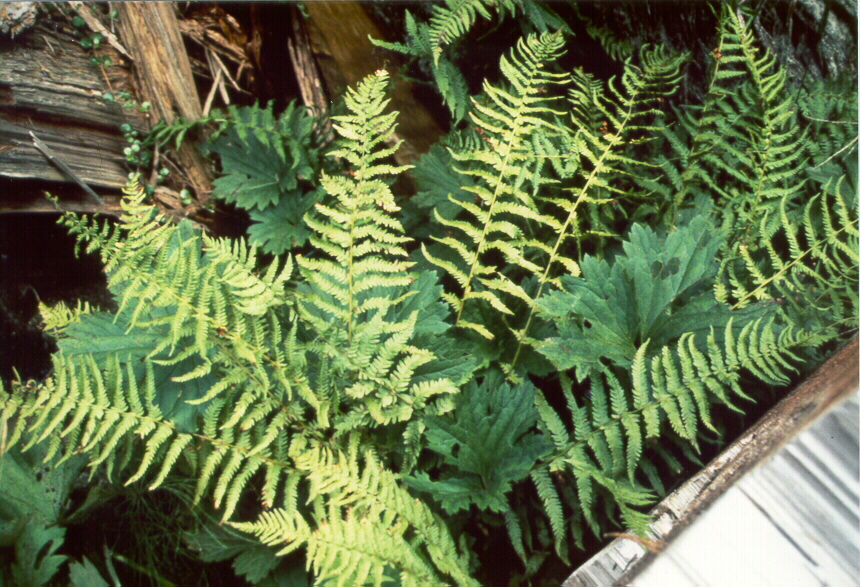

Conservation status
- Apparently Secure (NatureServe)

Scientific classification
- Kingdom: Plantae
- Clade: Tracheophytes
- Division: Polypodiophyta
- Class: Polypodiopsida
- Order: Polypodiales
- Suborder: Aspleniineae
- Family: Thelypteridaceae
- Genus: Parathelypteris
- Species: P. nevadensis

Binomial name
- Parathelypteris nevadensis (Baker) Holttum

Synonyms
- Aspidium nevadense (Baker) Eaton; Dryopteris nevadensis (Baker) Underw.; Dryopteris oregana C.Chr.; Filix oregana (C.Chr.) Farw.; Lastrea oregana (C.Chr.) Copel.; Nephrodium nevadense Baker; Parathelypteris noveboracensis subsp. nevadensis (Baker) Á.Löve & D.Löve; Thelypteris nevadensis (Baker) Clute ex Morton; Thelypteris oregana (C.Chr.) H.St.John

= Parathelypteris nevadensis =

Species of fern

Parathelypteris nevadensis, synonym Thelypteris nevadensis, is a species of fern known by the common names Sierra marsh fern, Sierra wood fern, and Nevada marsh fern. It is native to western North America from British Columbia to the mountains of northern California, where it grows in moist wooded areas, streamsides, meadows, and seeps. It is known from two locations in Idaho, as well. Despite its name it is not found in Nevada, rather, it was named for the Sierra Nevada, where it does occur in the northern mountains. It produces a dense cluster of long, feathery leaves which may be up to a meter long. It is rhizomatous and it sometimes forms colonies. The leaves die back in winter. Each leaf is made up of leaflets lined with smaller segments. The undersides are glandular and resinous and sometimes hairy.
