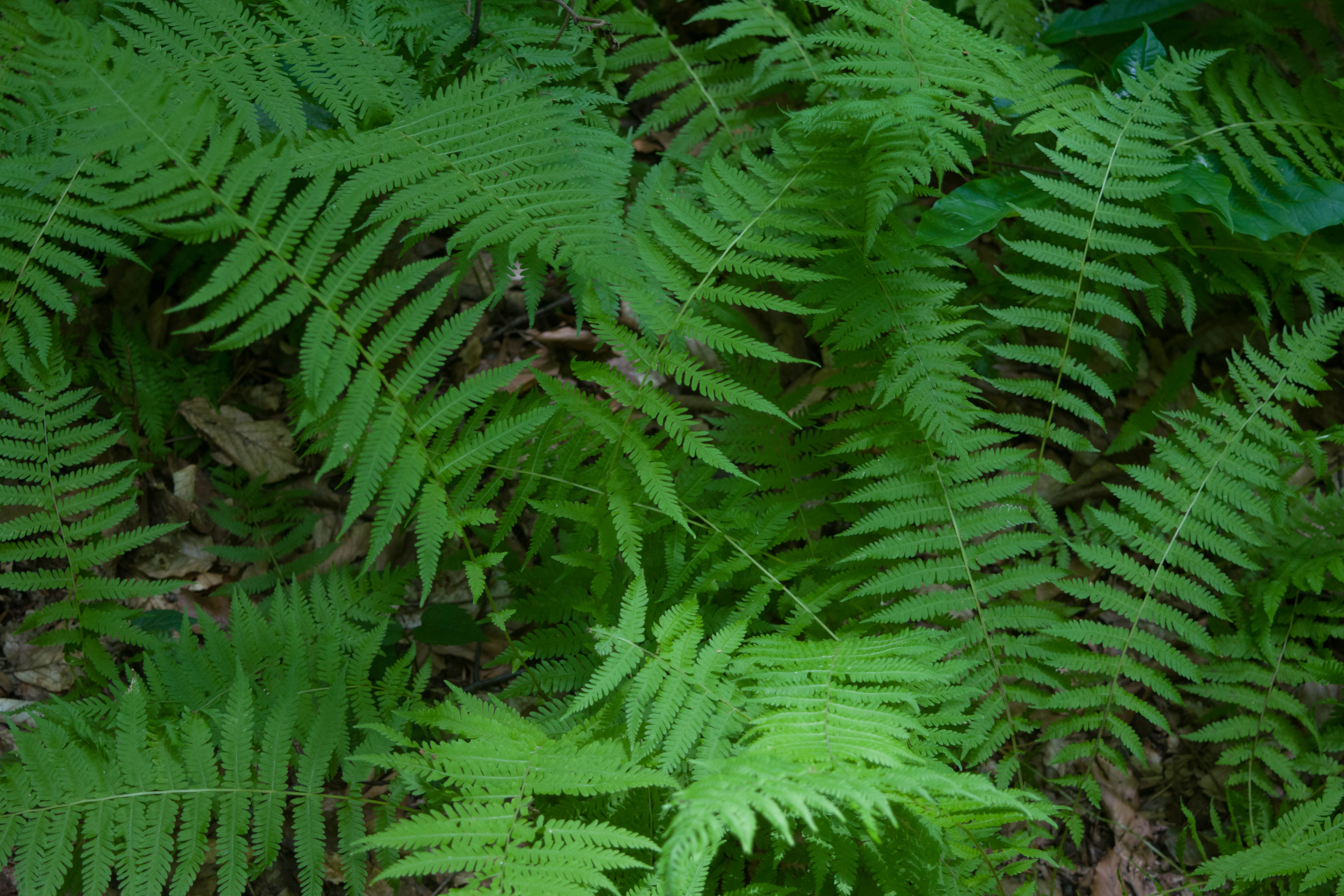

Conservation status
- Secure (NatureServe)

Scientific classification
- Kingdom: Plantae
- Clade: Tracheophytes
- Division: Polypodiophyta
- Class: Polypodiopsida
- Order: Polypodiales
- Suborder: Aspleniineae
- Family: Thelypteridaceae
- Genus: Amauropelta
- Species: A. noveboracensis

Binomial name
- Amauropelta noveboracensis (L.) S.E.Fawc. & A.R.Sm.
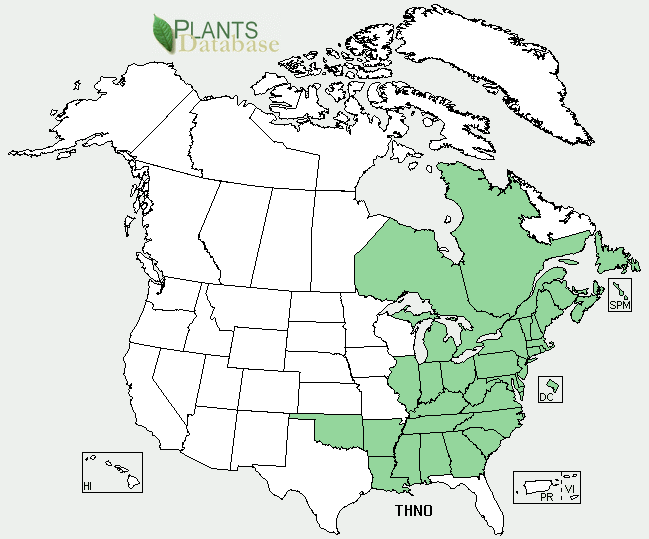
- Range of New York fern via USDA

Synonyms
- Aspidium noveboracense (L.) Schrad.; Aspidium thelypteris var. noveboracense (L.) Alph.Wood; Dryopteris noveboracensis (L.) Gray; Filix noveboracensis (L.) Farw.; Filix-mas noveboracensis (L.) Farw.; Lastrea noveboracensis (L.) C.Presl; Nephrodium novaeboracense (L.) Desv.; Nephrodium thelypteroides Michx.; Parathelypteris noveboracensis (L.) Ching; Polypodium alleganum Poir.; Polypodium noveboracense L.; Thelypteris noveboracensis (L.) Nieuwl.; Thelypteris thelypteroides (Michx.) Holub

= Amauropelta noveboracensis =

Species of fern

Amauropelta noveboracensis, the New York fern, is a perennial species of fern found throughout the eastern United States and Canada, from Louisiana to Newfoundland, but most concentrated within Appalachia and the Atlantic Northeast. New York ferns often forms spreading colonies within the forests they inhabit.

== Description ==
This fern grows in clumps of three or more fronds along a dark brown, slightly scaly rhizome. The frond is held on a stipe which is 20% of the length of the leaf and brown at the base but becoming green as it approaches the leaflets. The stipe is typically covered in brown scales at the base and finely hairy farther up. The leaf is overall 8–25 inches (20–64 cm) long, yellow-green, rather soft and thin in texture, and tapers at either end with the lowest 4-10 leaflets being generally smaller than those above. The leaf is divided into approximately 20 pinnae or leaflets, these leaflets are deeply cut into smaller, oblong and rounded subleaflets. It produces both fertile and sterile fronds—the fertile fronds are larger and more upright, and produce a few small, round sori near the margins, but not touching the margins, of the pinnae. These sori are covered by a tan, hairy, kidney-shaped indusium.

It is distinctive by its pinnae tapering to the base of the frond, and by its forming extensive clonal colonies on ridgetops and mountain benches. The only other native species in this area with similarly tapering pinnae is the ostrich fern, which generally grows in riparian habitats and is much taller (up to 1.5 m or 4.9 ft). The only other species that forms as extensive clonal colonies is the hay-scented fern. Unlike the hay-scented fern, New York fern grows along a dark brown, slightly scaly trailing rhizomes, for comparison, hay-scented fern grows along a smooth rhizome with only one frond arising at a node. Hay-scented fern also has leaflets which are much more finely cut or jagged on the edges whereas New York fern typically has smooth rounded edges to its leaflets.

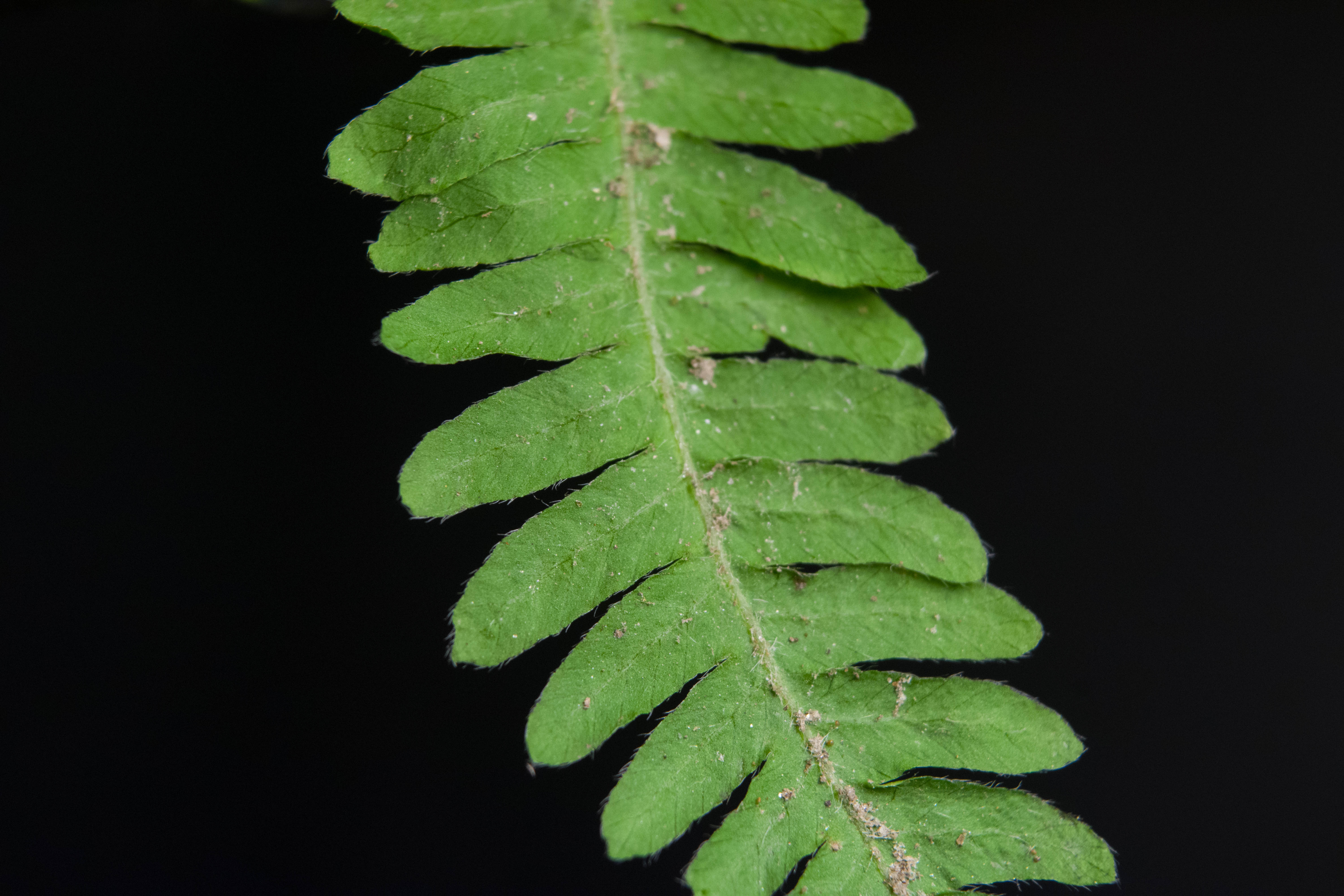
Showing leaflet structure

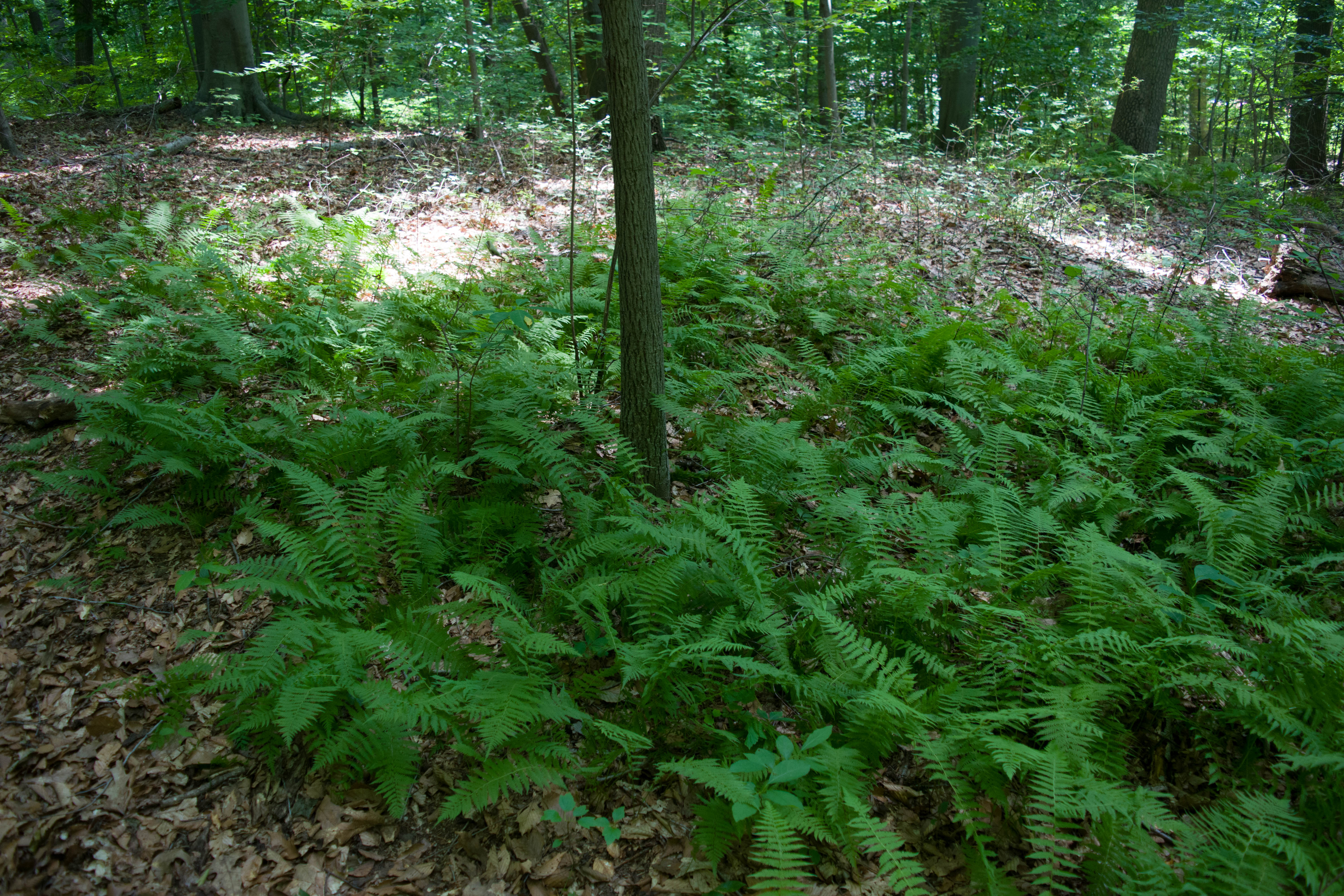
Showing the colonial habit

== Ecology ==
New York fern is common in sunny patches caused by canopy gaps in mixed woodlands, near vernal seeps, at the edge of swamps, in wooded ravines, and along streams. Once soil pH levels decline below 4.1, this fern can become a dominant understory species. In such situations, it may out-compete the seedlings of certain tree species, some of which are commercially important. The seedlings of Prunus serotina are especially vulnerable, as the fern releases an allelopathic phenol which can kill them.

This fern is a wetland indicator, and an endangered species in Illinois.
