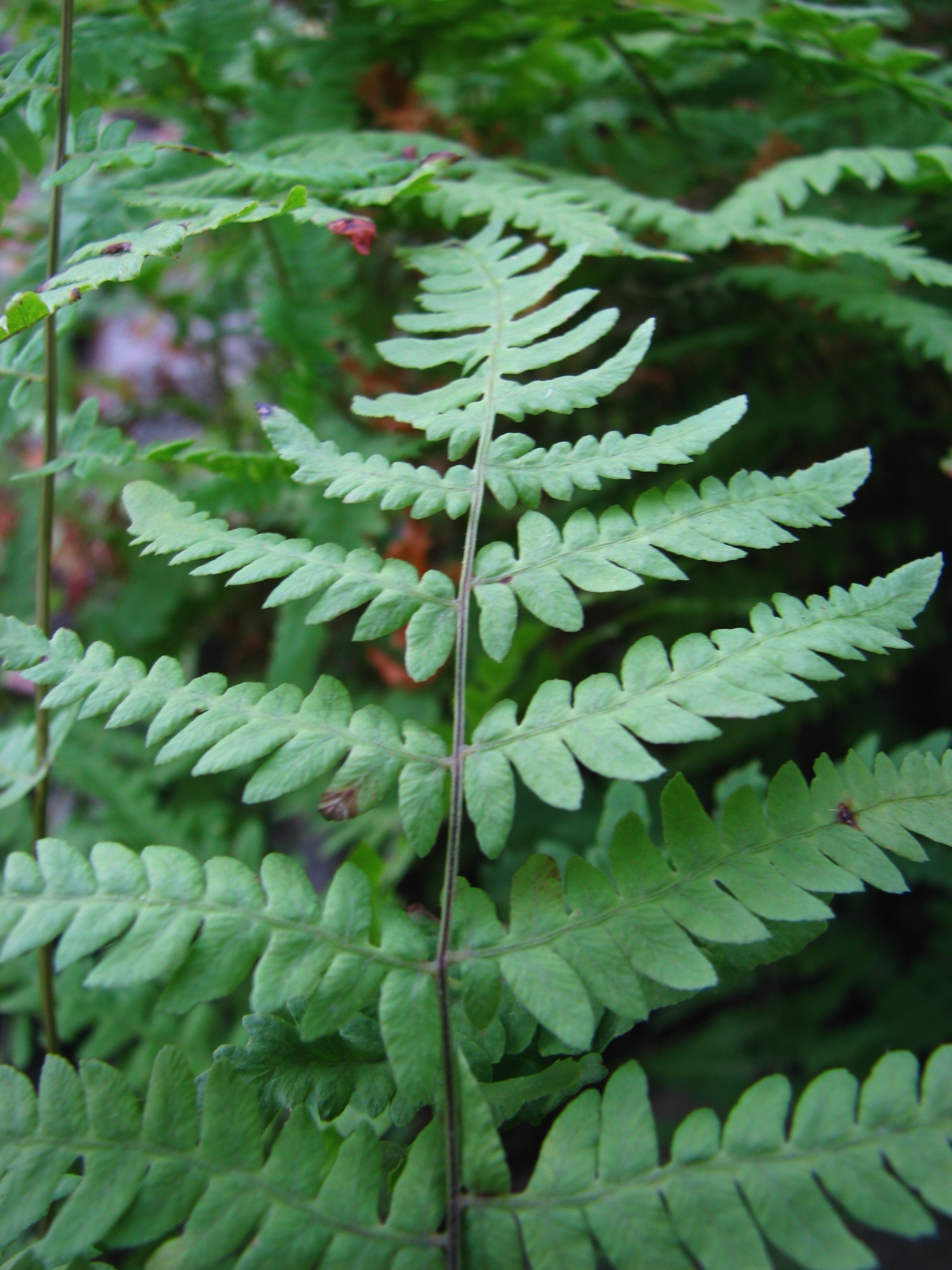

Conservation status
- Secure (NatureServe)

- Least Concern (IUCN 3.1)

Scientific classification
- Kingdom: Plantae
- Clade: Tracheophytes
- Division: Polypodiophyta
- Class: Polypodiopsida
- Order: Polypodiales
- Suborder: Aspleniineae
- Family: Thelypteridaceae
- Genus: Thelypteris
- Species: T. palustris

Binomial name
- Thelypteris palustris Schott

Synonyms
- List: Acrostichum thelypteris L.; Aspidium palustre Gray; Aspidium thelypteris (L.) Sw.; Aspidium thelypteris f. pufferae B.L.Rob.; Athyrium thelypteris (L.) Spreng.; Dryopteris thelypteris (L.) A.Gray; Dryopteris thelypteris f. haleana (Fernald) C.F.Reed; Dryopteris thelypteris var. haleana (Fernald) M.Broun ex Weath.; Dryopteris thelypteris var. koreana Nakai; Dryopteris thelypteris f. linearis (Farw.) M.Broun; Dryopteris thelypteris subsp. pubescens (G.Lawson) Hultén; Dryopteris thelypteris var. pubescens (G.Lawson) Nakai; Dryopteris thelypteris f. pufferae (A.A.Eaton) A.Prince ex Weath.; Dryopteris thelypteris f. suaveolens (Clute) A.Prince ex Weath.; Dryopteris tremula Christ; Filix thelypteris (L.) Farw.; Filix thelypteris f. frondosa Farw.; Filix thelypteris var. linearis Farw.; Filix-mas thelypteris (L.) Farw.; Filix-mas thelypteris f. frondosa Farw.; Filix-mas thelypteris var. linearis Farw.; Filix-mas thelypteris var. pubescens Farw.; Filix-mas thelypteris subvar. frondosa Farw.; Hemestheum thelypteris (L.) Newman; Lastrea palustris (Schott) J.Sm.; Lastrea thelypteris (L.) C.Presl; Lastrea thelypteris var. pubescens G.Lawson; Nephrodium thelypteris (L.) Strempel; Nephrodium thelypteris f. pufferae A.A.Eaton; Nephrodium thelypteris f. suaveolens Clute; Polypodium palustre Salisb.; Polypodium pterioides Lam.; Polypodium thelypteris (L.) Weis; Polystichum convolutum Dulac; Polystichum thelypteris (L.) Roth; Tectaria pterioides (Lam.) Lag., Garcia & Clem.; Thelypteris confluens var. pubescens (G.Lawson) J.S.Pringle; Thelypteris palustris f. frondosa (Farw.) Gruber; Thelypteris palustris var. haleana Fernald; Thelypteris palustris f. linearis (Farw.) C.F.Reed; Thelypteris palustris f. pubescens (G.Lawson) Clute; Thelypteris palustris var. pubescens Fernald; Thelypteris palustris f. pufferae (A.A.Eaton) C.F.Reed; Thelypteris palustris f. pufferae L.B.Sm.; Thelypteris palustris f. serratipinnula Gruber; Thelypteris palustris f. suaveolens (Clute) C.F.Reed; Thelypteris palustris f. suaveolens Fernald; Thelypteris thelypterioides subsp. glabra Holub; Thelypteris thelypteris (L.) Nieuwl.

= Thelypteris palustris =

Species of fern

Thelypteris palustris, the marsh fern, or eastern marsh fern, is a species of fern native to eastern North America and across Eurasia. It prefers to grow in swamps, bogs, wet fields or thickets, fresh tidal and nontidal marshes, or wooded streambanks. The species epithet palustris is Latin for "of the marsh" and indicates its common habitat. It is the only known host plant for Fagitana littera, the marsh fern moth.

== Description ==
Fronds of T. palustris are erect to ascending with an elliptic to lanceolate form. They are 1-2.5 ft long and 4-7 inches across and have 10-40 pairs of leaflets. Its leaves are pinnately lobed, with the middle pinna being the widest. The leaves are more than 6 inches long, and the 3-6 inches wide. Sori are present on the undersides of the smaller fertile leaves.

The stem is tan to purplish and hairless.

== Uses ==
T. palustris has been studied for potential uses in phytoremediation. T. palustris has been shown to significantly reduce the amount of Zn^{2+} and Cu^{2+}, which are the main outputs of heavy metal from intensive livestock production, ex situ. There have been mixed results for whether T. palustris would be a good candidate for remediation of arsenic soil contamination.

== Subtaxa ==
The following subspecies are accepted:

- Thelypteris palustris subsp. palustris
- Thelypteris palustris subsp. pubescens (G.Lawson) Fraser-Jenk.
