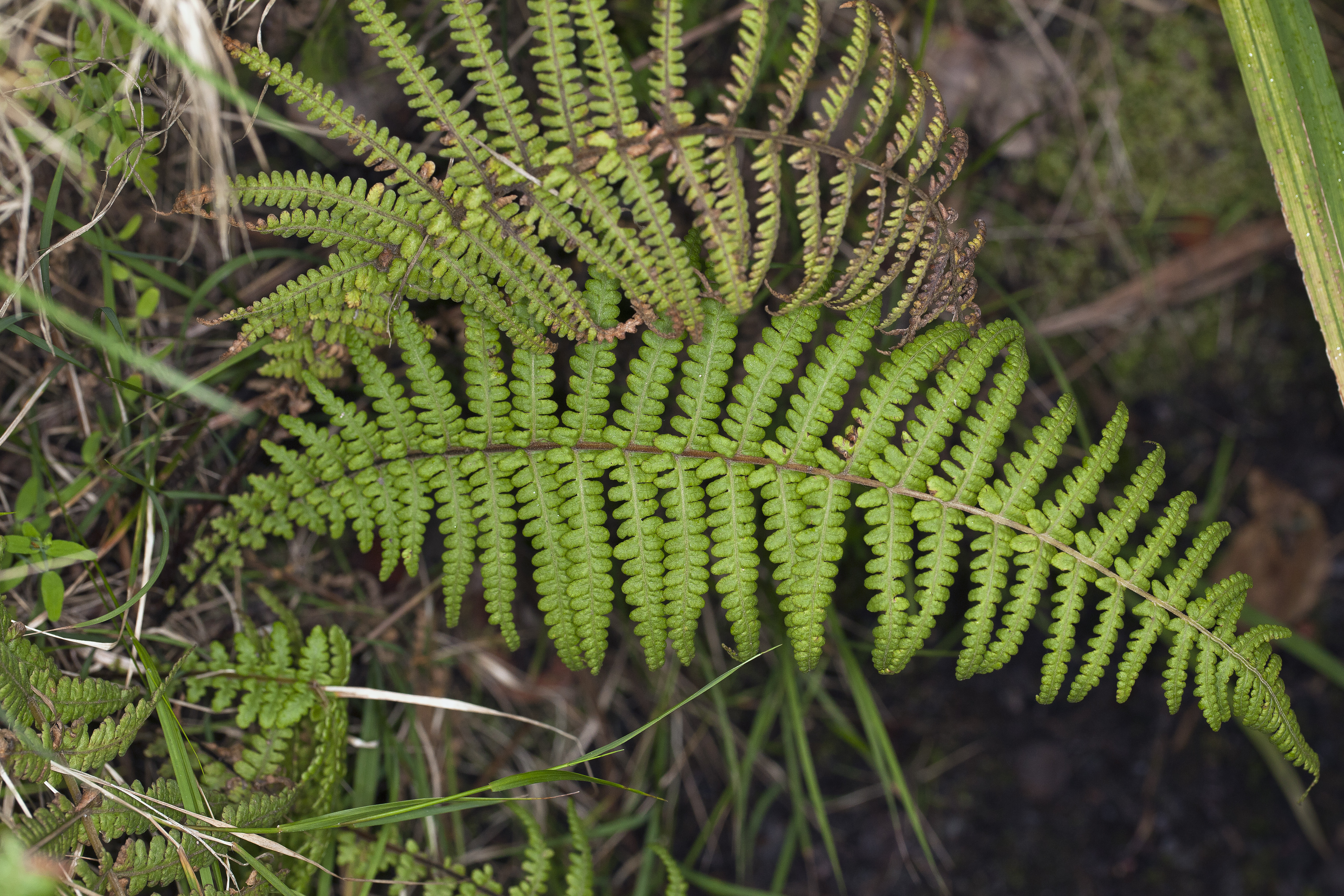
- Amauropelta globulifera in Volcanoes National Park, Hawaii Island

Scientific classification
- Kingdom: Plantae
- Clade: Tracheophytes
- Division: Polypodiophyta
- Class: Polypodiopsida
- Order: Polypodiales
- Suborder: Aspleniineae
- Family: Thelypteridaceae
- Subfamily: Thelypteridoideae
- Genus: Amauropelta; Kunze

Species
- See text.

Synonyms
- Thelypteris subg. Amauropelta (Kunze) A.R.Sm.; Oochlamys Fée

= Amauropelta =

Genus of ferns

Amauropelta is a monophyletic genus of fern, the largest in the Thelypteridaceae family, with 233 species. The center of diversity of the genus is in the Neotropics, but the earliest-diverging lineages are from the Old World.

The genus Amauropelta is very similar morphologically to the other two genera of the amaropeltoid clade, Coryphopteris and Metathelypteris, differing from the first in the lack of sessile, resinous, reddish glands on the lamina between veins (except in the A. resinifera group) and from the second by the veins running to the margins.

Within the Thelypteridaceae in the Neotropics it is easily recognised by the pairs of gradually reduced proximal pinnae, which vary from few to many, depending on the species, and the veins usually prominent abaxially and adaxially, with the lowermost pair from adjacent segments running to the margin just above the sinus between adjacent lobes, rarely (in A. linkiana) running to the sinus, and never united to form excurrent veins that run to sinuses; the veins end at the pinna margins.

Outside of the amauropeltoid clade and in the Old World region, Amauropelta spp. are similar to the more distantly related Pseudocyclosorus, which also has free veins and many pairs of gradually reduced proximal pinnae.

Amauropelta is subdivided into four subgenera: Amauropelta, Parathelypteris, Nibaa and Venus.

== Subgenera ==
Subgenus Amauropelta S.E. Fawc. & A.R. Sm

Amauropelta subgenus Amauropelta is the largest with 223 species (listed below) and can be distinguished from others by monoploid chromosome number x = 29 and rhizomes typically erect.

- A. achalensis (Hieron.) Salino & T.E. Almeida
- A. aculeata (A.R. Sm.) Salino & T.E.Almeida
- A. aliena (C. Chr.) Salino & T.E. Almeida
- A. altitudinis (Ponce) Salino & T.E. Almeida
- A. amambayensis (Christ) Salino & A.R. Sm.
- A. amphioxypteris (Sodiro) Salino & T.E. Almeida
- A. andicola (A.R. Sm.) Salino & T.E. Almeida
- A. appressa (A.R. Sm.) Salino & T.E. Almeida
- A. araucariensis (Ponce) Salino & T.E. Almeida
- A. arborea (Brause) A.R. Sm.
- A. arenosa (A.R. Sm.) A.R. Sm.
- A. argentina (Hieron.) Salino & T.E. Almeida
- A. arrecta (A.R. Sm.) Salino & T.E. Almeida
- A. aspidioides (Willd.) Pic.Serm.
- A. atrorubens (Mett. ex Kuhn) Salino & T.E. Almeida
- A. atrovirens (C. Chr.) Salino & T.E. Almeida
- A. aymarae (A.R. Sm. & M. Kessler) Salino & T.E. Almeida
- A. balbisii (Spreng.) A.R. Sm.
- A. barvae (A.R. Sm.) Salino & T.E. Almeida
- A. basisceletica (C. Sánchez, Caluff & O. Alvarez) Salino & T.E. Almeida
- A. bergiana (Schltdl.) Holttum A. binervata (A.R. Sm.) A.R. Sm.
- A. boliviana A.R. Sm.
- A. bonapartii (Rosenst.) Salino & T.E. Almeida
- A. brachypoda (Baker) A.R. Sm.
- A. brachypus (Sodiro) A.R. Sm.
- A. brausei (Hieron.) A.R. Sm.
- A. burkartii (Abbiatti) Salino & T.E. Almeida
- A. campii (A.R. Sm.) Salino & T.E. Almeida
- A. canadasii (Sodiro) Salino & T.E. Almeida
- A. caucaensis (Hieron.) A.R. Sm.
- A. chaparensis (A.R. Sm. & M. Kessler) Salino & T.E. Almeida
- A. cheilanthoides (Kunze) Á. Löve & D. Löve
- A. chiriquiana (A.R. Sm.) Salino & T.E. Almeida
- A. christensenii (C. Chr. in Christ) Salino & T.E. Almeida
- A. cinerea (Sodiro) A.R. Sm.
- A. cochaensis (C. Chr.) Salino & T.E. Almeida
- A. cocos (A.R. Sm. & Lellinger) Salino & T.E. Almeida
- A. comptula (A.R. Sm.) Salino & T.E. Almeida
- A. concinna (Willd.) Pic.Serm.
- A. conformis (Sodiro) Salino & T.E. Almeida
- A. consanguinea (Fée) Salino & T.E. Almeida
- A. cooleyi (Proctor) Salino & T.E. Almeida
- A. corazonensis (Baker) Salino & T.E. Almeida
- A. cornuta (Maxon) Salino & T.E. Almeida
- A. correllii (A.R. Sm.) Salino & T.E. Almeida
- A. crassiuscula (C. Chr. & Maxon) Salino & T.E. Almeida
- A. ctenitoides (A.R. Sm.) Salino & T.E. Almeida
- A. decrescens (Proctor) Salino & T.E. Almeida
- A. decurtata (Link) Salino & T.E. Almeida A. deflectens (C. Chr.) Salino & T.E. Almeida
- A. deflexa (C. Presl) Á. Löve & D. Löve
- A. demissa (A.R. Sm.) Salino & T.E. Almeida
- A. delasotae (A.R. Sm. & Lellinger) Salino & T.E. Almeida
- A. demerarana (Baker) Boudrie & Cremers
- A. denudata (C. Sánchez & Caluff) Salino & T.E. Almeida
- A. diplazioides (Desv.) Pic.Serm. A. dodsonii (A.R. Sm.) Salino & T.E. Almeida
- A. dudleyi (A.R. Sm.) Salino & T.E. Almeida
- A. elegantula (Sodiro) Salino & T.E. Almeida
- A. enigmatica (A.R. Sm.) Salino & T.E. Almeida
- A. eriosorus (Fée) Salino & T.E. Almeida
- A. euchlora (Sodiro) A.R. Sm.
- A. euthythrix (A.R. Sm.) Salino & T.E. Almeida
- A. exuta (A.R. Sm.) Salino & T.E. Almeida
- A. fasciola (A.R. Sm. & M. Kessler) Salino & T.E. Almeida
- A. fayorum (A.R. Sm.& M. Kessler) Salino & T.E. Almeida
- A. firma (Baker ex Jenman) Salino & T.E. Almeida
- A. fluminalis (A.R. Sm.) Salino & T.E. Almeida
- A. frigida (Christ) A.R. Sm. A. funckii (Mett.) A.R. Sm.
- A. furfuracea (A.R. Sm.) Salino & T.E. Almeida
- A. furva (Maxon) Salino & T.E. Almeida
- A. germaniana (Fée) Salino & T.E. Almeida
- A. glabrescens A.R. Sm.
- A. glandulosolanosa (C. Chr.) Salino & T.E. Almeida
- A. globulifera (Brack.) Holttum
- A. glutinosa (C. Chr.) Salino & T.E. Almeida
- A. gomeziana (A.R. Sm. & Lellinger) Salino & T.E. Almeida
- A. gracilenta (Jenman) Salino & T.E. Almeida
- A. gracilis (Heward) A.R. Sm.
- A. grantii (Copel.) Holttum
- A. grayumii (A.R. Sm.) Salino & T.E. Almeida
- A. hakgalensis Holttum
- A. harrisii (Proctor) Salino & T.E. Almeida
- A. hastiloba (C. Chr.) Salino & T.E. Almeida
- A. heineri (C. Chr.) Salino & T.E. Almeida
- A. heteroclita (Desv.) Pic.Serm.
- A. heteroptera (Desv.) Holttum
- A. hutchisonii (A.R. Sm.) Salino & T.E. Almeida
- A. hydrophila (Fée) Salino & T.E. Almeida
- A. illicita (Christ) Salino & T.E. Almeida
- A. inabonensis (Proctor) Salino & T.E. Almeida
- A. inaequans (C. Chr.) Salino & T.E. Almeida
- A. inaequilateralis (A.R. Sm. & M. Kessler) Salino & T.E. Almeida
- A. insignis (Mett.) Salino & T.E. Almeida
- A. intromissa (C. Chr.) Salino & T.E. Almeida
- A. ireneae (Brade) Salino & T.E. Almeida
- A. jimenezii (Maxon & C. Chr.) Salino & T.E. Almeida
- A. juergensii (Rosenst.) Salino & T.E. Almeida
- A. jujuyensis (de la Sota) Salino & T.E. Almeida
- A. knysnaensis (N.C. Anthony & Schelpe) Parris
- A. laevigata (Mett. ex Kuhn) Salino & T.E. Almeida
- A. lanceolata A.R. Sm.
- A. leoniae (A.R. Sm.) Salino & T.E. Almeida
- A. lepidula (Hieron.) A.R. Sm.
- A. limbata (Sw.) Pic.Serm.
- A. linkiana (C. Presl) Pic.Serm.
- A. longicaulis (Baker) Salino & T.E. Almeida
- A. longipilosa (Sodiro) Salino & T.E. Almeida
- A. longisora (A.R. Sm.) Salino & T.E. Almeida
- A. loreae (A.R. Sm.) Salino & T.E. Almeida
- A. loretensis (A.R. Sm.) Salino & T.E. Almeida
- A. lumbricoides (A.R. Sm. & M. Kessler) Salino & T.E. Almeida
- A. macra (A.R. Sm.) Salino & T.E. Almeida
- A. madidiensis (A.R. Sm. & M. Kessler) Salino & T.E. Almeida
- A. malangae (C. Chr.) Salino & T.E. Almeida
- A. margaretae (E. Br.) Holttum
- A. melanochlaena (C. Chr.) Salino & T.E. Almeida
- A. membranifera (C. Chr.) Holttum
- A. mertensioides (C. Chr.) Salino & T.E. Almeida
- A. metteniana (Ching) Salino & T.E. Almeida
- A. micula (A.R. Sm.) Salino & T.E. Almeida
- A. minima (A.R. Sm. & M. Kessler) Salino & T.E. Almeida
- A. minutula (C.V. Morton) Salino & T.E. Almeida
- A. mombachensis (L.D. Gómez) Salino & T.E. Almeida
- A. mortonii (A.R. Sm.) Salino & T.E. Almeida
- A. mosenii (C. Chr.) Salino & T.E. Almeida
- A. muscicola (Proctor) Salino & T.E. Almeida
- A. namaphila (Proctor) Salino & T.E. Almeida
- A. neglecta (Brade & Rosenst.) Salino & T.E. Almeida
- A. negligens (Jenman) Salino & T.E. Almeida
- A. nephelium (A.R. Sm. & M. Kessler) Salino & T.E. Almeida
- A. nitens (Desv.) Salino & T.E. Almeida
- A. nockiana (Jenman) Salino & T.E. Almeida
- A. novaeana (Brade) Salino & T.E. Almeida
- A. nubicola (de la Sota) Salino & T.E. Almeida
- A. nubigena (A.R. Sm.) Salino & T.E. Almeida
- A. oaxacana (A.R. Sm.) Salino & T.E. Almeida
- A. odontosora (Bonap.) Holttum
- A. oligocarpa (Humb. & Bonpl. ex Willd.) Pic.Serm.
- A. ophiorhizoma (A.R. Sm. & Lellinger) Salino & T.E. Almeida
- A. opposita (Vahl) Pic.Serm.
- A. oppositiformis (C. Chr.) Holttum
- A. pachyrhachis (Kunze ex Mett.) Salino & T.E. Almeida
- A. paleacea (A.R. Sm.) Salino & T.E. Almeida
- A. patula (Fée) Salino & T.E. Almeida
- A. pavoniana (Klotzsch) Salino & T.E. Almeida
- A. pelludia (A.R. Sm. & M. Kessler) Salino & T.E. Almeida
- A. peradenia (A.R. Sm.) A.R. Sm.
- A. peruviana (Rosenst.) Salino & T.E. Almeida
- A. phacelothrix (C. Chr. & Rosenst.) Salino & T.E. Almeida
- A. physematioides (Kuhn & Christ ex Krug) Salino & T.E. Almeida
- A. piedrensis (C. Chr.) Salino & T.E. Almeida
- A. pilosissima (C.V. Morton) A.R. Sm.
- A. pilosohispida (Hook.) A.R. Sm.
- A. pilosula (Klotzsch & H. Karst. ex Mett.) Á. Löve & D. Löve
- A. pleiophylla (Sehnem) Salino & T.E. Almeida
- A. podotricha (Sehnem) Salino & T.E. Almeida
- A. proboscidea (A.R. Sm.) Salino & T.E. Almeida
- A. proctorii (A.R. Sm. & Lellinger) A.R. Sm.
- A. prolatipedis (Lellinger) A.R. Sm.
- A. ptarmica (Kunze ex Mett.) Pic.Serm.
- A. ptarmiciformis (C. Chr. & Rosenst. ex Rosenst.) Salino & T.E. Almeida
- A. pteroidea (Klotzsch) A.R. Sm.
- A. pusilla (Mett.) A.R. Sm.
- A. raddii (Rosenst.) Salino & T.E. Almeida
- A. randallii (Maxon & C.V. Morton ex C.V. Morton) Salino & T.E. Almeida
- A. recumbens (Rosenst.) Salino & T.E. Almeida
- A. reducta (C. Chr.) Salino & T.E. Almeida
- A. regnelliana (C. Chr.) Salino & T.E. Almeida
- A. resinifera (Desv.) Pic.Serm.
- A. retrorsa (Sodiro) Salino & T.E. Almeida
- A. retusa (Sw.) Salino & T.E. Almeida
- A. rheophyta (Proctor) Salino & T.E. Almeida
- A. rigescens (Sodiro) Salino & T.E. Almeida
- A. rivularioides (Fée) Salino & T.E. Almeida
- A. roraimensis (Baker) A.R. Sm.
- A. rosenstockii (C. Chr.) Salino & T.E. Almeida
- A. rosulata (A.R. Sm. & M. Kessler) Salino & T.E. Almeida
- A. rudiformis (C. Chr.) Salino & T.E. Almeida
- A. rudis (Kunze) Pic.Serm.
- A. rufa (Poir.)Salino & T.E. Almeida
- A. ruiziana (Klotzsch) Salino & T.E. Almeida
- A. rupestris (Klotzsch) A.R. Sm.
- A. rupicola (C. Chr.) Salino & T.E. Almeida
- A. rustica (Fée) Salino & T.E. Almeida
- A. sabaensis A. salazica (Holttum) Holttum
- A. sancta (L.) Pic.Serm.
- A. sanctae-catharinae (Rosenst.) Salino & T.E. Almeida
- A. saxicola (Sw.) Salino & T.E. Almeida
- A. scalaris (Christ) Á. Löve & D. Löve
- A. scalpturoides (Fée) Salino & T.E. Almeida
- A. sellensis (C. Chr.) Salino & T.E. Almeida
- A. semilunata (Sodiro) Salino & T.E. Almeida
- A. shaferi (Maxon & C. Chr.) Salino & T.E. Almeida
- A. soridepressa (Salino & V.A.O. Dittrich) Salino & T.E. Almeida
- A. steyermarkii (A.R. Sm.) Salino & T.E. Almeida
- A. stierii (Rosenst.) Salino & T.E. Almeida
- A. straminea (Sodiro) Salino & T.E. Almeida
- A. strigillosa (A.R. Sm. & Lellinger) Salino & T.E. Almeida
- A. strigosa (Willd.) Holttum
- A. struthiopteroides (C. Chr.) Salino & T.E. Almeida
- A. subacrostichoides A.R. Sm.
- A. subscandens (A.R. Sm.) Salino & T.E. Almeida
- A. subtilis (A.R. Sm.) Salino & T.E. Almeida
- A. supina (Sodiro) Salino & T.E. Almeida
- A. supranitens (Christ) Á. Löve & D. Löve
- A. tablana (Christ) Salino & T.E. Almeida
- A. tamandarei (Rosenst.) Salino & T.E. Almeida
- A. tapantensis (A.R. Sm. & Lellinger) Salino & T.E. Almeida
- A. tenerrima (Fée) Salino & T.E. Almeida
- A. thomsonii (Jenm.) Pic.Serm.
- A. tomentosa (Thouars) Holttum
- A. trelawniensis (Proctor) Salino & T.E. Almeida
- A. uncinata (A.R. Sm.) Salino & T.E. Almeida
- A. vattuonei (Hicken) Salino & T.E. Almeida
- A. venturae (A.R. Sm.) Salino & T.E. Almeida
- A. vernicosa (A.R. Sm. & Lellinger) Salino & T.E. Almeida
- A. villana (L.D. Gómez) Salino & T.E. Almeida
- A. yungensis (A.R. Sm. & M. Kessler) Salino & T.E. Almeida
- A. zurquiana (A.R. Sm. & Lellinger) Salino & T.E. Almeida

Subgenus Nibaa S.E. Fawc. & A.R. Sm

Amauropelta subgenus Nibaa is composed of two species (listed below) and can be distinguished from others by glands yellow to colorless (vs. amber resinous orange-yellow to reddish), x = 31.

- A. nevadensis (Baker) S.E. Fawc. & A.R. Sm.
- A. noveboracensis (L.) S.E. Fawc. & A.R. Sm.

Subgenus Parathelypteris S.E. Fawc. & A.R. Sm

Amauropelta subgenus Parathelypteris is composed of six species (listed below) and can be distinguished from others by proximal pinnae typically abruptly or little reduced and by the biogeographical distribution (East Asia), x = 27 or 31.

- A. angustifrons (Miq.) Y.H. Chang
- A. cystopteroides (D.C. Eaton) S.E. Fawc. & A.R. Sm.
- A. glanduligera (Kunze) Y.H. Chang
- A. grammitoides (Christ) S.E. Fawc. & A.R. Sm.
- A. miyagii (H. Ito) S.E. Fawc. & A.R. Sm.
- A. serrulata (Ching) S.E. Fawc. & A.R. Sm.

Subgenus Venus S.E. Fawc. & A.R. Sm

Amauropelta subgenus Venus is composed of two species (listed below), x = 31.

- A. beddomei (Baker) Y.H. Chang
- A. rechingeri (Holttum) S.E. Fawc. & A.R. Sm
