= List of botanists by author abbreviation (M) =

This is an incomplete list of botanists by their author abbreviation, which is designed for citation with the botanical names or works that they have published. This list follows that established by Brummitt & Powell (1992). Use of that list is recommended by Rec. 46A Note 1 of the International Code of Nomenclature for algae, fungi, and plants. The list is kept up to date online at The International Plant Names Index and Index Fungorum.

In some cases an "author abbreviation" consists of a full surname, while in other cases the surname is abbreviated and/or accompanied by one or more initials. There is no space between the initials and the surname (or its abbreviation).

==== Order of entries ====
The list here is maintained strictly in order of the alphabetic characters in the abbreviation; thus "A.B.Jacks." appears under "A" not "J", and is located as if the characters were "ABJACKS". Capitalization is ignored as are all non-alphabetic characters such as "." and space. Diacritical marks are also ignored, so that, e.g., "ü" is treated as if it were "u".

==== Navigation ====
Because of its length, the list is split across separate pages. All alphabetic sections can be accessed from the short table of contents; the vertical bars show the page divisions. Searching will only find an entry within a page.

== A–L ==
| Contents: | A | B | C | D | E F | G | H | I J | K L | M | N O | P | Q R | S | T U V | W X Y Z |

To find entries for A–L, use the table of contents above.

== M ==
| Contents: Top | A | B | C | D | E F | G | H | I J | K L | M | N O | P | Q R | S | T U V | W X Y Z |

- Ma – Yu Chuan Ma (born 1916)
- Maack – Richard Karlovich Maack (1825–1886)
- Maas – Paul Maas (born 1939)
- Maas Geest. – Rudolph Arnold Maas Geesteranus (1911–2003)
- M.A.Baker – Marc A. Baker (born 1952)
- Mabb. – David Mabberley (born 1948)
- Mabry – Tom J. Mabry (1932–2015)
- Macarthur – William Macarthur (1800-1882)
- MacDan. – Laurence Howland MacDaniels (1888–1986)
- MacDougal – Daniel Trembly MacDougal (1865–1958)
- Macfarl. – John Muirhead Macfarlane (1855–1943)
- Machado – Othon Xavier de Brito Machado (1896–1951)
- Mack. – Kenneth Kent Mackenzie (1877–1934)
- Macklin – Ellen Dulcie Macklin (1901–1979)
- Macklot – Heinrich Christian Macklot (1799–1832)
- MacLeay – William Sharp Macleay (fl. 1842)
- M.A.Clem. – Mark Alwin Clements (born 1949)
- MacMill. – Conway MacMillan (1867–1929)
- Maconochie – John Richard Maconochie (1941–1984)
- Macoun – John Macoun (1831–1920)
- MacOwan – Peter MacOwan (1830–1909)
- M.A.Curtis – Moses Ashley Curtis (1808–1872)
- Madani – Leopold Madani (fl. 1993)
- Madden – Edward Madden (1805–1856)
- Madenis – Claude Benoit Madenis (1798–1863)
- Madhus. – Pandara Valappil Madhusoodanan (born 1950)
- M.A.Diniz – Maria Adélia Diniz (born 1941)
- Madison – Michael T. Madison (born 1948)
- M.A.Dix – Margaret A. Dix (1939–2025)
- Mädler – Karl Mädler (1902–2003)
- Madore – Lois Kay Madore (born 1948)
- Madrigal – Xavier Madrigal-Sánchez (born 1935)
- Madriñán – Santiago Madriñán (born 1964)
- Madsen – Jens E. Madsen (fl. 1989)
- M.A.Fenton – Mildred Adams Fenton (1899–1995)
- M.A.Fisch. – Manfred A. Fischer (born 1942)
- Maek. – Tokujirô(Tokijiro) Maekawa (born 1886)
- Mägd. – Karl Mägdefrau (1907–1999)
- Magill – Robert Earle Magill (born 1947)
- Magnin – Antoine Magnin (1848–1926)
- Magnol – Pierre Magnol (1638–1715)
- Magnus – Paul Wilhelm Magnus (1844–1914)
- Magoswana – S.L. Magoswana (fl. 2014)
- Maguire – Bassett Maguire (1904–1991)
- M.Ahmed. – Mohammed Ahmedullah (fl. 2018)
- Mai – Dieter Hans Mai (1934–2013)
- Maiden – Joseph Maiden (1859–1925)
- Maille – Alphonse Maille (1813–1865)
- Maingay – Alexander Carroll Maingay (1836–1869)
- Maire – René Maire (1878–1949)
- Maitul. – Yulia Konstantinovna Maitulina (born 1954)
- Makar. – Maria Florianivna Makarevich (1906–1989)
- Makino – Tomitaro Makino (1862–1957)
- Makinson – Robert Owen Makinson (born 1956)
- Makowsky – Alexander Makowsky (1833–1908)
- Malaisse – François Malaisse (born 1934)
- M.A.Lane – Meredith A. Lane (born 1951)
- M.A.Lawson – Marmaduke Alexander Lawson (1840–1896)
- Malbr. – Alexandre François Malbranche (1818–1888)
- Mald. – Carla Maldonado (fl. 2014)
- M.Allemão – Manoel Allemão (died 1863)
- Malm – Jacob von Malm (born 1901)
- Malme – Gustaf Oskar Andersson Malme (1864–1937)
- Malmgren – Anders Johan Malmgren (1834–1897)
- Maly – Joseph Karl Maly (1797–1866)
- M.A.M.Renner – Matthew Anton Martyn Renner (born 1978)
- Manden. – Ida P. Mandenova (1907–1995)
- Mandon – Gilbert (Gustav) Mandon (1799–1866)
- Mani – Bince Mani (fl. 2015)
- Manik. – U. Manikandan (fl. 2001)
- Manilal – Kattungal Subramaniam Manilal (1938–2025)
- M.A.N.Müll. – Michiel Adriaan Niklaas Müller (1948–1997)
- Mansf. – Rudolf Mansfeld (1901–1960)
- Manton – Irene Manton (1904–1988)
- Manzan. – José Manuel Manzanares (born 1957)
- Mappus – Marcus Mappus (1666–1736)
- Marais – Wessel Marais (1929–2013)
- Maranta – Bartolomeo Maranta (also as Bartholomaeus Marantha) (1500–1571)
- Maratti – Giovanni Francesco Maratti (1723–1777)
- Marc.-Berti – Luis Marcano-Berti (fl. 1967)
- Marcgr. – Georg Marcgrave (Marcgraf, Markgraf) (1610–1644)
- Marchal – Élie Marchal (1839–1923)
- Marchand – Nestor Léon Marchand (1833–1911)
- Marchesi – Eduardo Marchesi (born 1943)
- Marchoux – Émile Marchoux (1862–1943)
- Marcks – Brian Marcks (fl. 1974)
- Marg. – Hanna Bogna Margońska (born 1968)
- Margulis – Lynn Margulis (1938–2011)
- Marion – Antoine Fortuné Marion (1846–1900)
- Mariz – Joaquim de Mariz (1847–1916)
- Markgr. – Friedrich Markgraf (1897–1987)
- Markgr.-Dann. – Ingeborg Markgraf-Dannenberg (1911–1996)
- Markham – Clements Robert Markham (1830–1916)
- Markl. – George Gunnar Marklund (1892–1964)
- Marline – Lovanomenjanahary Marline (born 1986)
- Marloth – Hermann Wilhelm Rudolf Marloth (1855–1931)
- Marn.-Lap. – Julien Marnier-Lapostolle (1902–1976)
- Marnock – Robert Marnock (1800–1889)
- Marquand – Ernest David Marquand (1848–1918)
- Marquis – Alexandre Louis Marquis (1777–1828)
- Marrero Rodr. – Águedo Marrero Rodriguez (fl. 1988)
- Marriott – Neil R. Marriott (fl. 1993)
- Marroq. – Jorge S. Marroquín (born 1935)
- Marsh – Charles Dwight Marsh (1855–1932)
- Marshall – Humphry Marshall (1722–1801)
- Mart. – Carl Friedrich Philipp von Martius (1794–1868)
- Mart.-Azorín – Mario Martínez-Azorín (born 1979)
- Mart.Crov. – Raúl Martínez Crovetto (1921–1988)
- Martelli – Ugolino Martelli (1860–1934)
- Mårtensson – Olle Mårtensson (1915–1995)
- Mart.Flores – Fernando Martínez Flores (born 1979)
- Martín Bol. – Manuel Martín Bolaños (1897–c. 1970)
- Martín-Bravo – Santiago Martín-Bravo (born 1980)
- Martinelli – Gustavo Martinelli (born 1954)
- Martinet – Jean Baptiste Henri Martinet (1840–c. 1910)
- Martínez – Maximino Martínez (1888–1964)
- Martini – Alessandro Martini (1934–2011)
- Martinoli – Giuseppe Martinoli (1911–1970)
- Martinov – Ivan Ivanovič Martinov (1771–1833)
- Martinovský – Jan Otakar Martinovský (1903–1980)
- Martins – Charles Frédéric Martins (1806–1889)
- Mart.-Laborde – Juan Bautista Martínez-Laborde (born 1955)
- Mart.Mart. – M. Martínez Martínez (1907–1936)
- Martos – Florent Martos (fl. 2015)
- Mart.Parras – José María Martinez Parras (born 1953)
- Martrin-Donos – Julien Victor de Martrin-Donos (1800–1870)
- Mart.Schmid – Martin Schmid (1969–2002)
- Martyn – Thomas M. Martyn (1736–1825)
- Masam. – Genkei Masamune (1899–1993)
- Masclef – Amédée Masclef (1858–1916)
- Maslin – Bruce R. Maslin (born 1946)
- M.A.Spencer – Michael A. Spencer (fl. 1992)
- Massart – Jean Massart (1865–1925)
- Massee – George Edward Massee (1845–1917)
- Masson – Francis Masson (1741–1805)
- Mast. – Maxwell Tylden Masters (1833–1907)
- Mateo – Gonzalo Mateo (born 1953)
- Mathias – Mildred Esther Mathias (1906–1995)
- Mathieu – Charles Marie Joseph Mathieu (1791–1873)
- Matr. – Alphonse Louis Paul Matruchot (1863–1921)
- Matsum. – Jinzō Matsumura (1856–1928)
- Matt. – Heinrich Gottfried von Mattuschka (1734–1779)
- Mattana – Efisio Mattana (fl. 2012)
- Mattei – Giovanni Ettore Mattei (1865–1943)
- Matteri – Celina Maria Matteri (1943–2004)
- Mattf. – Johannes Mattfeld (1895–1951)
- Matthäs – Ursula Matthäs (born 1949)
- Matthei – Oscar R. Matthei (born 1935)
- Matthew – George Frederick Matthew (1837–1923)
- Matthews – Henry John Matthews (1859–1909)
- Matthiesen – Franz Matthiesen (1878–1914)
- Mattick – Wilhelm Fritz Mattick (1901–1984)
- Mattioli – Pietro (Pier) Andrea Gregorio Mattioli (Matthiolus) (1501–1577)
- Mattir. – Oreste Mattirolo (1856–1947)
- Mattos – Joáo Rodrigues de Mattos (1926–2022)
- Mattox – Karl R. Mattox (born 1936)
- Matuda – Eizi Matuda (1894–1978)
- Maturb. – Rudi A. Maturbongs (fl. 2000)
- Maulder – Ricky G. Maulder (fl. 1995)
- Maund – Benjamin Maund (1790–1863)
- Maurizio – Adam M. Maurizio (1862–1941)
- Maury – Paul Jean Baptiste Maury (1858–1893)
- Mavrodiev – Evgenij Vladimirovich Mavrodiev (fl. 1999)
- Maw – George Maw (1832–1912)
- M.A.Wall – M. A. Wall (fl. 2007)
- Maxim. – Carl Maximowicz (1827–1891)
- Maxon – William Ralph Maxon (1877–1948)
- Maxwell – T.C.Maxwell (1822–1908)
- Maynard – David J. Maynard (fl. 2008)
- Mayr – Heinrich Mayr (1854–1911)
- M.Backlund – Maria Backlund (fl. 2007)
- M.Baker – Matthew L. Baker (fl. 2016)
- M.B.Bayer – Martin Bruce Bayer (born 1935)
- M.Bieb. – Friedrich August Marschall von Bieberstein (1768–1826)
- M.Blackw. – Meredith Blackwell (born 1940)
- M.B.Moss – Marion Beatrice Moss (born 1903)
- M.Broun – Maurice Broun (1906–1979)
- M.B.Schwarz – Marie Beatrice Schol-Schwarz (1898–1969)
- M.B.Scott – Munro Briggs Scott (1887–1917)
- M.B.Thomas – Mason Blanchard Thomas (1866–1912)
- M.B.Viswan. – M. B. Viswanathan (fl. 2000)
- M.B.Welch – Marcus Baldwin Welch (1895–1942)
- M.Caball. – Miguel Caballero Deloya (fl. 1969)
- McAll. – Hugh A. McAllister (fl. 1993)
- McCann – Yale Mervin Charles McCann (1899–1980)
- M.C.Chang – Mei Chen Chang (born 1933)
- McClell. – John McClelland (1805–1883)
- McClure – Floyd Alonzo McClure (1897–1970)
- McComb – Jennifer Anne McComb (born 1943)
- McCord – David Ross McCord (1844–1930)
- McCormick – Robert McCormick (1800–1890)
- McCoy – Frederick McCoy (1817–1899)
- McCraith – Gerald McCraith (1909–2009)
- McCune – Bruce Pettit McCune (born 1952)
- McDade – Lucinda A. McDade (born 1953)
- McDonald – William H. McDonald (1837–1902)
- M.C.E.Amaral – Maria do Carmo Estanislau do Amaral (fl. 1991)
- M.C.Ferguson – Margaret Clay Ferguson (1863–1951)
- McGill. – Donald McGillivray (1935–2012)
- McGlynn – William Henry McGlynn (1876-1956)
- McGregor – Ronald Leighton McGregor (1919–2012)
- M.Chandler – Marjorie Elizabeth Jane Chandler (1897–1983)
- M.Cheng – Mien Cheng (1899–1987)
- McIlv. – Charles McIlvaine (1840–1909)
- McIvor – William Graham McIvor (1824–1876)
- M.C.Johnst. – Marshall Conring Johnston (born 1930)
- McKie – Ernest Norman McKie (1882–1948)
- McKinney – Harold Hall McKinney (1889–1976)
- McLennan – Ethel Irene McLennan (1891–1983)
- M.C.Martínez – María Cristina Martínez (born 1974)
- McMillan – Adrian John Stuart McMillan (1915–2008)
- McNeill – John McNeill (born 1933)
- M.C.Pace – Matthew C. Pace (fl. 2017)
- McQuoid – Nathan K. McQuoid (fl. 2002)
- McVaugh – Rogers McVaugh (1909–2009)
- M.D.Barrett – Matthew David Barrett (born 1974)
- M.D.Correa – Mireya D. Correa A. (1940–2022)
- M.D.Ferrero – Michael D. Ferrero (born 1968)
- M.D.Hend. – Mayda Doris Henderson (1928–2015)
- M.D.Yuan – Ming-Deng Yuan (fl. 2020)
- Mears – James Austin Mears (born 1944)
- M.E.Collinson – Margaret E. Collinson (fl. 1980)
- Medik. – Friedrich Kasimir Medikus (1736–1808)
- Medlicott – Henry Benedict Medlicott (1829–1905)
- Meehan – Thomas Meehan (1826–1901)
- Meekiong – Kalu Meekiong (fl. 2005)
- Meenks – Jan L. D. Meenks (fl. 1985)
- Meerb. – Nicolaas Meerburgh (1734–1814)
- Meerow – Alan W. Meerow (born 1952)
- Meese – David Meese (1723–1770)
- Meeuwen – M. S. Knaap-van Meeuwen (born 1936)
- M.E.French – Malcolm E. French (fl. 2007)
- Mehrotra – Bishan N. Mehrotra (born 1936)
- Meier – Fred Campbell Meier (1893–1938)
- Meigen – Johann Wilhelm Meigen (1764–1845)
- Meijden – Ruud van der Meijden (1945–2007)
- Meijer – Willem Meijer (1923–2003)
- Meijer Drees – E. Meijer Drees (fl. 1938)
- Meikle – Robert Desmond Meikle (1923–2021)
- Meinecke – Johann Ludwig Georg Meinecke (1721–1823)
- Meins – Claus Meins (1806–1873)
- Meinsh. – Karl Friedrich Meinshausen (1819–1899)
- Meisel – Max Meisel (1892–1969)
- Meisn. – Carl Daniel Friedrich Meissner (1800–1874)
- M.E.Jones – Marcus Eugene Jones (1852–1934)
- Mela – Aukusti Juhana Mela (1846–1904)
- M.E.L.Archer – Mary Ellinor Lucy Archer (fl. 1917)
- Melch. – Hans Melchior (1894–1984)
- Melikyan – Aleksander Pavlovich Melikyan (1935–2008)
- Melvill – James Cosmo Mevill (1845–1929)
- Melville – Ronald Melville (1903–1985)
- Melvin – Lionel Melvin (1907–1997)
- M.E.Morales – María Eugenia Morales-Puentes (fl. 2008)
- Menabde – Vladimir Levanovich Menabde (1898–1981)
- Menadue – Yvonne Menadue (fl. 1986)
- Mendel – Gregor Mendel (1822–1884)
- Mend.-Heuer – Ilse R. Mendoza-Heuer (1919–2013)
- Mendonça – Francisco de Ascencão Mendonça (1889–1982)
- M.E.Newton – Martha Elizabeth Newton (1941–2020)
- Menezes – Carlos Azevedo de Menezes (1863–1928)
- Menge – Franz Anton Menge (1808–1880)
- Mennega – Alberta Maria Wilhelmina Mennega (1912–2009)
- Mentz – August Mentz (1867–1944)
- Menyh. – László Menyhárth (1849–1897)
- Menzel – Paul Julius Menzel (1864–1927)
- Menzies – Archibald Menzies (1754–1842)
- Mérat – François Victor Mérat de Vaumartoise (1780–1851)
- Meredith – Louisa Anne Meredith (1812–1895)
- Mereles – Fátima Mereles (born 1953)
- Mereschk. – Konstantin Mereshkovski (1855–1921)
- Merkl. – Felix F. Merklinger (fl. 2017)
- Merr. – Elmer Drew Merrill (1876–1956)
- Merriam – Clinton Hart Merriam (1855–1942)
- Mert. – Franz Carl Mertens (1764–1831)
- Merxm. – Hermann Merxmüller (1920–1988)
- Mesfin – Mesfin Tadesse (born 1951)
- Mesnil – Félix Étienne Pierre Mesnil (1868–1938)
- Messina – Andre Messina (fl. 2010)
- Messmer – Pearl R. Messmer (fl. 1940s–1950s)
- Mett. – Georg Heinrich Mettenius (1823–1866)
- Metusala – Destario Metusala (fl. 2009)
- Metzg. – Johann Metzger (1789–1852)
- Mexia – Ynés Enriquetta Julietta Mexía (1870–1938)
- Mey.-Berth. – Brigitte Meyer-Berthaud (fl. 2001)
- Meyen – Franz Julius Ferdinand Meyen (1804–1840)
- Meyl. – Charles Meylan (1868–1941)
- Mez – Carl Christian Mez (1866–1944)
- M.F.Bourdon – M. F. Bourdon (fl. 2004)
- M.F.Fay – Michael Francis Fay (born 1960)
- M.Fleisch. – Max Fleischer (1861–1930)
- M.F.L.Fitzp. – Mary Frances Linder Fitzpatrick (fl. 1898)
- M.F.Newman – Mark Fleming Newman (born 1959)
- M.G.Brooks – Maurice Graham Brooks (1900–1993)
- M.G.Calder – Mary Gordon Calder (c. 1906–1992)
- M.G.Gilbert – Michael George Gilbert (born 1943)
- M.G.Harr. – M.G. Harrington (fl. 2010)
- M.G.Henry – Mary Gibson Henry (1884–1967)
- M.Gómez – Manuel Gómez de la Maya y Jiménez (1867–1916)
- M.Gordon – M. Gordon (fl. 1920)
- M.Gray – Max Gray (1929–2015)
- M.H.Alford – Mac Haverson Alford (born 1975)
- M.HeLi – Min Hui Li (fl. 2004)
- M.Hiroe – Minosuke Hiroe (1914–2000)
- M.H.Hoffm. – Matthias H. Hoffmann (fl. 1998)
- M.H.J.van der Meer – Maarten H.J. van der Meer (fl. 2019)
- M.Hopkins – Milton Hopkins (1906–1983)
- M.Hotta – Mitsuru Hotta (1937–2015)
- M.Howe – Marshall Avery Howe (1867–1936)
- Micevski – Kiril Micevski (1926–2002)
- Michaelis – Peter Michaelis (1900–1975)
- Michelang. – Fabián Armando Michelangeli (born 1970)
- Micheli – Marc Micheli (1844–1902)
- Michelis – Friedrich Bernhard (Bernard) Ferdinand Michelis (1815–1886)
- Mich.Möller – Michael Möller (fl. 2009)
- Michon – Jean-Hippolyte Michon (1806–1881)
- Michx. – André Michaux (1746–1803)
- Mickel – John Thomas Mickel (1934–2024)
- M.I.Dawson – Murray Ian Dawson (born 1962)
- Middend. – Alexander von Middendorff (1815–1894)
- Middled. – Harry Middleditch (born 1927)
- Miehe – Hugo Miehe (1875–1932)
- Miers – John Miers (1789–1879)
- Mig. – Emil Friedrich August Walter (Walther) Migula (1863–1938)
- Migo – Hisao Migo (1900–1985)
- Migush. – Emilia Filippovna Migushova (1923–2000)
- Mik – Josef (Joseph) Mik (1839–1900)
- Mike L.Grant – Michael Livingstone Grant (born 1962)
- Mikl.-Maclay – Nikolaj Nikolajewitsch Miklouho-Maclay (1846–1888)
- Mildbr. – Johannes Mildbraed (1879–1954)
- Milde – Carl August Julius Milde (1824–1871)
- Mill. – Philip Miller (1691–1771)
- Millais – John Guille Millais (1865–1931)
- Millardet – Pierre-Marie-Alexis Millardet (1838–1902)
- Millott – Jacqueline C. Millott (born 1981)
- Millsp. – Charles Frederick Millspaugh (1854–1923)
- Milne – Colin Milne (1743–1815)
- Milne-Edw. – Alphonse Milne-Edwards (1835–1900)
- Milne-Redh. – Edgar Wolston Bertram Handsley Milne-Redhead (1906–1996)
- Miq. – Friedrich Anton Wilhelm Miquel (1811–1871)
- Miranda – Faustino Miranda (1905–1964)
- Mirb. – Charles-François Brisseau de Mirbel (1776–1854)
- Mirzoeva – Nina Vasilevna Mirzoeva (1908–1999)
- Mitch. – John Mitchell (1711–1768)
- Mitford – Algernon Bertram Freeman-Mitford, 1st Baron Redesdale (1837–1916)
- Mitt. – William Mitten (1819–1906)
- Miyabe – Kingo Miyabe (1860–1951)
- Miyake – Kiichi Miyake (1876–1964)
- Miyoshi – Manabu Miyoshi (1861–1939)
- Mizg. – Olga F. Mizgireva (1908–1994)
- Mizut. – Masami Mizutani (1930–2020)
- M.Jacobs – Marius Jacobs (1929–1983)
- M.J.A.Simpson – Margaret Jane Annand Simpson (1920–1996)
- M.J.Reed – Merton J. Reed (fl. 1939)
- M.J.Roe – Margaret James Roe (fl. 1961)
- M.J.Turton – Margaret Joan Turton (born 1954)
- M.J.Wingf. – Michael John Wingfield (born 1954)
- M.J.Wynne – Michael James Wynne (born 1940)
- M.Kato – Masahiro Kato (born 1946)
- M.Knowles – Matilda Cullen Knowles (1864–1933)
- M.Koch – Marcus A. Koch (born 1967)
- M.Kuhlm. – Moysés Kuhlmann (1906–1972)
- M.Lainz – Manuel Laínz (1923–2024)
- M.Lange – Knud Morten Lange (1919–2003) (son of Jakob Emanuel Lange)
- M.L.Bowerman – Mary Leolin Bowerman (1908–2005)
- M.Leon – Miguel de Leon (fl. 2015)
- M.L.Green – Mary Letitia Green (1886–1978)
- M.L.Williams – Mark L. Williams (fl. 2006)
- M.Lyons – Mike Lyons (born 1966)
- M.Martens – Martin Martens (1797–1863)
- M.M.Mart.Ort. – María Montserrat Martínez Ortega (born 1969)
- M.M.Mejía – Milciades Manuel Mejía (born 1952)
- M.N.Correa – Maevia Noemí Correa (1914–2005)
- M.Neal – Marie Catherine Neal (1889–1965)
- M.Nee – Michael Nee (born 1947)
- M.Nishida – Makoto Nishida (1927–1998)
- M.N.Philipson – Melva Noeline Philipson (1925–2015)
- M.N.Tamura – Minoru N. Tamura (fl. 1993)
- Moc. – José Mariano Mociño (1757–1820)
- M.O.Dillon – Michael O. Dillon (born 1947)
- Moeliono – B. Moeliono (fl. 1960)
- Moench – Conrad Moench (1744–1805)
- Moestrup – Øjvind Moestrup (born 1941)
- Moezel – P.G.van der Moezel (fl. 1987)
- Moffett – Rodney Oliver Moffett (born 1937)
- Mogea – J. P. Mogea (born 1947)
- Mogensen – Gert Steen Mogensen (born 1944)
- Moggr. – John Traherne Moggridge (1842–1874)
- Mohl – Hugo von Mohl (1805–1872)
- Mohlenbr. – Robert H. Mohlenbrock (born 1931)
- Möhring – Paul Heinrich Gerhard Möhring (1710–1792)
- Moir – William Whitmore Goodale Moir (1896–1985)
- Molau – Ulf Molau (born 1949)
- Moldenh. – Johann Jacob Paul Moldenhawer (1766–1827)
- Moldenke – Harold Norman Moldenke (1909–1996)
- Molina – Juan Ignacio Molina (1737–1829)
- Mollemans – Frans Hendricus Mollemans (fl. 1992)
- Molliard – Marin Molliard (1866–1944)
- Molloy – Brian Peter John Molloy (1930–2022)
- Mols – Johan B. Mols (fl. 2000)
- Molyneux – William Mitchell Molyneux (born 1935)
- Momiy. – Yasuichi Momiyama (1904– 2000)
- Moncada – Milagros Moncada Ferrera (born 1937)
- Mönk. – Wilhelm Mönkemeyer (1862–1938)
- Monnard – Jean Pierre Monnard (born 1791)
- Mont. – Jean Pierre François Camille Montagne (1784–1866)
- Montgom. – Frederick Howard Montgomery (1902– 1978)
- Montin – Lars Jonasson Montin (1723–1785)
- Montrouz. – Jean Xavier Hyacinthe Montrouzier (1820–1897)
- Moon – Alexander Moon (died 1825)
- Moore – David Moore (1808–1879)
- Moq. – Christian Horace Bénédict Alfred Moquin-Tandon (1804–1863)
- Morales – Sebastiàn Alfredo de Morales (1823–1900)
- Moran – Reid Venable Moran (1916–2010)
- Morat – Philippe Morat (born 1937)
- Morawetz – Wilfried Morawetz (1951–2007)
- Morden – Clifford W. Morden (born 1955-)
- More – Alexander Goodman More (1830–1895)
- Moretti – Giuseppe L. Moretti (1782–1853)
- Morgan – Andrew Price Morgan (1836–1907)
- Moric. – Stefano Moricand (1779–1854) (also known as Moïse Étienne Moricand)
- Morillo – Gilberto N. Morillo (born 1944)
- Moris – Giuseppe Giacinto Moris (1796–1869)
- Morison – Robert Morison (1620–1683)
- Moritz – Johann Wilhelm Karl Moritz (1797–1866)
- Moritzi – Alexander Moritzi (1806–1850)
- Morong – Thomas Morong (1827–1894)
- Morris – John Morris (1810–1886)
- Morrison – Alexander Morrison (1849–1913)
- Morrone – Osvaldo Morrone (1957–2011)
- Mort – Mark E. Mort (fl. 2014)
- Morton – Julius Sterling Morton (1832–1902)
- Moss – Charles Edward Moss (1870–1930)
- Mosyakin – Sergei Leonidovich Mosyakin (born 1961)
- Mot.Ito – Motomi Ito (born 1956)
- Motley – James Motley (1822–1859)
- Mottet – Séraphin Joseph Mottet (1861–1930)
- Motyka – Józef Motyka (1900–1984)
- Moug. – Jean-Baptiste Mougeot (1776–1858)
- Mouill. – Pierre Mouillefert (1846–1903)
- Mouterde – Paul Mouterde (1892–1972)
- Moxley – George Loucks Moxley (1871–1963)
- Mozaff. - Valiollah Mozaffarian (born 1953)
- M.Peck – Morton Eaton Peck (1871–1959)
- M.P.Nayar – Madhavan Parameswaran Nayar (1932–2016)
- M.Prieto – María Prieto (fl. 2008)
- M.Prins – Marie Prins (born 1948)
- M.Proctor – Michael Charles Faraday Proctor (1929–2017)
- M.Q.Liang – Min Qing Liang (fl. 1984)
- M.R.Almeida – Marselein Rusario Almeida (1939–2017)
- M.R.Davis – M. R. Davis (fl. 1969)
- M.R.Hend. – Murray Ross Henderson (1899–1982)
- M.Roem. – Max Joseph Roemer (1791–1849)
- M.Roscoe – Margaret Roscoe (ca. 1786–1840)
- M.R.Schomb. – Moritz Richard Schomburgk (1811–1891)
- M.Sabu – Mamiyil Sabu (born 1959)
- M.S.Baker – Milo Samuel Baker (1868–1961)
- M.S.Balakr. – Madura S. Balakrishnan (1917–1990)
- M.S.Br. – Margaret Sibella Brown (1866–1961)
- M.Schub. – Michael Schubert (1787–1860)
- M.Schultze – Maximilian Johann Siegmund Schultze (1825–1874)
- M.Seq. – Miguel Pinto da Silva Menezes de Sequeira (born 1964)
- M.Serna – Marcela Serna-González (fl. 2009)
- M.Serrano – Miguel Serrano (fl. 2017)
- M.Serres – Pierre Marcel Toussaint de Serres de Mesplès (1783–1862)
- M.S.Hussain – Md.Sakhawat Hussain (fl. 2001)
- M.Simmonds – Monique S.J. Simmonds (fl. 2003)
- M.S.Khan – Mohammad Salar Khan (1924-2002)
- M.Sousa – Mario Sousa (1940–2017)
- M.S.Tang – Mo Shih Tang (fl. 2013)
- M.S.Young – Mary Sophie Young (1872–1919)
- M.Taylor – Mary Ruth Fussel Jackson Taylor (born 1908)
- M.T.Lange – Morten Thomsen Lange (1824–1875)
- M.T.Martin – Margaret Trevena Martin (1905–2000)
- M.T.Mathieson – Michael T. Mathieson (fl. 2010)
- M.T.Murillo – María Teresz Murillo (1929–2017)
- M.T.Strong – Mark Tuthill Strong (born 1954)
- Mudd – William Mudd (1830–1879)
- Mudie – Robert Mudie (1777–1842)
- Muehlenbeck – Heinrich Gustav Muehlenbeck (1798–1845)
- Muehlenpf. – Philipp August Friedrich Mühlenpfordt (1803–1891)
- Muhl. – Gotthilf Heinrich Ernst Muhlenberg (1753–1815)
- Muirhead – Clara Winsome Muirhead (1915–1985)
- Müll.Arg. – Johannes Müller Argoviensis (1828–1896)
- Müll.Dornst. – Karl Müller (botanist, born 1893) (1893–1955)
- Müll.Frib. – Karl Müller (bryologist, born 1881) (1881–1955) (of Freiburg)
- Müll.Hal. – Johann Karl (Carl) August (Friedrich Wilhelm) Müller (1818–1899)
- Müll.-Thurg. – Hermann Müller (1850–1927)
- Mumm. – Klaus Mummenhoff (born 1956)
- Munby – Giles Munby (1813–1876)
- Münchh. – Otto von Münchhausen (1716–1774)
- Mund – Johannes Ludwig Leopold Mund (1791–1831)
- Munn – Mancel Thornton Munn (1887–1956)
- Muñoz – Carlos Muñoz Pizarro (1913–1976)
- Muñoz Garm. – Jose Felix Munoz Garmendia (born 1949)
- Munro – William Munro (1818–1880)
- Munson – Thomas Volney Munson (1843–1913)
- Munz – Philip Alexander Munz (1892–1974)
- Murb. – Svante Samuel Murbeck (1859–1946)
- Murch. – Roderick Impey Murchison (1792–1871)
- Murdock – Andrew G. Murdock (fl. 2008)
- Murith – Laurent Joseph Murith (1742–1816)
- Muroi – Hiroshi Muroi (1914–2012)
- Murr – Josef Murr (1864–1932)
- Murray – Johan Andreas Murray (1740–1791)
- Muschl. – Reinhold Conrad Muschler (1882–1957)
- Mustaqim – Wendy A. Mustaqim (fl. 2019)
- Mutis – José Celestino Bruno Mutis (1732–1808)
- M.V.Agab. – Mariam V. Agababjan (born 1964)
- M.Vahl – Martin Vahl II (1869–1946) (not to be confused with Vahl – Martin Vahl (1749–1804))
- M.V.Viswan. – M.Venkatesan Viswanathan (born 1942)
- M.Walcott – Mary Morris Vaux Walcott (1860–1940)
- M.Wallis – M. Wallis (fl. 1866)
- M.W.Chase – Mark Wayne Chase (born 1951)
- M.Williams – Margot Williams (fl. 1984)
- M.W.McDonald – Maurice W. McDonald (fl. 1996)
- M.Wolff – Manfred Wolff (born 1952)

== N–Z ==
| Contents: Top | A | B | C | D | E F | G | H | I J | K L | M | N O | P | Q R | S | T U V | W X Y Z |

To find entries for N–Z, use the table of contents above.

== See also ==
- List of South African plant botanical authors
- List of botanists
- Category:Botanists
- List of Russian botanists
- List of zoologists by author abbreviation
