= Pliocene flora of Frankfurt am Main =

Historical botany

It is suggested a late Pliocene age (Reuverian) for this flora. Palynofloras from drill cores in the surroundings of Frankfurt am Main and Hanau also suggests a late Pliocene age. The Pliocene flora of Frankfurt am Main described by Karl Mädler during the first half of the twentieth century is a key flora for the European Pliocene.

In total 16 gymnosperm species in 15 genera and 73 angiosperm species (of which 15 could not be assigned to a genus) in 40 genera are recognised in the leaf record. Main characteristics of the flora are the high diversity of conifers, deciduous angiosperm genera such as Eucommia, Magnolia and Sassafras, a diverse assemblage of exclusively deciduous Fagaceae, including six species of oaks, the high diversity of Rosaceae, whereas evergreen taxa are shrubs typical of the understorey as Buxus, Ilex, Pachysandra, Prunus lusitanica and Viscum.

These features indicate cool temperate climatic conditions comparable to present-day Lugano in southern Switzerland. The flora shows a strong biogeographic link with East Asia, surprisingly high levels of Pliocene endemisms and that the European flora was more diverse in woody species shortly before the onset of the major Pleistocene glaciations than today. The early part of the Pliocene (5.3–3.6 Ma) was characterised by warm conditions (ca. 3 °C higher global surface temperatures) and higher sea levels (10–20 m) and slightly higher CO_{2} concentrations.

During the second part of the Pliocene, gradual cooling culminated in a significant intensification of northern hemispheric glaciation at ca. 2.75 Ma. Despite this, many exotic taxa persisted as relicts from older epochs and modern diversity patterns of trees and shrubs across the Northern Hemisphere were established only during and after the major Pleistocene glaciations.

== History of the fossil findings ==
Fossil plant remains had been discovered in the excavation pit of the Höchst lock in 1884, a sandy clay layer, many more fossil seeds, fruits and leaves were uncovered in 1885 during the construction of the Frankfurt water clarifier near Niederrad. The works on these plant fossils were edited by GEYLER & KINKELIN and their results were published in the 15th volume of the Treatises of the Senckenbergische Naturforschende Gesellschaft in 1887. The plant fossils are kept at the Naturmuseum Senckenberg in Frankfurt am Main.

== Geography ==
The fossil leaves comprising the flora have been recovered in Niederrad which is a quarter of Frankfurt am Main, Germany. It is part of the Ortsbezirk Süd and is subdivided into the Stadtbezirke Niederrad-Nord, Niederrad-Süd and the new Niederrad-West. Niederrad is bordered in the north by the River Main, in the west by the A5 Autobahn, in the south by the Main Railway and Flughafenstraße, and in the east by the former Niederrad Racecourse, Kennedyallee and the Main-Neckar Railway.

== Gallery showing the district of Niederrad in Frankfurt am Main where the fossil site is located ==
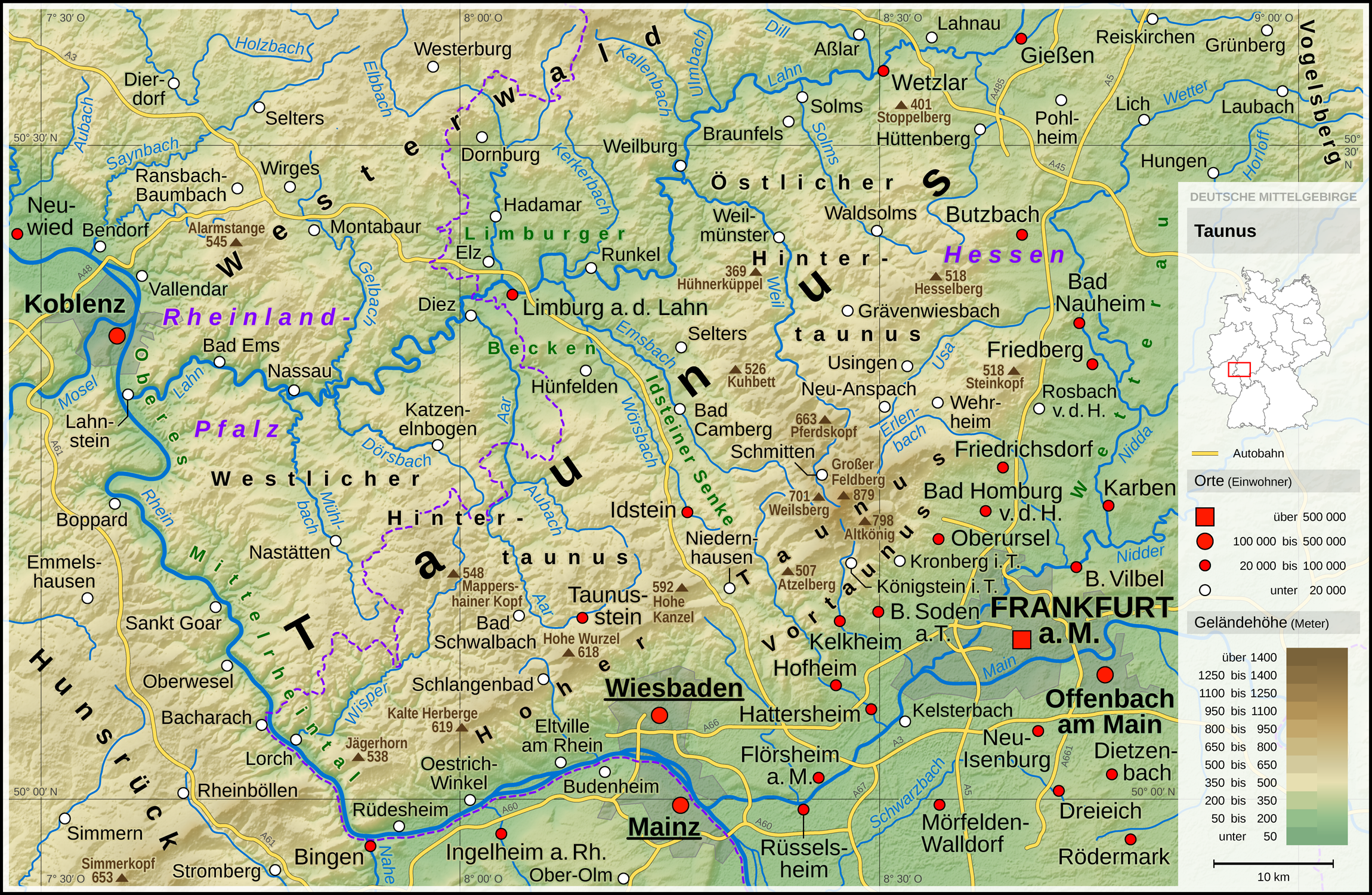
Map showing Frankfurt and surroundings

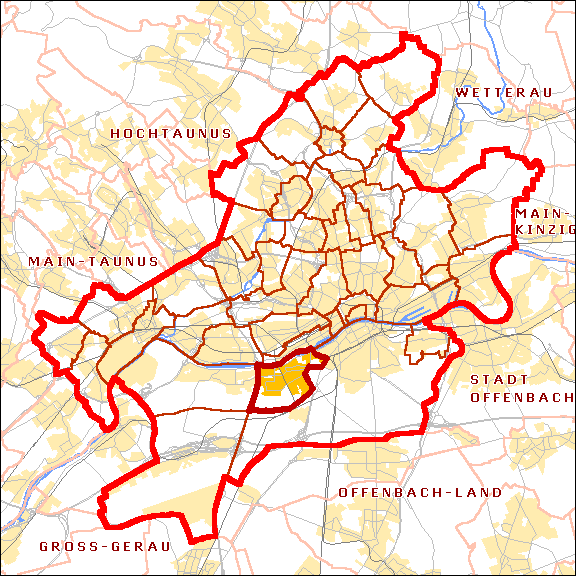
Frankfurt map showing Niederrad

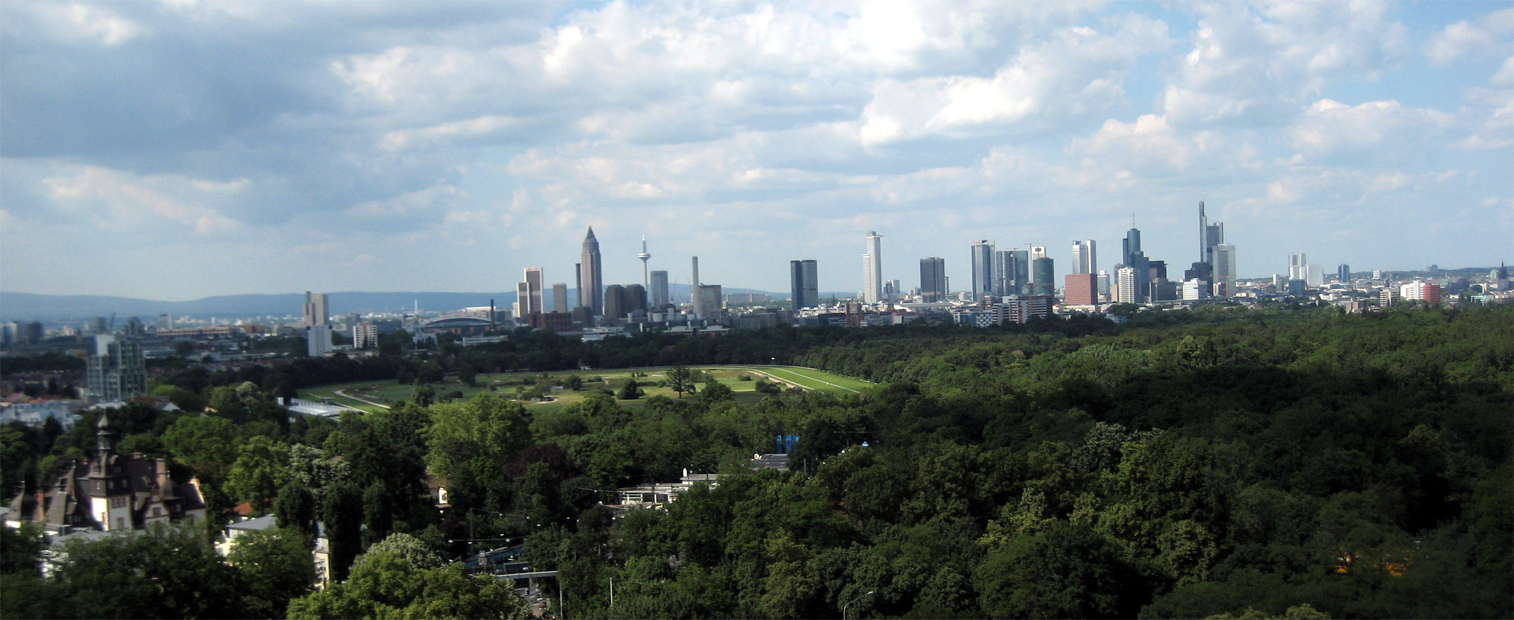
Racetrack

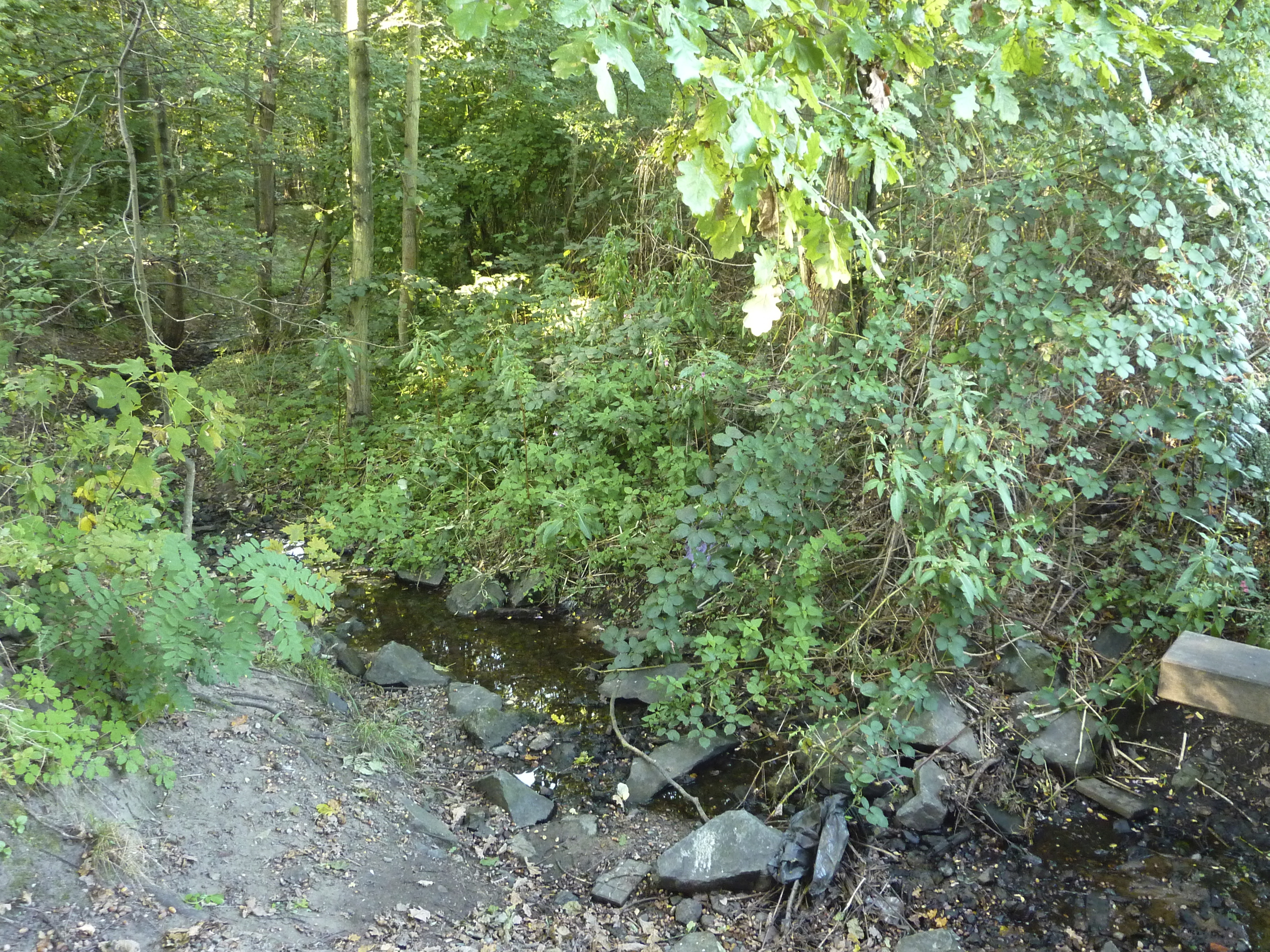
Near Koenigsbach train station in Louisa west side

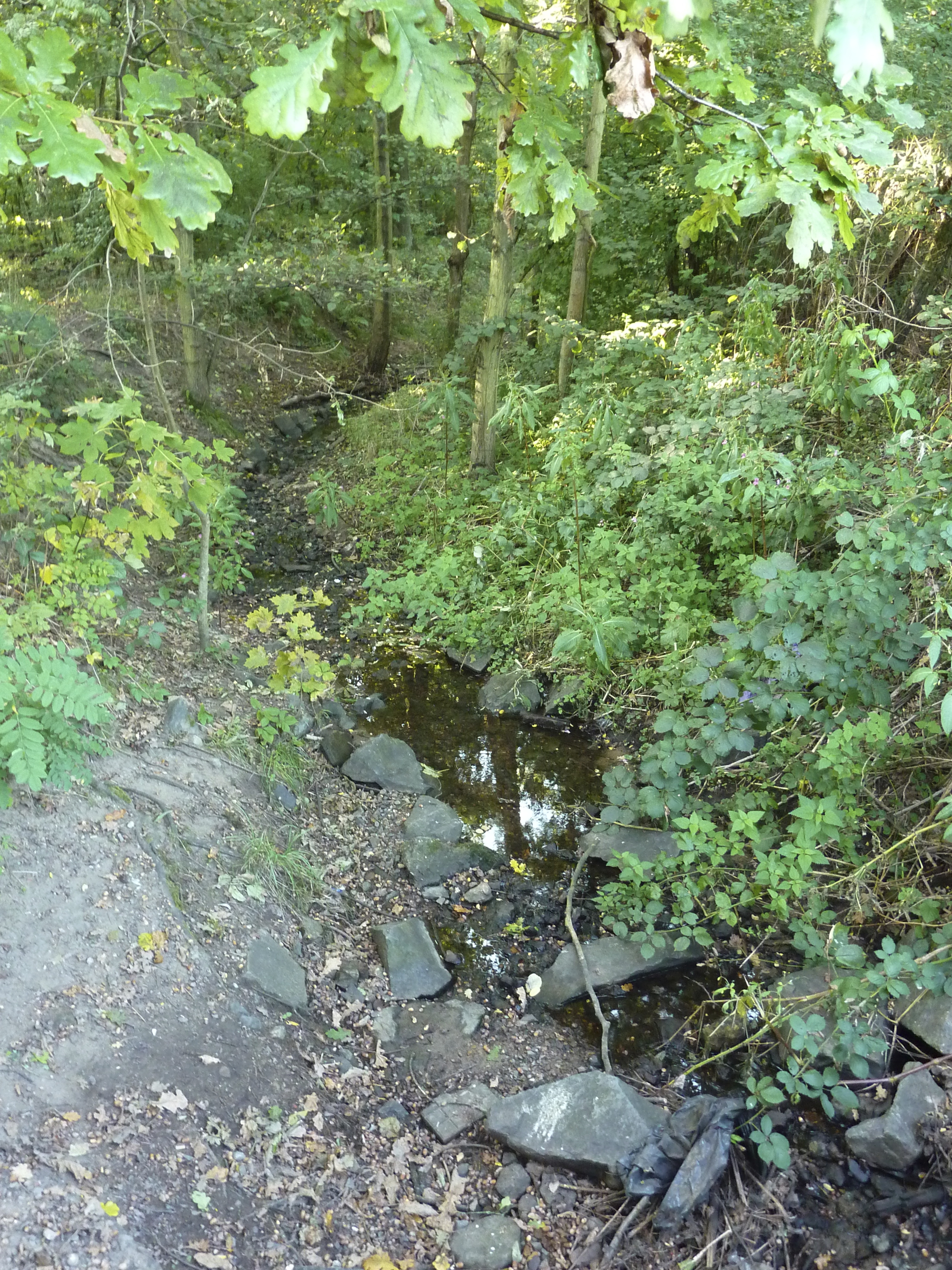
Koenigsbach train station in Louisa Westseite

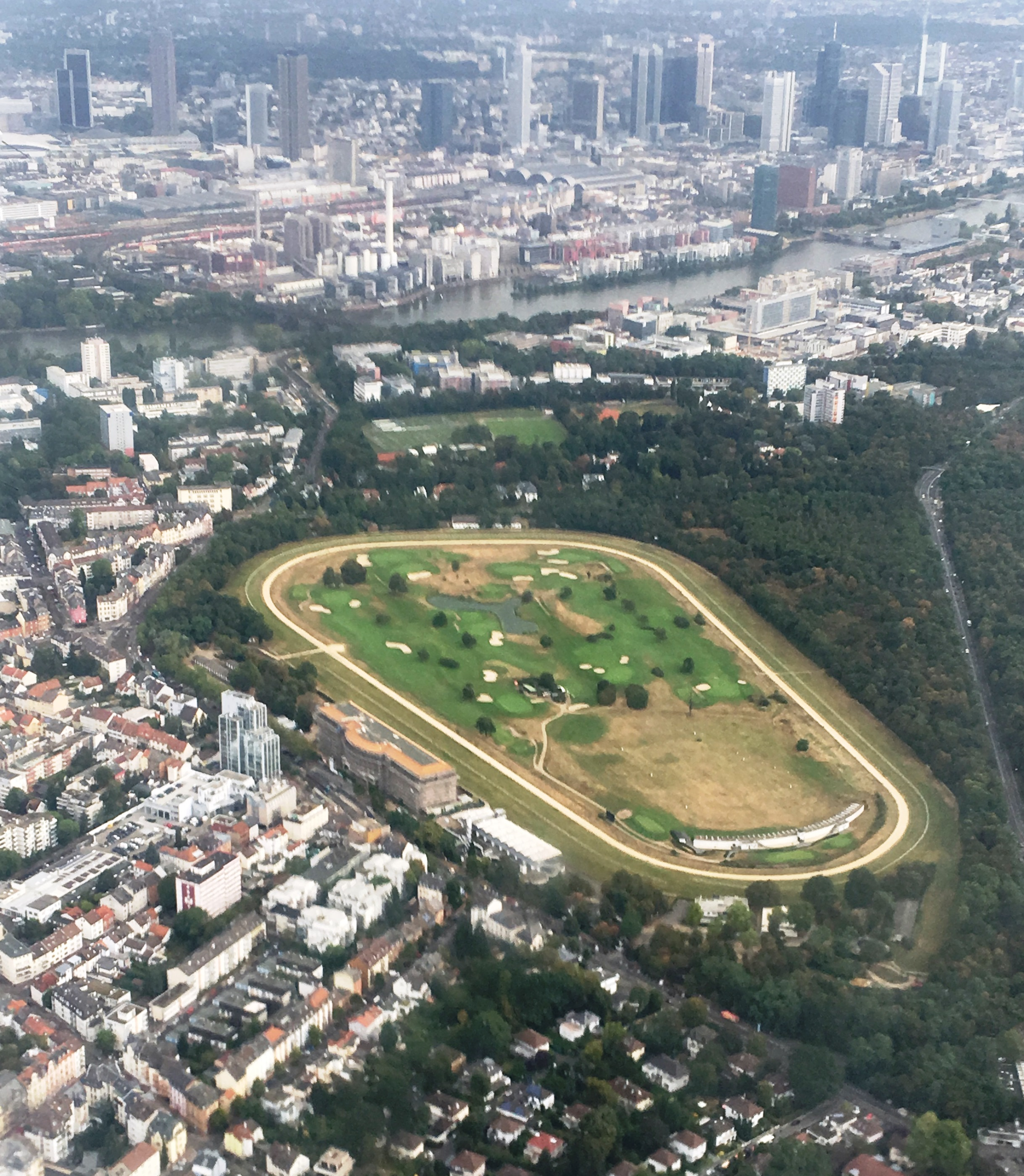
Niederrad racecourse in Frankfurt

== Fossil plant species so far described from the deposits ==
=== Gymnosperms ===
- Ginkgoaceae

- †Ginkgo adiantoides, several leaves.

- Cupressaceae

- †Glyptostrobus europaeus, 2 leafy shoots

- †Taxodium dubium leafy shoots

- †Sequoia abietina, leafy shots

- †Metasequoia langsdorfii, synonym: Sequoia langsdorfii.

- †Cryptomeria rhenana, several twigs, very similar to Cryptomeria japonica.

- Calocedrus sp.

- Sciadopityaceae

- †Sciadopitys tertiaria, (abaxial cuticle).

- Taxaceae

- †Cephalotaxus pliocaenica, several needles

- Taxus baccata, needle fragments.

- Torreya nucifera, needles and seeds.

- Pinaceae

- Abies alba fossilis synonym Abies pectinata fossilis, a needle and one seed cone.
- †Abies sclereidea, two needle fragments.

- †Cathaya loehri, originally named: Keteleeria loehri.

- †Picea omoricoides, several needles, like Picea omorika, .

- Pinus sylvestris synonym Pinus montana, one seed cone.
- †Pinus timleri, cones.

- †Pseudotsuga kinkelinii, needle leaves and cones.
- †Pseudotsuga sclereidea, two needle fragments, most like Pseudotsuga menziesii.

- †Thuja pliocaenica
- †Tsuga europaea, 15 needles, most like Tsuga caroliniana.

=== Angiosperms, dicots ===
- Magnoliaceae

- †Magnolia liblarensis, leaf fragment.
- †Magnolia waltheri, incomplete leaf.

- Lauraceae

- †Sassafras ferretianum, a complete leaf.

- Santalaceae

- †Viscum miquelii, one leaf.

- †Viscum pliozänicum, leaf and epidermal preparation.

- Buxaceae

- †Buxus pliocaenica, one entire leaf and a leafy shot.

- Buxus sempervirens fossilis, leaves and fruit cupules.

- †Pachysandra europaea, one incomplete leaf.

- Cercidiphyllaceae

- †Cercidiphyllum crenatum, a leaf fragment, similar to Cercidiphyllum japonicum.

- Hamamelidaceae

- †Parrotia pristina an incomplete leaf, closely related to Parrotia persica.

- †Corylopsis urselensis

- Altingiaceae

- †Liquidambar europaea, an incomplete leaf, close to Liquidambar orientalis.
- †Liquidambar pliocaenicum (infructescences).

- Juglandaceae

- Carya ovata fruits.
- †Carya globosa one nut.
- †Carya longicarpa
- Carya tomentosa fossilis (synonym Carya alba fossilis), fruits.

- Juglans cinerea fossilis, several nuts.

- †Pterocarya paradisiaca, a complete leaflet.

- Fagaceae

- Castanea sativa, a leaf fragment.

- †Fagus kraeuselii, complete leaves, closest similarity is with the extant East Asian Fagus crenata and Fagus hayatae.

- †Quercus kubinyii, (fragmentary leaf).
- †Quercus praecastaneifolia (obate leaf).
- †Quercus roburoides, lobate leaves, it closely resembles Quercus petraea and Quercus dalechampii,
- †Quercus pseudocastanea, complete and incomplete leaves. Has similarities to Quercus griffithii and Quercus dentata.

- Betulaceae

- †Alnus gaudinii, (complete and incomplete leaves), the nearest living relative for this fossil species is the Caucasian alder, Alnus subcordata that differs from the fossil species by slightly wider leaves.

- †Betula similis, complete and incomplete leaves, it is similar to Betula platyphylla.
- †Betula longisquamosa, fruits.

- †Carpinus grandis (leaf and fruits), very similar to Carpinus betulus.
- †Carpinus uniserrata , a complete leaf, similar to Carpinus caroliniana produces similar but wider and coarsely serrate leaves.

- Corylus avellana (fruits).
- †Corylus kolakovskyi, (complete and incomplete leaves), very similar to Corylus maxima and Corylus avellana.

- Cannabaceae

- †Celtis trachytica, (incomplete leaf).

- Ulmaceae

- †Planera ungeri, leaves.

- †Ulmus carpinoides, complete leaf, quite similar to Ulmus minor.
- †Ulmus pyramidalis, complete leaf.

- †Zelkova zelkovifolia, complete leaves.

- Cucurbitaceae

- Trichosanthes sp., (complete leaf).

- Salicaceae

- †Populus balsamoides, a complete leaf.
- †Populus canescentoides , complete leaves.
- †Populus gregorii, incomplete leaves.
- †Populus populina, complete and incomplete leaves.

- †Salix lavateri , complete and incomplete leaves.

- Sapindaceae

- †Acer brachyphyllum similar to the extant Acer obtusifolium.
- †Acer dombeyopsis, (partial leaves and abaxial cuticle).
- †Acer integerrimum, an incomplete leaf.
- †Acer palaeo-miyabei
- Acer platanoides aff.
- †Acer pyrenaicum, a complete leaf.
- †Acer subcampestre, a complete leaf.
- †Acer viburnoides, a complete leaf, similar to Acer heldreichii.
- †Acer vitiforme, a complete leaf.

- †Aesculus hippocastanoides, complete leaflets, very similar to Aesculus hippocastanum.

- Meliaceae

- †Toona sp., (complete leaflet), similar to Toona sinensis.

- Rosaceae

- †Crataegus pentagynoides, several entire leaves, similar to the extant Crataegus pentagyna.

- Malus sp., a complete leaf with serrulate margin.

- Sorbus aucuparia aff., a complete leaflet.

- Spiraea trichocarpa aff., an entire leaf.

- Prunus lusitanica
- †Prunus aviifolius

- Fabaceae

- †Gleditsia pliocaenica, the modern Gleditsia caspica Desfontaines produces similar foliage and might be the closest extant relative of the fossil taxon, but differs from Gleditsia caspica in broader asymmetrically ovate leaflets and a distinctly crenulate lamina.

- Malvaceae

- †Craigia lobata, a complete leaf.

- †Hibiscus sp., a complete leaf and an abaxial cuticle with trichomes, similar to the extant Hibiscus mutabilis.

- Tilia? sp., isolated bracts.

- Eucommiaceae

- †Eucommia europaea
- †Eucommia szaferi, one leaf and one epidermal preparation.

- Styracaceae

- †Styrax obovatum, two seeds.

- Theaceae

- †Stewartia europaea synonym Stuartia europaea, one fruitlet.

- Aquifoliaceae

- Ilex aquifolium, one entire leaf and several leaf remains.
- †Ilex geissertii, an abaxial cuticle.

- Oleaceae

- †Fraxinus angusta (abaxial cuticle with peltate trichomes).

- Ebenaceae

- Diospyros sp?

- Nymphaeaceae

- †Euryale lissa C. Reid & E. Reid is known from the Pliocene of Höchst, Frankfurt am Main.

=== Angiosperms, monocots ===
- Smilaceae

- Smilax sp.

- Potamogetonaceae

- †Potamogeton medicagoides
