= Carex schmidtii =

Scientific classification
- Kingdom: Plantae
- Clade: Tracheophytes
- Clade: Angiosperms
- Clade: Monocots
- Clade: Commelinids
- Order: Poales
- Family: Cyperaceae
- Genus: Carex
- Species: C. schmidtii

Binomial name
- Carex schmidtii Meinsh.

Species of grass-like plant

Carex schmidtii, also known as Schmidt's sedge, is a sedge that is native parts of eastern Asia including eastern parts of Japan, Korea, Mongolia, China and parts of Russia.

== See also ==
- List of Carex species
