= Carex sedakowii =

Scientific classification
- Kingdom: Plantae
- Clade: Tracheophytes
- Clade: Angiosperms
- Clade: Monocots
- Clade: Commelinids
- Order: Poales
- Family: Cyperaceae
- Genus: Carex
- Species: C. sedakowii

Binomial name
- Carex sedakowii C.A.Mey. ex Meinsh.

Species of grass-like plant

Carex sedakowii, also known as Sedakov's sedge, is a sedge that is native parts of eastern Asia including eastern parts of China, Mongolia, Korea and parts of far eastern Russia.

== See also ==
- List of Carex species
