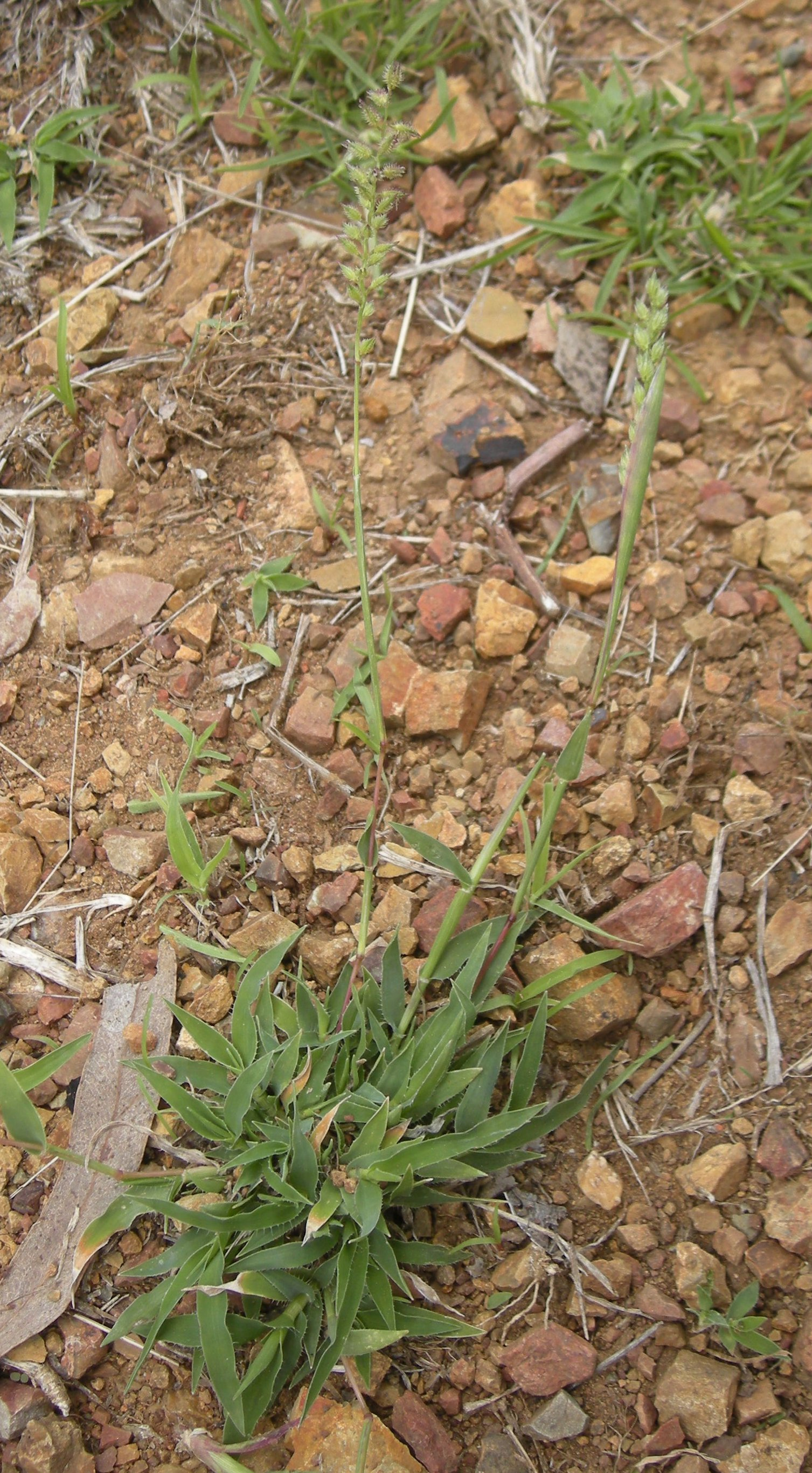
- Tragus australianus

Scientific classification
- Kingdom: Plantae
- Clade: Tracheophytes
- Clade: Angiosperms
- Clade: Monocots
- Clade: Commelinids
- Order: Poales
- Family: Poaceae
- Subfamily: Chloridoideae
- Tribe: Cynodonteae
- Subtribe: Traginae
- Genus: Tragus; Haller 1768 not Panz. 1813

Type species
- Tragus racemosus (L.) All.

Synonyms
- Echisachys Neck.; Echinanthus Cerv.; Lappago Schreb.; Nazia Adans.

= Tragus (plant) =

Genus of grasses

Tragus, commonly called bur gras, burr grass or carrot-seed grass, is a genus of plants in the grass family. It is native to Africa, Australia, and Eurasia with several species on islands in the Atlantic, Indian, and Pacific Oceans plus one species in Argentina.

Plants are monoecious, stoloniferous, and either annual or perennial depending on the species. The genus has been introduced in subtropical and tropical areas around the world as weeds of disturbed areas. The culms (stems) are ascending or low and mat forming, glabrous, and circular in cross-section. Blades are flat or folded and linear, ligules membraneous and trichomatous. Flowers are born in narrow panicles; the primary branches are spirally arranged, each possessing 2-5 spikelets; each of these spikelets bears a single floret. Each floret has 3 stamens, the anthers of which are pale yellow. The caryopses (grains) are elliptical and golden-brown.

Four species of Tragus have been introduced to North America: T. australianus, T. berteronianus, T. heptaneuron, and T. racemosus. The natural chromosome count is 2n = 20 in T. berteronianus, and 2n = 40 in T. racemosus. Tragus species utilize C_{4} photosynthesis. They prevent erosion, but make for poor grazing and in larger numbers indicate overgrazing.

== Species ==
Seven species are accepted.

- Tragus andicola M.A.Zapater & Sulekic – Argentina (Catamarca, Jujuy, Salta, Tucuman)
- Tragus australianus S.T.Blake – Australia, New Caledonia
- Tragus berteronianus Schult. – Africa, Arabian Peninsula, Iran, Afghanistan, Pakistan, China; introduced in North America, West Indies, South America
- Tragus heptaneuron Clayton – Somalia, Kenya, Tanzania
- Tragus koelerioides Asch. – Zimbabwe, Namibia, Botswana, Lesotho, South Africa
- Tragus mongolorum Ohwi – Mongolia, China, Indian subcontinent, Indochina, Madagascar, Mauritius, Réunion
- Tragus racemosus (L.) All. – Africa + Eurasia from France and Canary Islands to South Africa to Kazakhstan

formerly included

several species have been placed in other genera – Brachypodium, Bromus, Festuca, Leptothrium, Lolium, Pseudechinolaena, etc.

- Tragus alienus - Pseudechinolaena polystachya
- Tragus elatior - Lolium arundinaceum
- Tragus gracilis - Brachypodium sylvaticum
- Tragus latipes - Leptothrium senegalense
- Tragus loliaceus - Lolium arundinaceum
- Tragus pedunculatus – Orthacanthus pedunculatus
- Tragus pinnatus - Brachypodium pinnatum
- Tragus pratensis - Lolium pratense
- Tragus pumilus - Festuca quadriflora
- Tragus senegalensis - Leptothrium senegalense
- Tragus unioloides - Bromus catharticus
- Tragus varius - Festuca varia
