= Carex subumbellata =

Scientific classification
- Kingdom: Plantae
- Clade: Tracheophytes
- Clade: Angiosperms
- Clade: Monocots
- Clade: Commelinids
- Order: Poales
- Family: Cyperaceae
- Genus: Carex
- Species: C. subumbellata

Binomial name
- Carex subumbellata Meinsh.

Species of grass-like plant

Carex subumbellata, also known as subumbellate sedge, is a sedge that is native parts of eastern Asia including parts of Japan, Korea and the islands of far eastern Russia.

== See also ==
- List of Carex species
