= Carex arcatica =

Scientific classification
- Kingdom: Plantae
- Clade: Tracheophytes
- Clade: Angiosperms
- Clade: Monocots
- Clade: Commelinids
- Order: Poales
- Family: Cyperaceae
- Genus: Carex
- Species: C. arcatica

Binomial name
- Carex arcatica Meinsh.

Species of grass-like plant

Carex arcatica is a sedge that is native parts of central and eastern Asia including northern parts of China, Mongolia, Tajikistan, Uzbekistan and Kyrgyzstan.

== See also ==
- List of Carex species
