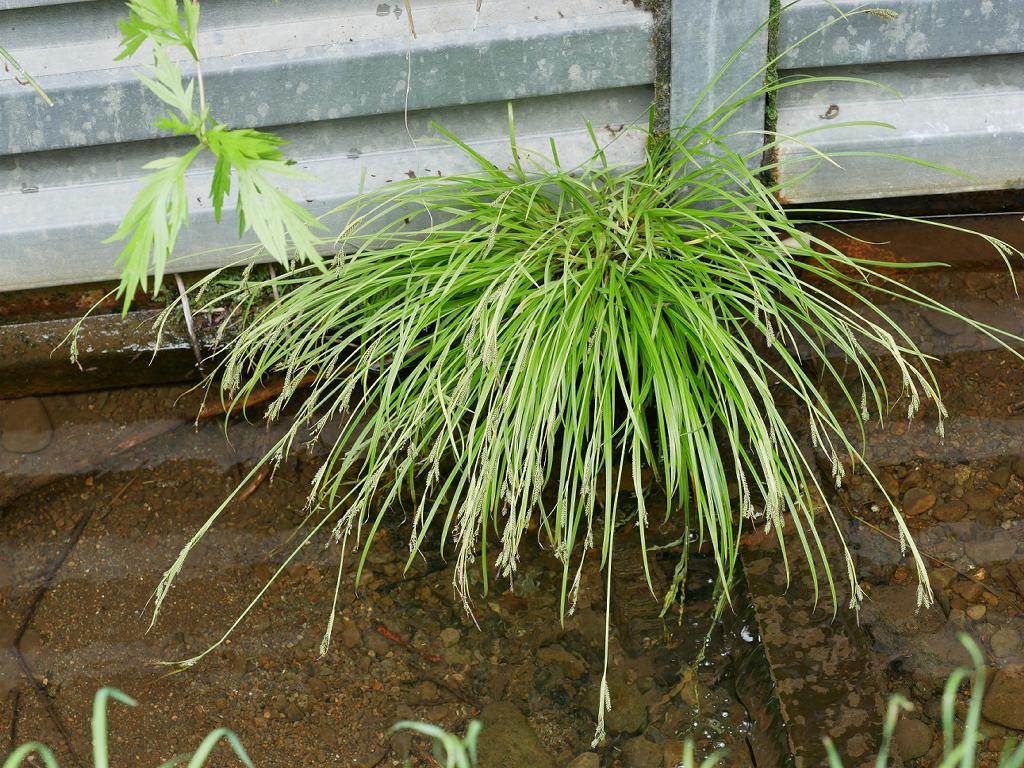

Scientific classification
- Kingdom: Plantae
- Clade: Tracheophytes
- Clade: Angiosperms
- Clade: Monocots
- Clade: Commelinids
- Order: Poales
- Family: Cyperaceae
- Genus: Carex
- Species: C. augustinowiczii

Binomial name
- Carex augustinowiczii Meinsh.

= Carex augustinowiczii =

Species of grass-like plant

Carex augustinowiczii, also known as Augustinowicz's sedge, is a sedge that is native parts of eastern Asia including north eastern parts of China, Mongolia, Japan, Korea and far eastern parts of Russia including Primorye, Sakhalin and the Kuril Islands.

== See also ==
- List of Carex species
