= Carex glauciformis =

Scientific classification
- Kingdom: Plantae
- Clade: Tracheophytes
- Clade: Angiosperms
- Clade: Monocots
- Clade: Commelinids
- Order: Poales
- Family: Cyperaceae
- Genus: Carex
- Species: C. glauciformis

Binomial name
- Carex glauciformis Meinsh.

Species of grass-like plant

Carex glauciformis, also known as pseudo-glaucous sedge, is a sedge that is native parts of eastern Asia including north eastern parts of China, Mongolia, Korea and far eastern parts of Russia including Primorye, Siberia and Amur.

== See also ==
- List of Carex species
