= Carex mandshurica =

Scientific classification
- Kingdom: Plantae
- Clade: Tracheophytes
- Clade: Angiosperms
- Clade: Monocots
- Clade: Commelinids
- Order: Poales
- Family: Cyperaceae
- Genus: Carex
- Species: C. mandshurica

Binomial name
- Carex mandshurica Meinsh.

Species of grass-like plant

Carex mandshurica, the Manchurian sedge, is a species of sedge that is native to parts of eastern Asia including northeastern China, the Korean Peninsula, and far southeastern parts of Russia.

== See also ==
- List of Carex species
