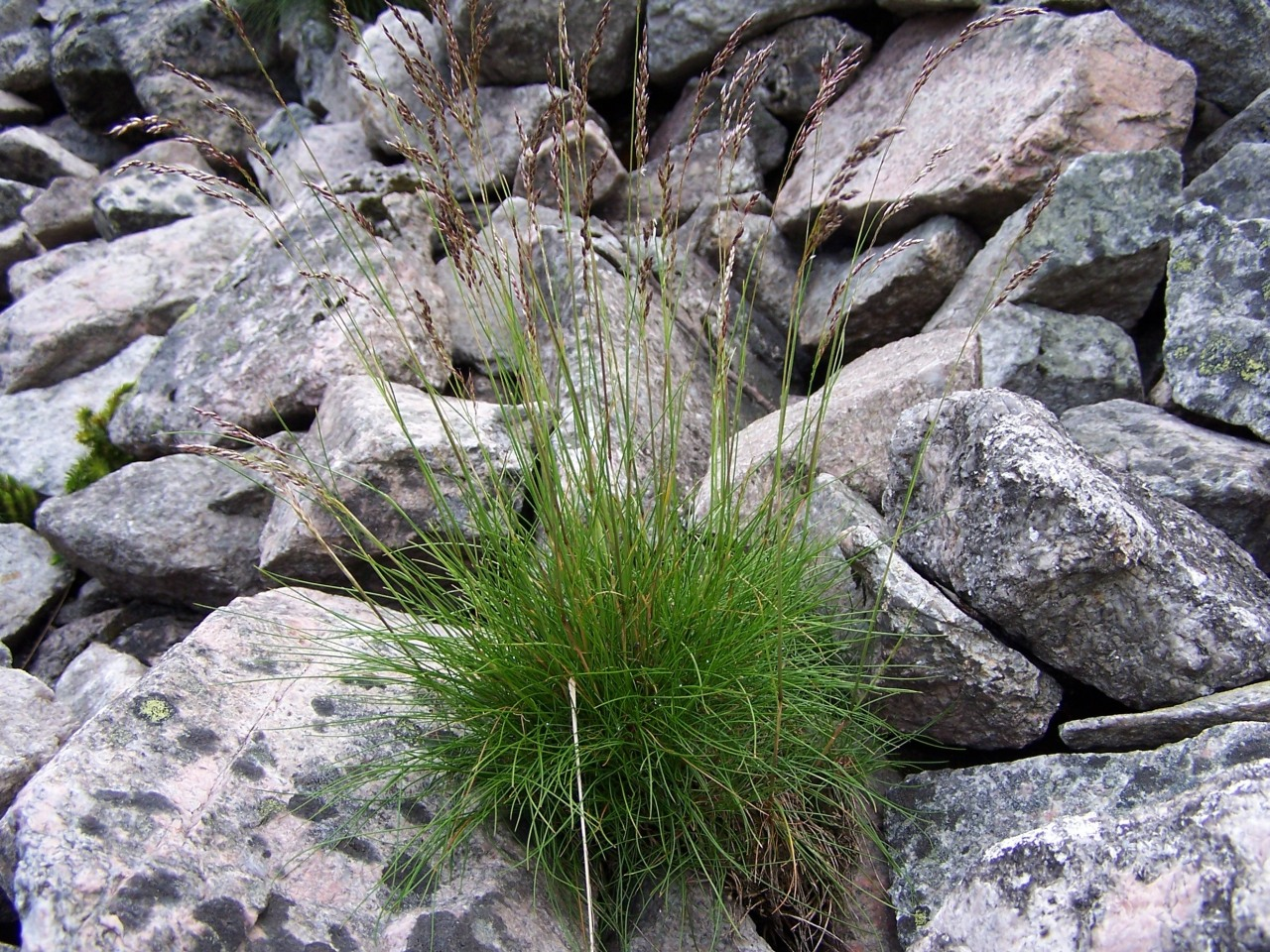

Scientific classification
- Kingdom: Plantae
- Clade: Tracheophytes
- Clade: Angiosperms
- Clade: Monocots
- Clade: Commelinids
- Order: Poales
- Family: Poaceae
- Subfamily: Pooideae
- Genus: Festuca
- Species: F. varia

Binomial name
- Festuca varia Haenke

Synonyms
- List: Festuca pumila subsp. varia (Haenke) Litard.; Festuca pumila var. varia (Haenke) Bolzon; Schedonorus varius (Haenke) P.Beauv.; Tragus varius (Haenke) B.D.Jacks.; Festuca alpina Host; Festuca bellardii Schott ex Steud.; Festuca brachystachys (Hack.) K.Richt.; Festuca karabaghensis Mussajev; Festuca lagascae Steud.; Festuca laxa Schleich. ex Steud.; Festuca lubrica Lapeyr.; Festuca minor Schur; Festuca picta J.F.Gmel.; Festuca spadicea Geners. ex Roem. & Schult.; Festuca spadicea Geners.; Festuca sudetica Tausch ex Steud.; Festuca varia subsp. brachystachys (Hack.) Hegi; Festuca varia var. brachystachys Hack.; Festuca varia var. caucasica St.-Yves; Festuca varia var. croatica Hack.; Festuca varia var. firmior Belli & Hack.; Festuca varia subvar. pallidula Hack.; Festuca varia subsp. woronowii (Hack.) Tzvelev; Festuca varia var. woronowii (Hack.) St.-Yves; Festuca versicolor subsp. brachystachys (Hack.) Markgr.-Dann.; Festuca versicolor subsp. pallidula (Hack.) Markgr.-Dann.; Festuca woronowii Hack.; Festuca woronowii subsp. argaea Markgr.-Dann.; Festuca woronowii subsp. caucasica (St.-Yves) E.B.Alexeev; Festuca woronowii subsp. turcica Markgr.-Dann.

= Festuca varia =

Species of grass

Festuca varia is a species of grass in the family Poaceae. The species was first published in 1789. This species is native to the European mountains, and Caucasus.

== Habitat ==
Festuca varia is perennial and mainly grows in temperate biomes.
