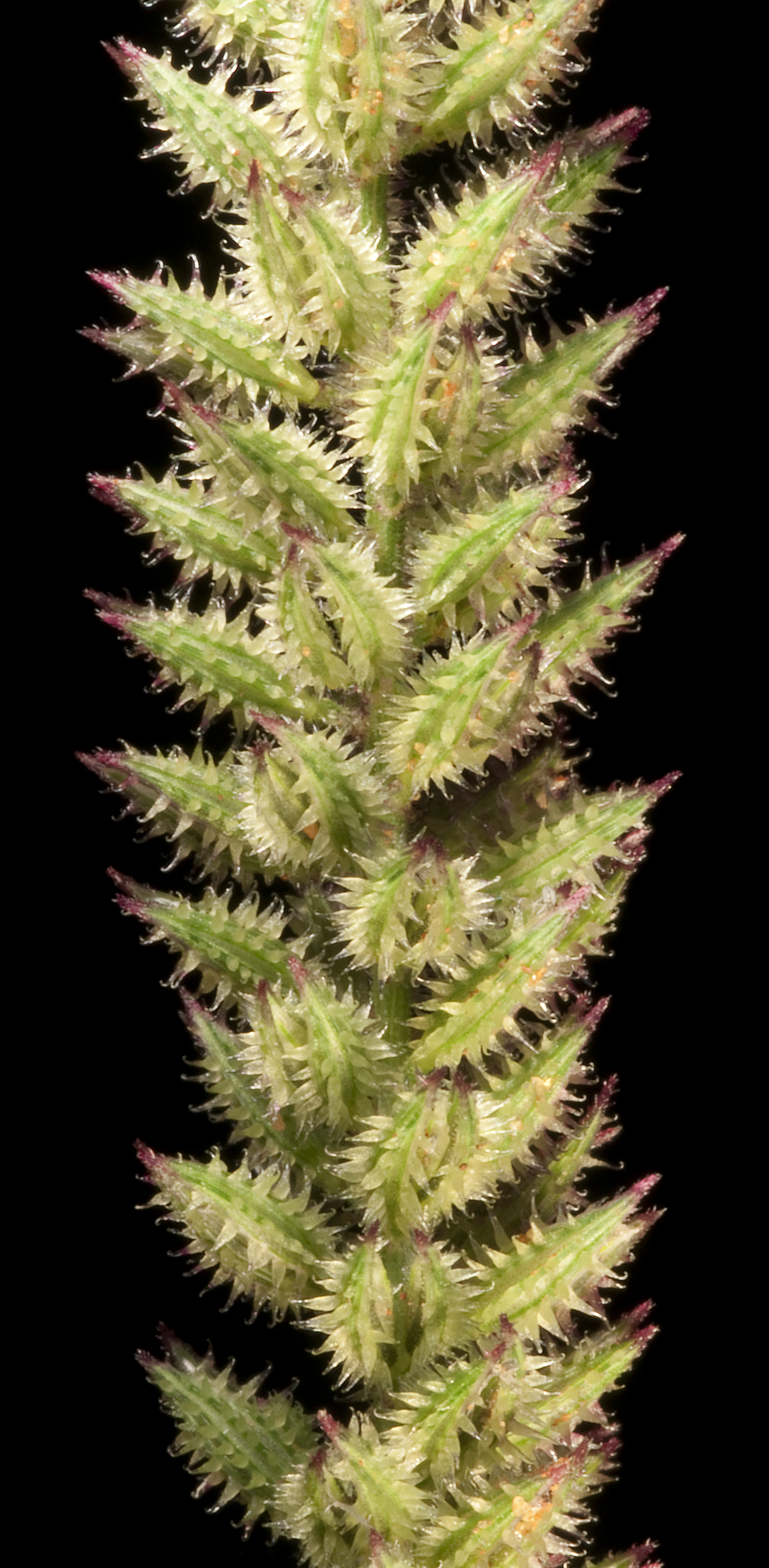

Scientific classification
- Kingdom: Plantae
- Clade: Tracheophytes
- Clade: Angiosperms
- Clade: Monocots
- Clade: Commelinids
- Order: Poales
- Family: Poaceae
- Subfamily: Chloridoideae
- Genus: Tragus
- Species: T. australianus

Binomial name
- Tragus australianus S.T.Blake

= Tragus australianus =

Species of grass

Tragus australianus, common names (in Australia) Burr grass, Small burrgrass, and Tickgrass, is a summer ephemeral grass (in the Poaceae family), first described by Stanley Thatcher Blake in 1941. It flowers in response to rain. Its native range is mainland Australia, where it is found in arid and semi-arid areas.
