= Schwanheim (Frankfurt am Main) =

- Quarter of Frankfurt am Main
- Coat of arms

- Location of Schwanheim (red) and the Ortsbezirk West (light red) within Frankfurt am Main
- Interactive map of Schwanheim
- Location within Germany Location within Hesse
- Coordinates: 50°05′13″N 08°34′55″E
- Country: Germany
- State: Hesse
- Admin. region: Darmstadt
- District: Urban district
- City: Frankfurt am Main

Area
  - Total: 17.727 km^{2} (6.844 sq mi)

Population (2020-12-31)
  - Total: 20,576
  - Density: 1,160.7/km^{2} (3,006.2/sq mi)
- Time zone: UTC+01:00 (CET)
  - Summer (DST): UTC+02:00 (CEST)
- Postal codes: 60528, 60529
- Dialling codes: 069
- Vehicle registration: F
- Website: www.schwanheim.de

Schwanheim (German pronunciation: [ˈʃvaːnhaɪm]) is a quarter of Frankfurt am Main, Germany. It is part of the Ortsbezirk West and is subdivided into the Stadtbezirke Schwanheim, Goldstein-Ost and Goldstein-West.

== History ==
=== Medieval Period — Early Modern Period ===
Schwanheim was evangelized during the early Christianization period by Irish-Scottish wandering monks. The Franconian apostle Kilian is said to have rested and preached at a flood-free ridge in the Schwanheimer Unterfeld around the year 680. The old parish church of St. Martin im Feld, which was mentioned in a document from 880, was one of the few churches on the right bank of the Rhine at the time. The church's catchment area presumably extended beyond the boundaries of the long-stretched original district of Schwanheim, which went in the west from the Mönchhof near Raunheim via Klaraberg, Kelsterbach, the Goldstein, Niederrad, and Sachsenhausen to Oberrad. However, the decline of the church began 50 years before Luther posted his theses in Wittenberg. From 1468, the people of Schwanheim celebrated their church consecration festival to the patron Saint Mauritius on the Sunday in Mauritius (September 22). The final end of the Martinskirche was sealed with the effects of the Reformation of 1517, which also had an impact in the local Maingau. The branch chapel of St. Mauritius with a cemetery near the old village of Schwanheim was raised to the status of a parish church and expanded between 1557 and 1562. The Martinskirche in the field was without function and fell into disrepair. It served as a quarry during the Thirty Years' War, and when the "new" church was built in the village a good hundred years later (1687), 72 wagons of stone were obtained from this ruin for the foundations of this third Schwanheim church building. From now on, Schwanheim remained true to the name Mauritius.

=== 19th Century — 21st Century ===
In the 19th century, Schwanheim experienced slow development from a farming village to a workers' settlement, influenced by the chemical industry in nearby areas and economic ties with Frankfurt. The village received a closer connection to the Frankfurter Waldbahn in 1889, making the previous halt on the Hessian Ludwigsbahn almost obsolete. The medical care in the village was also improved at the instigation of local seniors and the Catholic parish. Schwanheim became part of Prussia in 1866 after the war, along with the Nassau territory and Frankfurt.

In the 20th century, the construction of the first main bridge between Schwanheim and Griesheim began in 1905, and it was opened in 1907. French troops occupied a bridgehead on the right bank of the Rhine in 1918, including Schwanheim. The Allied occupation of the Rhineland lasted until 1930. Schwanheim was incorporated into the Frankfurt city area in 1928, with a population of 5,850 inhabitants and 1,793 hectares.

Construction of the Goldstein settlement began in the spring of 1932, and the Griesheim barrage was built between 1929 and 1932 as a replacement for two older needle weirs. The Schwanheim Bridge was blown up by German Wehrmacht engineers on March 26, 1945, shortly before US troops marched in. A temporary bridge was erected in 1947 and demolished in 1963 after the new Schwanheimer bridge was inaugurated. In 2005, the district celebrated its 1125th anniversary. On January 1, 2019, district 53 3 Goldstein-Ost was assigned to the Niederrad district and renamed 37 3 Niederrad-West, with the border between Schwanheim and Niederrad now running along the A5.
