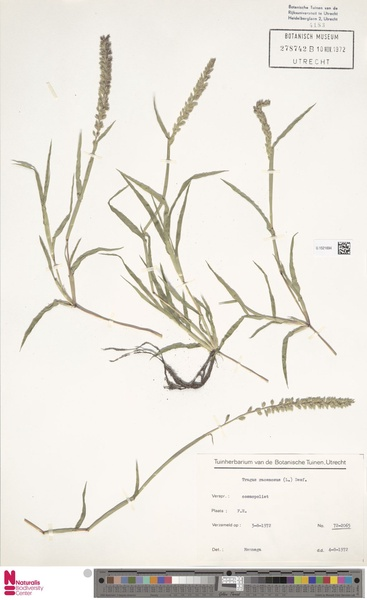
- Preserved specimen of Tragus racemosus

Scientific classification
- Kingdom: Plantae
- Clade: Tracheophytes
- Clade: Angiosperms
- Clade: Monocots
- Clade: Commelinids
- Order: Poales
- Family: Poaceae
- Subfamily: Chloridoideae
- Genus: Tragus
- Species: T. racemosus

Binomial name
- Tragus racemosus (L.) All.

= Tragus racemosus =

Species of grass

Tragus racemosus, commonly referred to as stalked bur grass, European bur grass, or large carrot seed grass, is a species of grass native to Europe. It is often confused with a similar plant of the same genus, Tragus berteronianus. It is a monocot and is considered a weed in many countries and is a relatively uncommon seed contaminant.

== Description ==
Mature Tragus racemosus plants are typically 0.5-1.5 ft. (15.24-45.72 cm) tall with clustered stems.

Leaves are mostly cauline and arranged in a distichous manner. They are typically 1.5-4 mm long and do not have auricles. There is a distinct separation between the leaf blade and the leaf sheath.

Leaf blades are linear and filiform with parallel venation. They are typically 0.5-5.5 cm long and 1.5-4mm wide. The surface of the leaf is mostly glabrous with ligules present.

Branches are typically 2.1-4.8 mm long, with 2-5 spikelets paired at rachis nodes. Flowers can be found attached to branches with racemouse inflorescence. They contain 3 yellow anthers between 0.6-0.8 mm and 2 white stigmas. Proximal spikelets are 3.8-6.6 mm, second spikelets are 2.3-6.6 mm, and the third and fourth spikelets are 0.8-4.2 mm. Each spikelet contains one floret with smooth lemma. Each lemma contains 3 veins.

Unlike other members of the Tragus genus who have a chromosome count of 2n=20, Tragus racemosus has a chromosome count of 2n=40.

Tragus racemosus, along with other members in the Tragus species, utilizes C_{4} photosynthesis.

== Distribution and habitat ==
Tragus racemosus is native to Europe, Asia, and Africa. It has been specifically identified in Austria, Belgium, Bulgaria, Czechia, Germany, Hungary, Slovakia, Spain, and the United Kingdom.

Tragus racemosus is an introduced species to North and South America and has been found in established populations in Arizona where it grows in sandy soil. It can occasionally be found in New England. Accounts of Tragus racemosus on the Western coast of the United States have been in manmade or disturbed habitats such as dump sites or construction sites and have not resulted in established populations. It has been reported in New Mexico and Texas, but these reports have since been contributed to confusion with a similar grass species of the same genus, Tragus berteronianus.

== Phenology ==
Tragus racemosus is an annual plant. As is common with other species that use C_{4} photosynthesis, it grows primarily in the hot and dry periods of the summer months. In the northern hemisphere, it has been reported to flower in August and October. It has also been reported to produce fruit in August and October. It appears to have leaves from late July through early November.

== Uses ==
Because Tragus racemosus is a grass, it can be used to reduce soil erosion in areas where it is native to.

Species of the Tragus genus, including Tragus racemosus, are not suitable grasses for grazing. If these plants are found in abundance, it could suggest overgrazing, in which the other grasses suitable for grazing are eaten, eliminating competition and allowing Tragus racemosus to grow in larger quantities.
