= Niederrad =

- Quarter of Frankfurt am Main
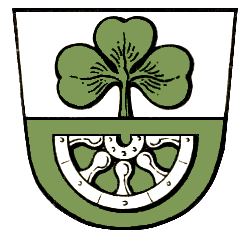
- Coat of arms

- Location of Niederrad (red) and the Ortsbezirk Süd (light red) within Frankfurt am Main
- Interactive map of Niederrad
- Location within Germany Location within Hesse
- Coordinates: 50°05′18″N 08°38′37″E
- Country: Germany
- State: Hesse
- Admin. region: Darmstadt
- District: Urban district
- City: Frankfurt am Main

Area
  - Total: 2.894 km^{2} (1.117 sq mi)

Population (2020-12-31)
  - Total: 27,043
  - Density: 9,345/km^{2} (24,200/sq mi)
- Time zone: UTC+01:00 (CET)
  - Summer (DST): UTC+02:00 (CEST)
- Postal codes: 60528
- Dialling codes: 069
- Vehicle registration: F
- Website: www.niederrad.de

Niederrad (German pronunciation: [ˈniːdɐˌʁaːt]) is a quarter of Frankfurt am Main, Germany. It is part of the Ortsbezirk Süd and is subdivided into the Stadtbezirke Niederrad-Nord, Niederrad-Süd and the new Niederrad-West.

== Geography ==
Niederrad is bordered in the north by the River Main, in the west by the A5 Autobahn, in the south by the Main Railway and Flughafenstraße, and in the east by the former racecourse, Kennedyallee and the Main-Neckar Railway.

Niederrad is the site of the western part of the University Hospital Frankfurt. Until 2018, the Bürostadt Niederrad was technically part of the Schwanheim district, but Niederrad now covers the entire Bürostadt, which has been renamed the Lyoner Quartier. The former Niederrad Racecourse – now home to a park and the academy of the German Football Association – is located administratively in the district of Sachsenhausen.

== History ==
The district is mainly designated as residential area, although it has a large office park (Bürostadt) in its western half. It includes the early social housing area of Bruchfeldstraße which was planned by the urban planners in the 1920s under the direction of Ernst May, the Adolf-Miersch housing area (1957/58) and the high-rise Mainfeld residential area (begun in 1963, built mainly during the early 1970s).

In 1151 Niederrad was mentioned for the first time in a document, referring to it simply as "Rode" (literally: "the clearing") in the imperial forest between Sachsenhausen and Schwanheim.

In 1193 the Sandhof, a (small) royal moated castle, is mentioned for the first time.

In 1221 the Sandhof passes into the possession of the Teutonic Order (until 1809).

In 1552 Niederrad and the Sandhof are put to the torch by Markgrave Alcibiades of Brandenburg.

In 1616, another fire almost completely burns Niederrad to the ground.

In 1726 the first Protestant church is built (now: Paul-Gerhard-Gemeinde).

Around 1750 the Sandhof gets a baroque architectural makeover.

Between 1761 and 74 the Frauenhof is built. The building is first used for a cotton printing factory by the merchant Johann Friedrich Müller.

Around 1850 Niederrad's population increases to 2,000 people.

In 1866 Niederrad, like Frankfurt am Main, is annexed by Prussia, as a result of the Austro-Prussian War.

In 1871 Niederrad's first catholic church is built.

In 1887 the Sandhof, who came into possession of the city government in 1884, is turned into a (part of) a hospital that would later become the hospital of the Frankfurt University.

On July 1 of 1900 Niederrad is officially integrated into the city of Frankfurt. (Population at the time: 8,800 people.) Before, it was only part of the surrounding district.

In 1930 Niederrad reaches a population of 14,000 people. At the same time the psychiatric clinic is built by Ernst May and Professor Elsässer.

In 1932/33 a new catholic church is built.

In 1944 the Sandhof is destroyed by allied bombardment. Other parts of Niederrad are also severely damaged.

In 1950 Niederrad's population reaches 18,000 people.

As of 2019, Niederrad had a population of 26,488 people.

== Public Transportation ==
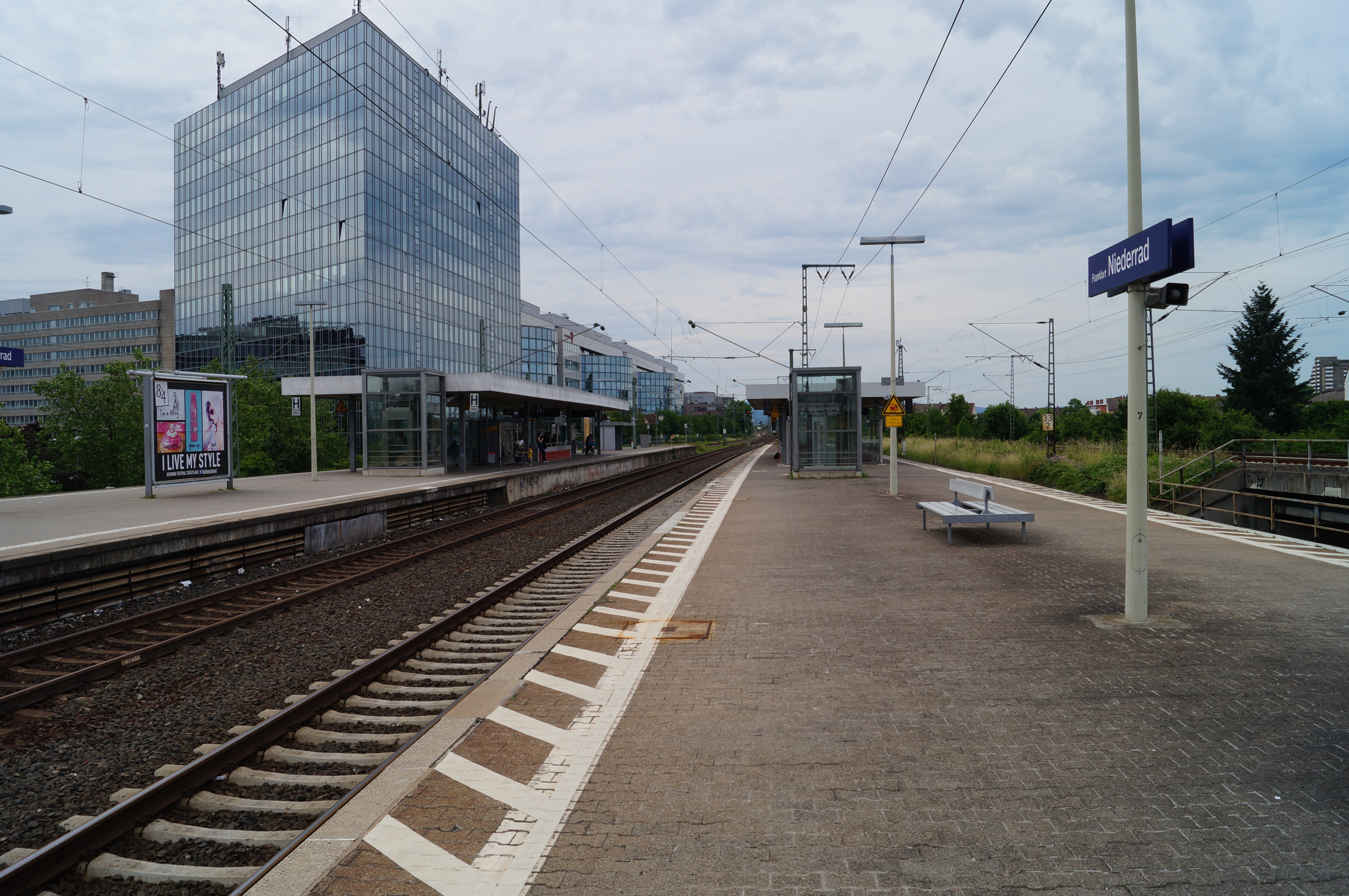
Frankfurt-Niederrad station

Niederrad had multiple bus, train, and tram connections such as:

- Train lines
  - S7, S8 and S9
- Tram lines
  - 12, 15, 19, 20 and 21
- Bus lines
  - 61, 71, 78, 79, 80, 84 and N12

== Gallery ==
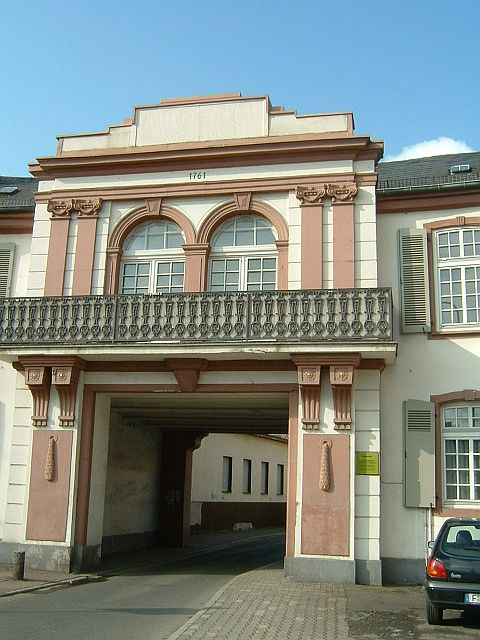
Frauenhof, a baroque building in Niederrad from 1761

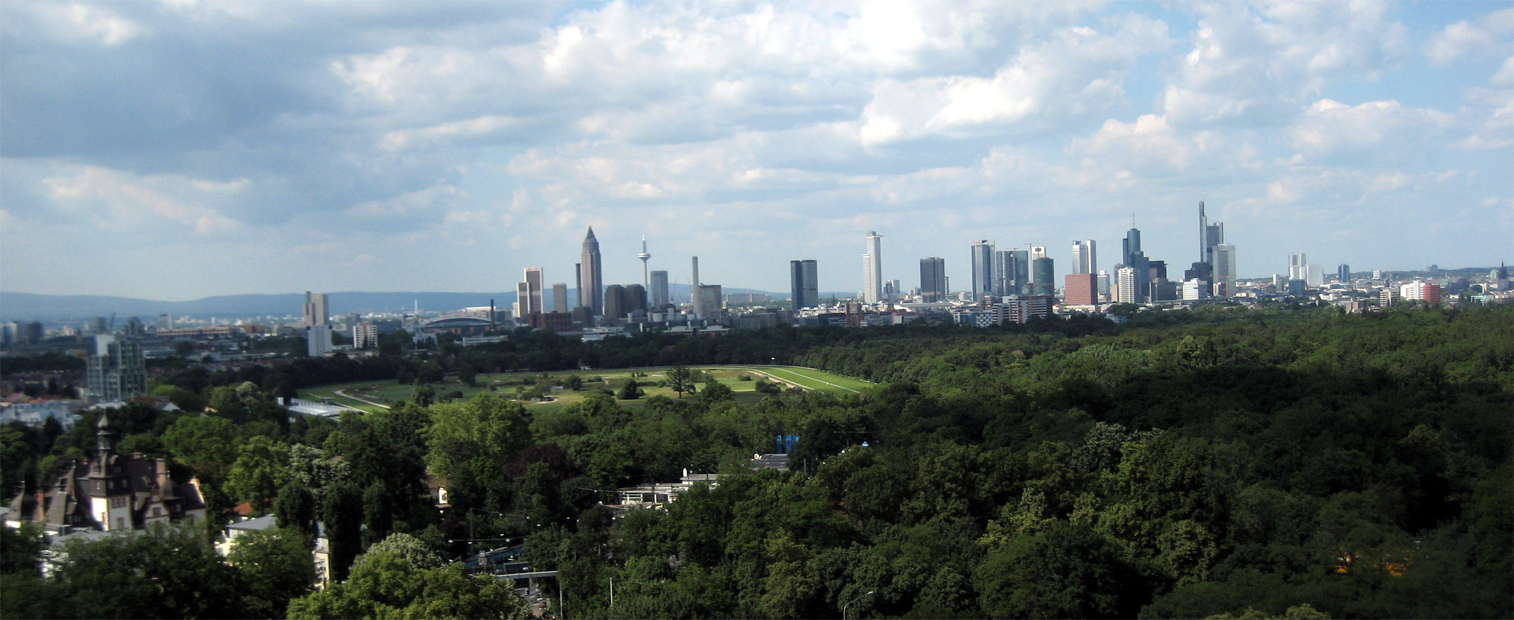
Niederrad racecourse

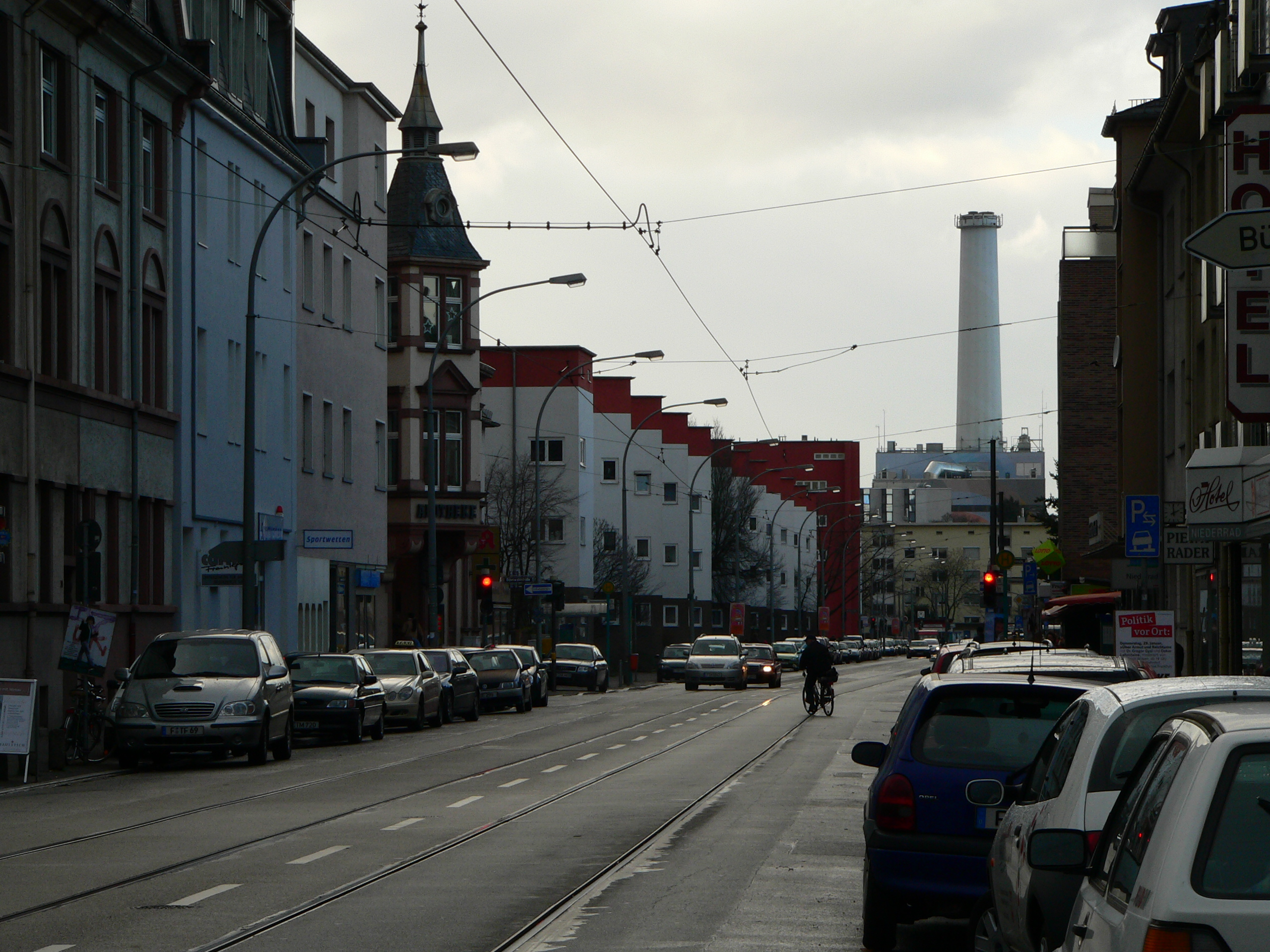
Bruchfeldstraße

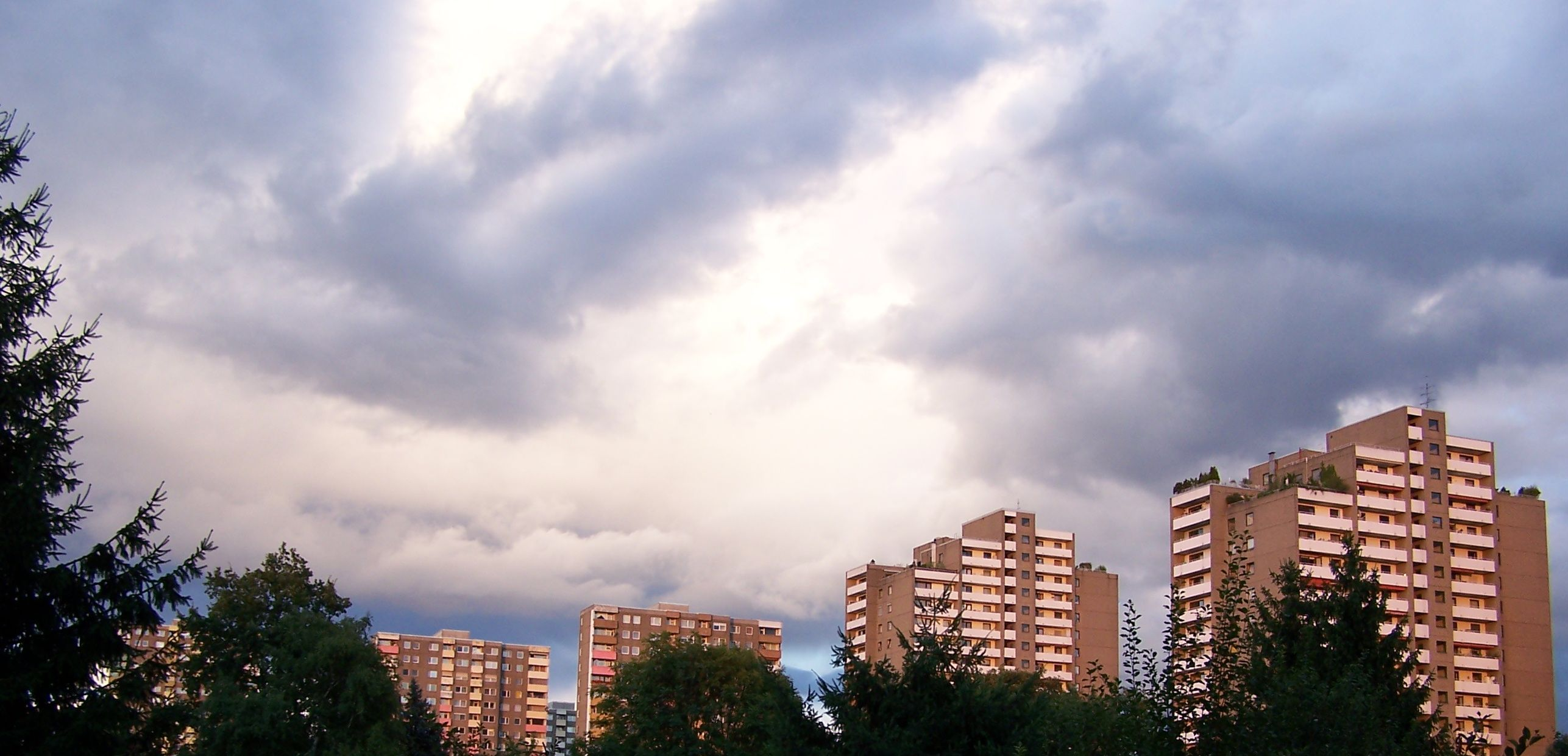
Mainfeld, a residential area

== The fossil plant site of Pliocene age in Niederrad ==
Fossil plant remains named in scientific literature as The Pliocene flora of Frankfurt am Main in Germany, had been discovered in the excavation pit of the Höchst lock in 1884, a sandy clay layer, many more fossil seeds, fruits and leaves were uncovered in 1885 during the construction of the Frankfurt water clarifier in Niederrad.
