= Antoine Magnin =

French physician and botanist

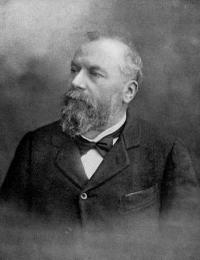
Antoine Magnin

Antoine Magnin (15 February 1848, Trévoux – 15 April 1926, Beynost) was a French physician and botanist.

== Biography ==
He served as an interne at the Hôpitaux de Lyon, later becoming a professor of botany to the medical faculty at Lyon. From 1881 to 1884, he was director of the Jardin botanique de Lyon, located in the Parc de la Tête d'Or. He later relocated to Besançon, where he was named dean at the faculty of sciences.

From 1873, he was a member of the Société d'études scientifiques de Lyon and the Société linnéenne de Lyon. In 1908 he was named president of the Société botanique de France.

He was the author of hundreds of scientific articles, 64 of them being published in the Annales de la Société Botanique de Lyon. The lichenized fungi genus Magninia (synonym Lecanora, family Lecanoraceae) in named in his honor.

== Selected works ==
- Les lichens utiles, 1877 – Useful lichens.
- Les bactéries, 1878; translated into English by George Miller Sternberg (1838-1915) as The Bacteria (1880).
- Recherches sur la géographie botanique du Lyonnais, 1879 – Research on the botanical geography of Lyonnais.
- Claret de La Tourrette, sa vie, ses travaux, ses recherches sur les lichens du Lyonnais, d'après ses ouvrages et les notes inédites de son herbier, 1885 – Marc Antoine Louis Claret de La Tourrette, his life, his work, his research of lichens from Lyonnais, etc.
- Observations sur la flore du Jura et du Lyonnais, 1894 – Observations on the flora of Jura and Lyonnais.
- Monographies botaniques de 74 lacs jurassiens : suivies de considération générales sur la végétation lacustre, 1904 – Botanical monograph on 74 Jura lakes, etc.
- Charles Nodier, naturaliste : ses oeuvres d'histoire naturelle, 1911 – Charles Nodier, naturalist; his works in natural history.
- Les Lortet, botanistes lyonnais; particulièrement Clémence, Pierre et Louis Lortet et le botaniste Roffavier, 1913 – The Lortets, Lyon botanists; especially Clémence, Pierre and Louis Lortet and the botanist Georges Roffavier.
