= Mary Frances Linder Fitzpatrick =

American botanist

- Born: September 1861
- Died: April 24, 1955 (aged 93)
- Other names
- Education: State University of Iowa
- Scientific career
- Fields: Botany
- Workplaces: Graceland College
- Thesis: A Brief Description of Nine Species of Hepaticae Found in the Vicinity of Iowa City (1886)

Signature
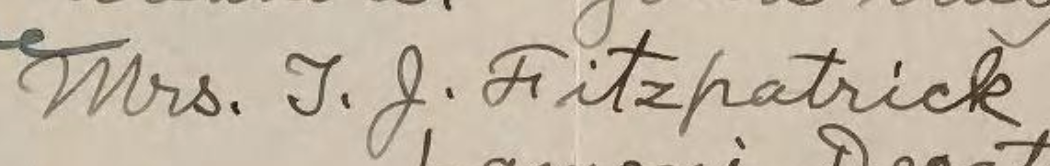

Mary Frances Linder Fitzpatrick (1861–1955) was an American botanist.

== Early life and education ==
Mary Frances Linder was born in September 1861, one of ten children of Anton and Katherine Linder. She attended public school in Iowa City. She graduated from the State University of Iowa and wrote one of the university's first bachelor's theses, "A Brief Description of Nine Species of Hepaticae Found in the Vicinity of Iowa City" in 1886. Per botanist Diana Horton, this was likely done under the guidance of Prof. Thomas MacBride. In addition to being a student, she was employed as a botany assistant at the University of Iowa in 1889 and 1890. Ms. Linder was listed as a botany instructor in the Pharmaceutical Department and she did some post-graduate work in Bonn, Germany.

== Marriage ==
Linder married Thomas Jefferson Fitzpatrick on August 26, 1896, in Iowa City, Iowa. Thomas was a native of Centerville, Iowa, and earned his bachelor's degree from the State University of Iowa in 1893 and his master's degree in 1895. The duo began their married life teaching at Graceland College in Lamoni, Iowa.

== Employment and botany ==
Now going by her married name, Fitzpatrick taught German and French from 1897 to 1900 and again from 1908 to 1912 at Graceland. Her spouse taught several science courses, was the college's first librarian, and performed a number of administrative duties. During their tenure at Graceland the Fitzpatricks assembled an extensive herbarium (˜20,000 specimens) of Iowa's flowering plants, but the family moved to Nebraska in 1913, when T.J. accepted a professorship at Cotner College in Lincoln. He then moved on to a position as botany professor and curator of the herbarium at the University of Nebraska in 1918. Thomas remained at the University of Nebraska, until his retirement in 1949.

Mary Frances and Thomas had at least a passing interest in paleontology, but the majority of their research was plant oriented. They collaborated on several publications dealing with Iowa's flora.

== Collecting and selling books ==
The Fitzpatricks had a sideline pursuit as book collectors and sellers. Though Thomas may have been the primary motivator in that arena, Fitzpatrick was involved in the endeavor as evidenced by the fact that "Library of T. J. Fitzpatrick; M. F. L. Fitzpatrick" was the bookplate affixed to volumes in their collection.

In February 1953 Robert Vosper and antiquarian bookseller Frank Glenn traveled to Lincoln, Nebraska, to evaluate the Fitzpatrick Library that Glenn had purchased. Upon entering the Fitzpatricks' former home Glenn discovered the house to be completely full of books that were "stacked under tables, piled up on beds, heaped in bundles on both sides of the stairways, pressed three and four deep in bookcases and onto ceiling-height shelving that lined every room and all hallways." No complete inventory was ever made and one inspector estimated that "there might be twenty-five tons of books in each of the larger rooms and ninety tons all told" in the Fitzpatrick house.

== Children and final years ==
The Fitzpatricks had three children: Frederick, Lilian, and Dethen. Frederick earned a degree from the University of Iowa and ultimately retained a professorship in natural science at Columbia University in New York. Lilian earned her M.A. in 1923 from the University of Nebraska and subsequently began a doctoral program at Cornell University. She contracted tuberculosis during her Ph.D. program and perished in 1935 prior to completing her research. Following his father's death in 1952, Frederick helped resettle his mother with family members in Iowa City until her death on April 24, 1955.
