= Lova Marline =

Madagascan tropical ecologist

- Other name: Lovanomenjanahary Marline
- Education: University of Cape Town
- Known for: bryophytes of Madagascar
- Scientific career
- Thesis: Diversity and biogeography of Madagascan bryophytes with an analysis of taxic and functional diversity along an elevational gradient in Marojejy National Park (2018)
- Doctoral advisors: Terry A.J. Hedderson, Claudine Ah-Peng
- Author abbrev. (botany): Marline

Lova Marline is a tropical ecologist, especially of taxonomy and ecology of tropical bryophytes in Madagascar. She compiled the first check-list of bryophytes in Madagasgar.

== Early life and education ==
Lova Marline (also known as Lovanomenjanahary Marline) was born in Madagascar. She studied at University of Antananarivo for her B.Sc. and master's degrees, specialising in botany and ecology. In 2018 she completed her doctorate at University of Cape Town on the bryophytes of Madagascar.

== Career ==
In 2014 she was a Green Talent awardee of the German Federal Ministry of Education and Research. Following short post-doctoral fellowships in South Africa and Germany, Marline joined the Kew Madagascar Conservation Centre at Royal Botanic Gardens, Kew. She compiled the first check-list of the bryophytes of Madagascar to test for changes in their diversity or distribution and for planning conservation.

She was involved in an international collaboration to monitor and manage air pollution in Madagascar. As part of this she was attached to Association Vahatra in Antananarivo, the capital of Madagascar while based at the Kew Madagascar Conservation Centre on Madagascar. In 2025 Marline was appointed as a postdoctoral research associate in the Farlow Herbarium of Cryptogamic Botany at Harvard University, continuing her research on bryophyte biogeography using herbarium specimens.

== Publications ==
Her scientific publications include:

Alexandre Antonelli et al. (74 authors) 2022. Madagascar’s extraordinary biodiversity: Evolution, distribution, and use. Science 378, eabf0869

Marline L., Ah-Peng C. & Hedderson T. 2020. Bryophyte diversity and range distributions along an elevational gradient in Marojejy, Madagascar. Biotropica 00: 1–12.

Ah-Peng C., Flores O., Wilding N., Bardat J., Marline L., Hedderson T. & Strasberg D. 2014. Functional diversity of subalpine bryophyte communities in an oceanic island (La Réunion). Arctic, Antarctic, and Alpine Research 46(4):841-851.

Lovanomenjanahary Marline, Roger Lala Andriamiarisoa, Jacques Bardat, Min Chuah-Petiot, Terry A.J. Hedderson, Catherine Reeb, Dominique Strasberg, Nicholas Wilding, Claudine Ah-Peng. 2012. Checklist of the Bryophytes of Madagascar Cryptogamie, Bryologie 33(3), 199–255

== Honours and awards ==
In 2023 Marline was awarded the Jennifer Ward Oppenheimer research grant for early-career scientists working on to African challenges.
