= Peter Michaelis =

German plant geneticist (1900–1975)

- Born: 28 May 1900; Munich, Germany
- Died: 3 August 1975 (aged 75); Cologne, Germany
- Education: Ludwig-Maximilians-Universität München (Ph.D. 1923)
- Known for: Inheritance and segregation of cytoplasmic mutations
- Father: Oskar Michaelis
- Scientific career
- Fields: Plant genetics
- Workplaces: University of Jena; University of Stuttgart; Kaiser Wilhelm Institute for Breeding Research, Müncheberg; Max Planck Institute for Plant Breeding Research, Cologne/Vogelsang
- Doctoral advisor: Karl von Goebel
- Author abbrev. (botany): Michaelis

Peter Michaelis (28 May 1900, Munich – 3 August 1975, Cologne) was a German plant geneticist who focused most of his research on cytoplasm inheritance and segregation. Most of his work was carried out during the period from the 1940s to 1970s at the Max Planck Institute for Plant Breeding Research in Cologne/Vogelsang, where he was a group leader.

== Education and career ==
Michaelis was born in Munich as the son of the portrait painter Oskar Michaelis. He studied at the Ludwig-Maximilians-Universität München where he received his PhD under the supervision of Karl von Goebel in 1923. He worked as an assistant to Otto Renner at the University of Jena after graduation. In 1927, Michaelis moved to Stuttgart to work for Richard Harder and started lecturing at the University of Stuttgart. In 1933, upon Harder's departure for the University of Göttingen, Michaelis was hired by Erwin Baur to join the Kaiser Wilhelm Institute for Breeding Research in Müncheberg/Mark and continued under the direction of Erwin's successor Wilhelm Rudorf. The institute was later renamed the Max Planck Institute for Plant Breeding Research, where Michaelis continued his research until his retirement in 1968.

== Botanical abbreviation ==
The botanical abbreviation Michaelis refers to Peter Michaelis.

== Research ==
Michaelis worked primarily on the inheritance and segregation of cytoplasmic mutations in Epilobium, a genus related to Oenothera. From 1955 to 1956, he calculated the statistical probability of the segregation of two different types of plastids under different conditions. With further research Michaelis concluded that segregation of a mutant plastid could be the only cause of the observed variegation in the species.

After this Michaelis examined thirty cases of plastid variegation where no mixed cells were found. He proposed that mutant and non-mutant plastids were still segregating in early mitotic divisions. He suggested two possible ways the plastid could influence one another: (1) The mutant plastid might manufacture a substance that damaged the normal plastids during the maturation process. (2) The normal plastid might manufacture a substance that would allow the mutant form to develop normally.

Theory predicted that the two types could be distinguished clearly by an examination of the distribution of mutant and normal cells. Michaelis found clear examples of both types of mutation in his material and published his work in 1956.

Michaelis firmly believed in complex unity in the cytoplasm, but he rejected simplistic notions such as the plasma gene or that the cause of cytoplasmic inheritance was solely due to plastids and mitochondria. His work contributed largely to the development and understanding of organelle inheritance in Epilobium and other plants with two or more chloroplasts per cell.

== Bibliography ==
- Michaelis, P (1951) Interactions between genes and cytoplasm in Epilobium. Cold Spring Harb Symp Quant Biol. 16:121-129.
- Michaelis, P (1954) Cytoplasmic inheritance in Epilobium and its theoretical significance. Adv Genet 6:288–402.
- Michaelis, P (1959) Cytoplasmic inheritance and the segregation of plasmagenes. X. International Congr. Genet. I. 375-385
- Michaelis, P (1966) The proof of cytoplasmic inheritance in Epilobium (a historical survey as an example for the necessary proceeding). Nucleus 9:1-16
- Michaelis, P (1971) The investigation of plasmone segregation by the pattern-analysis. Nucleus 10: 1-14
