= Paul Julius Menzel =

German physician and paleobotanist (1864–1927)

Paul Julius Menzel (27 April 1864 in Dresden – 2 April 1927) was a German physician and paleobotanist.

In 1889 he obtained his medical doctorate from the University of Greifswald, afterwards working as a physician in Hainitz Grosspostwitz (from 1889 to 1898). From 1898 onward, he lived and worked in Dresden.

Known for his close association with the Senckenberg museum; after his death, the museum bought a large part of his fossil plant collection — approximately 11,000 items from the Tertiary formation of northern Bohemia.

== Selected works ==
- Fossile koniferen aus der kreide-und braunkohlenformation Nordböhmens, 1908 – Fossil conifers from the chalk and lignite formations of northern Bohemia.
- Beitrag zur Flora der Niederrheineschen Braunkohlenformation, 1913 – Contribution to the flora of the Lower Rhine lignite formation.
- Beitrag Zur Kenntnis Der Tertiärflora Aus Dem Gebiete Des Vierwaldstätter Sees (with Ernst Baumberger) – Contribution to the knowledge of Tertiary flora from areas of Lake Lucerne.
- Über Pflanzenreste aus Basalttuffen des Kamerungebietes, 1920 – On plant residue from basaltic tuff of the Kamerun region.
