= Marie Prins =

South African botanist with special interest in southern African trees

Marie Jordaan
- Born: Marie Prins; 1948 (age 77–78)
- Education: University of Stellenbosch; University of Pretoria
- Known for: Botany, Spermatophytes, Gymnosporia, Celastraceae
- Scientific career
- Institutions: National Herbarium; South African National Biodiversity Institute

Marie Prins (born 1948, married name Marie Jordaan) is a South African botanist.

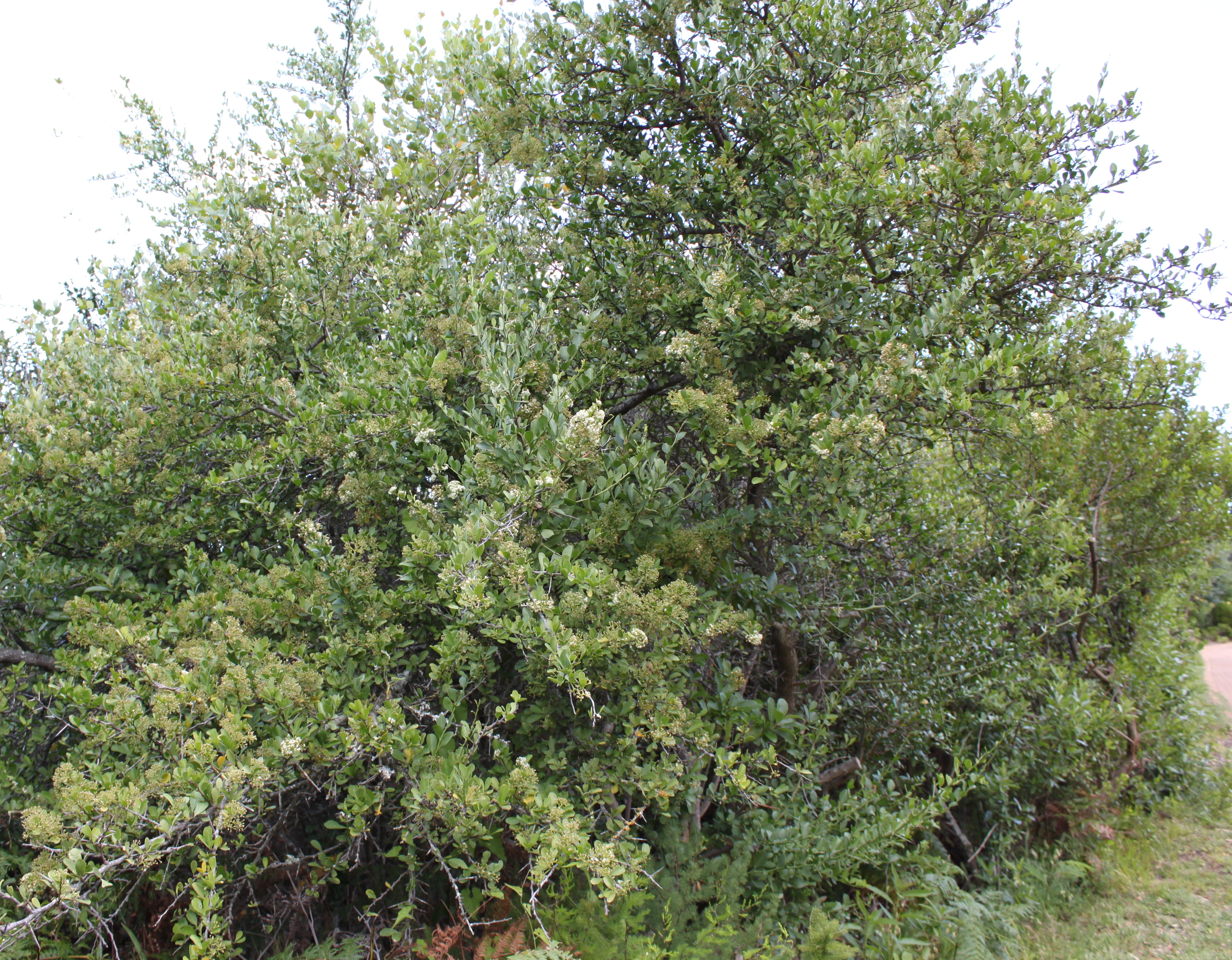
Gymnosporia heterophylla - African Spikethorn tree

== Education and career ==
Prins graduated from the University of Stellenbosch with a BSc in Botany. She completed her BSc(Hons) and MSc at the University of Pretoria. She obtained a PhD in botany with a thesis on Spikethorns of the world (Gymnosporia, Celastraceae). She was also involved in the development of a website containing information on South African trees aimed at both amateurs and scientists.

She assisted the authors with research for the book "Trees and Shrubs of Mpumalanga and The Kruger Park", published in 2002. She also corrected instances in the book where a plant had previously been described as a new variety and was later reclassified as a new species.

She worked at the South African National Biodiversity Institute and in 1999, she was listed as a Scientific officer for the National Herbarium involved in plant identification services and curation of the collection of flora, with special interest trees of southern Africa.

== Research and workshops ==
One study that Prins was involved in included 14 of the 17 genera accepted in the family Combretaceae, including 101 species and subspecies, in an effort to determine phylogenetic relationships. Samples were collected from field trips to:

- South Africa (Limpopo, Mpumalanga, Gauteng, KwaZulu-Natal provinces)
- Botswana
- Mozambique
- Namibia
- Zimbabwe

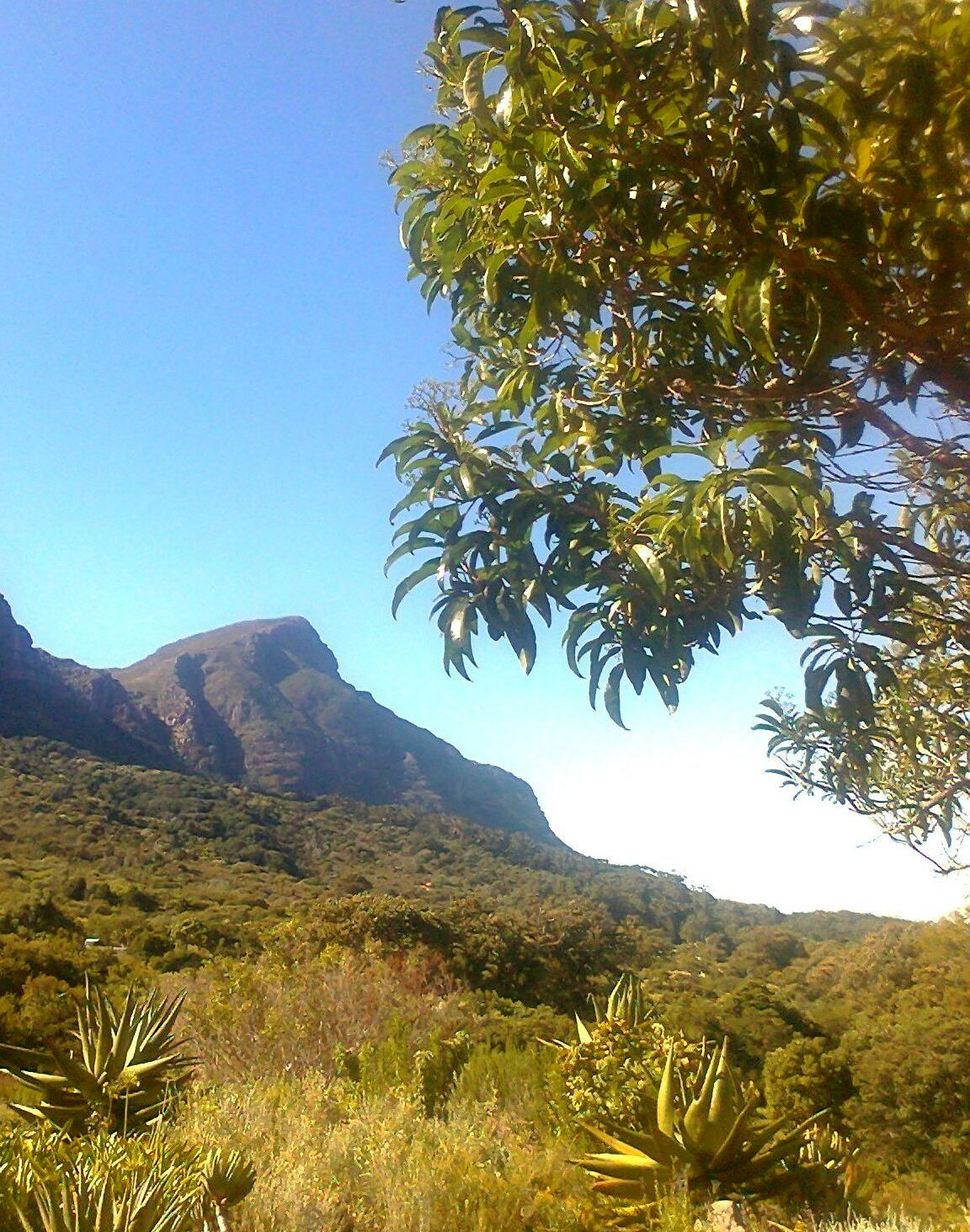
Kirstenbosch Botanical Gardens

Cultivated samples were also included from

- Lowveld National Botanical Garden (Nelspruit, South Africa)
- Pretoria National Botanical Garden (Pretoria, South Africa)
- Kirstenbosch National Botanical Garden (Cape Town, South Africa)
- National Botanic Garden, Harare (Zimbabwe)
- Honolulu Botanical Gardens
- Missouri Botanical Garden
- Royal Botanic Gardens, Kew

From 2008, Prins was involved in the annual summer-rainfall four-day workshop of the SANBI at Umtamvuna Nature Reserve, KwaZulu-Natal. She presented a Gymnosporia identification course for CREW (Custodians of Rare and Endangered Wildflowers) volunteers, students and members of the provincial conservation agencies.

In 2018 the Botanical Society of South Africa awarded Prins funding for "a taxonomic revision of part of the genus Olea". Taxonomy provides critical basic information to other branches of Botany (including conservation, environmental management and education) but is considered one of the least desirable parts of Botany and hence funding is difficult to obtain. The genus Olea had last been revised in 1963.

== Selected publications ==
- Jordaan, M.; van Wyk, A.E. (1998). "Systematic studies in subfamily Celastoideae (Celastraceae) in southern Africa: the genus Putterlickia". South African Journal of Botany. 64 (6): 322–329. doi:10.1016/S0254-6299(15)30919-4.
- SAPPI tree spotting | Lifer List (Google books) (1 ed.). Johannesburg: Jacana Media. 2004. ISBN 1770090363.
- Dictionary of names for southern African trees : Scientific names of indigenous trees, shrubs and climbers with common names from 30 languages (Hardcover). Pretoria: Briza. June 2011. p. 960. ISBN 9781920146016.
- Marie Jordaan; Abraham E. van Wyk. "Gymnosporia swazica (Celastraceae), a new species from southern Africa". Phytotaxa. 192 (4). Auckland, New Zealand: Mongolia Press. ISSN 1179-3163.

Prins has published extensively in the following journals:

- Bothalia - African Biodiversity and Conservation
- South African Journal of Botany
- Phytotaxa
- Taxon
- Kew Bulletin
