= Carla Maldonado =

Bolivian biologist

- Alma mater: Higher University of San Andrés; Aarhus University; University of Copenhagen
- Occupation: Biologist
- Employer: National herbarium of Bolivia; Higher University of San Andrés

Carla Maldonado is a Bolivian biologist whose field of work is plant species, in particular the genus Cinchona. Maldonado is a Professor at Universidad Mayor de San Andrés and a Director and Researcher at the Herbario Nacional de Bolivia. In 2016, Maldonado received the Marie Curie Award from the National Academy of Sciences of Bolivia.

== Career ==
Carla Brenda Maldonado Goyzueta received her B.S. degree in Biology from the Universidad Mayor de San Andrés. She later earned her master's degree in Biology from the University of Aarhus and her Ph.D. in Genomics and Evolution from the University of Copenhagen. Her Ph.D. thesis became a basis for her published book The Quest for Cinchona: A Phylogenetic Approach to Understanding the Evolution, Natural Variation and Discovery of Cinchona Bark for the Treatment of Malaria.

Maldonado was part of the Madidi Project to inventory flowers of National Parks and Protected Areas of the Madidi region.

Maldonado has done taxonomic work with the Rubiaceae and Ericaceae families. One of her most renowned studies is that related to the genus Cinchona, among which are her studies on Cinchona calisaya, from which quinine is extracted, as part of her doctoral thesis and the discovery of a new species called Cinchona anderssonii in 2017. These and other studies are focused on the healing properties of this genus, related to the cure of malaria.

== Awards and honors ==
- 2016, Marie Curie Award, National Academy of Sciences of Bolivia
