= Melva Philipson =

New Zealand botanist (1925–2015)

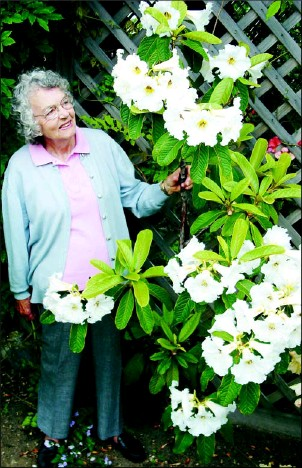
- Melva Philipson in 2007
- Born: Melva Noeline Crozier; 22 December 1925; Palmerston North, New Zealand
- Died: 29 April 2015 (aged 89); Nelson, New Zealand
- Education: University of Canterbury
- Known for: Study of genus Rhododendron
- Spouse: William Philipson (m. 1954; died 1997)
- Scientific career
- Fields: Botany
- Thesis: Cortaderia jubata (Gramineae): an autonomous apomict (1977)
- Doctoral advisor: Brian Fineran
- Author abbrev. (botany): M.N.Philipson

Melva Noeline Philipson (née Crozier; 22 December 1925 – 29 April 2015) was a New Zealand botanist.

== Biography ==
Philipson was born Melva Noeline Crozier in Palmerston North on 22 December 1925, the daughter of Gladys Crozier (née Eberhard) and Guy Neville Crozier. She was educated in Christchurch, at St Albans Primary School, Christchurch Girls' High School and Avonside Girls' High School. She graduated with a Bachelor of Science degree from Canterbury University College (now the University of Canterbury) in 1948. She initially worked for the Crop Research Division of the Department of Scientific and Industrial Research in Washdyke, South Canterbury, carrying out research into linen flax, and later established a research laboratory at Fletcher Holdings' linseed factory in Ashburton. When the plant closed 18 months later, Crozier moved to Wellington where she worked for the Department of Agriculture's Dairy Division testing milk powder and cheese for export.

Crozier decided to resume her studies, specialising in microbiology, and enrolled to study a master's degree in science at Lincoln Agricultural College (now Lincoln University). She graduated in 1953; her thesis was entitled Physiological studies on some bacteria isolated from clover roots. She remained in the Department of Microbiology until 1955 to carry out research on bacteria responsible for producing brightly coloured stains in wool fleeces. She also isolated an actinomycete from fleeces which in culture was able to cause degeneration of both wool fibre and human hair.

In 1954, Crozier married William Raymond Philipson, who was professor of botany at the University of Canterbury from 1954 to 1976.

From 1955 to 1962, Melva Philipson was a full-time mother and spent her spare time studying the genus Rhododendron; the gardens at Ilam, which the University of Canterbury had purchased for a new campus, had previously belonged to Edgar Stead, a rhododendron hybridist, and were filled with a wide range of species which Philipson began to study. In 1962, she was appointed an assistant to Eric Godley at the Botany Division of the Department of Scientific and Industrial Research. She began to establish a herbarium of Rhododendron species, and in 1968 she visited the herbarium at the Royal Botanic Garden, Edinburgh, to acquire additional samples.

In 1974, Philipson began to work on a PhD at the University of Canterbury, supervised by Brian Fineran, which she completed in 1977; her thesis, which involved the use of an electron microscope, was on embryology and ultrastructure.

After her retirement in 1990, Philipson returned to the establishment of the Rhododendron herbarium, and her husband Bill Philipson joined her in studying the genus. Together, the couple produced three major joint publications and their research became the largest embryological survey of a plant genus. They lived in Greytown until Bill Philipson's death in 1997. In 2003, Philipson moved to Stoke to be near her daughter, taking most of her Rhododendron collection with her. She died on 29 April 2015.

The standard author abbreviation M.N.Philipson is used to indicate this person as the author when citing a botanical name.
