= Mary Sophie Young =

American botanist (c.1872–1919)

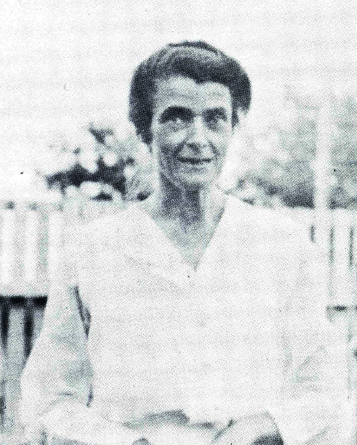
- Born: Mary Sophie Young; September 20, 1872; Glendale, Ohio, United States of America
- Died: March 5, 1919 (aged 46)
- Known for: Pioneer of plant taxonomy in Texas
- Scientific career
- Fields: Botany
- Institutions: University of Texas

Mary Sophie Young (ca. 1872–1919) was a botanist at the University of Texas significant for her field trips where she collected large quantities of specimens making her a key contributor to plant taxonomy in Texas.

== Early life and education ==
Young was on born September 20, 1872 (some accounts stating 1870) in Glendale, Ohio. Her parents were Charles Huntington, an Episcopalian minister, and Emma Adams Young. Young was the youngest of eight children, with seven older brothers. She was educated in Ohio and attended Wellesley College for her Bachelor's in 1895. After teaching at various schools in Sullivan, MO; Dundee, IL; Sycamore, IL; and Fond-du-lac, WI, Young attended the University of Chicago in 1900, where she received her Master’s of Science in 1907 and her PhD in 1910.

== Career ==
=== Teaching ===
In 1910, Young continued her teaching career at the University of Texas as a botany tutor and was promoted to the position of instructor the following year. After working as a teacher, she later gained tenure at the University of Texas where she became the curator of the university herbarium in 1912. She was known for her clear writing style during a time while there were limited laboratory directions on botany as well as for her teaching style that encouraged students to answer their own questions.

=== Research ===
Young frequently traveled throughout the Austin area collecting plant material. She maintained extensive logs during her travels in which she detailed the journey and plant specimens collected. These collections added a large number of specimens that had yet to be recorded in the University’s herbarium, transforming the size of the Texan University Herbarium from 2,500 to 16,000; its accompanying research resulted in two publications. Young also traveled to other parts of Texas, primarily West Texas, during the summers of 1914, 1915, 1916, and 1918. Many of her specimens are kept in the Philadelphia Academy of Natural Sciences and the United States National Herbarium. Unfortunately, her career was cut short in 1919 when an advanced stage form of cancer was found; she later died on March 5, 1919, at the age of 46. Young is remembered as a pioneering botanist who increased the content of the Herbarium at University of Texas at Austin and initiated specimen exchange relationships between UT Austin's Herbarium and others around the country.
