= Friedrich Markgraf =

German botanist (1897–1987)

Friedrich Markgraf (1 February 1897 in Berlin-Friedenau – 8 March 1987 in Zurich) was a German botanist.

== Life and work ==
After secondary school, Markgraf studied biology at the Friedrich Wilhelm University of Berlin. In 1922, he was awarded a Ph.D. for a thesis on the subject of a botanic-ecological study of the Bredower forest near Berlin.

After his habilitation he became first a professor of botany at the Friedrich Wilhelm University of Berlin and then at the Ludwig-Maximilians-Universität München and director of the Botanical Garden Munich-Nymphenburg (1956-1958). Markgraf was also visiting professor of botany at the University of Zurich. During his teaching and research activities, he was primarily concerned with questions of botanical systematics, plant morphology and phytogeography and he also undertook research while travelling in the Mediterranean. In particular, he made an important start on the study of the local flora of Albania. He acted as the Regional Adviser on Albania for Flora Europaea.

He was married to the botanist Ingeborg Markgraf-Dannenberg.

== Publications ==
- Die Bredower Forst bei Berlin, Dissertation, Friedrich-Wilhelms-Universität zu Berlin, 1922
- Kleines Praktikum der Vegetationskunde, 1926
- An den Grenzen des Mittelmeergebiete, 1927
- In Albaniens Bergen, 1930
- Pflanzen aus Albanien 1928, 1931
- Prodromus florae peninsulae Balcanicae / Fasc. 2. Dicotyledoncae Sympetalae 1928–1931, 1931
- Pflanzengeographie von Albanien, 1932
- Prodromus florae peninsulae Balcanicae / Fasc. 3. Monocotyle doucae 1932–1933, 1933
- Vegetationsstudien im Naturschutzgebiet Bellinchen, 1937
- Blumen der Alpen, co-author Josef Weisz, 1954
- Blumen der Berge, co-author Josef Weisz, 1954
- Formen des Lebens, 1957
- Illustrierte Flora von Mitteleuropa / Bd. 4. / T. 1, 2. Auflage, 1958–1963
- Mitteilungen aus dem Botanischen Museum der Universität Zürich / 219. Der morphologische Bau einer Merendera-Art der türkischen Steppe, 1962
- Führer durch die Freilandanlagen des Botanischen Gartens in München-Nymphenburg, 1966
- Repertorium specierum novarum regni vegetabilis / Beiheft Bd. 30. Prodromus florae peninsulae Balcanicae / Bd. 2. Dicotyledoneae sympetalae, Nachdruck 1970
- Repertorium specierum novarum regni vegetabilis / Beiheft Bd. 30. Prodromus florae peninsulae Balcanicae / Bd. 3. Monocotyledoneae, Nachdruck 1971
- Illustrierte Flora von Mitteleuropa / Bd. 1. Gymnospermae, Angiospermae / Teil 2, 1981

== Sources ==
- Meyers Großes Personenlexikon. Mannheim 1968, page 857.
- Hermann Merxmüller, Walter Guttermann: "Eine neue Moehringien-Sippe aus den Südalpen. Professor Friedrich Markgraf zum 60. Geburtstag". In: Phyton: Annales rei botanicae. 30 April 1957.
