= Ingeborg Markgraf-Dannenberg =

Swiss botanist

Ingeborg Markgraf-Dannenberg (18 March 1911 – 22 March 1996) was a Swiss naturalist, botanist, taxonomist, and teacher noted for her work at the Institute for Systematic Botany at the University of Zurich, in particular her work classifying the genus Festuca. She described over 120 species, and the grass Festuca markgrafiae was named in her honor. The standard author abbreviation Markgr.-Dann. is used to indicate this person as the author when citing a botanical name.

She was born in Berlin, and was married to the botanist Friedrich Markgraf. She died in Zürich, aged 85.
