= Karl Mädler =

Karl A. Mädler (born 9 December 1902 – 22 October 2003) was a German paleobotanist and palynologist.

Mädler was initially a pharmacist in Seifhennersdorf for a few years and studied the Oligocene fossil flora in the nearby region. From 1931 he studied paleobotany of Tertiary floras with Richard Kräusel and was a research assistant at the Naturmuseum Senckenberg in Frankfurt. Due to unfortunate circumstances, Mädler's planned doctoral thesis initially failed to materialize, but in 1939 he published a noteworthy article on Pliocene fossil flora (known as the "Klärbecken-Flora") found during the construction of the sewage treatment plant in Frankfurt. After WW II, he was initially an assistant supervisor in the Lower Saxony State Museum and from 1955 at the Lower Saxony State Office for Soil Research in Hannover. In addition, he continued his studies at the Technical University of Hannover, where he received his doctorate (Promotion) in paleobotany in 1963. His dissertation "Die geologische Verbreitung von Sporen und Pollen in der Deutsche Trias" on fossil spores and pollen of the Germanic Trias was received as an important contribution to paleobotany. The dissertation was published 1964 as "Beiheifte zum Geologischen Jahrbuch, 65" (Supplements to the Geological Yearbook, Volume 65). In 1967 he retired, but remained scientifically active and published a scientific article in 1992 when he was 90 years old.

In addition to fossil spores and pollen from the Mesozoic and fossil phytoplankton from the Posidonia Shale of the Lower Jurassic, he also worked on pollen and spore material from archaeological excavations and dealt with the leaf systematics of angiosperms from the Cretaceous and Tertiary.

Karl Mädler is remembered as a modest man never really boosting himself, but he was well recognized by the community of German speaking palaeontologists. In spite of a number of pioneering contributions to palaeobotany and palynology, his international recognition regrettably always remained limited because he published his work mostly in German; only three out of his 54 publications are in English. An appreciation of Karl Mädler was published by Benda (1996) in a special issue (200) of the „Neues Jahrbuch für Geologie und Paläontologie - Abhandlungen“ at the occasion of his 95th birthday.
