= Karl Friedrich Meinshausen =

Karl Friedrich Meinshausen (born 1819 - died 1899) was a German botanist.

Meinshausen issued the exsiccata series Herbarium florae Ingricae.
