= List of botanists by author abbreviation (H) =

This is an incomplete list of botanists by their author abbreviation, which is designed for citation with the botanical names or works that they have published. This list follows that established by Brummitt & Powell (1992). Use of that list is recommended by Rec. 46A Note 1 of the International Code of Nomenclature for algae, fungi, and plants. The list is kept up to date online at The International Plant Names Index and Index Fungorum.

In some cases an "author abbreviation" consists of a full surname, while in other cases the surname is abbreviated and/or accompanied by one or more initials. There is no space between the initials and the surname (or its abbreviation).

==== Order of entries ====
The list here is maintained strictly in order of the alphabetic characters in the abbreviation; thus "A.B.Jacks." appears under "A" not "J", and is located as if the characters were "ABJACKS". Capitalization is ignored as are all non-alphabetic characters such as "." and space. Diacritical marks are also ignored, so that, e.g., "ü" is treated as if it were "u".

==== Navigation ====
Because of its length, the list is split across separate pages. All alphabetic sections can be accessed from the short table of contents; the vertical bars show the page divisions. Searching will only find an entry within a page.

== A–G ==
Contents:	A	B	C	D	E F	G	H	I J	K L	M	N O	P	Q R	S	T U V	W X Y Z

To find entries for A–G, use the table of contents above.

== H ==
Contents: Top	A	B	C	D	E F	G	H	I J	K L	M	N O	P	Q R	S	T U V	W X Y Z

- **Ha** – Thi Dung Ha (fl. 1970)
- **Haage** – Friedrich Adolph Haage (1796–1866)
- **H.A.Baker** – Hugh Arthur Baker (1896–1976)
- **Hablitz** – Carl Ludwig von Hablitz (also as Karl Ivanovich Gablits) (1752–1821)
- **Hack.** – Eduard Hackel (1850–1926)
- **Hacq.** – Belsazar Hacquet (1739–1815)
- **H.A.Crum** – Howard Alvin Crum (1922–2002)
- **Haeckel** – Ernst Haeckel (1834–1919)
- **Haegi** – Laurence Arnold Robert Haegi (born 1952)
- **Haenke** – Thaddäus Haenke (1761–1817)
- **Haev.** – Thomas Haevermans (fl. 2000)
- **Hagara** – Ladislav Hagara (born 1944)
- **Hagberg** - Mats Hagberg (born 1955)
- **Hagedorn** – Gregor Hagedorn (born 1965)
- **Hagenb.** – Carl Friedrich Hagenbach (1771–1849)
- **Haines** – Henry Haselfoot Haines (1867–1945)
- **Häkkinen** – Markku Häkkinen (1946–2015)
- **Halácsy** – Eugen von Halácsy (1842–1913)
- **Halda** – Josef Jakob Halda (born 1943)
- **Halford** – David A. Halford (fl. 1992)
- **Haller** – Albrecht von Haller (1708–1777)
- **Haller f.** – Albrecht von Haller (son of the above) (1758–1823)
- **Hallier** – Ernst Hans Hallier (1831–1904)
- **Hallier f.** – Johannes Gottfried Hallier (1868–1932)
- **Ham.** – William Hamilton (1783–1856)
- **Hambali** – Gregori G. Hambali (fl. 2000)
- **Hamel** – Gontran Georges Henri Hamel (1883–1944)
- **Hammel** – Barry Edward Hammel (born 1946)
- **Hamer** – Fritz Hamer (1912–2004)
- **Hämet-Ahti** – Raija-Leena Hämet-Ahti (born 1931)
- **H.A.Mill.** – Harvey Alfred Miller (1928–2020)
- **Hammen** – Thomas van der Hammen (1924–2010)
- **Hampe** – Georg Ernst Ludwig Hampe (1795–1880)
- **Hance** – Henry Fletcher Hance (1827–1886)
- **Hancock** – Thomas Hancock (1783–1849)
- **Hand.-Mazz.** – Heinrich Raphael Eduard Handel-Mazzetti (1882–1940)
- **Hanelt** – Peter Hanelt (1930–2019)
- **Hanes** – Clarence Robert Hanes (1876–1956)
- **Hanin** – Jean-Louis Hanin (fl. 1800)
- **Hanks** – Lena Tracy Hanks (1879–1944)
- **Hannaford** – Samuel Hannaford (1828–1874)
- **Hanry** – Hippolyte Hanry (1807–1893)
- **Hanst.** – Johannes Ludwig Emil Robert von Hanstein (1822–1880)
- **Har.** – Paul Auguste Hariot (1854–1917)
- **Hara** – Kanesuke Hara (1885–1962)
- **Harb.** – Thomas Grant Harbison (1862–1936)
- **Hard** – Miron Elisha Hard (1849–1914)
- **Hardin** – James Walker Hardin (born 1929)
- **Harid.** – K. Haridasan (fl. 1985)
- **Harkn.** – Harvey Willson Harkness (sometimes spelled Wilson) (1821–1901)
- **Harling** – Gunnar Wilhelm Harling (1920–2010)
- **Harmaja** – Harri Harmaja (born 1944)
- **Harms** – Hermann Harms (1870–1942)
- **Harris** – William H. Harris (1860–1920)
- **Harry Hall** – Harry Hall (1906–1986)
- **Hart** – Henry Chichester Hart (1847–1908)
- **Hartig** – Theodor Hartig (1805–1880)
- **Harting** – Pieter Harting (1812–1885)
- **Hartinger** – Anton Hartinger (1806–1890)
- **Hartland** – William Baylor Hartland (1836–1912)
- **Hartm.** – Carl Johan Hartman (1790–1849)
- **Hartog** – Cornelis den Hartog (born 1931)
- **Hartw.** – Karl Theodor Hartweg (1812–1871)
- **Hartwig** – August Karl Julius Hartwig (1823–1913)
- **Hartwiss** – Nicolai Anders von Hartwiss (1791–1860)
- **Harv.** – William Henry Harvey (1811–1866)
- **Harv.-Gibs.** – Robert John Harvey-Gibson (1860–1929)
- **Harvill** – Alton McCaleb Harvill, Jr (1916–2008)
- **Harz** – Carl Otto Harz (1842–1906)
- **Hass** – Hagen Hass (fl. 1993)
- **Hassall** – Arthur Hill Hassall (1817–1894)
- **Hässel** – Gabriela Gustava Hässel de Menéndez (1927–2009)
- **Hasselq.** – Fredric Hasselquist (1722–1752)
- **Hasselt** – Johan Coenraad van Hasselt (1797–1823)
- **Hassk.** – Justus Carl Hasskarl (1811–1894)
- **Hassl.** – Emil Hassler (1864–1937)
- **Hatch** – Edwin Daniel Hatch (1919–2008)
- **Hatus.** – Sumihiko Hatusima (1906–2008)
- **Hauenschild** – Frank Hauenschild (fl. 2016)
- **Haufler** – Christopher H. Haufler (born 1950)
- **Haught.** – Samuel Haughton (1821–1897)
- **Hauke** – Richard L. Hauke (1930–2001)
- **Hauman** – Lucien Leon Hauman (1880–1965)
- **Hauser** – Margit Luise Hauser
- **Hausskn.** – Heinrich Carl Haussknecht (1838–1903)
- **Hav.** – Johan Jonson Havaas (1864–1956)
- **Havard** – Valéry Havard (1846–1927)
- **Havil.** – George Darby Haviland (1857–1901)
- **Haw.** – Adrian Hardy Haworth (1768–1833)
- **Hawke** – Margaret Louise Hawke (born 1984)
- **Hawkes** – John Gregory Hawkes (1915–2007)
- **Hawkeswood** – Trevor J. Hawkeswood (born 1956)
- **Hawksw.** – Frank Goode Hawksworth (1926–1993)
- **Hayata** – Bunzō Hayata (1874–1934)
- **Hayek** – August von Hayek (1871–1928)
- **Haynald** – Cardinal Stephan Franz Lajos (Ludwig) Haynald (1816–1891)
- **Hayne** – Friedrich Gottlob Hayne (1763–1832)
- **Haynes** – Caroline Coventry Haynes (1858–1951)
- **Haynie** – Nellie Violet Haynie (1886–1980)
- **Hazsl.** – Friedrich August Hazslinszky von Hazslin (1818–1896)
- **H.Baumann** – Helmut Baumann (1937–2014)
- **H.B.Holl** — Harvey Buchanan Holl (1820–1886)
- **H.Blossf.** – Harry Blossfeld (1913–1986)
- **H.B.Matthews** – Henry Bleneowe Matthews (1861–1934)
- **H.B.Naithani** – H.B. Naithani (born 1944)
- **H.Bock** – Hieronymus Bock (1498–1554)
- **H.Bruggen** – Heinrich Wilhelm Eduard (Harry) van Bruggen (1927–2010)
- **H.Buek.** – Heinrich Wilhelm Buek (1796–1878)
- **H.Buch** – Hans Robert Viktor Buch (1883–1964)
- **H.B.Wang** – Hai Bo Wang (fl. 2008)
- **H.B.Ward** – Henry Baldwin Ward (1865–1945)
- **H.B.Will** – Herbert Bennett Williamson (1860–1931)
- **H.C.Beardslee** – Henry Curtis Beardslee, Sr. (1807–1884) (father of Henry Curtis Beardslee, Jr. (1865–1948, abbrev. **Beardslee**))
- **H.C.Bold** – Harold Charles Bold (1909–1987)
- **H.C.Cutler** – Hugh Carson Cutler (1912–1998)
- **H.C.Hall** – Herman Christiaan van Hall (1801–1874)
- **H.Chuang** – Hsuan Chuang (born 1938)
- **H.C.Watson** – Hewett Watson (1804–1881)
- **H.D.Clarke** – Hugh David Clarke (born 1962)
- **H.Deane** – Henry Deane (1847–1924)
- **H.De Orléans** – Prince Henri of Orléans (1877–1904)
- **H.D.Harr.** – Harold David Harrington (1903–1981)
- **H.Dietr.** – Helga Dietrich (1940–2018)
- **H.Durand** – Hélène Durand (1883–1934)
- **H.D.Wilson** – Hugh Wilson (born 1945)
- **Heads** – Michael J. Heads (born 1957)
- **H.E.Ahles** – Harry E. Ahles (1924–1981)
- **Heatubun** – Charlie Danny Heatubun (born 1973)
- **H.E.Bigelow** – Howard E. Bigelow (1923–1987)
- **Heckard** – Lawrence Ray Heckard (1923–1991)
- **Heckel** – Édouard Marie Heckel (1843–1916)
- **Hector** – James Hector (1834–1907)
- **Hedberg** – Karl Olov Hedberg (1923–2007)
- **Hedd.** – Terry Albert John Hedderson (born 1962)
- **Hedge** – Ian Charleson Hedge (1928–2022)
- **Hedl.** – Johan Teodor Hedlund (1861–1953)
- **Hedrick** – Ulysses Prentiss Hedrick (1870–1951)
- **Hedw.** – Johann (Johannes, Joannis) Hedwig (1730–1799)
- **Heenan** – Peter Brian Heenan (born 1961)
- **Heer** – Oswald von Heer (1809–1883)
- **Heering** – Wilhelm Christian August Heering (1876–1916)
- **Heese** – Emil Heese (1862–1914)
- **Hegde** – R.K. Hegde (1931–1991)
- **Hegelm.** – Christoph Friedrich Hegelmaier (1833–1906)
- **Hegetschw.** – Johannes Jacob Hegetschweiler (1789–1839)
- **H.E.Horne** – Howard E. Horne (fl. 2016)
- **H.Eichler** – Hansjörg Eichler (1916–1992)
- **Heijkoop** – Marcel Heijkoop (fl. 2016)
- **Heil** – Hans Albrecht Heil (1899–1969)
- **Heim** – Georg Christoph Heim (1743–1807)
- **Heimerl** – Anton Heimerl (1857–1942)
- **Heine** – Hermann Heino Heine (1922–1996)
- **Heinr.** – Emil Johann Lambert Heinricher (1856–1934)
- **Heintze** – August Heintze (1881–1941)
- **Heiser** – Charles Bixler Heiser (1920–2010)
- **Heist.** – Lorenz Heister (1683–1758)
- **H.E.K.Hartmann** – Heidrun Hartmann (1942–2016)
- **Hekking** – William Henri Alphonse Maria Hekking (1930–1996)
- **Heldr.** – Theodor Heinrich Hermann von Heldreich (1822–1902)
- **Hell.** – Carl Niclas Hellenius (1745–1820)
- **Hellq.** – Carl Barre Hellquist (born 1940)
- **Hellqv.** – Sven Hellqvist (fl. 1993)
- **Helms** – Richard Helms (1842–1914)
- **Helwing** – George Andreas (Jerzy Andrzej) Helwing (1666–1748)
- **H.E.Moore** – Harold Emery Moore (1917–1980)
- **Hemprich** – Wilhelm Hemprich (1796–1825)
- **Hemsl.** – William Botting Hemsley (1843–1924)
- **Hend.** – Edward George Henderson (1782–1876)
- **Hendel** – Johann Christian Hendel (1742–1823)
- **Hendriks** – Kasper P. Hendriks (fl. 2023)
- **Hendrych** – Radovan Hendrych (1926–2004)x
- **Henfr.** – Arthur Henfrey (1819–1859)
- **Henn.** – Paul Christoph Hennings (1841–1908)
- **Hennessy** – Esmé Frances Hennessy (1933–2023)
- **Henrard** – Johannes Theodoor Henrard (1881–1974)
- **Henrickson** – James Solberg Henrickson (born 1940)
- **Henriq.** – Julio Augusto Henriques (1838–1928)
- **Henry H.Johnst.** – Henry Halcro Johnston (1856–1939)
- **Hensch.** – August Wilhelm Eduard Theodor Henschel (1790–1856)
- **Hensen** – Victor Hensen (1835–1924)
- **Hensl.** – John Stevens Henslow (1796–1861)
- **Henssen** – Aino Marjatta Henssen (1925–2011)
- **Henwood** – Murray J. Henwood (fl. 1998)
- **H.E.Petersen** – Henning Eiler (Ejler) Petersen (1877–1946)
- **Hepper** – Frank Nigel Hepper (1929–2013)
- **Hepting** – George Henry Hepting (1907–1988)
- **Herb.** – William Herbert (1778–1847)
- **Herbich** – Franz Herbich (1791–1865)
- **Herder** – Ferdinand Gottfried Theobald von Herder (1828–1896)
- **Hereman** – Samuel Hereman (fl. 1868)
- **Hérincq** – François Hérincq (1820–1891)
- **Hering** – Constantine (Constantijn) J. Hering (1800–1880)
- **Herklots** – Geoffrey Alton Craig Herklots (1902–1986)
- **Herm.** – Paul Hermann (1646–1695)
- **Hermans** – Johan Hermans (born 1956)
- **Herre** – Albert William Herre (1868–1962)
- **Herrm.** – Johann Herrmann (1738–1800)
- **Hersc.** – Josephine Clare Herscovitch (born 1957)
- **Hershk.** – Mark A. Hershkovitz (born 1946)
- **Herter** – Wilhelm(Guillermo) Gustav(o) Franz(Francis) Herter (1884–1958)
- **Herv.** – Alpheus Baker Hervey (1839–1931)
- **Herzog** – Theodor Carl Julius Herzog (1880–1961)
- **Heslewood** – Margaret M. Heslewood (fl. 2013)
- **Hesl.-Harr.** – John William Heslop-Harrison (1881–1967)
- **Hesl.-Harr.f.** – Jack Heslop-Harrison (1920–1998)
- **Hess** – Johann Jakob Hess (1844–1883)
- **Hesse** – Hermann Albrecht Hesse (1852–1937)
- **Hester** – Jay Pinckney Hester (1874–1962)
- **Hett.** – Wilbert Hetterscheid (born 1957)
- **Heubl** – Günther Heubl (born 1952)
- **Heuff.** – János (Johann) A. Heuffel (1800–1857)
- **H.E.White** – Harold Everett White (born 1899)
- **Heward** – Robert Heward (1791–1877)
- **Hewson** – Helen Joan Hewson (1938–2007)
- **Heybroek** – Hans M. Heybroek (1927–2022)
- **Heyn** – Chaia Clara Heyn (1924–1998)
- **Heynh.** – Gustav Heynhold (1800–1860)
- **Heywood** – Vernon Hilton Heywood (1927–2022)
- **H.F.Comber** – Harold Frederick Comber (1897–1969)
- **H.F.Copel.** – Herbert Faulkner Copeland (1902–1968)
- **H.Fisch.** – Hugo Fischer (1865–1939)
- **H.Fleischm.** – Hans Fleischmann (1875-1928)
- **H.F.Loomis** – Harold Frederick Loomis (1896–1976)
- **H.Friedrich** – Heimo Friedrich (fl. 1974)
- **H.F.Yan** – Hai-Fei Yan (fl. 2012)
- **H.G.Baker** – Herbert George Baker (1920–2001)
- **H.G.Barclay** – Harriet George Barclay (1901–1990)
- **H.G.P.Duyfjes** – Hendrik Gerard Pieter Duyfjes (1908–1943)
- **H.Groves** – Henry Groves (1855–1912)
- **H.Gross** – Hugo Gross (1888–1968)
- **H.G.Sm.** – Henry George Smith (1852–1924)
- **H.Hara** – Hiroshi Hara (1911–1986)
- **H.H.Bancr.** – Helen Holme Bancroft (1887–1950)
- **H.H.Blom** – Hans Haavardsholm Blom (born 1955)
- **H.H.Eaton** – Hezekiah Hulbert Eaton (1809–1832)
- **H.H.Hume** – Hardrada Harold Hume (1875–1965)
- **H.H.Johnst.** – Henry "Harry" Hamilton Johnston (1858–1927)
- **H.H.Lin** – Hong Hui Lin (fl. 2007)
- **H.Hoffm.** – Heinrich Karl Hermann Hoffmann (1819–1891)
- **H.Huber** – Herbert Franz Josef Huber (1931–2005)
- **H.H.White** – Henry Hoply White (1790–1876)
- **Hickel** – Paul Robert Hickel (1865–1935)
- **Hidayat** – Iman Hidayat (fl. 2006)
- **Hiepko** – Paul Hubertus Hiepko (1932–2019)
- **Hiern** – William Philip Hiern (1839–1925)
- **Hieron.** – Georg Hans Emmo Wolfgang Hieronymus (1846–1921)
- **Hildebr.** – Friedrich Hermann Gustav Hildebrand (1835–1915)
- **Hildebrandt** – Johann Maria Hildebrandt (1847–1881)
- **Hildm.** – Heinrich Hildmann (ca. 1845–after 1918)
- **Hilend** – Martha Luella Hilend (1902–1964)
- **Hilg.** – Theodore Charles Hilgard (1828–1875)
- **Hilger** – Hartmut H. Hilger (born 1948)
- **Hill** – John Hill (1716–1775)
- **Hillebr.** – William (Wilhelm) Hillebrand (1821–1886)
- **Hillh.** – William Hillhouse (1850–1910)
- **Hilliard** – Olive Mary Hilliard (1925–2022)
- **Hillier** – Louis Hillier (Louis Édouard Joseph Hillier; 1871–1962)
- **Hillmann** – Johannes Hillmann (1881–1943)
- **H.Iltis** – Hugo Iltis (1882–1952)
- **Himmelr.** – Sven Himmelreich (fl. 2007)
- **Hind** – William Marsden Hind (1815–1894)
- **Hindm.** – Mary MacLean Hindmarsh (1921–2000)
- **Hinds** – Richard Brinsley Hinds (1811–1846)
- **Hirmer** – Max Hirmer (1893–1981)
- **Hirn** – Karl Engelbrecht Hirn (1872–1907)
- **Hising.** – Wilhelm Hisinger (1766–1852)
- **Hislop** – Michael Clyde Hislop (born 1955)
- **Hitchc.** – Albert Spear Hitchcock (1865–1935)
- **H.Jacobsen** – Hermann Johannes Heinrich Jacobsen (1898–1978)
- **H.Jaeger** – Hermann Jäger (1815–1890)
- **H.J.Atkins** – Hannah Jane Atkins (born 1971)
- **H.J.Br.** – Helen Jean Brown (1903–1982)
- **H.J.Carter** – Herbert James Carter (1858–1940)
- **H.J.Chowdhery** – Harsh Jeet Chowdhery (born 1949)
- **H.J.Lam** – Herman Johannes Lam (1892–1977)
- **H.J.P.Winkl.** – Hubert J.P. Winkler (1875–1941)
- **H.J.Su** – Horng Jye Su (born 1943)
- **H.J.Suh** – Hwa Jung Suh (fl. 2015)
- **H.J.Thomps.** – Henry Joseph Thompson (born 1921)
- **H.J.Veitch** – Harry James Veitch (1840–1924)
- **H.Karst.** – Gustav Karl Wilhelm Hermann Karsten (1817–1908)
- **H.K.A.Winkl.** – Hans Karl Albert Winkler (1877–1945)
- **H.Keng** – Hsüan Keng (1923–2009)
- **H.Kenn.** – Helen Kennedy (born 1944)
- **K.K.Orel** – Harvey K. Orel (fl. 2020)
- **H.Kost.** – Henry Koster (1793–1820)
- **H.Koyama** – Hiroshige Koyama (1937–2016)
- **H.Kurz** – Hermann Kurz (1886–1965)
- **H.K.Walter** – Heinrich (Karl) Walter (1898–1989)
- **Hladnik** – Franz Hladnik (1773–1844)
- **H.L.Blomq.** – Hugo Leander Blomquist (1888–1964)
- **H.Lév.** – Augustin Abel Hector Léveillé (1863–1918)
- **H.Li** – Heng Li (1929–2023)
- **H.Limpr.** – Hans Wolfgang Limpricht (born 1877)
- **H.Lindb.** – Harald Lindberg (1871–1963)
- **H.L.Jacobs** – Homer L. Jacobs (1899–1981)
- **H.L.Li** – Hui-lin Li (1911–2002)
- **H.Lorentz** – Hendrikus Albertus Lorentz (1871–1944) (not Hendrik Lorentz)
- **H.Low** – Hugh Low (1824–1905)
- **H.L.Sm.** – Hamilton Lanphere Smith (1819–1903)
- **H.L.Späth** – Hellmut Ludwig Späth (1885–1945)
- **H.Luther** – Harry Edward Luther (1952–2012)
- **H.L.Wendl.** – Heinrich Ludolph Wendland (1792–1869)
- **H.Mann** – Horace Mann Jr. (1844–1868)
- **H.Mason** – Herbert Louis Mason (1896–1994)
- **H.M.Curran** – Hugh McCollum Curran (1875–1960) (also Hugh McCullum Curran)
- **H.M.Hall** – Harvey Monroe Hall (1874–1932)
- **H.M.Hern.** – Héctor Manuel Hernández (born 1954), aka Héctor Hernández Macías
- **H.M.L.Forbes** – Helena M.L. Forbes (1900–1959)
- **H.Mohr.** – Hartmut Mohr (fl. 1984)
- **H.Moseley** – Henry Nottidge Moseley (1844–1891)
- **H.Müll.** – Heinrich Ludwig Hermann Müller (1829–1883)
- **H.M.Ward** – Harry Marshall Ward (1854–1906)
- **H.N.Andrews** – Henry Nathaniel Andrews (1910–2002)
- **Hnatiuk** – Roger James Hnatiuk (born 1946)
- **H.N.Barber** – Horace Barber (1914–1971)
- **H.Nicholson** – Henry Alleyne Nicholson (1844–1899)
- **Hobdy** – R.W. Hobdy (fl. 1984)
- **Hobson** – Edward Hobson (1782–1830)
- **Hoch** – Peter C. Hoch (born 1950)
- **Hochr.** – Bénédict Pierre Georges Hochreutiner (1873–1959)
- **Hochst.** – Christian Ferdinand Friedrich Hochstetter (1787–1860)
- **Hodel** – Donald Robert Hodel (born 1953)
- **Hodgdon** – Albion Reed Hodgdon (1909–1976)
- **Hoefker** – Heinrich Hoefker (1859–1945)
- **Høeg** – Ove Arbo Høeg (1898–1993)
- **Hoehne** – Frederico Carlos Hoehne (1882–1959)
- **Hoevel** – Otto Hövel (fl. 1970)
- **Hoeven** – Jan van der Hoeven (1801–1868)
- **Hoffm.** – Georg Franz Hoffmann (1760–1826)
- **Hoffmanns.** – Johann Centurius von Hoffmannsegg (1766–1849)
- **Hoffmeister** – Werner Hoffmeister (1819–1845)
- **Hoffstad** – Olaf Alfred Hoffstad (1865–1943)
- **H.O.Forbes** – Henry Ogg Forbes (1851–1932)
- **Hogg** – Thomas Hogg (1777–1855)
- **H.Ohashi** – Hiroyoshi Ohashi (born 1936)
- **H.Ohba** – Hideaki Ohba (born 1943)
- **Hohen.** – Rudolph Friedrich Hohenacker (1798–1874)
- **Höhn.** – Franz Xaver Rudolf von Höhnel (1852–1920)
- **H.Okada** – Hiroshi Okada (born 1963)
- **Holland** – John Henry Holland (1869–1950)
- **Hollick** – Charles Arthur Hollick (1857–1933)
- **Holloway** – John Ernest Holloway (1881–1945)
- **Hollrung** – Max Udo Hollrung (1858–1937)
- **Holmb.** – Otto Rudolf Holmberg (1874–1930)
- **Holmes** – Edward Morell Holmes (1843–1930)
- **Holmgren** – Hjalmar Josef Holmgren (1822–1885)
- **Holm-Niels.** – Lauritz B. Holm-Nielsen (born 1946)
- **Holmsk.** – Johan Theodor Holmskjold (1731–1793)
- **Holttum** – Richard Eric Holttum (1895–1990)
- **Holub** – Josef Ludwig Holub (1930–1999)
- **Holz.** – John Michael Holzinger (1853–1929)
- **Hombr.** – Jacques Bernard Hombron (1800–1852)
- **Homolle** – Anne-Marie Homolle (1912–2006)
- **Honck.** – Gerhard August Honckeny (1724–1805)
- **Honda** – Masaji Honda (1897–1984)
- **Honegger** – Rosmarie Honegger (born 1947)
- **Honey** – Edwin Earle Honey (1891–1956)
- **Hong-Wa** – Cynthia Hong-Wa (fl. 2009)
- **Hong Yu** – Hong Yu (fl. 2003)
- **Hoog** – Johannes Marius Cornelis Hoog (1865–1950)
- **Hoogland** – Ruurd Dirk Hoogland (1922–1994)
- **Hook.** – William Jackson Hooker (1785–1865)
- **Hook.f.** – Joseph Dalton Hooker (1817–1911)
- **Hoopes** – Josiah Hoopes (1832–1904)
- **Hoot** – Sara B. Hoot (fl. 1995)
- **Hoppe** – David Heinrich Hoppe (1760–1846)
- **Hopper** – Stephen Hopper (born 1951)
- **Hoque** – Akramul Hoque (born 1971)
- **Hora** – Frederick Bayard Hora (1908–1984)
- **Horan.** – Paul Fedorowitsch Horaninow (1796–1865)
- **Horik.** – Yoshiwo Horikawa (1902–1976)
- **Horkel** – Johann Horkel (1769–1846)
- **Horne** – John Horne (1835–1905)
- **Hornem.** – Jens Wilken Hornemann (1770–1841)
- **Hornsch.** – Christian Friedrich Hornschuch (1793–1850)
- **Horobin** – John F. Horobin (fl. 1990)
- **Horridge** – W. Horridge (fl. 1916)
- **Horsf.** – Thomas Horsfield (1773–1859)
- **Horw.** – Arthur Reginald Horwood (1879–1937)
- **Hosaka** – Edward Yataro Hosaka (1907–1961)
- **H.Osborn** – Henry Stafford Osborn (1823–1894)
- **Hosok.** – Takahide Hosokawa (1909–1981)
- **Hosseus** – Carl Curt Hosseus (1878–1950)
- **Host** – Nicolaus Thomas Host (1761–1834)
- **Hotchk.** – Arland Tillotson Hotchkiss (1918–1991)
- **Hough** – Romeyn Beck Hough (1857–1924)
- **Houghton** – Arthur Duvernoix Houghton (1870–1938)
- **House** – Homer Doliver House (1878–1949)
- **Houst.** – William Houstoun (1695–1733)
- **Houtt.** – Maarten Houttuyn (1720–1798)
- **Houtz.** – Gysbertus Houtzagers (1888–1957)
- **Hovel.** – Maurice Jean Alexandre Hovelacque (1858–1898)
- **Hovenkamp** – Peter Hans Hovenkamp (1953–2019)
- **Howard** – John Eliot Howard (1807–1883)
- **Howcroft** – N.H.S. Howcroft (fl. 1981)
- **Howe** – Elliot Calvin Howe (1828–1899)
- **Howell** – Thomas Jefferson Howell (1842–1912)
- **H.O.Yates** – Harris Oliver Yates (1934–2013)
- **Hoyos-Gómez** – Saúl E. Hoyos-Gómez (fl. 2017)
- **H.P.Banks** – Harlan Parker Banks (1913–1998)
- **H.Pearson** – Henry Harold Welch Pearson (1870–1916)
- **H.Peng** – Hua Peng (born 1960)
- **H.Perrier** – Joseph Marie Henry Alfred Perrier de la Bâthie (1873–1958)
- **H.Pfeiff.** – Hans Heinrich Pfeiffer (1890–1970)
- **H.P.Fuchs** – Hans Peter Fuchs (1928–1999)
- **H.Pottinger** – Henry Pottinger (1789–1856)
- **H.Prat** – Henri Prat (1902–1981)
- **H.P.Wood** – Howard Page Wood (1924–2010)
- **H.Rainer** – Heimo Rainer (fl. 2001)
- **H.R.Fletcher** – Harold Roy Fletcher (1907–1978)
- **H.Rob.** – Harold E. Robinson (1932–2020)
- **H.Rock** – Howard Francis Leonard Rock (1925–1964)
- **H.Rosend.** – Henrik Viktor Rosendahl (1855–1918)
- **H.R.Sweet** – Herman Royden Sweet (1909–1992)
- **H.R.Wehrh.** – Heinrich Rudolf Wehrhahn (1887–1940) (not to be confused with Wilhelm Wehrhahn (1857–1926), author abbreviation Wehrh.)
- **H.Schaef.** – Hanno Schaefer (born 1975), also "Hanno Schäfer"
- **H.Schneid.** – Harald Schneider (born 1962)
- **H.Scholz** – Hildemar Wolfgang Scholz (1928–2012)
- **H.Schott** – Heinrich Schott (1759–1819) (not to be confused with botanist Heinrich Wilhelm Schott (1794–1865))
- **H.Sharsm.** – Helen Katherine Sharsmith (1905–1982)
- **H.Shaw** – Henry Shaw (1800–1889)
- **H.S.Holden** – Henry Smith Holden (1887–1963)
- **H.Sibth.** – Humphry Waldo Sibthorp (1713–1797)
- **H.S.Irwin** – Howard Samuel Irwin (1928–2019)
- **H.S.Kiu** – Hua Shing Kiu (born 1929)
- **H.S.Lo** – Hsien Shui Lo (born 1927)
- **H.Steedman** – Henry Steedman (1866–1953)
- **H.St.John** – Harold St. John (1892–1991)
- **H.Sun** – Hang Sun (born 1963)
- **H.T.Chang** – Ho Tseng Chang (born 1898)
- **H.T.Kenn.** – Helen T. Kennedy (fl. 2020)
- **H.Turner** – Hubert Turner (born 1955)
- **Hu** – Hsen Hsu Hu (1894–1968)
- **Hua** – Henri Hua (1861–1919)
- **Huamán** – Alexander Huamán Mera (fl. 2009)
- **Huber** – Jacques Huber (1867–1914)
- **Huds.** – William Hudson (1730–1793)
- **Hue** – Auguste-Marie Hue (1840–1917)
- **Hueber** – Francis Maurice Hueber (born 1929)
- **Huft** – Michael J. Huft (born 1949)
- **Hügel** – Karl Alexander Anselm von Hügel (1794–1870)
- **Hultén** – Oskar Eric Gunnar Hultén (1894–1981)
- **Humb.** – Alexander von Humboldt (1769–1859)
- **Humbert** – Jean-Henri Humbert (1887–1967)
- **Humblot** – Léon Humblot (1852–1914)
- **Hume** – Allan Octavian Hume (1829–1912)
- **Humphrey** – James Ellis Humphrey (1861–1897)
- **Humphries** – Christopher John Humphries (1947–2009)
- **Hung T.Chang** – Hung Ta Chang (1914–2016)
- **Hunt** – George Edward Hunt (1841–1873)
- **Hunter** – Alexander Hunter (1729–1809)
- **Hunz.** – Armando Theodoro Hunziker (1919–2001)
- **Hur.H.Sm.** – Huron Herbert Smith (1883–1933)
- **Hürl.** – Hans Hürlimann (1921–2014)
- **Hurus.** – Isao Hurusawa (1916–2001)
- **Hus** – Henri Theodore Antoine de Leng Hus (1876–1941)
- **Husn.** – Pierre Tranquille Husnot (1840–1929)
- **Husseinov** – Sch. A. Husseinov (born 1939)
- **Hussenot** – Louis Cincinnatus Sévérin Léon Hussenot (1809–1845)
- **Husson** – A. M. Husson (fl. 1952)
- **Hust.** – Friedrich Hustedt (1886–1968)
- **Husz** – Béla Husz (1892–1954)
- **Hutch.** – John Hutchinson (1884–1972)
- **Huter** – Rupert Huter (1834–1919)
- **Huth** – Ernst Huth (1845–1897)
- **Hutton** – William Hutton (1797–1860)
- **Huxley** – Anthony Julian Huxley (1920–1992)
- **H.V.Hansen** – Hans Vilhelm Hansen (born 1951)
- **H.Vilm.** – Charles Philippe Henry Lévêque de Vilmorin (1843–1899)
- **H.W.Clark** – Howard Walton Clark (1870–1941)
- **H.Wendl.** – Hermann Wendland (1825–1903)
- **H.Whitehouse** – Harold Leslie Keer Whitehouse (1917–2000)
- **H.Whittier** – Henry O. Whittier (1937–2008)
- **H.W.Kurz** – Holger Willibald Kurz (born 1952)
- **H.W.Li** – Hsi Wen Li (1931–2021)
- **H.W.Sarg.** – Henry Winthrop Sargent (1810–1882)
- **H.Wulff** – Heinz Diedrich Wulff (1910–1983)
- **Hyl.** – Nils Hylander (1904–1970)
- **Hynn.** – Tynjuh Mawbor Hynniewta (1949–2019)
- **H.Y.Su** – Ho Yi Su (born 1937)
- **H.Z.Tian** – Huai Zhen Tian (fl. 2008)

== I–Z ==
Contents: Top	A	B	C	D	E F	G	H	I J	K L	M	N O	P	Q R	S	T U V	W X Y Z

To find entries for I–Z, use the table of contents above.

== See also ==
- List of South African plant botanical authors
- List of botanists
- Category:Botanists
- List of Russian botanists
- List of zoologists by author abbreviation
