= Van Hall =

Van Hall is a Dutch toponymic surname meaning "from/of Hall". This indicates an origin in either the town Hall in Brummen or Halle in Bronckhorst, both in Gelderland. Currently, the form Van Hal is more common. The people with this name listed below all are descendants of Floris Adriaan van Hall (1736–1808), whose family originated in Hall, Brummen:

- Floris Adriaan van Hall (1791–1866), Dutch statesman, twice Prime Minister of the Netherlands
- Gijs van Hall (1904–1977), Dutch politician and Mayor of Amsterdam
- Jacob van Hall (1799–1859), Dutch jurist
- Maurits van Hall (1836–1900), Dutch lawyer, banker, and politician
- Suzy van Hall (1907–1978), Dutch dancer and resistance member
- Walraven van Hall (1906–1945), Dutch banker and World War II resistance leader

== See also ==
- Van Hall Instituut, agricultural college named after Herman Christiaan van Hall (1801–1874), Dutch botanist and agronomist
- Van Hall Larenstein, vocational university formed via a merger of the Van Hall Instituut and IAH Larenstein
