= Gerharda Wilbrink =

Plant pathologist

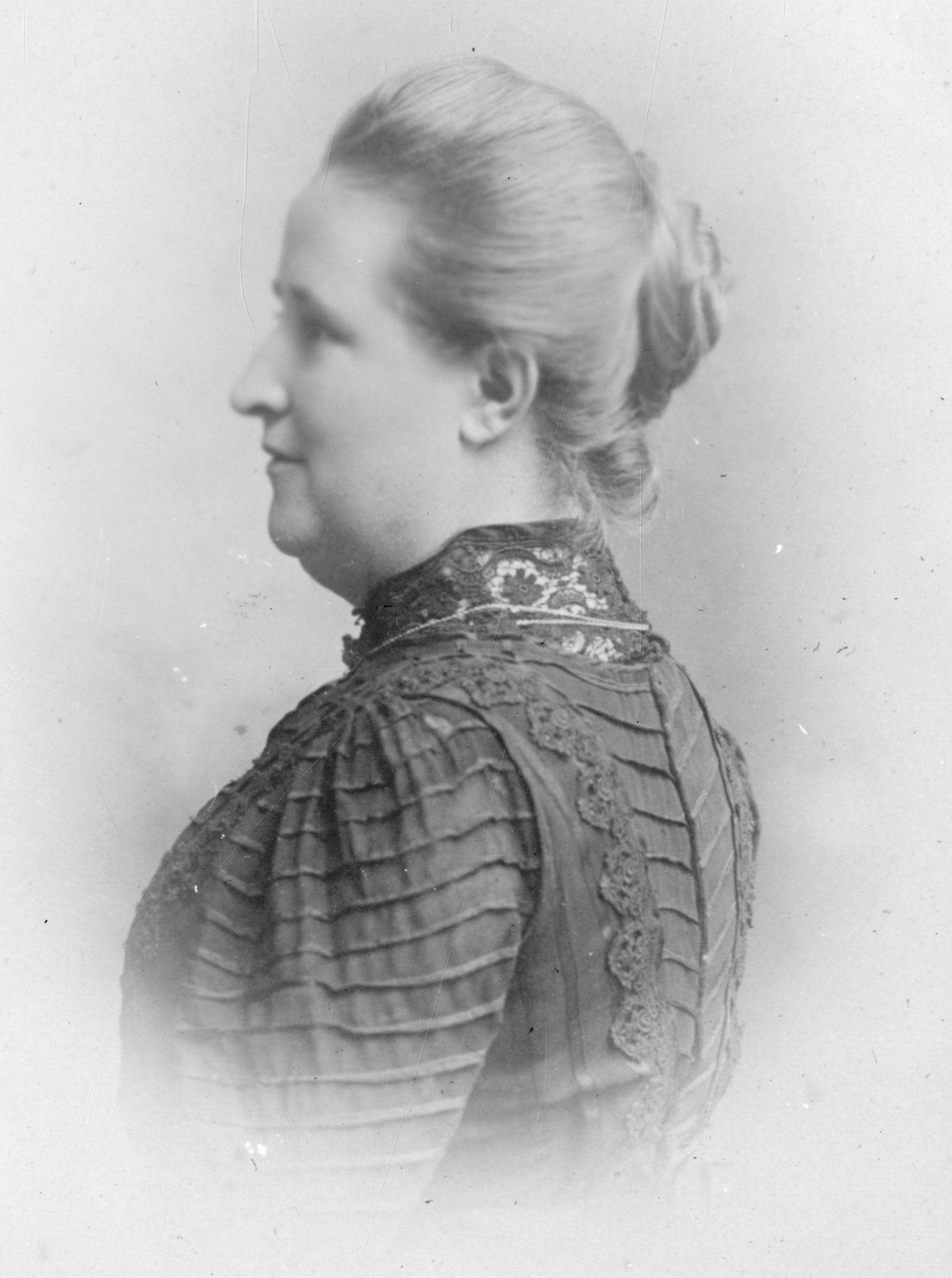
- Born: July 19, 1875; Lunteren, the Netherlands
- Died: January 17, 1962 (aged 86)
- Occupations: Plant pathologist Agronomist

Gerharda Wilbrink (19 July 1875 – 17 January 1962) was a Dutch plant pathologist and agronomist who worked in the Dutch East Indies. She contributed to developing disease resistant sugarcane varieties. A medium for growing Xanthomonas and other plant bacteria is known as Wilbrink's Agar.

== Biography ==
=== Early life and education ===
Wilbrink was born in Lunteren. She studied biology and joined the University of Utrecht where she became the first woman biologist to take up a position in Java in 1903.

=== Research ===
Her early work was on the indigo plant and in 1905 she began to work in the experimental station of the Javan sugar industry in Pekalongan. She moved to Pasoeroean in 1907 and was involved in studies on the diseases of sugarcane, particularly the sereh disease. She was involved in producing sereh-resistant hybrids and clones and it was discovered that the disease did not infect cane above a certain altitude. She took leave from 1912 to 1913 and returned to the experimental station in Cheribon where she worked on the isolation of a bacteria that cause leaf scald disease. She used a medium for Xanthomonas bacteria which is now known as Wilbrink's Agar consisting of peptone 5g, sucrose 20g KH_{2}PO_{4} 0.5 g, MgSO_{4} (hydrated) 0.25 g, agar 15g, distilled water 1 L and adjusted to a pH of 7. She discovered a hot water treatment that helped remove sereh virus infection from setts prior to planting. Setts treated in 52-55 °C water for 30 minutes helped remove the disease agent. She found another viral mosaic virus and identified its vector as an aphid. For her work she received an honorary doctorate from the University of Utrecht in 1923. In 1925 she went on a tour of sugarcane producing areas. Jacob Jeswiet used one of her sugarcane clones (POJ2364) in breeding high-yielding sugarcane - POJ2878 - which spread worldwide.

=== Later career ===
From 1926 she became a director of the Cheribon station. She left Java in 1932 and settled in Lunteren. She served as a board member of the Willie Commelin Scholten Phytopathology Laboratory until 1956.
