= Helen Brown =

Helen Brown may refer to:

- Helen Agcaoili Summers Brown (1915–2011), Filipino-American teacher, librarian, and founder of the Pilipino American Reading Room and Library
- Helen Brown (artist) (1917–1986), New Zealand artist
- Helen Brown (author) (born 1954), New Zealand author
- Helen Evans Brown (1904–1964), American food writer and cookbook author
- Helen Gurley Brown (1922–2012), American author, publisher, and businesswoman
- Helen Hayes (née Brown, 1900–1993), American actress
- Helen Jean Brown (1903–1982), American botanist and phycologist
- Helen Gilman Brown (1867–1942), American philanthropist
- Helen Lawrenson (1907–1982), American writer, born Helen Strough Brown
- Helen McElhone, née Brown (1933–2013), Scottish politician
- Helen Paxton Brown (1876–1956), Scottish artist
- Helen Shaw (politician) (1879–1964), Scottish politician, born Helen Brown Shaw
- Phyllis Fraser (1916–2006), American actress, journalist, and children's book publisher, born Helen Brown Nichols
