= Ritzema =

Ritzema is a surname. Notable people with the surname include:

- Jan Ritzema Bos (1850–1928), Dutch plant pathologist
- Wayne Ritzema (born 1975), English cricketer
- Rudolphus Ritzema (1739–1803), American officer during the American Revolutionary War
