= Houtzager =

Houtzager is a Dutch surname. Notable people with the surname include:

- Hans Houtzager (1910–1993), Dutch hammer thrower
- Marc Houtzager (born 1971), Dutch equestrian

== See also ==
- Gijsbertus Houtzagers (1888–1957), Dutch botanist
