= Sugarcane sereh disease =

Disease of sugarcane

Sugarcane sereh disease was a disease of sugarcane reported from Indonesia in the 19th century Dutch colonial plantations. It has been suggested that it was caused by a phytoplasma or a virus. The name sereh disease is derived from the resemblance of infected cane (Saccharum officinarum) to lemon grass (Cymbopogon citratus) which is known as sereh. Gerharda Wilbrink discovered that heat treatment of the planting material at 45°C for half an hour made the material disease free.

Sereh was first reported in the 1880s in the Dutch sugar plantations in Indonesia. It was around the time that a variety of cane called Black Cheribon had been introduced and it was susceptible to the disease. The plantations went into a crisis due to the disease and the director of the experimental station at Semarang known as Midden Java, Dr F. Soltwedel, conducted experiments and discovered that the cane was unaffected at higher altitudes and nurseries were maintained at a height and planting was done in the plains. This was a bit expensive but they also bred some resistant crossed varieties of sugarcane. Soltwedel died in 1889. Further crossing to obtain sereh resistant varieties were begun in 1893 by Jan Hendrik Wakker who crossed Kassoer (thought to be a hybrid of S. officinarum with S. spontaneum) with noble sugar cane S. officinarum. In 1895 Jan Derk Kobus imported the Indian variety Chunnee and crossed them with S. officinarum and obtained clones that were resistant to sereh but susceptible to a viral mosaic. Gerharda Wilbrink also conducted crosses and produced various resistant clones including POJ2364. This was then crossed by J. Jeswiet to produce POJ2878, the so-called Javan Wondercane that had high sugar yield and disease resistance.
