= Hegde =

Hegde (IPA: [heɡɖe]) or Heggade Pergade is a common surname found primarily in the Kanara, Tulu Nadu and Konkan regions of India. It is prevalent among various Hindu communities in these regions, including the Kuruba, Bunt, Saraswat Brahmins, Kannada Jain, Havyaka Brahmin, and Vokkaliga communities of Karnataka.

== Etymology ==
The word Hegde is derived from the Old Kannada word Pergade which means chiefman or Headman of the village.

== History and Evolution ==
The word originated as a title or rank in the Alupa dynasty of Tulunadu, Emperors. Local chiefs who held administrative positions such as village headmen and superintendents were awarded the title of heggaḍe, which over time, became hereditary and evolved into a surname. Other similar titles included pergaḍe, hergaḍe, nadabova, nalagamiga, prabhu, and gavunda. The Western Ganga kings also had officials known as manepergade and Sunka vergades.

Local chiefs across Āluvakheda were known by different titles such as arasu, dore, ballāḷa, heggaḍe, and vergaḍe. The heggades were local chieftains who held small principalities in the Āluvakheda region of medieval Karnataka. They often engaged in armed conflicts with each other, which were resolved through intervention by higher authorities. Some heggades became independent rulers after the fall of the Vijayanagar Empire and European imperialism. For example, the Vitla principality was ruled by the Domba Heggade dynasty until the 20th century. The heggades followed matrilineal succession, passing the title to the present title-bearer's sister's son. Ravivarma Heggade, the last ruler of Vitla, allied with the British against Mysore in the First and Second Anglo-Mysore Wars but regretted it when the British reduced his political power. He led a failed revolt to regain his hereditary throne and was hanged in 1800, along with eight other members of his family and court.

The Heggade, has its origins in the title of heggaḍe, which was equivalent to the guttedāra, a semi-feudal landlord who owned vast tracts of lands and collected revenue on behalf of the State. The lands owned by the Heggades were leased out to tenants who cultivated food and cash crops, paying a portion of the produce as tax to the State. The remaining share of the produce would be kept by the landholder. The Heggades were also associated with bhūta worship and religious administration of shrines and temples. Today, the Heggade at Dharmasthala is a celebrated public figure and philanthropist who is a great patron of arts and culture in coastal Karnataka. Some of the Heggades were patrons of traditional Kannada fine arts such as music and dance.

The surname is also associated with the Havyaka Brahmins, who settled in Karnataka and assimilated into the Kannada population, and some Tulu Bunts who financially back and promote Yakshagana shows.

== Notable people ==
The following is a list of notable people with last name Hegde.

=== Film Industry ===
- Ganesh Hegde, choreographer
- Latha Hegde, Indian actress
- Pakhi Hegde, Indian actress
- Pooja Hegde, Indian model and actress
- Samyuktha Hegde, Indian actress
- Sanjith Hegde, Indian singer and songwriter
- Satya Hegde, cinematographer
- Senna Hegde, Indian director

=== Politicians ===
- Anantkumar Hegde, Indian politician
- K. Jayaprakash Hegde, Indian politician
- K. S. Hegde (1909–1990), former Speaker of the Lok Sabha
- Ramakrishna Hegde, Indian politician
- Vishweshwar Hegde Kageri, Indian politician

=== Officials ===
- Jagannathrao Hegde, former Sheriff of Mumbai
- N. Santosh Hegde, former justice of the Supreme Court Of India
- Sanjay Hegde, senior advocate at the Supreme Court of India

=== Authors and artists ===
- Belle Monappa Hegde, Indian medical scientist, educationist and author
- Jyoti Hegde, musician
- Keremane Shivarama Hegde (1938–2009), Yakshagana artist
- Pandit Parameshwar Hegde, Hindustani Classical Musician

=== Others ===
- Panduranga Hegde, environmentalist
- R. K. Hegde (1931–1991), Indian plant pathologist
- Sukesh Hegde, Kabaddi player
- Veerendra Heggade, The Dharmadhikari of Dharmasthala Temple
- V. G. Siddhartha Hegde (1959–2019), entrepreneur
