= Haynie =

Haynie is a surname. Notable people with the surname include:

- Aubrey Haynie (born 1974), American bluegrass musician
- Charles Haynie (1935–2001), faculty member at SUNY in Buffalo, New York, U.S.
- Dave Haynie (born 1961), former Commodore International chief engineer
- Hugh Haynie (1927–1999), American political cartoonist
- Isham N. Haynie (1824–1868), Union Army officer during the American Civil War
- Kristin Haynie (born 1983), American basketball player in the WNBA
- Nellie Violet Haynie (1886–1980), American botanist
- Sandra Haynie (born 1943), American professional golfer
