= Hagara =

Hagara (Slovak feminine: Hagarová) is a surname. Notable people with the surname include:

- Adam Hagara (born 2006), Slovak figure skater
- Andreas Hagara (born 1964), Austrian yacht racer
- Ladislav Hagara (born 1944), Slovak mycologist and author
- Ľubomír Hagara (born 1985), Slovak sprint canoeist
- Roman Hagara (born 1966), Austrian sailor
- Vladimír Hagara (1943–2015), Slovak footballer
- Willy Hagara (1927–2015), Austrian singer and actor
- Zuzana Hagarová (born 1977), Slovak chess player
