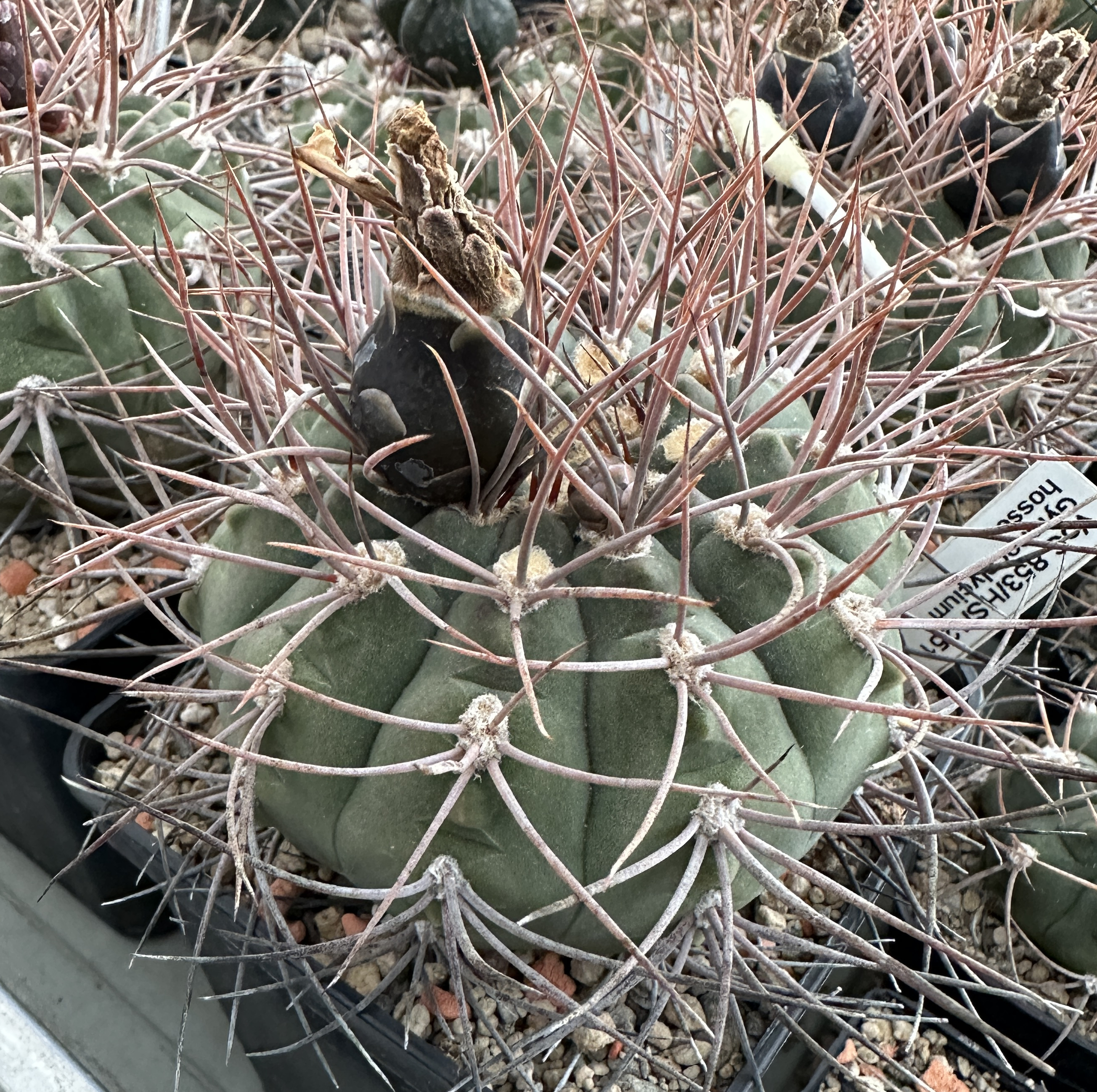

Conservation status
- Least Concern (IUCN 3.1)

Scientific classification
- Kingdom: Plantae
- Clade: Tracheophytes
- Clade: Angiosperms
- Clade: Eudicots
- Order: Caryophyllales
- Family: Cactaceae
- Subfamily: Cactoideae
- Genus: Gymnocalycium
- Species: G. hossei

Binomial name
- Gymnocalycium hossei (Haage) A.Berger 1929

Synonyms
- Echinocactus hossei F.Haage 1927

= Gymnocalycium hossei =

Species of cactus

Gymnocalycium hossei is a species of cactus in the genus Gymnocalycium, endemic to Bolivia.

== Description ==
Gymnocalycium hossei typically grows as a solitary cactus, featuring gray-green to bluish-green, flattened spherical shoots that can reach heights of up to 9 centimeters and diameters of 20 centimeters. The cactus has 13 to 19 relatively wide ribs. Its single central spine turns gray as it ages, while the seven to nine radial spines, which are initially brown and bent backward, also turn gray over time and develop darker tips. These spines can grow up to 1.5 centimeters in length, with one pointing downward and the others extending sideways. The flowers of Gymnocalycium hossei range from whitish to reddish-pink, occasionally having a slight brown tint, and feature a short flower tube.

=== Subspecies ===
Accepted subspecies:

Image	Scientific name	Distribution
	Gymnocalycium hossei subsp. ferrarii (Rausch) Lodé	Argentina (Catamarca)
	Gymnocalycium hossei subsp. hossei	Argentina (Córdoba, La Rioja)

== Distribution and habitat ==
This species is found in steep grassy slopes in the Argentinian provinces of Catamarca and La Rioja, typically at altitudes between 50 and 1900 meters.

== Taxonomy ==
Gymnocalycium hossei was first described as Echinocactus hossei in 1927 by Friedrich Adolph Haage in the 105th volume of the cactus price list published by F. A. Haage junior in Erfurt. Two years later, Alwin Berger reclassified the species into the genus Gymnocalycium. The specific name "hossei" honors the German botanist Carl Curt Hosseus.
