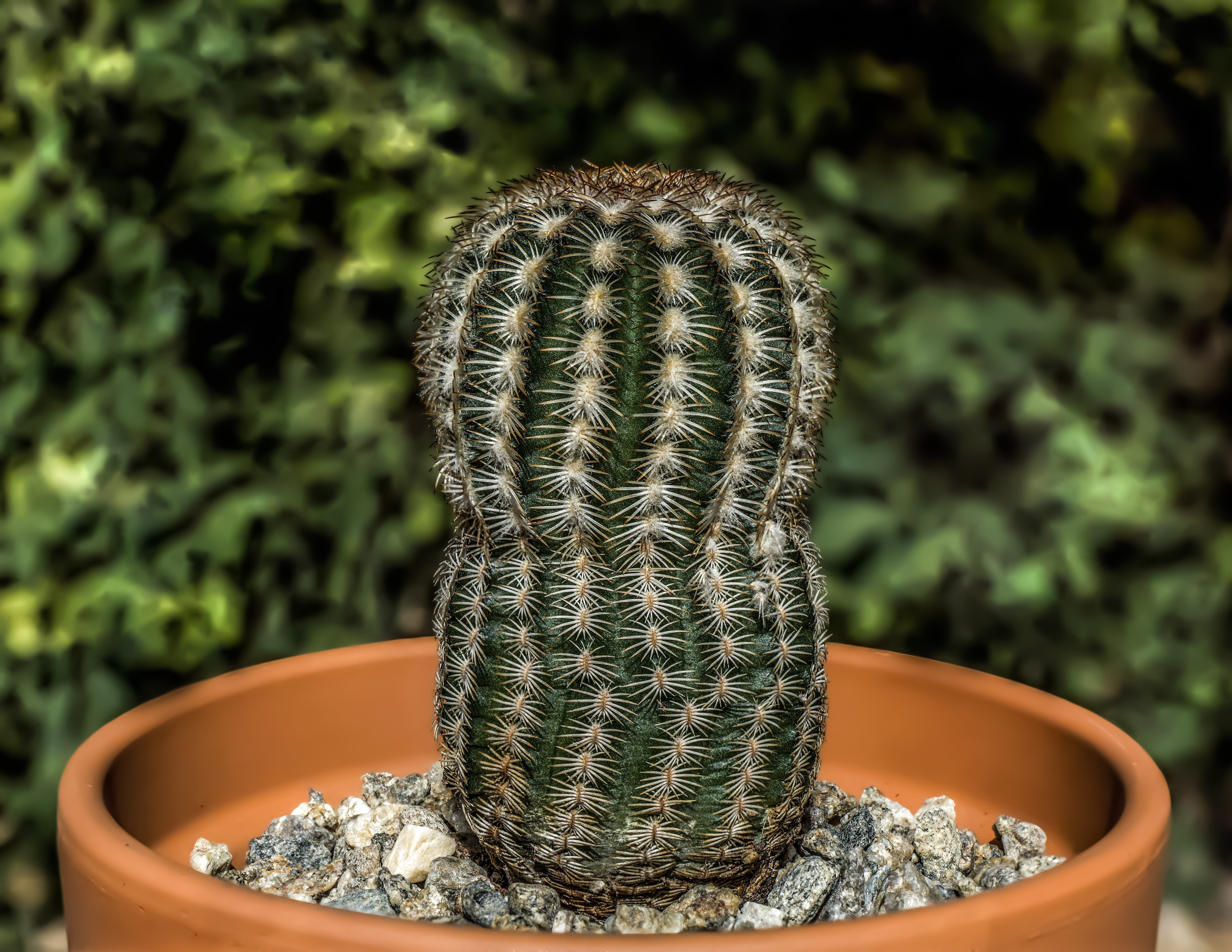
- var. reichenbachii

Conservation status
- Secure (NatureServe)

Scientific classification
- Kingdom: Plantae
- Clade: Tracheophytes
- Clade: Angiosperms
- Clade: Eudicots
- Order: Caryophyllales
- Family: Cactaceae
- Subfamily: Cactoideae
- Genus: Echinocereus
- Species: E. reichenbachii

Binomial name
- Echinocereus reichenbachii (Terscheck ex Walp.) Haage

Synonyms
- Echinocactus reichenbachii Terscheck; Echinopsis pectinata var. reichenbachii (Terscheck) Salm-Dyck

= Echinocereus reichenbachii =

Species of cactus

Echinocereus reichenbachii (commonly known as lace or hedgehog cactus) is a perennial plant and shrub in the cactus family. The species is native to the Chihuahuan Desert and parts of northern Mexico and the southern United States, where they grow at elevations up to 1,500 meters (4,900 ft). This cactus earned the Royal Horticultural Society's Award of Garden Merit.

== Description ==
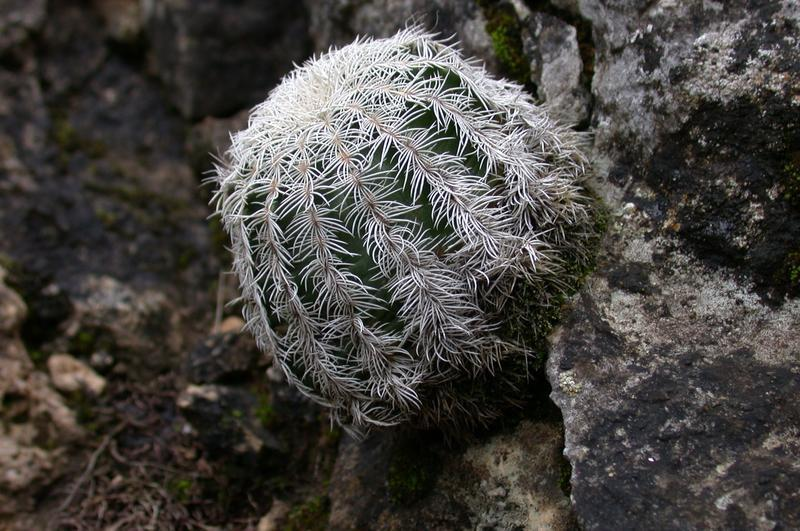
E. reichenbachii

Echinocereus reichenbachii is a perennial plant and shrub. It is one of the smaller Echinocereus species. Immature specimens are spherical, and as they grow they become cylindrical. Plants are solitary or multi-branched in clusters of as many as twelve, with erect stems with 10 to 19 slightly undulate ribs. They reach 7.5 to 30 centimetres (3.0 to 11.8 in) tall and 4 to 10 centimetres (1.6 to 3.9 in) wide. The stems are dark green and obscured by the spines, especially when the plant is dehydrated. Areoles are elliptical or oval. They are spaced 1 to 6 millimetres (0.039 to 0.236 in) apart, with 15 to 36 spines each. The spines are tan, to brown, black, purplish black, or pink, and the tips are usually darker than the shaft. The central spines tend to be the darkest. There are up to 7 central spines per areole; they are 1 to 6 millimetres (0.039 to 0.236 in) long.

Plants flower in early May and late June, and they fruit 6 to 10 weeks after flowering. Flowers open for just one day, but anthesis is usually staggered so plants have blooming flowers for a full week; buds are covered in white wool that hides the fruit as it develops. The purple or pink flowers bloom in early May to late June, growing to approximately 4.5 to 8 centimetres (1.8 to 3.1 in) by 5 to 10 centimetres (2.0 to 3.9 in). The flower's inner tepals are silvery pink or magenta; the outer portions are white, crimson, green, or multicolored. They are approximately 4.5 to 8 centimetres (1.8 to 3.1 in) by 5 to 10 centimetres (2.0 to 3.9 in), and the flower tubes are 22 to 40 millimetres (0.87 to 1.57 in) by 10 to 30 millimetres (0.39 to 1.18 in). The tube hairs are 5 to 15 millimetres (0.20 to 0.59 in) long, and the nectar chamber is 2 to 5 millimetres (0.079 to 0.197 in) deep. Flowers have 30 to 50 petals each, which are ragged or notched. Pistils are multi-lobed and green, and stamens are cream-colored or yellow. Fruits are various shades of green and 15 to 28 millimetres (0.59 to 1.10 in) long.

== Subspecies ==
Variations of Echinocereus reichenbachii include:

Image	Scientific name	Description	Distribution
	Echinocereus reichenbachii subsp. albertii (L.D.Benson) Pilbeam	Commonly called the Black Lace cactus. It has been listed as endangered since 1979. Populations of E. reichenbachii var. albertii are found near the Kleberg, Jim Wells, and Refugio counties of south Texas. Destruction of habitat, over-collecting, and livestock grazing have all contributed to its endangered status.	Texas
	Echinocereus reichenbachii subsp. armatus (Poselg.) N.P.Taylor		Mexico (Nuevo León)
	Echinocereus reichenbachii subsp. baileyi (Rose) N.P.Taylor		S. Oklahoma to N. Texas
	Echinocereus reichenbachii subsp. burrensis G.Frank, Metorn & E.Scherer		Mexico (N. Coahuila)
	Echinocereus reichenbachii subsp. fitchii (Britton & Rose) N.P.Taylor		S. Texas to NE. Mexico (N. Nuevo León, N. Tamaulipas)
	Echinocereus reichenbachii subsp. perbellus (Britton & Rose) N.P.Taylor		SE. Colorado to NW. Texas
	Echinocereus reichenbachii subsp. reichenbachii		SW. Kansas to Central Texas and NE. Mexico

== Distribution ==
E. reichenbachii's native habitat includes the entirety of the Chihuahuan Desert and its nearby grasslands, as well as in woodlands of oak and juniper. They grown at elevations up to 1,500 meters (4,900 ft). In the United States, E. reichenbachii is native to Texas, New Mexico, Colorado, and Nebraska. They are also found in Kansas and Oklahoma. E. reichenbachii are cold and heat tolerant, and prefer dry, well-drained soils near rock outcroppings. The variety found in Oklahoma, E. reichenbachii baileyi, have especially long "bristlelike" spines. E. reichenbachii is native to the northern Mexican states of Coahuila, Nuevo León, and Tamaulipas.

== Taxonomy ==
The scientific name, Echinocereus, comes from the Greek ekhinos, meaning hedgehog, and cereus, the Latin term for wax paper. The specific epithet honors the German botanist Ludwig Reichenbach. Common names include Lace hedgehog cactus, Lace cactus, Lace hedgehog, Purple candle, and Órgano-pequeño de colores.

In 1843, German botanist Carl Adolf Terscheck named a specimen of cactus collected in Mexico Echinocactus reichenbachii, but his description was incomplete and proved unhelpful to later scholars. During the years 1848 to 1856, George Engelmann made extensive studies of a plant he named Echinocereus caespitosus. Prior to this Joseph zu Salm-Reifferscheidt-Dyck referred to plants in European collections as Echinopsis pectinate var. reichenbachiana, and he later discussed the possibility with Engelmann that these two plants were one and the same.

Despite the early indication of a naming error, Engelmann's binomial was used to describe the plant until 1893, when F.A. Haage Jr. changed Terscheck's Echinocactus reichenbachii to Echinocereus reichenbachii, which Nathaniel Lord Britton and Joseph Nelson Rose later adopted. This broke with the long-standing botanical tradition to use the earliest known name, but because Terscheck's description was lacking and possibly referred to as many as a dozen species, his binomial was supplanted by Haage's.

== Cultivation and propagation ==
E. reichenbachii prefer full sun and require little water. They thrive in dry, well-drained, gravelly, clay, and loam soils, and near rock outcroppings. They are cold and heat tolerant, and grow well under glass. They are drought resistant, but susceptible to mealybugs and scale insects.

Propagation is facilitated by seeds collected as the fruits begin to dry. The species is used in commercial landscaping as ornamental features, particularly in desert environments. Plants are considered deer resistant. E. reichenbachii earned the Royal Horticultural Society's Award of Garden Merit.

== Gallery ==
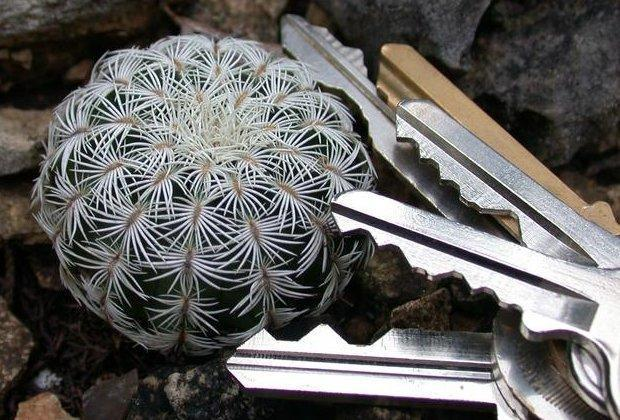
Echinocereus reichenbachii

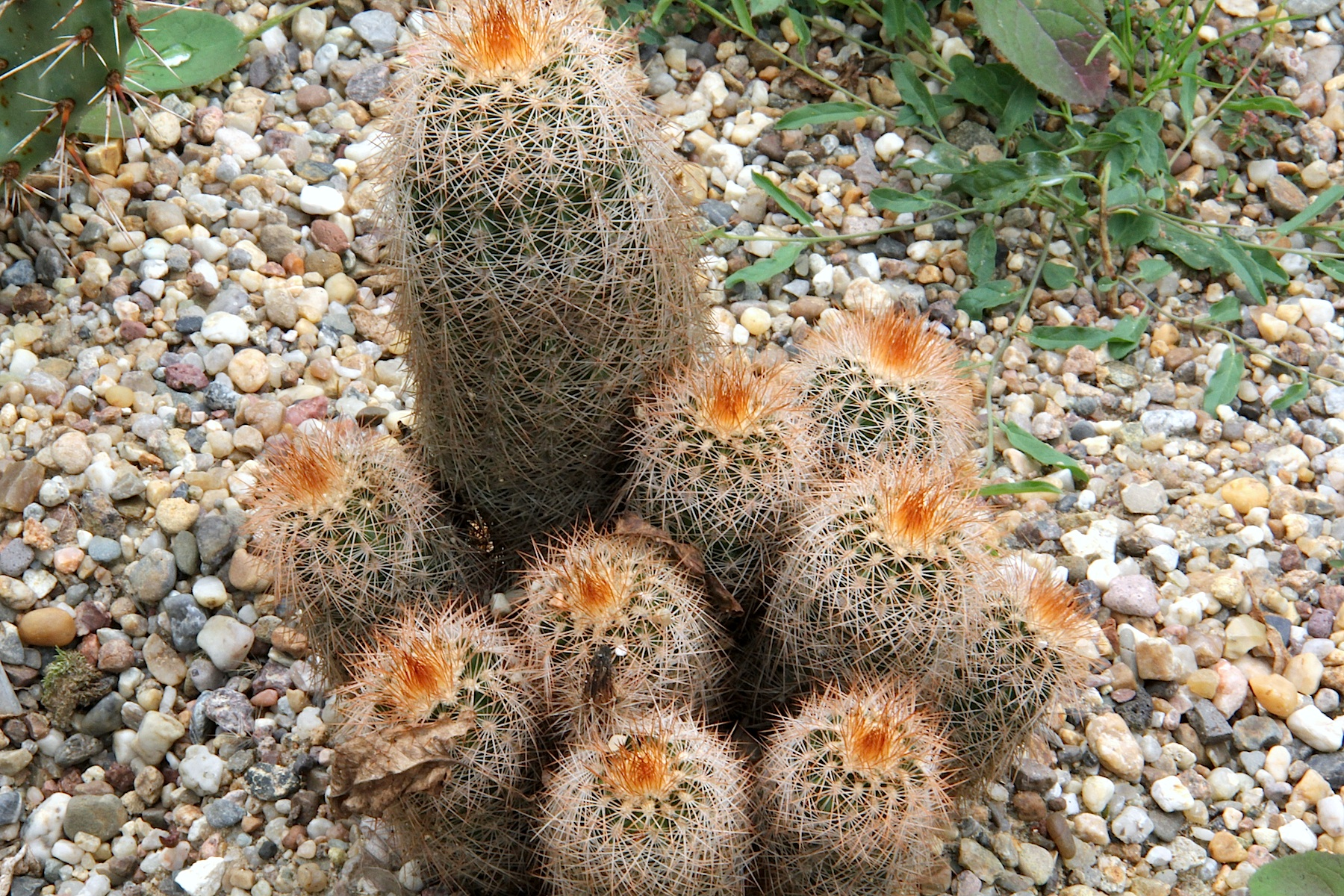
E. reichenbachii var. baileyi

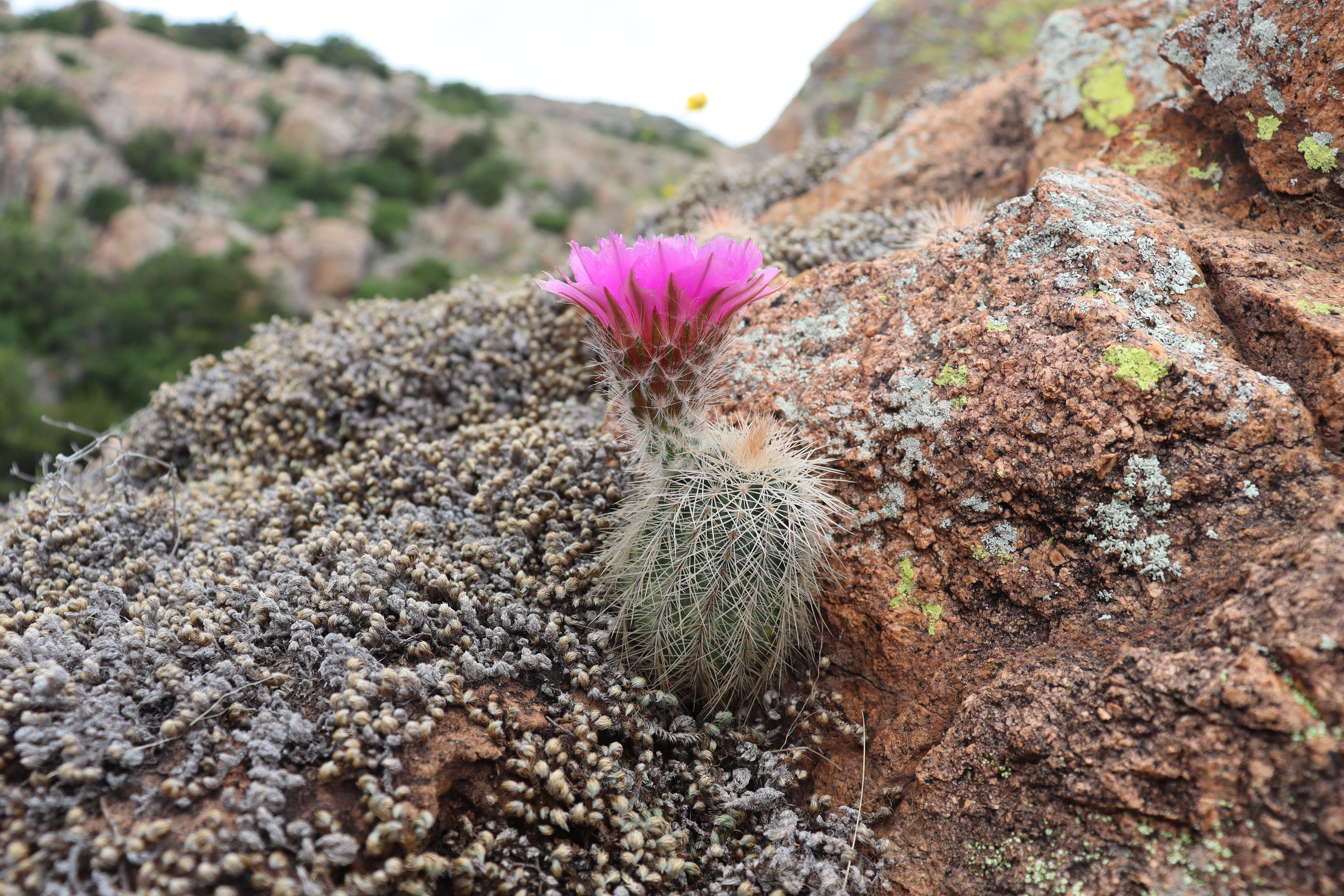
E. reichenbachii var. baileyi in the Wichita Mountains
