= Jan Ritzema Bos =

Dutch botanist (1850–1928)

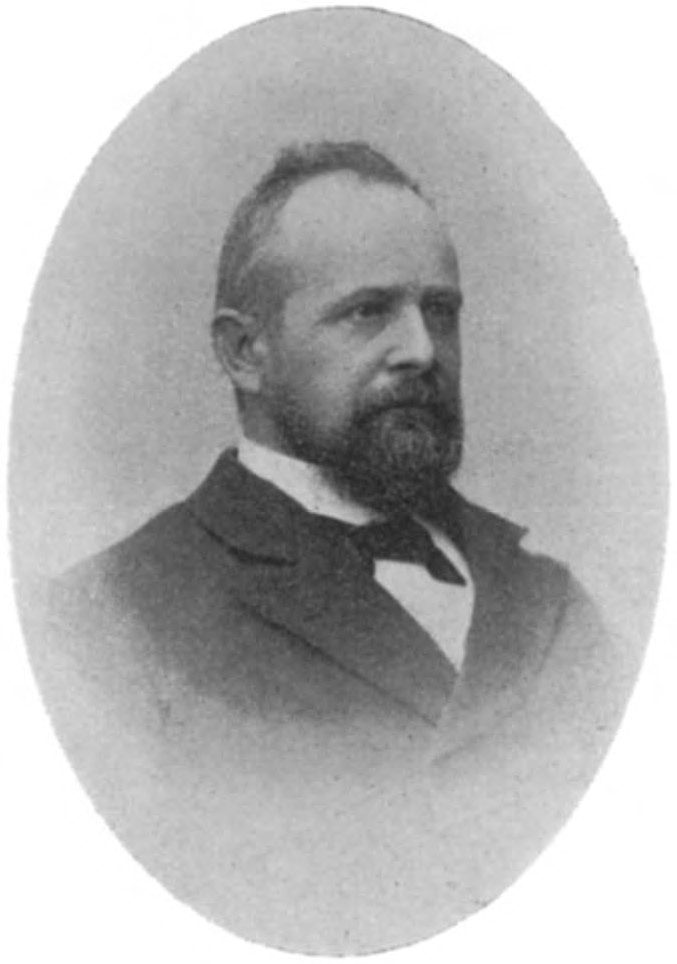
- Born: July 25, 1850; Groningen, Netherlands
- Died: April 7, 1928 (aged 77); Wageningen, Netherlands

Jan Ritzema Bos (25 July 1850, in Groningen – 7 April 1928, in Wageningen) was a Dutch plant pathologist and zoologist. He served as the first director of the Willie Commelin Scholten Foundation and founder of the Plant Protection Service in 1899 in Amsterdam. Bos described several species of plant nematode.

== Life and work ==
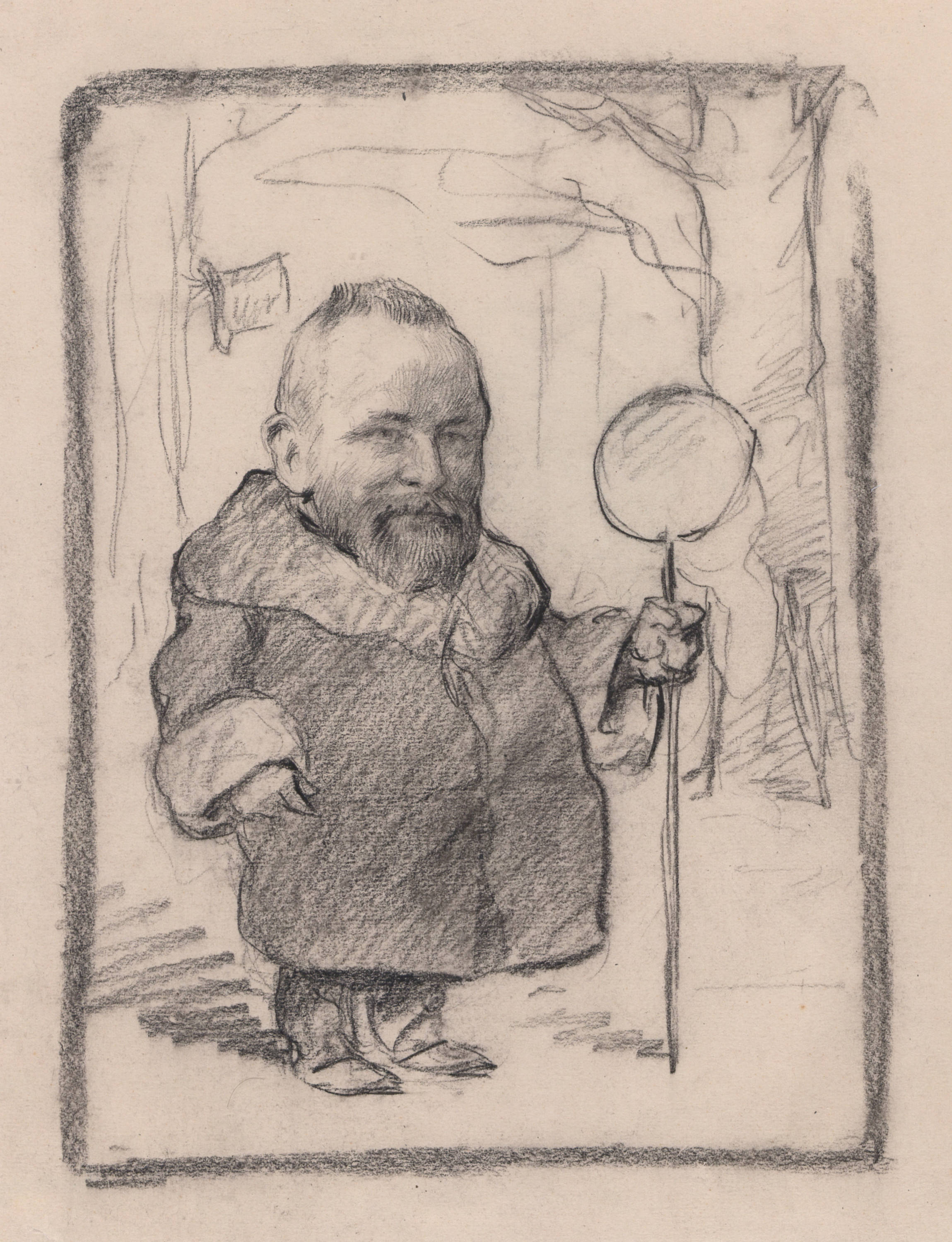
Caricature by Louis Raemaekers

Bos was the son of teacher for the deaf and dumb Pieter Pieters Bos (1812-1891) and Geessien Jans Ritzema (1823-1903), and was named after his grandfather Jan Ritzema. His brother was Hemmo Bos, author and lecturer at the agricultural college in Wageningen. He went to study zoology at the University of Groningen in 1868 and received a doctorate with work under H.C. van Hall and M. Salverda in 1874. He then became a teacher at the Rural Economics School in Groningen which became an agricultural school in 1870. The school closed down in 1871 and Bos moved to Warffum where he began to study plant diseases. His advisor professor Salverda left Groningen in 1872 and became an inspector for agricultural schools. He recommended Bos for the school in Wageningen. Bos moved here in 1873 and began to work first on establishing an insect collection. He carried out application-oriented research and was nominated as Director of the newly founded Willie Commelin Scholten 'Institute of Phytopathology' (subsequently re-named the Phytopathological Service) at Wageningen. In 1895 he became director of the Here Ritzema-Bos continued with the 'Plant Protection Service', the Netherlands Society of Plant Pathology and the 'Tijdschrift over Plantenziekten' which later became The Netherlands Journal of Plant Pathology and in 1994 was continued as the European Journal of Plant Pathology, published under the aegis of the European Foundation for Plant Pathology. He took a special interest in the protection of insectivorous birds and was a supporter of the Useful Animals Act of 1880. He was succeeded by Johanna Westerdijk (1883-1961) as the new director of the WCS-Laboratory in 1906.

== Books ==
- Nederlandsche Planten - Th. Nieuwenhuis, L. Klaver & Dr.J. Ritzema Bos - 55 loose lithographed plates (S.L. van Looy, Amsterdam 1905) OCLC 34878273 (all editions)
- Tierische Schädlinge und Nützlinge für Ackerbau, Viehzucht, Wald- und Gartenbau; Lebensformen, Vorkommen, Einfluß und die Maßregeln zu Vertilgung und Schutz. Praktisches Handbuch - Jan Ritzema Bos (Berlin, Paul Parey, 1891)
