= Hirmer Publishers =

German art book publishing house

- Founded: 1948
- Founder: Max Hirmer
- Country of origin: Germany
- Headquarters location: Munich
- Distribution: KNV Zeitfracht GmbH (Germany; German books in Europe, Asia, Africa, Australasia, South America); Thames & Hudson (English books in Europe, Asia, Africa, Australasia, South America); Casemate Publishers (German books in US); Chicago Distribution Center (English books in US)
- Publication types: Books
- Nonfiction topics: Art
- Owner: Dirk Ippen
- Official website: www.hirmerverlag.de/uk/

Hirmer Publishers is the name used by Hirmer Verlag, a German art book publishing house based in Munich, for its operations in the English-speaking world.

== Publishing history ==
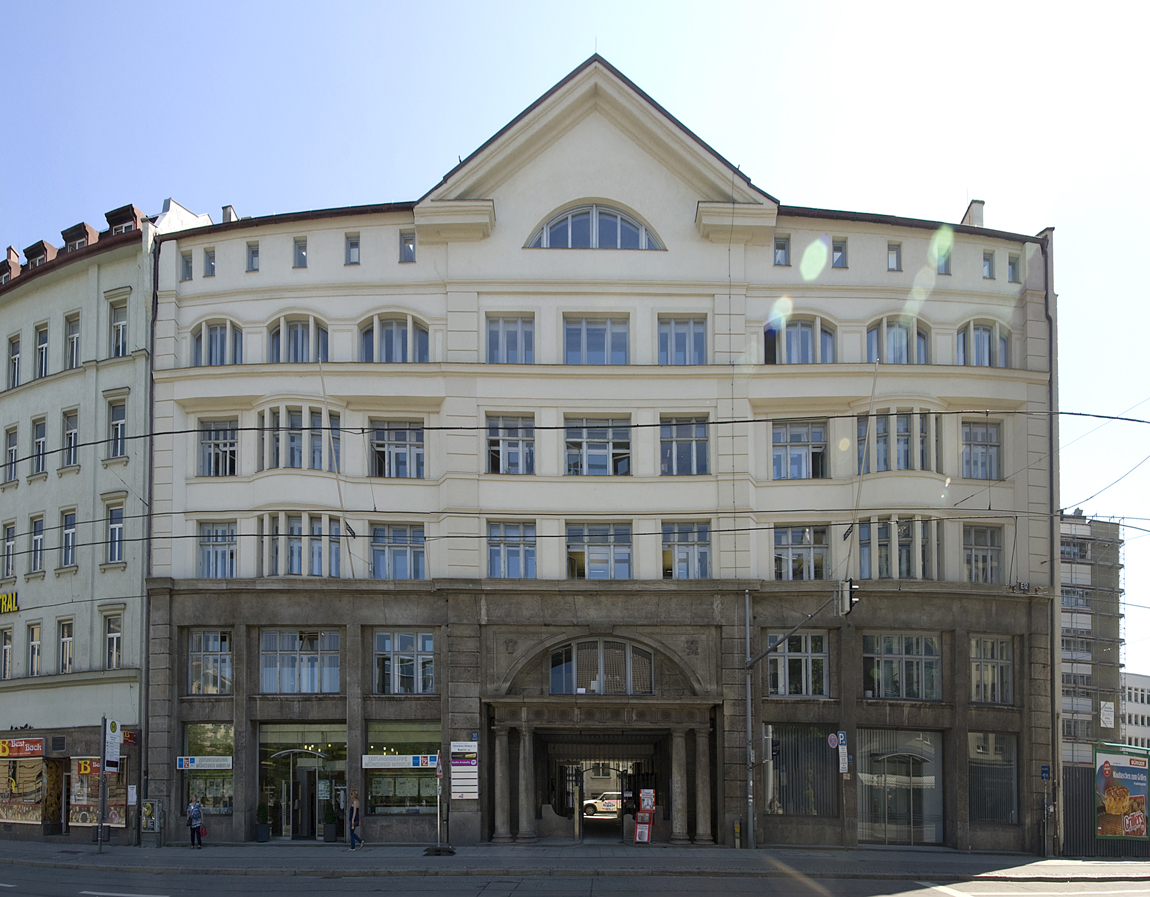
Seat of Hirmer Publishers in Munich, Germany

The publishing house was founded in 1948 by Max Hirmer and his wife Aenne. Since 1952 it has been called Hirmer Verlag and began publishing books in the 1950s. After Max Hirmer retirement, his son Albert Hirmer took over the management of the publishing house. Since 2011 the publishing house belongs to the newspaper publisher Dirk Ippen. Thomas Zuhr (1960–2024) was managing director from 2009 to 2024. The management has been with Kerstin Ludolph since 2024. Hirmer Publishers with its headquarters in Munich (Germany) ranks among the most prestigious publishers of art books.

== Publishing program ==
The subjects of Hirmer books span a wide range of areas from painting, photography, architecture, sculpture, drawing, to fashion, and the history of culture and include series of academic publications as well as extensive catalogues raisonnés. In recent years, Hirmer Publishers has increasingly turned its focus to contemporary art, without neglecting its traditional roots in fields such as archaeology and the decorative arts.

Exhibition catalogues are also part of the publisher's program as well as authors' books, which are often prepared over a period of years and then developed and produced in-house. In addition, is the regular appearance of the Hirmer collector's editions: original works, which are numbered, signed, and published in strictly limited editions.

== International art ==
The majority of the publications are in German, but more than 200 English-language titles are available. The publishing house cooperates with Thames & Hudson and the University of Chicago Press.

== Awards ==
In 2018, Hirmer Publishers was awarded with the Goldene Letter, the highest award of the international competition for the most beautiful books from all over the world, for Heimat, Handwerk und die Utopie des Alltäglichen. Schönste Bücher aus aller Welt.
