= Max Hirmer =

Max Hirmer (14 April 1893 in Straubing – 17 April 1981) was a German botanist, publisher and photographer.

Hirmer was born on 14 April 1893 in Straubing. After graduating from the Wilhelmsgymnasium in Munich in 1913, he studied archaeology, art history and natural sciences. Hirmer received his doctorate from the Ludwig-Maximilians-Universität München in 1917 and his habilitation in 1922. He was an adjunct professor at the Ludwig-Maximilians-Universität München from 1928 but was dismissed by the Nazis in 1936 for political reasons. Hirmer died on 17 April 1981, 88 years old.

Hirmer wrote a number of works of botany including a book and many articles on phyllotaxis.

As a photographer, Hirmer worked mainly in the field of art and archaeology. In 1948, he, together with his wife Aenne (1912–2017), founded the Gesellschaft für wissenschaftliches Lichtbild, or Society for the Scientific Photographic Image. This became the Hirmer-Verlag publishing house, which published numerous art studies and illustrated books. Hirmer's own books published with the firm included Ägypten. Architektur, Plastik, Malerei in drei Jahrtausenden (Egypt: Three Millennia of Architecture, Sculpture and Painting) for which he provided the photographs.

The standard author abbreviation Hirmer is used to indicate this person as the author when citing a botanical name.

== Selected works ==
- Zur Lösung des Problems der Blattstellungen, 1922.
- Handbuch der Paläobotanik (in German), Oldenbourg, München, 1927
- With Eberhard Otto and Christiane Desroches-Noblecourt: Ägypten: Architektur, Plastik, Malerei in drei Jahrtausenden., 1955; vierte neu bearbeitete und sehr erweiterte Auflage, Hirmer, München 1967; republished as Ägyptische Kunst., Taschenbuch, München 1971, ISBN 3-423-04092-0 and ISBN 3-423-04093-9.
