= Harry E. Ahles =

American botanist

- Ahles in Kankakee, Illinois c. 1950
- Born: 1924
- Died: 1981 (aged 56–57); Amherst, Massachusetts
- Scientific career
- Fields: Botany
- Workplaces: University of Illinois; University of North Carolina at Chapel Hill; New York Botanical Garden

Harry E. Ahles (1924–1981) was an American botanist.

Although he had no formal education beyond high school, his profound botanical knowledge allowed him to enter the botanical profession as an herbarium curator at the University of Illinois.

He later followed Ritchie Bell to North Carolina to study the flora of that state, becoming the herbarium curator of the University of North Carolina, Chapel Hill in 1956. Albert E. Radford, Ahles, and Bell published the Manual of the Vascular Flora of the Carolinas in 1968 as a result of these researches. Ahles left Chapel Hill in 1966 due, in part, to his dislike of the installation of air conditioning in the herbarium. He took a position at the University of Massachusetts at Amherst.

Ahles collected over 200,000 specimens while at Chapel Hill, and was similarly active at Amherst, where he built a log cabin atop Horse Mountain for his residence. He died in 1981.
