= Van Hall Larenstein University of Applied Sciences =

University in The Netherlands

- Hogeschool Van Hall Larenstein
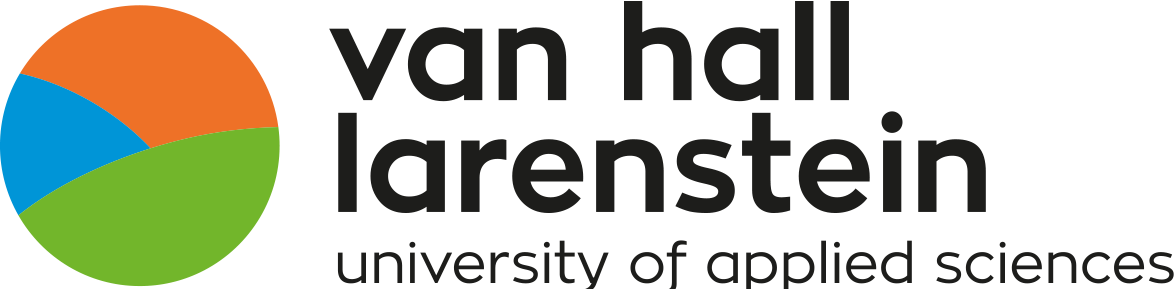
- Type: Vocational University
- Established: 2003
- President: J. van Iersel
- Administrative staff: 394
- Students: 4,293 (2015)
- Location: Leeuwarden and Velp, Netherlands
- Campus: Urban
- Colors: Green; Orange; Blue
- Website: www.hvhl.nl

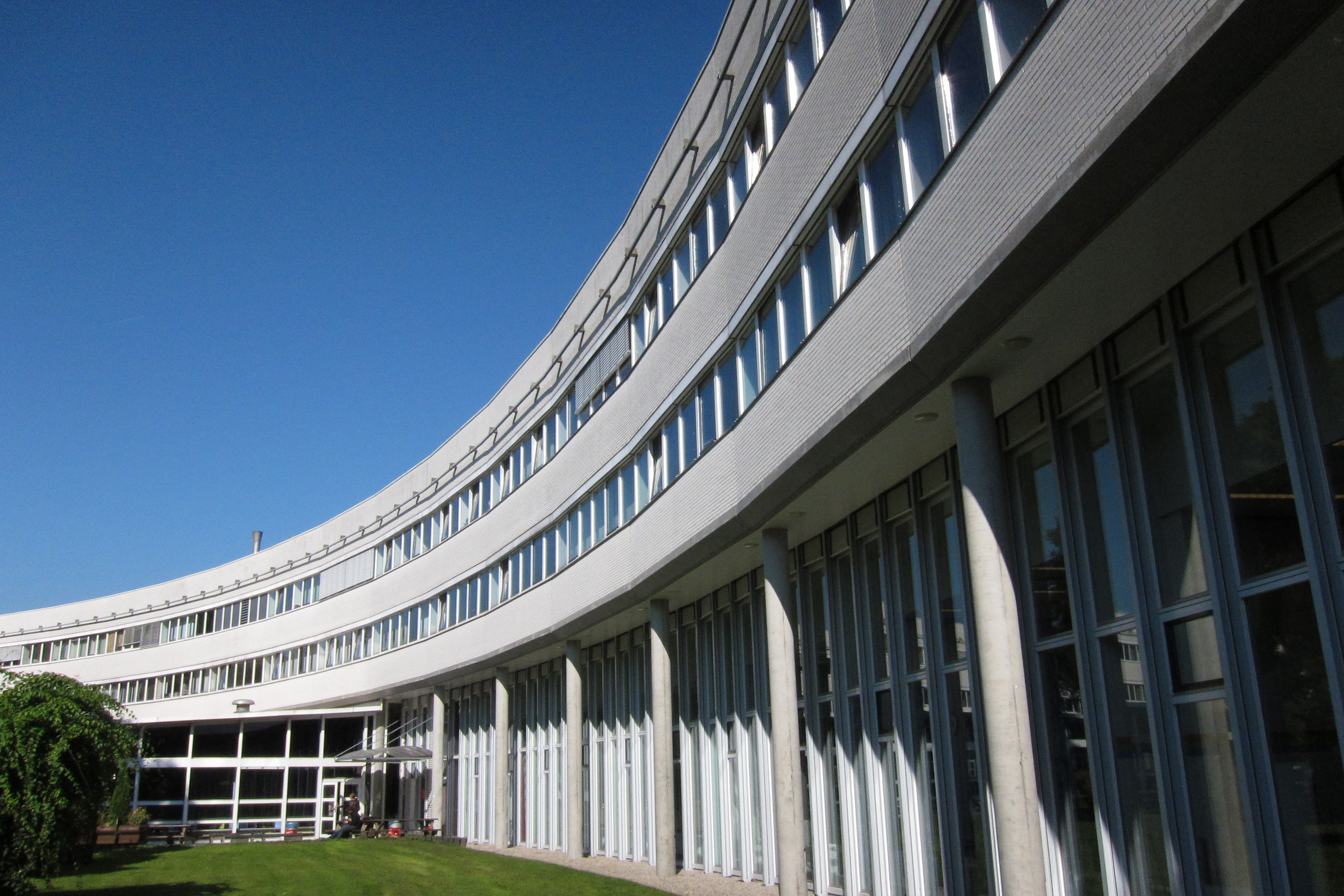

Van Hall Larenstein University of Applied Sciences (abbreviated as: VHL; Dutch: Hogeschool Van Hall Larenstein) is a vocational university in the Netherlands. It has locations in Leeuwarden and Velp (near Arnhem).

== History ==
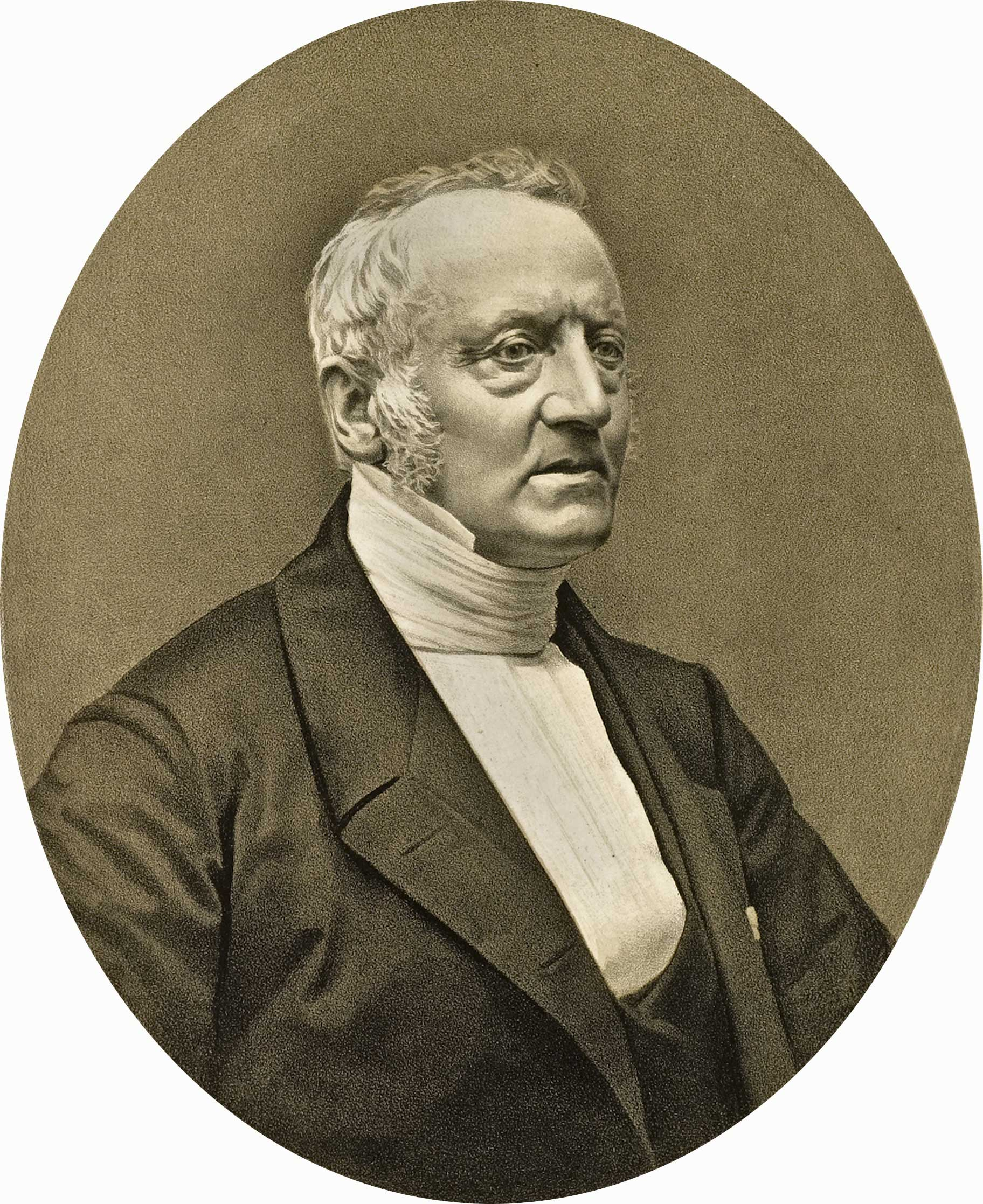
Portrait of Professor Van Hall

Since January 2003, there was an administrative merger between the Van Hall Institute (Leeuwarden) and IAH Larenstein (Velp/Deventer). The merger of the educational institutions was completed in October 2005, and got the name Van Hall Larenstein. In September 2006, the Deventer location moved to Wageningen, as Van Hall Larenstein became part of Wageningen University & Research. Since 2012, Van Hall Larenstein has been independent again. The location in Wageningen moved to Velp in 2015. Van Hall Larenstein now has locations in Leeuwarden and Velp.

== Study programs ==
Van Hall Larenstein provides the following bachelor's programs and master's programs. In addition, Van Hall Larenstein offers various associate degree programs and courses.

=== Bachelor's programs ===
Bachelor's program	Location	Form of study	Main language
Agribusiness and business administration	Leeuwarden	Full-time	Dutch
Animal management	Leeuwarden	Full-time	Dutch
Animal husbandry	Leeuwarden and Velp	Full-time	Dutch and English
Biology and medical laboratory research	Leeuwarden	Full-time	Dutch
Biotechnology	Leeuwarden	Full-time	Dutch
Chemical engineering	Leeuwarden	Full-time	Dutch
Chemistry	Leeuwarden	Full-time	Dutch
Coastal and marine management	Leeuwarden	Full-time	Dutch and English
Environmental sciences	Leeuwarden	Full-time and part-time	Dutch
Food technology	Leeuwarden and Velp	Full-time	Dutch and English
Forensic laboratory research	Leeuwarden	Full-time	Dutch
Forestry and nature management	Velp	Full-time and part-time	Dutch
Garden and landscape architecture	Velp	Full-time and part-time	Dutch
Horticulture and arable farming	Velp	Full-time	Dutch
International business	Leeuwarden	Full-time	English
International business in food and flowers	Velp	Full-time	English
International Development management	Velp	Full-time	English
Land and water management	Velp	Full-time and part-time	Dutch
Management of the living environment	Leeuwarden and Velp	Full-time	Dutch

=== Master's programs ===
Master's program	Location	Form of study	Main language
Agricultural production chain management	Velp	Full-time	English
Innovative dairy chain management	Velp and Leeuwarden	Full-time and part-time	English
Management of development	Velp	Full-time	English
River delta development	Velp	Full-time	English

== Photo gallery ==
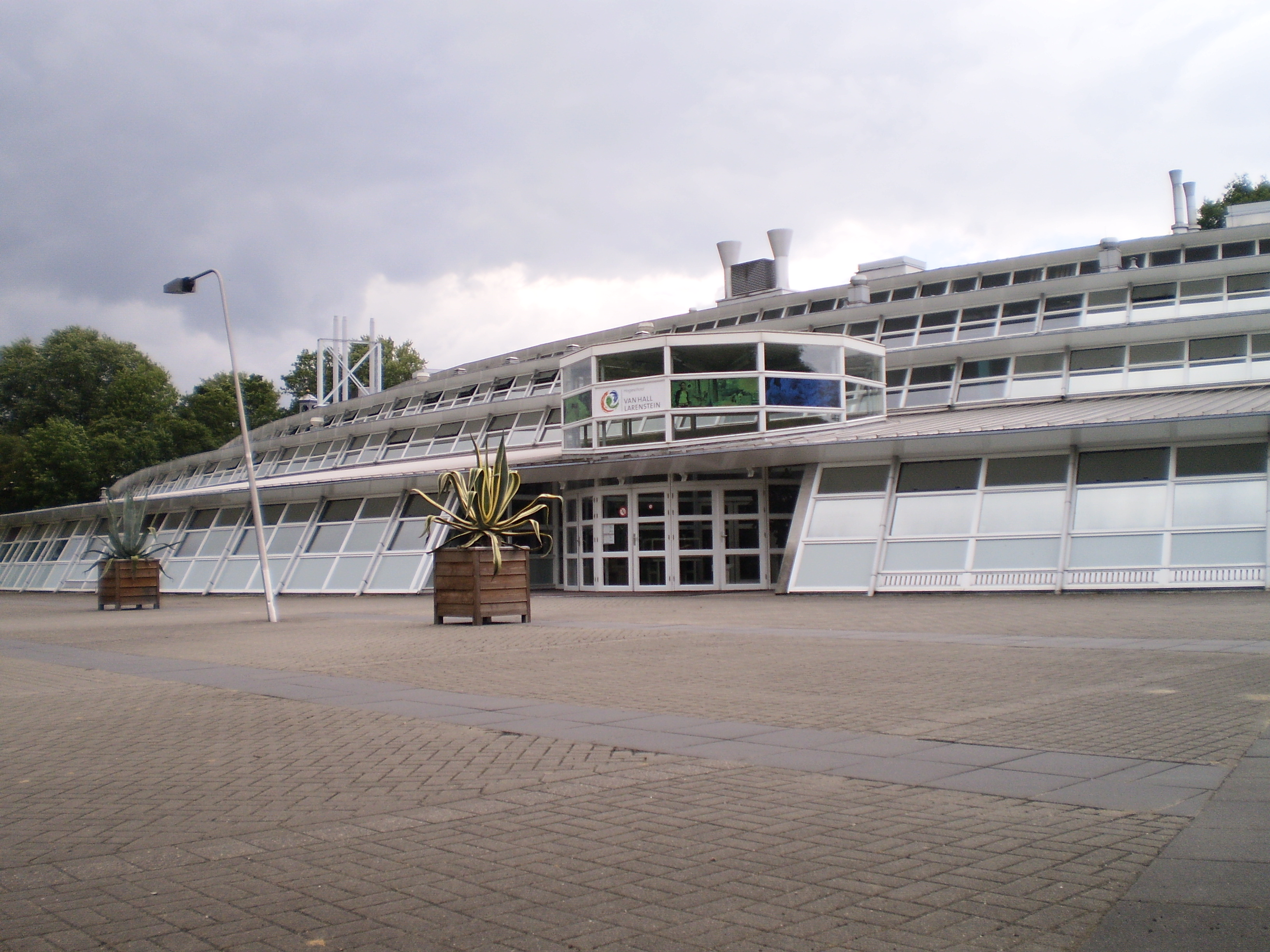
The main entrance of the campus location in Velp

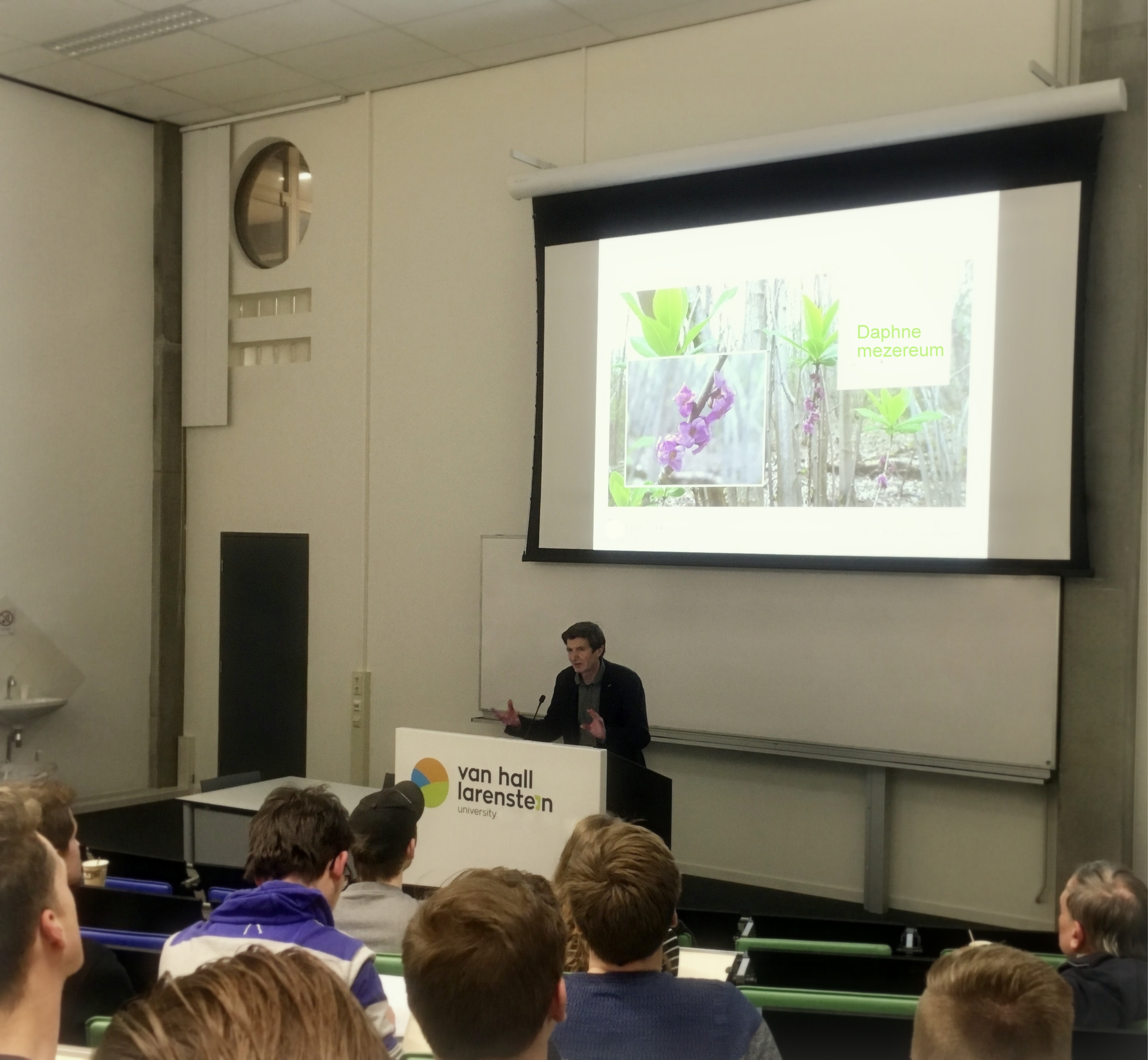
A lecture by botanist Prof. Joop Schaminée

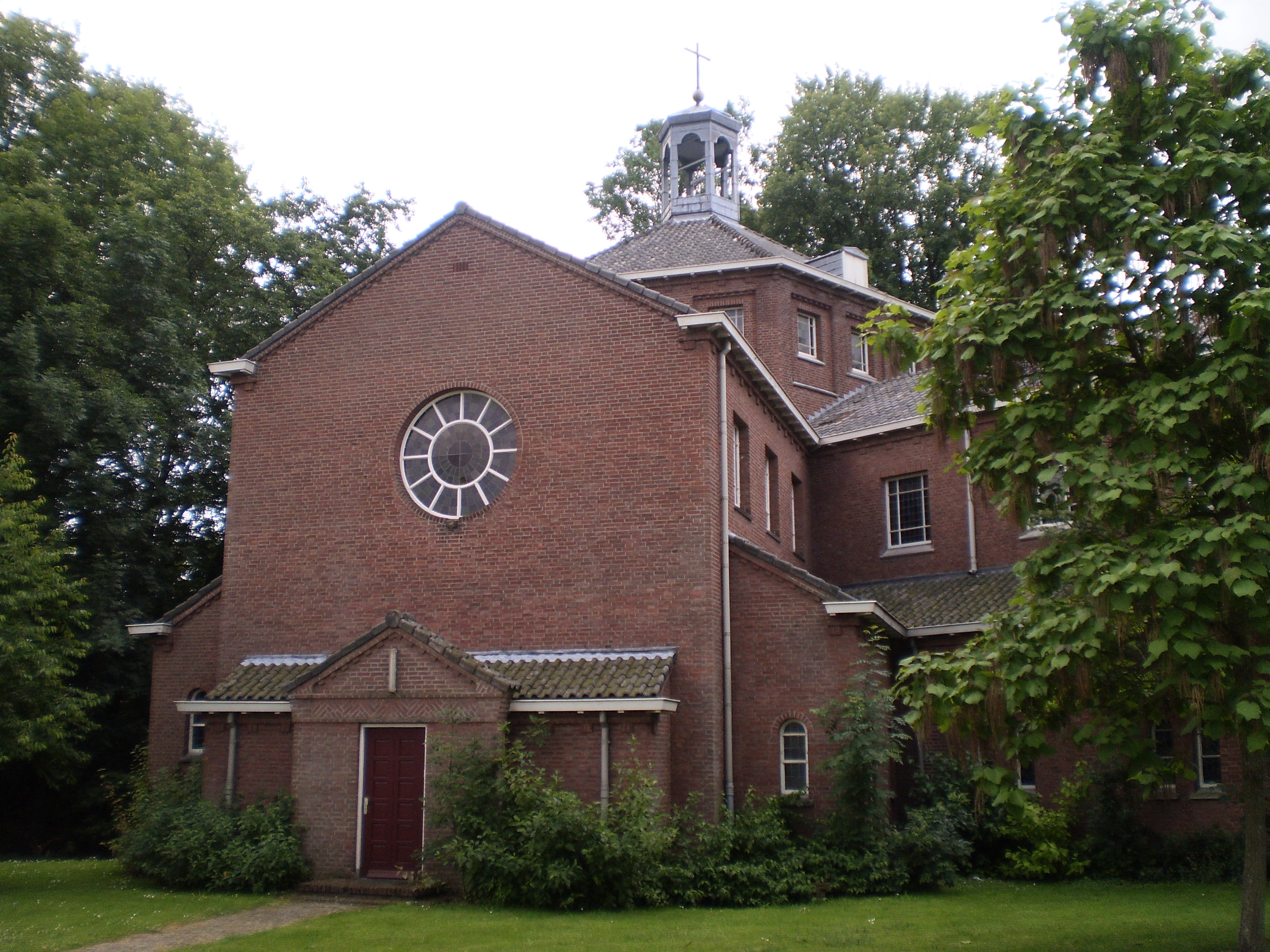
The Larenstein Chapel (lecture hall) in Velp

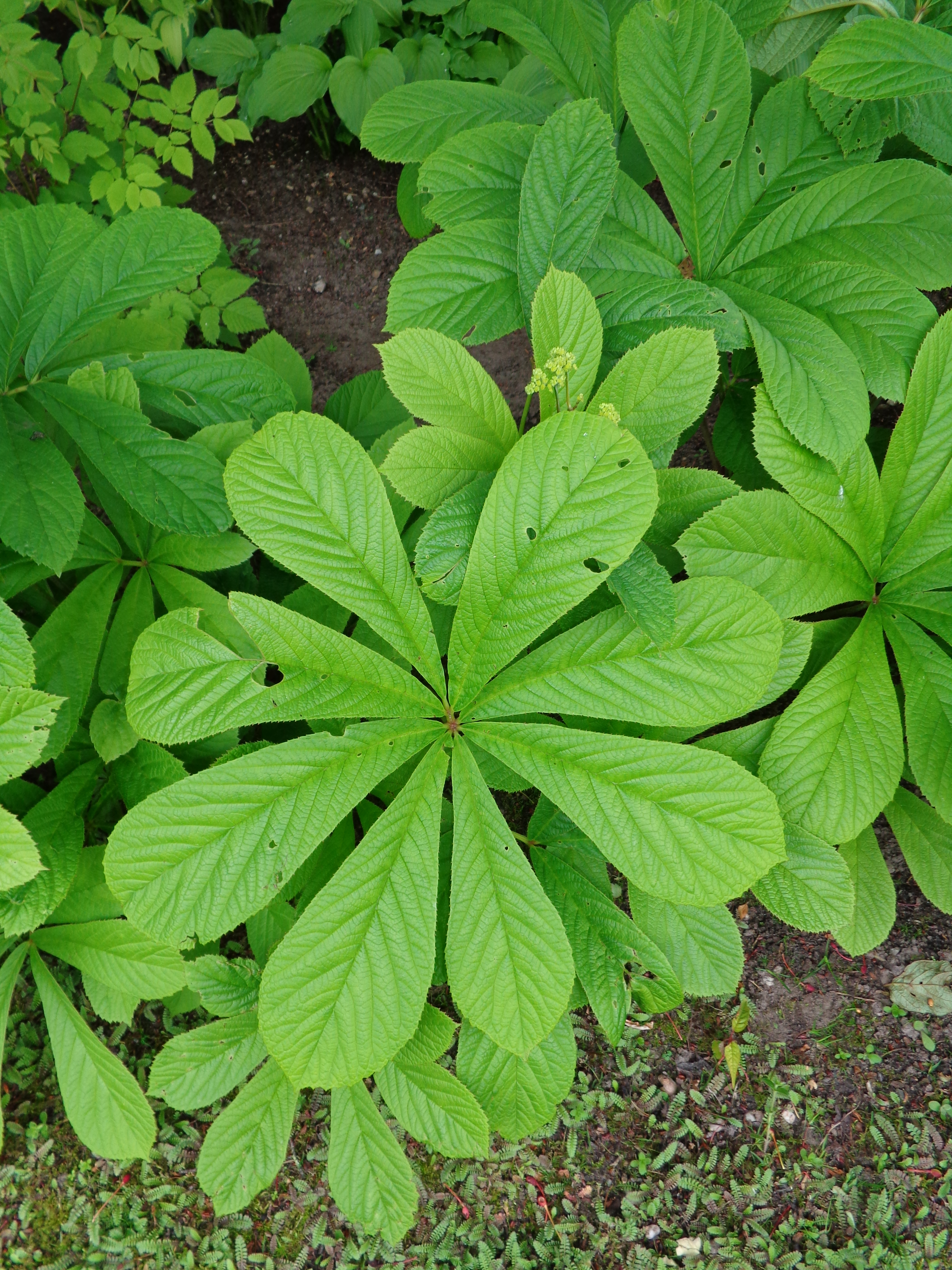
Rodgersia aesculifolia in the botanical gardens of the location in Velp

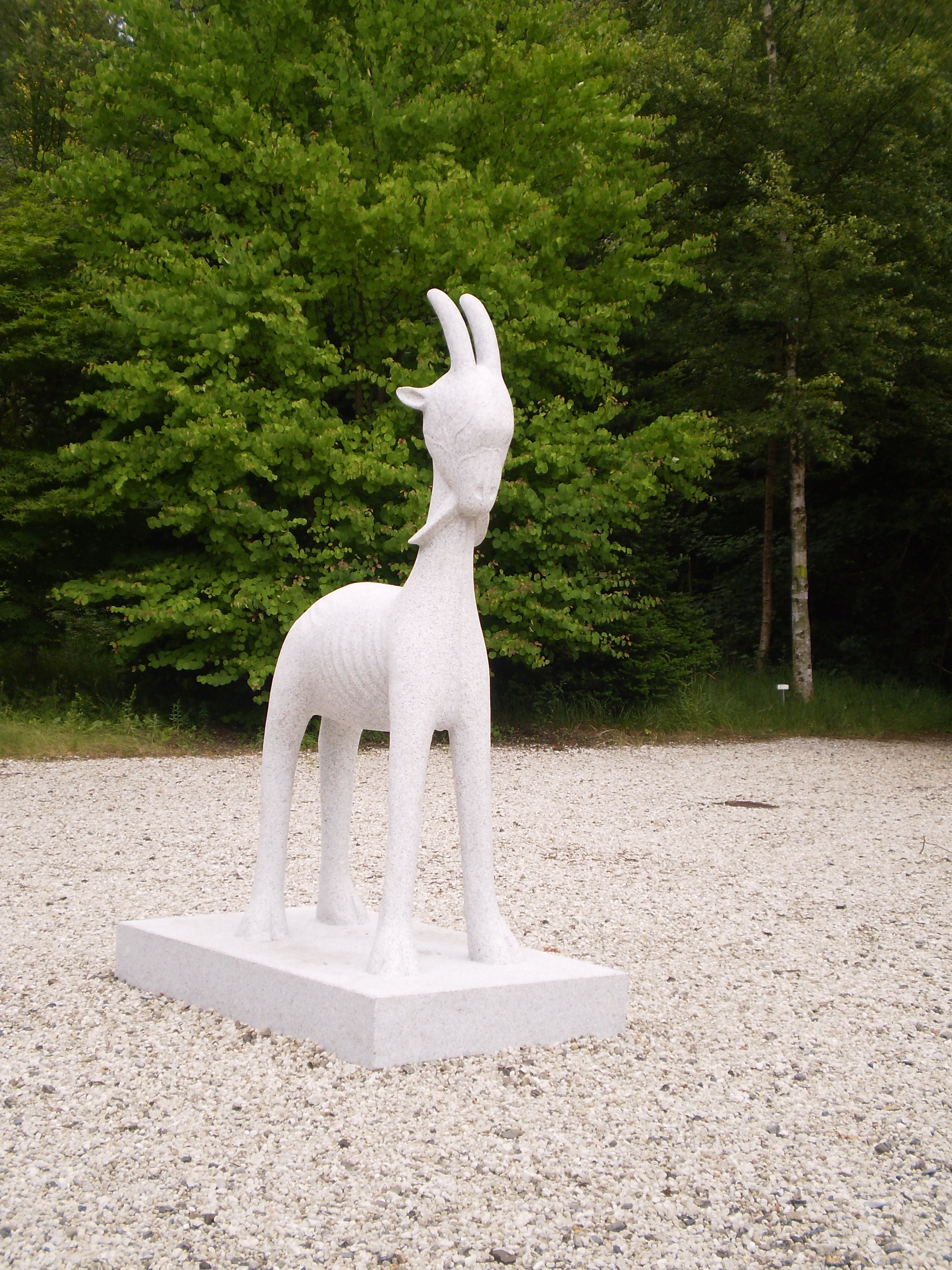
The Goat (statue); the symbol of Arboricultura (student society)

== See also ==
- Wageningen University and Research
- Stoas University of Applied Sciences
- HAS University of Applied Sciences
- Van Hall Institute
