= Ladislav Hagara =

Slovak mycologist and writer

- Born: 15 January 1944 (age 82); Nováky, Slovakia
- Occupations: Mycologist, writer
- Writing career
- Language: Slovak
- Genres: Field guides; novels; short stories
- Subjects: Mushrooms of Slovakia; occupational drama; social conditions
- Notable work: Otto's Encyclopedia of Mushrooms

Ladislav Hagara (born January 15, 1944) is a Slovak mycologist, writer and author of mycological publications. He held the position of the Chairman of the Slovak Mycological Society of the Slovak Academy of Sciences, and described a new fungal species variety.

== Biography ==
Hagara graduated in journalism at the Faculty of Arts of the Comenius University in Bratislava, Slovakia in 1968. However he was banned from pursuing his profession as a journalist on ideological grounds—based on articles he wrote protesting the 1968 Warsaw Pact invasion of Czechoslovakia, he was registered as a "hostile person" by the ŠtB secret police. Instead he worked as an editor and a director of a publishing house.

In 2003, he successfully defended his dissertation on the topic of The Hyphodontia Genus in Slovakia (Basidiomycota, Corticiaceae).

His mushroom field guides have sold over half a million copies across more than 35 editions (in addition to Slovak also in Czech, French, German, Dutch and Hungarian), and include Otto's Encyclopedia of Mushrooms, a field guide to mushrooms growing in the territory of Slovakia and Czechia, containing 4,200 photographs and descriptions of 3,230 species. The Slovak names of more than 1000 of these species were created by Hagara. As a part of his mycological scientific research, he has collected and processed more than 15,000 herbarium specimen of mushrooms. In 1990 he described and published a new variety of Infundibulicybe gibba var. adstringens. The standard author abbreviation Hagara is used to indicate this person as the author when citing a botanical name. He has also published several photo books about mushrooms.

He is a member of the Slovak Writers' Society. In 1998 he became the chairman of the Mushroom Research Society, he is a member (and between 2015 and 2018 the chairman) of the Slovak Mycological Society of the Slovak Academy of Sciences, as well as a member of mycological societies in Czechia, Austria and Germany.

Hagara has also written several social-justice-themed short stories, and novels set in Slovak research institutions.

== Publications ==
=== Fiction ===
- Matej Hrebenda: Vlastný životopis = Matej Hrebenda: Biography (1976)
- Kroky času = The Steps of Time (1979)
- Arzén = Arsenic (1984)
- Slnovrat = Solstice (1987)
- Blíženci = Gemini (1990)
- Uzly = Knots (1990)

=== Mycological works ===
- Atlas húb = Field Guide of Mushrooms (1987)
- Huby dvojníky = Mushroom Doubles (1992)
- Veľký atlas húb = The Great Field Guide of Mushrooms (2005) by Hagara, Jiří Bajer, and Vladimír Antonín
- Huby – Atlas = Mushrooms – A Field Guide (2006)
- Ottova encyklopédia húb = Otto's Encyclopedia of Mushrooms (2014)
- Huby – Atlas jedlých húb s osvedčenými receptami = Mushrooms – A Field Guide of Edible Mushrooms with Proven Recipes (2018) by Hagara, Oldřich Jindřich, and Aleš Vít

== Awards ==
- 1984: Slovak Literary Fund Award for the novel Arzén = Arsenic
- 1985: Golden Medal of the Slovak Women's Federation for the novel Arzén = Arsenic
