= Van Hall Instituut =

Agricultural university in the Netherlands

The Van Hall Instituut is part of Van Hall Larenstein University of Applied Sciences, and is specialised in agriculture, food technology, and environmental and animal sciences. It is a teaching, training, and research centre in the north of the Netherlands offering students Bachelor and Specialist degree programmes, which focus on such themes as nature, the environment, animal care, rural resources, sustainability, and nutrition.

The Van Hall Instituut is named after Herman van Hall (1801–74), a professor from the University of Groningen.

Also the Van Hall Instituut has got a sorority named S.V. Osiris, that is founded on the first of Januari, 1996. All students of all the different majors or bachelors can become a member of this sorority.

== Locations ==
The Van Hall Instituut has two locations.

- Leeuwarden
- Groningen

== Departments ==
- Environmental Science
- Food and Business
- Life Sciences
- Animal Management
- Agricultural Sciences
- Expertise Centre Geo-Information Studies and Soil Management

== Collaborations ==
- Noordelijke Hogeschool Leeuwarden
- Stenden (formerly Christelijke Hogeschool Nederland)
