= Harriet George Barclay =

Botanist (1901–1990)

Harriet George Barclay (31 August 1901 - 25 May 1990) was an American botanist, plant ecologist, nature conservationist, and artist. The standard author abbreviation H.G.Barclay is used to indicate this person as the author when citing a botanical name.

== Biography ==
Barclay was a professor at the University of Tulsa. She later became Chair of the Botany Department in 1953.

She also taught at universities across America: Colorado, Arkansas, Illinois, and North Carolina.

Harriet George Barclay collected over 35,000 plants from 6 different continents, including 15,000 different specimens from South America while conducting research there.

She has over 2,000 specimens on record as identified or collected.

== Degrees ==
- B.A., Botany, University of Minnesota, 1923
- M.A., Botany, University of Minnesota, 1924
- Ph.D. Plant Ecology, University of Chicago, 1928
- B.A. Art, University of Tulsa, 1945

== Positions ==
- Chair of the Botany Department, Tulsa University, OK
- Trustee, Philbrook Museum of Art, OK
- President, Tulsa Garden Club, OK
- Member, Tulsa Artists Guild, OK

== Accomplishments ==
Barclay was instrumental in getting the Nature Conservancy in Washington, D.C. to lease land to the University of Tulsa for Redbud Valley Nature Preserve - the first project of its kind in Oklahoma.

== Awards and honors ==
- "Woman of the Year," American Women in Radio and Television, 1959
- "Conservationist of the Year," Oklahoma Wildlife Federation, 1971
- "Distinguished Service Award," Henry Kendall College of Arts and Sciences, Tulsa University, 1975
- "Oklahoma Hall of Fame," 1976

== Interesting facts ==
- 10 plants are named after Barclay.

== Quotes ==
"A trip has no value if you come home and forget it" - Harriet George Barclay.

== See also ==
- University of Minnesota
- University of Chicago
- University of Tulsa
- Philbrook Museum of Art
