= Willie Commelin Scholten Phytopathology Laboratory =

Dutch research institute

The Willie Commelin Scholten Phytopathological Laboratory now known as the WCS-Foundation (In Dutch: Stichting Willie Commelin Scholten voor de Fytopathologie) was a plant pathology research institute in the Netherlands. It was established in Amsterdam on 18 December 1894 but moved to Baarn in 1920. It was merged into the university system in 1992.

The institute was begun in 1894 with funding from Mr C.W.R. Scholten and Mrs H.H. Scholten née Commelin and named after their deceased son Willie who had been interested in plant pathology after training under Hugo de Vries. It was originally created to support the flower bulb trade and later began to support tobacco and sugarcane plantations in the Dutch East Indies. The first director was Professor J. Ritzema Bos. Another institute of phytopathology was created at Wageningen and was directed by Ritzema Bos from 1905. Following his departure, the laboratory was headed by Johanna Westerdijk, the first woman professor in the Netherlands. She served as a director from 1906 to 1952. After her retirement, Louise Kerling became director of the institute.

In 1920, laboratory was moved to Baarn and placed under the University of Utrecht. In 1991 the laboratory in Baarn was closed but the WCS-Foundation continued to exist. and the WCS-Laboratory was placed under it. The institute at Baarn was converted in 1964 into a repository for fungal cultures - ‘Centraalbureau voor Schimmelcultures’ (CBS).
