= Henrik Viktor Rosendahl =

Swedish botanist and pharmacologist (1855–1918)

Henrik Viktor Rosendahl (12 December 1855, Filipstad – 11 August 1918, Stockholm, was a Swedish physician, pharmacologist and botanist.

He began his studies as a pharmacist (degree 1879), and continued to study medicine in Lund (med. kand. 1883 at the Karolinska Institute, and rned. lic. 1886 also at KI). Among other things, it can be mentioned that Rosendahl was the district doctor of Gallivare from 1888-1892.

After Rosendahl qualified to practice medicine in 1886, he became a doctor of medicine (graduate with a research doctorate) and docent at the Karolinska Institute in 1894. He was a professor extraordinarius in pharmacology and pharmacognosy at Uppsala University from 1895 to 1896. At the Pharmaceutical Institute in Stockholm, he was a lecturer from 1895 to 1901, a professor extraordinarius from 1901 to 1911, and a professor ordinarius and director of the Pharmaceutical Institute from 1911 until his death in 1918. (The Pharmaceutical Institute was started in 1837 and was merged into Uppsala University in 1968.)

After 1895, he not only continued as a lecturer, but also maintained a private clinic in Stockholm which specialized in sexually transmitted diseases. As an author, Rosendahl’s works were comprised mostly of textbooks, and botanical essays.

Rosendahl's writings deal with pharmacology, pharmacognosy, and related areas of research, such as Farmakologiska undersökningar rörande Aconitum septentrionale (Pharmacological studies concerning Aconitum septentrionale; 1893, later translated into German), Järnets verkningssätt inom organismen (The mode of action of iron in the organism, 1894), Kopparns fysiologiska betydelse för växt- och djurriket, dess giftverkan och terapeutiska användning (The physiological significance of copper for the plant and animal kingdom, its toxicity and therapeutic use, 1895), Analys af bröd från vikingatiden (Analysis of bread from the Viking Age, 1911), etc.

As a botanist, he focused on cultivation and study of the ferns and wrote about native Swedish species in Bidrag till Sveriges ormbunksflora (Contributions to the Swedish flora, part 1, 1909; part 2, 1913). He was also the author of two textbooks for higher education, Lärobok i farmakognosi (Textbook of pharmacognosy, 1897) and Lärobok i botanik (Textbook of botany, 1903). From 1914 he was a member of the permanent pharmacopoeia committee of the Pharmaceutical Institute.

His grave is in Norra begravningsplatsen.

== Selected publications ==
- Rosendahl, H.V. (1895). "On Septentrionalin As An Anæsthetic And Substitute For Curare In The Performance Of Vivisection". The British Medical Journal: 657–658.
- Rosendahl, H. V. (1897). Lärobok i farmakognosi. Schultz.
