= Huron Herbert Smith =

Botanist (1883–1933)

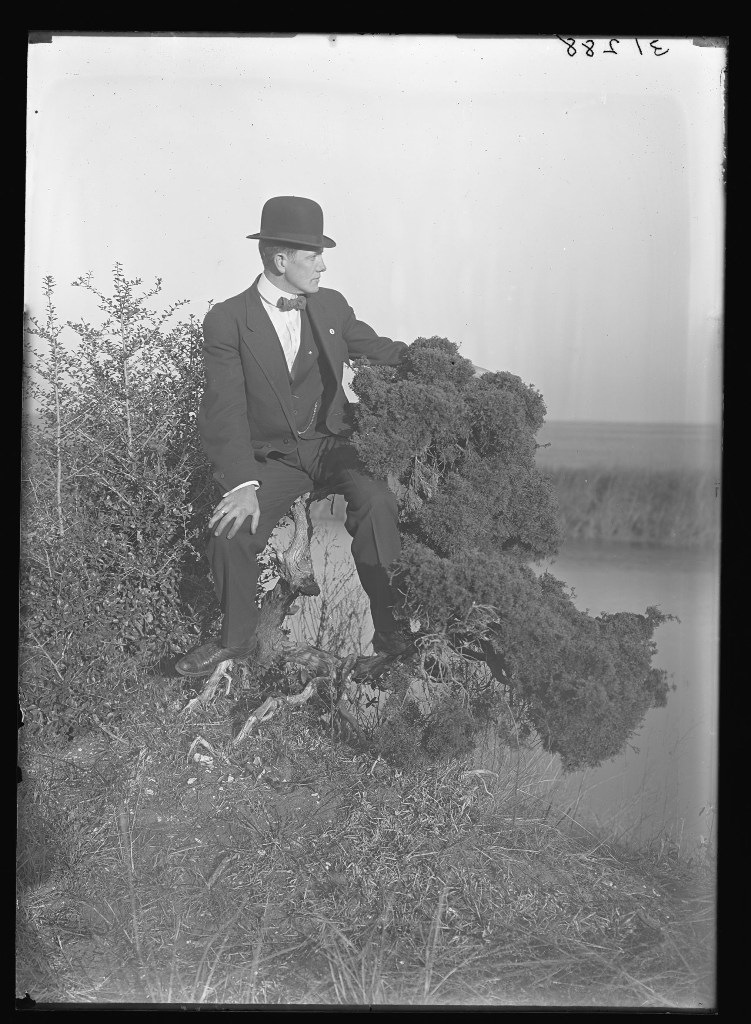
- Huron H. Smith in suit, with bow tie and bowler hat.
- Born: July 26th, 1883; Danville, Indiana, US
- Died: February 25th, 1933 (age 49); Glenview, Illinois, US
- Education: DePauw University and Cornell University
- Known for: Ethnobotany and photography
- Scientific career
- Fields: Botany and ethnobotany
- Workplaces: Field Museum of Natural History and Milwaukee Public Museum
- Author abbrev. (botany): Hur.H.Sm.

Huron Herbert Smith (July 26th, 1883 – February 25th, 1933) was an American botanist and ethnobotanist. Born in Danville, Indiana, he studied and wrote about the use of plants by several tribes of Native Americans. He was an alumnus of Depauw University and Cornell University, and after receiving his degrees, became the assistant curator of botany at the Field Museum of Natural History followed then by becoming the head of the botany department at the Milwaukee Public Museum. Smith's botanical specimen collection is stored at the Milwaukee Public Museum, digitized and available for viewing online. Smith died in 1933 as the result of an automobile accident.
