= George H. Hepting =

American forest scientist and plant pathologist (1907–1988)

- Born: September 1, 1907; Brooklyn
- Died: April 29, 1988 (aged 80)
- Education: Cornell University
- Occupation: Forestry scientist
- Employer: United States Department of Agriculture

George Henry Hepting (September 1, 1907 – April 29, 1988) was an American forest scientist and plant pathologist. Hepting was Chief Plant Pathologist at Southeastern Forest Experiment Station of US Forest Service and a member of the National Academy of Sciences. He has been called a "pioneer leader in forest pathology".

Hepting was educated at Cornell University with an undergraduate degree in 1929 and a Ph.D. in 1933. He spent much of his career at the Southeastern Forest Experiment Station of the US Forest Service, which he joined in 1931 as a Field Assistant. He served as Chief of the Division of Forest Disease Research at the Southeastern Forest Experiment Station in Asheville, North Carolina (1953-1961) and as Principal Research Scientist for the Washington office of the Forest Service (1962-1971). Hepting was also a visiting professor at North Carolina State University (1967-1984), on plant pathology and forest resources.

Hepting directed generative research on diseases of forests such as annosum root rot, the use of soil fumigation in nurseries, and the role of ozone and other oxidants as causes of diseases in forests. He was also noted for creation of the first computerized system for information retrieval in forestry.

His books included the comprehensive encyclopedia Diseases of Forest and Shade Trees in the United States (1971). His research papers included the cross-disciplinary "Climate and Forest Diseases" (1963); "Death of the American chestnut" (1974), a history of the failure to control chestnut blight; "The threatoned elms" (1977) on Dutch elm disease and elm phloem necrosis; and many others. Hepting's papers are part of the Archival Collections at NC State University Libraries.

== Awards and distinctions ==
- 1969 - the first forester elected to the National Academy of Sciences
- 1954 - the Superior Service Award of the U.S. Department of Agriculture
- 1963 - the Barrington Moore Award for outstanding achievements in forestry research
- 1965 - Fellow of the Society of American Foresters
- 1966 - Fellow of the American Phytopathological Society
- 1974 - the Weyerhaeuser Award for Outstanding Historical Writing from the Forest History Society
