= Nellie Violet Haynie =

Nellie Violet Haynie (22 October 1886 – February 1980), also N.V. Haynie, was a plant collector in the Chicago region, mostly during the 1920s and 1930s.

== Life and work ==
The records of the Field Museum for 1928 state that Haynie "contributed material of several unusual plants of the Chicago region, among them albino-fruited forms of the black raspberry and choke-cherry, unknown heretofore from this flora."

There are two mentions of her in a 1929 volume of Rhodora for notable species she had collected. She worked full time as a bookkeeper and notary public and botanized extensively on the weekends. In 1932 she documented the arrival of puncture vine in Clark, Indiana and submitted specimens to the Field Museum. In 1933 she was the first to document that non-native common periwinkle had naturalized in North Carolina.

There are two vouchers from Denali National Park in Alaska that were collected by her sister Rachel Winona Haynie, so it is quite possible they botanized together. Rachel was also a bookkeeper. In 1932 they donated their collection of over 400 specimens of insects to the Field Museum. In 1959, the same year that Rachel passed, Nellie and her brother Robert donated her collection of 3980 plant specimens to the Field Museum.

A resident of Downers Grove, Illinois, she was one of six siblings. She was buried at Montrose Cemetery.
