= Jacob Jeswiet =

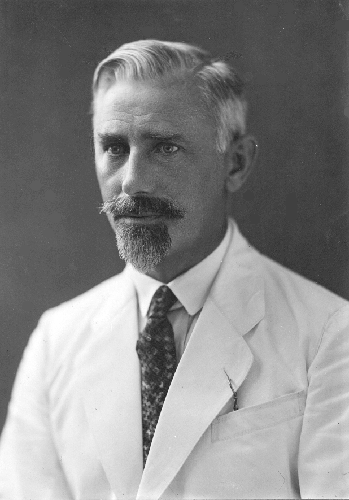

Jacob Jeswiet (December 28, 1879 – July 23, 1960) was a Dutch botanist who worked in the sugar experimental station in Pasoeroean in Java, and then returned to the Netherlands in 1925 to become a professor at the Wageningen Agricultural College. While in Java he was involved in breeding the variety POJ 2878, which was called the Javan wondercane.

Jeswiet was born in Amsterdam, where he studied botany, after which he went to Berlin and Zurich, receiving a doctorate in 1913 from Zurich. He studied the ecology of plants in dunes, and his dissertation was titled Die Entwickelungsgeschichte der Flora der holländischen Dünen. He worked from 1912 to 1923 at the Pasoeroean experimental station in Java, where he was involved in producing sugarcane hybrids for resistance to diseases. He was involved in the production of POJ 2878, which was disease-resistant and high-yielding which came to be known as the Javan wondercane. He also collected botanical specimens including, wild sugarcane relatives, from the Papua New Guinea region in 1928. He became a professor at Wageningen in1925 and worked until the end of World War II. He was dishonorably dismissed in 1946 for his collaboration with the Germans and for being a member of the National Socialist Movement (NSB).
