= Helen Jean Brown =

American botanist (1903–1982)

Helen Jean (Brown) Bromley (9 August 1903, in Beaumont – 16 June 1982, in Stamford) was an American botanist and phycologist noted for her study of the algal family Vaucheriaceae. She earned her PhD from Ohio State University, in 1929. She published using her maiden name, and served as both an instructor of botany and registrar at the University of Connecticut. She was married to entomologist Stanley Willard Bromley.

The standard author abbreviation H.J.Br. is used to indicate this person as the author when citing a botanical name.

== Works ==
- Brown, Helen Jean (1929). "The Algal Family Vaucheriaceae". Transactions of the American Microscopical Society. 48 (1): 86–117. doi:10.2307/3222465. ISSN 0003-0023. JSTOR 3222465.
- Brown, Helen Jean (1930). "The Desmids of the Southeastern Coastal Plain Region of United States". Transactions of the American Microscopical Society. 49 (2): 97–139. doi:10.2307/3222306. ISSN 0003-0023. JSTOR 3222306.
