= R K Hegde =

Indian academic

Dr Ramachandra Kuppayya Hegde (9 July 1931 in Uttara Kannada – 20 July 1991) was an Indian academic and the second Vice Chancellor of University of Agricultural Sciences, Dharwad.

== Education ==
Hegde completed his early education in Kekkar school, where he topped the Bombay state matriculation exam. In college he completed his B.Sc. degree in agriculture and M.Sc. in plant pathology. He went in 1961 to Ohio State University for an M.S. in plant pathology. He joined the Indian Agricultural Research Institute in New Delhi and obtained a Ph.D. with a gold medal under the able guidance of R. L. Munjal. He conclusively proved the serodiagonistic test which could be used in identification of physiologic races of Colletotrichum lindemuthainum.

== Career ==
Hegde worked as an agricultural demonstrator and lecturer from 1956 to 1960. He served as assistant mycologist at the Department of Horticulture at Research Station Chettalli from 1962 to 1967. After that he joined the University of Agricultural sciences as assistant professor of plant pathology at the College of Agriculture Dharwad, where he was later promoted to associate professor of plant pathology. In 1969 he became a professor of plant pathology.

He served in various committees. Member of ICAR Committee constituted to survey the beetle vine diseases. He served as member of selection and screening committees of Agricultural Scientists recruitment board. Hegde represented India in international symposia and visited the United States, New Zealand and Australia as a visiting professor. He guided 10 PhD students and over 30 M.Sc. students in plant pathology.

Hegde served as head of the Department of Plant Pathology of University of Agricultural sciences from 1978 onwards and as head, Division of Plan and Soils of UAS Bangalore. He was promoted to director of instruction at the College of Agriculture Dharwad from 1982 to 1987 and director of postgraduate studies in 1987. He them became the vice chancellor of University of Agricultural Sciences from November 1989 till his death on 20 July 1991.

== Legacy ==
Hegde worked in diverse fields of Plant Pathology. He published over 200 scientific papers on physiology, epidemiology and integral management of fungal eases of plants which were published in Indian and international journals of repute.

An annual RK Hegde memorial lecture is organised at the college.
