= Gijsbertus Houtzagers =

Dutch botanist

Gijsbertus Houtzagers (30 September 1888, Barneveld - 11 May 1957, Arnhem) was a Dutch botanist employed as Professor of Sylviculture (Temperate Zone) for the Netherlands Organisation for Applied Scientific Research at the De Dorschkamp Research Institute and best known for his work on the taxonomy of poplar, the subject of his PhD.

== Works ==
- Houtzagers, G. (1939?). Nomina ambigua proposals about the botanical names of some Poplars. 10pp. Lanjouw, J. Ed. Proposals of Dutch Botanists. 1950 -26. Arnhem.
