= Herman Christiaan van Hall =

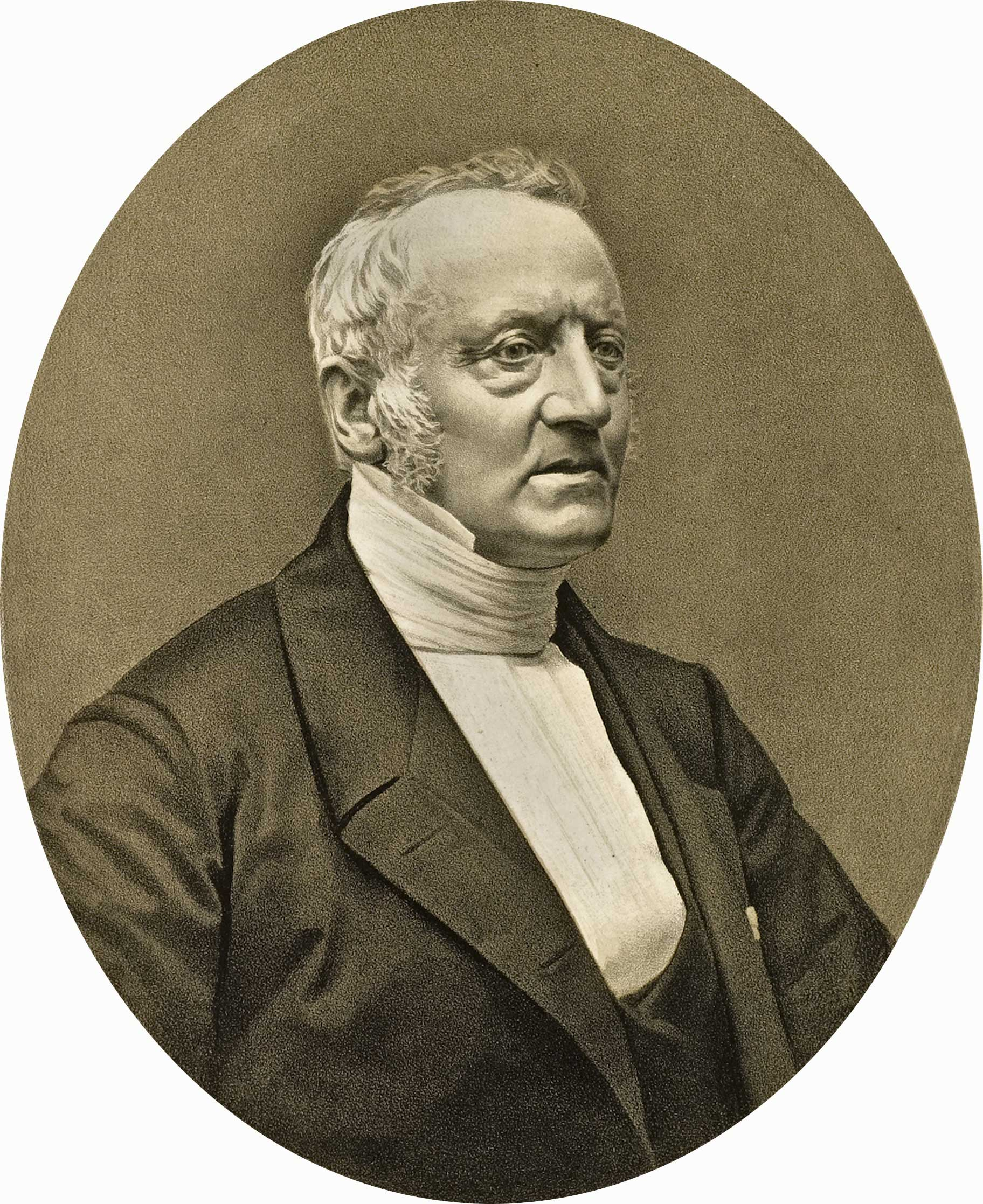
- Born: 18 August 1801
- Died: 12 January 1874 (aged 72); Beek, the Netherlands
- Citizenship: The Netherlands
- Education: Utrecht University
- Spouse: Maria Anna van Schermbeek (m. 1825)
- Father: Maurits Cornelis van Hall
- Relatives: Floris Adriaan van Hall (brother)
- Scientific career
- Fields: Botany
- Workplaces: University of Groningen
- Thesis: (1823)
- Author abbrev. (botany): H.C.Hall

Herman Christiaan van Hall latinized as Hermannus Christiaan van Hall(18 August 1801 – 12 January 1874) was a Dutch medical doctor, botanist and professor of botany at the University of Groningen who helped establish higher education in agriculture in the Netherlands.

== Life and work ==
Van Hall came from a patrician Amsterdam family, son of lawyer Maurits Cornelis van Hall and Elisabeth Christina Klinkhamer. He was the brother of Floris Adriaan van Hall. He went to Latin school and the Athenaeum in Amsterdam before going to study medicine at the University of Utrecht. Apart from medical studies he liked courses in botany and land management and his doctoral thesis in 1823 was on diseases of the chest. He then went on a grand tour through Germany and France before settling in Amsterdam as a doctor. He succeeded Jacobus Albertus Uilkens in 1825 at Groningen and the next year he was made professor of botany. In 1842 he established a Landarmskundige School (land survey school) in the city of Groningen where land management was taught until 1871. In 1871 he was granted a pension by royal decree and a Van Hall Institute was named after him where agricultural instruction was given.

Van Hall married Maria Anna van Schermbeek in 1825 in Utrecht, One of their sons, Herman van Hall (1830–1890) became a botanist at the Rijksherbarium. Van Hall died at Beek near Nijmegen.
