= Friedrich Adolph Haage =

German botanist and gardener (1796–1866)

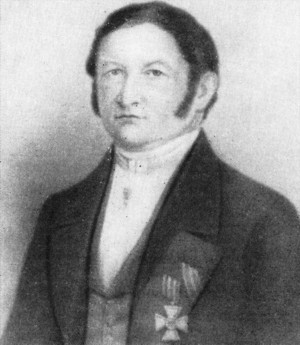
- Occupations: gardener; botanist

Friedrich Adolph Haage (24 March 1796 in Erfurt – 20 September 1866 in Erfurt) was a German gardener and botanist. The standard author abbreviation Haage is used to indicate this person as the author when citing a botanical name.

== Life and work ==
Haage was the son of Johann Nikolaus Haage and Catharina Barbara Nehrlich. He learned gardening from Johann Heinrich Seidel (1744–1815), the gardener of Frederick Augustus II of Saxony. After finishing his hiking years, he returned to Erfurt. Here he acquired a small plot of land and founded a nursery in 1822. The first seed catalog of his nursery was made in 1824. It is now lost.

Haage had one of the largest collections of cacti at his time.

He was co-founder of the Erfurter Gartenbauvereins (Erfurt Horticultural Association) and later became its director. Erfurt erected a monument of him.
