= List of botanists by author abbreviation (E–F) =

This is an incomplete list of botanists by their author abbreviation, which is designed for citation with the botanical names or works that they have published. This list follows that established by Brummitt & Powell (1992). Use of that list is recommended by Rec. 46A Note 1 of the International Code of Nomenclature for algae, fungi, and plants. The list is kept up to date online at The International Plant Names Index and Index Fungorum.

In some cases an "author abbreviation" consists of a full surname, while in other cases the surname is abbreviated and/or accompanied by one or more initials. There is no space between the initials and the surname (or its abbreviation).

==== Order of entries ====
The list here is maintained strictly in order of the alphabetic characters in the abbreviation; thus "A.B.Jacks." appears under "A" not "J", and is located as if the characters were "ABJACKS". Capitalization is ignored as are all non-alphabetic characters such as "." and space. Diacritical marks are also ignored, so that, e.g., "ü" is treated as if it were "u".

==== Navigation ====
Because of its length, the list is split across separate pages. All alphabetic sections can be accessed from the short table of contents; the vertical bars show the page divisions. Searching will only find an entry within a page.

== A–D ==
Contents:	A	B	C	D	E F	G	H	I J	K L	M	N O	P	Q R	S	T U V	W X Y Z

To find entries for A–D, use the table of contents above.

== E ==
Contents: Top	A	B	C	D	E F	G	H	I J	K L	M	N O	P	Q R	S	T U V	W X Y Z

- E.A.Barkley – Elizabeth Anne Barkley (1908–1994)
- E.A.Barthol. – Elizabeth Ann Bartholomew (1912–1985)
- E.A.Br. – Elizabeth Anne Brown (1956–2013)
- E.A.Bruce – Eileen Adelaide Bruce (1905–1955)
- E.A.Busch – Elizaveta Aleksandrovna Busch (1886–1960)
- E.A.Durand – Ernest Armand Durand (1872–1910)
- E.A.Flint – Elizabeth Alice Flint (1909–2011)
- E.A.Hodgs. – Eliza Amy Hodgson (1888–1983)
- E.A.Kellogg – Elizabeth Anne Kellogg (born 1951)
- Eakes – Michael James Eakes (fl. 1999)
- E.A.Mennega – Erik Albert Mennega (1923–1998)
- Eames – Edwin Hubert Eames (1865–1948)
- E.Arber – Edward Alexander Newell Arber (1870–1918)
- Eardley – Constance Margaret Eardley (1910–1978)
- Earle – Franklin Sumner Earle (1856–1929)
- E.Arm. – Eleanora Armitage (1865–1961)
- E.A.Rob. – Edward Armitage Robinson (1921–2013)
- E.A.Sánchez – Evangelina A. Sánchez (born 1934)
- E.A.Shaw – Elizabeth Anne Shaw (born 1938)
- Eastw. – Alice Eastwood (1859–1953)
- Eaton – Amos Eaton (1776–1842)
- E.A.White – Edward Albert White (1872–1943)
- E.B.Alexeev – Evgenii Borisovich Alexeev (1946–1976)
- E.B.Andrews – Ebenezer Baldwin Andrews (1821–1880)
- E.Barnes – Edward Barnes (1892–1941)
- E.B.Bartram – Edwin Bunting Bartram (1878–1964)
- E.B.Chamb. – Edward Blanchard Chamberlain (1878–1925)
- Eberm. – Johann Erdwin Christoph Ebermaier (1769–1825)
- Eb.Fisch. – Eberhard Fischer (born 1969)
- Ebinger – John Edwin Ebinger (born 1933)
- E.B.Knox – Eric B. Knox (fl. 1993)
- E.Britton – Elizabeth Gertrude Britton (née Knight) (1858–1934)
- E.C.Hall – Edwin Cuthbert Hall (1874–1953)
- E.C.Hansen – Emil Christian Hansen (1842–1909)
- Eckblad – Finn-Egil Eckblad (1923–2000)
- Eckenw. – James E. Eckenwalder (born 1949)
- Eckl. – Christian Friedrich Ecklon (1795–1868)
- E.C.Nelson – Ernest Charles Nelson (born 1951)
- E.Coleman – Edith Coleman (1874–1951)
- E.Cordus – Euricius Cordus (1486–1535)
- E.C.Wallace – Edward Charles Wallace (1909–1986)
- E.Danesch – Edeltraud Danesch (born 1922)
- E.D.Clarke – Edward Daniel Clarke (1769–1822)
- Eddy – Caspar Wistar Eddy (1790–1828)
- É.Desv. – Étienne-Émile Desvaux (1830–1854)
- Edgar – Elizabeth Edgar (1929–2019)
- Edgecombe – Walter Brian Edgecombe (born 1945)
- Edgew. – Michael Pakenham Edgeworth (1812–1881)
- Edginton – Mark Alexander Edginton (fl. 2015)
- Edlin – Herbert Leeson Edlin (1913–1977)
- E.D.Liu – En-De Liu (fl. 2004)
- Edmondston – Thomas Edmondston (1825–1846)
- Ed.Otto – Carlos Frederico Eduardo Otto (1812–1885)
- E.D.Rudolph – Emanuel David Rudolph (1927–1992)
- E.D.Schulz – Ellen Dorothy Schulz (1892–1970)
- Edwin – Gabriel Edwin (born 1926)
- Eeden – Frederik Willem van Eeden (1829–1901)
- É.E.Foëx – Étienne Edmond Foëx (1876–1944)
- E.E.Lamont – Eric E. Lamont (fl. 1990)
- E.E.Nelson – Elias Emanuel Nelson (1876–1949)
- E.E.Schill. – Edward E. Schilling (born 1953)
- E.E.Wilson – Edward Elmer Wilson (born 1900)
- E.F.Anderson – Edward Frederick Anderson (1932–2001)
- E.Fisch. – Eduard Fischer (1861–1939)
- E.Forbes – Edward Forbes (1815–1854)
- E.Forst. – Edward Forster (1765–1849)
- E.Fourn. – Eugène Pierre Nicolas Fournier (1834–1884)
- E.F.Warb. – Edmund Frederic Warburg (1908–1966)
- Egan – Robert Shaw Egan (born 1945)
- E.G.Andrews – Elisabeth G. Andrews, later Hooper (born 1960)
- E.G.Camus – Edmond Gustave Camus (1852–1915)
- E.G.Clem. – Edith Gertrude (Schwartz) Clements (1877–1971)
- Eggeling – William Julius Eggeling (1909–1994)
- Eggers – Henrik Franz Alexander von Eggers (1844–1903)
- Eggl. – Willard Webster Eggleston (1863–1935)
- Eggli – Urs Eggli (born 1959)
- E.G.H.Oliv. – Edward George Hudson Oliver (born 1938)
- Egler – Frank Edwin Egler (1911–1996)
- Egli – Bernhard Egli (fl. 1990)
- E.Goeze – Edmund Goeze (1838–1929)
- E.G.Voss – Edward Groesbeck Voss (1929–2012)
- E.Hitchc. – Edward Hitchcock (1793–1864)
- E.H.L.Krause – Ernst Hans Ludwig Krause (1859–1942)
- E.Hofm. – Elise Hofmann (1889–1955)
- Ehrenb. – Christian Gottfried Ehrenberg (1795–1876)
- Ehrend. – Friedrich Ehrendorfer (1927–2023)
- Ehret – Georg Dionysius Ehret (1708–1770)
- Ehrh. – Jakob Friedrich Ehrhart (1742–1795)
- E.H.Wilson – Ernest Henry Wilson (1876–1930)
- Eichler – August Wilhelm Eichler (1839–1887)
- Eichw. – Karl Eduard von Eichwald (1795–1876)
- Eig – Alexander Eig (1894–1938)
- E.Ives – Eli Ives (1779–1861)
- E.James – Edwin P. James (1797–1861)
- E.J.Butler – Edwin John Butler (1874–1943)
- E.J.Clement – E.J. Clement (fl. 2000)
- E.J.Dunn – Edward John Dunn (1844–1937)
- E.J.F.Campb. – Elaine Jean Foulds Campbell (born 1959)
- E.-J.Gilbert – Edouard-Jean Gilbert (1888–1954)
- E.J.Hill – Ellsworth Jerome Hill (1833–1917)
- E.J.Lowe – Edward Joseph Lowe (1825–1900)
- E.J.Palmer – Ernest Jesse Palmer (1875–1962)
- E.J.Quekett – Edwin John Quekett (1808–1847) (brother of John Thomas Quekett)
- E.J.Schmidt – Ernst Johannes Schmidt (1877–1933)
- E.K.Cameron – Ewen Kenneth Cameron (born 1949)
- Ekman – Erik Leonard Ekman (1883–1931)
- E.Lawton – Elva Lawton (1896–1993)
- E.L.Braun – Emma Lucy Braun (1889–1971)
- E.L.Cabral – Elsa Leonor Cabral (born 1951)
- É.Lemoine – Émile Lemoine (1862–1943)
- Elisens – Wayne J. Elisens (born 1948)
- Eliz.George – Elizabeth Anne George (1935–2012)
- Elliott – Stephen Elliott (1771–1830)
- Ellis – Job Bicknell Ellis (1829–1905)
- Ellw. – George Ellwanger (1816–1906)
- Elmer – Adolph Daniel Edward Elmer (1870–1942)
- E.L.Rand – Edward Lothrop Rand (1859–1924)
- E.L.Robertson – Enid Lucy Robertson (1925–2016)
- E.L.Schneid. – Edward L. Schneider (born 1947)
- E.Lucas – Eve Lucas (born 1973)
- Elvebakk – Arve Elvebakk (born 1951)
- Elven – Reidar Elven (born 1947)
- Elwes – Henry John Elwes (1846–1922)
- E.L.Wolf – Egbert Ludwigowitsch Wolf (1860–1931)
- E.Martin – Émile Martin (1810–1895)
- E.Martínez – Esteban Martínez (born 1954)
- E.Mayer – Ernest Mayer (1920–2009)
- Emb. – Louis Emberger (1897–1969)
- E.M.Benn. – Eleanor Marion Bennett (born 1942)
- E.Mey. – Ernst Heinrich Friedrich Meyer (1791–1858)
- E.M.Friis – Else Marie Friis (born 1947)
- E.Michener – Ezra Michener (1794–1887)
- É.Miège – Émile Miège (fl. 1910)
- E.M.McClint. – Elizabeth May McClintock (1912–2004)
- E.M.Norman – Eliane Meyer Norman (born 1931)
- E.M.O.Martins – Elena Maria Occioni Martins (born 1948)
- E.Morren – Charles Jacques Édouard Morren (1833–1886)
- E.Morris – Edward Lyman Morris (1870–1913)
- Emory – William Hemsley Emory (1811–1887)
- E.M.Ross – Estelle M. Ross (born 1952)
- E.Nardi – Enio Nardi (born 1942)
- Enderlein – Günther Enderlein (1872–1968)
- Ender – Ernst Eduard Ender (1837–1893)
- Endert – Frederik Hendrik Endert (1891–1953)
- Endl. – Stephan Friedrich Ladislaus Endlicher (1804–1849)
- Endrés – Augustus R. Endrés (1838–1874)
- E.Nelson – Erich Nelson (1897–1980)
- Engel – Franz Engel (1834–1920)
- Engelbrecht – Mischke Engelbrecht (fl. 2018)
- Engelm. – Georg Engelmann (1809–1884)
- Engl. – Heinrich Gustav Adolf Engler (1844–1930)
- E.N.Lowe – Ephriam Noble Lowe (1864–1933)
- Enright – Pat Enright (fl. 2011)
- Enroth – Johannes Enroth (born 1956)
- Ent – Antony Van der Ent (fl. 2014)
- E.O.Campb. – Ella Orr Campbell (1910–2003)
- E.Olivier – (Joseph) Ernst Olivier (1844–1914)
- E.O.Schmidt – Eduard Oscar Schmidt (1823–1886)
- E.Palmer – Elmore Palmer (1839–1909)
- E.P.Bicknell – Eugene Pintard Bicknell (1859–1925)
- E.Peter – Elfriede Peter (born 1905)
- E.Phillips – Edwin Percy Phillips (1884–1967)
- Epling – Carl Clawson Epling (1894–1968)
- E.P.Perrier – Eugène Pierre Perrier de la Bâthie (1825–1916)
- E.Pritz. – Ernst Georg Pritzel (1875–1948)
- E.P.Wright – Edward Perceval (Percival) Wright (1834–1910)
- Erdman – Kimball Stewart Erdman (born 1937)
- Erdmann – Carl Gottfried Erdmann (1774–1835)
- Erdtman – Otto Gunnar Elias Erdtman (1897–1973)
- E.Reid – Eleanor Mary Wynne-Edwards Reid (1860–1953)
- E.Rev. – Elisée Reverchon (1835–1914)
- E.R.Farr – Ellen R. Farr (born 1941)
- Ericsson – Stefan Ericsson (1954–2015)
- Ericzjan – A. A. Ericzjan (fl. 1960)
- E.R.Noble – Elmer Ray Noble (1909–2001)
- Ernst – Adolf Ernst (1832–1899)
- E.Robson – Edward Robson (1763–1813)
- E.Rosén – Eberhard Rosén (1714–1796)
- Er.Rosen – Eric von Rosen (1879–1948)
- E.R.Saunders – Edith Rebecca Saunders (1865–1945)
- Erst – Andrey Erst (fl. 2010)
- Ertter – Barbara Jean Ertter (born 1953)
- E.Sabine – Edward Sabine (1788–1883)
- E.Salisb. – Edward James Salisbury (1886–1978)
- E.S.Anderson – Edgar Shannon Anderson (1897–1969)
- E.S.Barton – Ethel Sarel Barton (1864–1922)
- E.S.Burgess – Edward Sandford Burgess (1855–1928)
- E.Schenk – Ernst Schenk (1880–1965)
- E.Schiem. – Elisabeth Schiemann (1881–1972)
- Eschsch. – Johann Friedrich von Eschscholtz (1793–1831)
- Eshbaugh – W. Hardy Eshbaugh (born 1936)
- E.Sheld. – Edmund Perry Sheldon (1869–1947)
- E.Simon – Eugène Ernest Simon (1871–1967)
- E.Small – Ernest Small (born 1940)
- E.S.Marshall – Edward Shearburn Marshall (1858–1919)
- E.S.Martins – Eurico Sampaio Martins (born 1944)
- Esper – Eugenius Johann Christoph Esper (1742–1810)
- Espinosa – Marcial Ramón Espinosa Bustos (1874–1959)
- E.S.Salmon – Ernest Stanley Salmon (1871–1959)
- Esser – Hans-Joachim Esser (born 1960)
- Essig – Frederick Burt Essig (born 1947)
- E.S.Steele – Edward Strieby Steele (1850–1942)
- Esterh. – Elsie Elizabeth Esterhuysen (1912–2006)
- Esteves – Eddie Esteves Pereira (born 1939)
- E.T.Barthol. – Elbert Thomas Bartholomew (1878–1967)
- E.T.Geddes – Elizabeth T. Geddes (fl. 1927–1932)
- Ether. – Robert Etheridge, Jr. (1847–1920)
- E.Thurst. – Edgar Thurston (1855–1935)
- Etl. – Andreas Ernst Etlinger (1756–1785)
- E.T.Newton – Edwin Tulley (Tully) Newton (1840–1930)
- Ettingsh. – Constantin von Ettingshausen (1826–1897)
- Euphrasén – Bengt Anders Euphrasén (1756–1796)
- E.Vilm. – Elisa de Vilmorin (1826–1868)
- Ewan – Joseph Ewan (1909–1999)
- Ewart – Alfred James Ewart (1872–1937)
- E.Watson – Elba Emanuel Watson (1871–1936)
- E.W.B.Chase – Ethel Winifred Bennett Chase (1877–1949)
- E.W.Berry – Edward Wilber Berry (1875–1945)
- E.W.Herv. – Eliphalet Williams Hervey (1834–1925)
- E.Willm. – Ellen Ann Willmott (1858–1934)
- E.Wimm. – Franz Elfried Wimmer (1881–1961)
- E.Winkel – Esmée Winkel (fl. 2013)
- E.W.Jones – Eustace Wilkinson Jones (1909–1992)
- E.W.Nelson – Edward William Nelson (1855–1934)
- E.W.Sm. – Elmer William Smith (1920-1981)
- Exell – Arthur Wallis Exell (1901–1993)
- E.Y.Dawson – Elmer Yale Dawson (1918–1966)
- Eyde – Richard H. Eyde (1928–1990)
- Eyles – Frederick Eyles (1864–1937)
- Eyma – Pierre Joseph Eyma (1903–1945)
- Eyre – William Leigh Williamson Eyre (1841–1914)
- E.Z.Bailey – Ethel Zoe Bailey (1889–1983)

== F ==
Contents: Top	A	B	C	D	E F	G	H	I J	K L	M	N O	P	Q R	S	T U V	W X Y Z

- F.A.Barkley – Fred Alexander Barkley (1908–1989)
- F.A.Bartlett – Francis Alonzo Bartlett (1882–1963)
- F.A.Bauer – Franz (Francis) Andreas Bauer (1758–1840)
- Fabr. – Philipp Conrad Fabricius (1714–1774)
- Fábry – Igor Fábry (1900–1982)
- Fabris – Humberto Antonio Fabris (1924–1976)
- Faccenda – Kevin Faccenda (fl. 2024)
- F.A.C.Weber – Frédéric Albert Constantin Weber (1830–1903)
- Faegri – Knut Fægri (or Knut Faegri) (1909–2001)
- Fahn – Avraham (Abraham) Fahn (1916–2012)
- Fairon-Dem. – Muriel Fairon-Demaret (fl. 1986)
- F.Albers – Focke Albers (born 1940)
- Falc. – Hugh Falconer (1808–1865)
- Falck – Richard Falck (1868–1955)
- Falk – Johan Peter (Pehr) Falk (1733–1774)
- Falkenb. – Paul Falkenberg (1848–1925)
- F.Allam. – (Frédérique) Frédéric-Louis Allamand (1735–after 1803)
- Fanning – Una Fanning (fl. 1990)
- F.Aresch. – Frederic Wilhelm Christian Areschoug (1830–1908)
- Farges – Paul Guillaume Farges (1844–1912)
- Farjon – Aljos Farjon (born 1946)
- Farl. – William Gilson Farlow (1844–1919)
- Farmar – Leo Farmar (1878–1907)
- F.A.Rodway – Frederick Arthur Rodway (1880–1956)
- F.A.Rogers – Frederick Arundel Rogers (1876–1944)
- Farrer – Reginald John Farrer (1880–1920)
- Farron – Claude Farron (born 1935)
- Farw. – Oliver Atkins Farwell (1867–1944)
- Fassat. – Olga Fassatiová (1924–2011)
- Fassett – Norman Carter Fassett (1900–1954)
- Favre – Louis Favre (1822–1904)
- Fawc. – William Fawcett (1851–1926)
- Faxon – Charles Edward Faxon (1846–1918)
- Fayod – Victor Fayod (1860–1900)
- F.Barros – Fábio de Barros (born 1956)
- F.B.Forbes – Francis Blackwell Forbes (1839–1908)
- F.Bolle – Friedrich Franz August Albrecht Bolle (1905–1999)
- F.Bolus – Frank Bolus (1870–1945)
- F.Boos – Franz Boos (1753–1832)
- F.Br. – Forest Buffen Harkness Brown (1873–1954)
- F.Brachet – Flavien Brachet (died 1910)
- F.Buyss. – François du Buysson (1825–1906)
- F.B.White – Francis Buchanan White (1842–1894)
- F.Cels – François Cels (1771–1832)
- F.C.Gates – Frank Caleb Gates (1887–1955)
- F.Chapm. – Frederick Chapman (1864–1943)
- F.C.How – Foon Chew How (1908–1959)
- F.C.Küpper – Frithjof C. Küpper (fl. 2022)
- F.Conti – Fabio Conti (born 1961)
- F.C.Quinn – F. C. Quinn (fl. 1990)
- F.Cuvier – Georges-Frédéric Cuvier (1773–1838)
- F.D.Bowers – Frank Dana Bowers (1936–2019)
- F.Delaroche – François Delaroche (1780–1813)
- F.Dietr. – Friedrich Gottlieb Dietrich (1768–1850)
- F.Duncan – Fred Duncan (fl. 1991)
- F.E.Boynton – Frank Ellis Boynton (1859–1942)
- Fed. – Andrey Aleksandrovich Fedorov (1908–1987)
- Fedde – Friedrich Karl Georg Fedde (1873–1942)
- F.E.Drouet – Francis Elliott Drouet (1907–1982)
- Fée – Antoine Laurent Apollinaire Fée (1789–1874)
- F.E.Fritsch – Felix Eugen Fritsch (1879–1954)
- Feinbrun – Naomi Feinbrun (1900–1995)
- Feldman – Moshe Feldman (fl. 1978)
- F.E.Leyb. (also Leibold) – Friedrich Ernst Leibold (1804–1864) (surname also spelled "Leybold"; not to be confused with botanist Friedrich Leybold (1827–1879))
- Felger – Richard Stephen Felger (fl. 1968)
- F.E.Lloyd – Francis Ernst Lloyd (1868–1947)
- Fendler – Augustus Fendler (1813–1883)
- Fenu – Giuseppe Fenu (fl. 2012)
- Fenzl – Eduard Fenzl (1808–1879)
- Ferd.Schneid. – Ferdinand Schneider (1834–1882)
- Fernald – Merritt Lyndon Fernald (1873–1950)
- Fern.Alonso – José Luis Fernández Alonso (born 1959)
- Fernando – Edwino S. Fernando (born 1953)
- Fern.-Vill. – Celestino Fernández-Villar (1838–1907)
- Ferreras – Ulysses Flores Ferreras (born 1977)
- Ferreyra – Ramón Alejandro Ferreyra (1910–2005)
- Ferry – René Joseph Justin Ferry (1845–1924)
- Fessel – Hans Fessel (born 1929)
- Feuillée – Louis Éconches Feuillée (Feuillet) (1660–1732)
- Feuillet – Christian Patrice Georges-André Feuillet (born 1948)
- F.F.Blackman – Frederick Blackman (1866–1947)
- F.Fleisch. – Franz von Fleischer (1801–1878)
- F.Forest – Felix Forest (born 1972)
- F.Friedmann – Francis Friedmann (born 1941)
- F.Fromm – Franz Fromm (fl. 1905)
- F.G.Mey. – Frederick Gustav Meyer (1917–2006)
- F.G.Wallace – Franklin Gerhard Wallace (1909–1995)
- F.Haage – Friedrich Ferdinand Adolph Haage (1859–1930)
- F.Hanb. – Frederick Janson Hanbury (1851–1938)
- F.Harper – Francis Harper (1886–1972)
- F.H.Brandt – Fred H. Brandt (1908–1994)
- F.H.Chen – Chen Feng Huai (Hwai) (1900–1993)
- F.Heim – Frédéric Louis Heim (1869–1962)
- F.Heller – Franz Xaver Heller (1775–1840)
- F.H.Hellw. – Frank H. Hellwig (born 1958)
- F.H.Lewis – Frank Harlan Lewis (1919–2008)
- F.H.Perring – Franklyn Hugh Perring (1927–2003)
- F.H.Wigg. – Friedrich Heinrich Wiggers (1746–1811)
- Ficalho – Franciso Manoel Carlos de Mello de Ficalho (1837–1903)
- Fieber – Franz Xaver Fieber (1807–1872)
- Fiebrig – Karl August Gustav Fiebrig (1869–1951)
- Field – Henry Claylands Field (1825–1912)
- Fielding – Henry Barron Fielding (1805–1851)
- Figlar – Richard B. Figlar (fl. 2000)
- Filat. – Anna A. Filatenko (born 1937)
- Finet – Achille Eugène Finet (1863–1913)
- Finl. – George Finlayson (1790–1823)
- Finschow – Günter Finschow (1926–2020)
- Fintelm. – Gustav Adolf Fintelmann (1803–1871)
- Fiori – Adriano Fiori (1865–1950)
- Fior.-Mazz. – Elisabetta Fiorini-Mazzanti (1799–1879)
- Fisch. – Friedrich Ernst Ludwig von Fischer (1782–1854)
- Fisch.-Benz. – Rudolf J. D. von Fischer-Benzon (1839–1911)
- Fisch.-Oost. – Carl von Fischer-Ooster (1807–1875)
- Fisch.Waldh. – Alexander Gregorevich Fischer von Waldheim (1803–1884)
- Fitch – Walter Hood Fitch (1817–1892)
- Fitschen – Jost Fitschen (1869–1947)
- Fitzg. – Robert D. FitzGerald (middle name David or Desmond) (1830–1892)
- F.J.A.Morris – Francis John A. Morris (1869–1949)
- F.J.F.Shaw – Frederick John Freshwater Shaw (1885–1936)
- F.J.Herm. – Frederick Joseph Hermann (1906–1987)
- F.J.Pritch. – Frederick John Pritchard (1874–1931)
- F.J.Schultz – Franz Johann Schultz (fl. 1785–1847)
- F.K.Mey. – Friedrich Karl Meyer (1926-2012)
- Flagey – Camille Flagey (1837–1898)
- Flahault – Charles Flahault (1852–1935)
- Flann – Christina Flann (born 1974)
- F.L.Bauer – Ferdinand Lucas (Lukas) Bauer (1760–1826)
- F.Lees – Frederick Arnold Lees (1847–1921)
- F.Lens – Frederic Lens (fl. 2023)
- Fleming – John Fleming (1785–1857)
- F.L.Erickson – Frederica Lucy "Rica" Erickson (1908–2009)
- Flerow – Alexandr Fedorovich Flerow (1872–1960)
- F.Lestib. – François Joseph Lestiboudois (1759–1815)
- Fletcher – James Fletcher (1852–1908)
- F.L.Freeman – Florence Lucinda Freeman (1912–1999)
- Flickinger – Jonathan A. Flickinger (fl. 2018)
- Flinders – Matthew Flinders (1774–1814)
- F.L.Martin – Floyd Leonard Gabriel Martin (1909–1994)
- Flod. – Björn Gustaf Oscar Floderus (1867–1941)
- Flörke – Heinrich Gustav Flörke (1764–1835)
- Flot. – Julius von Flotow (1788–1856)
- F.L.Sarg. – Frederick LeRoy Sargent (1863–1928)
- F.L.Tai – Fung Lan Tai (1893–1973)
- F.Ludw. – Friedrich Ludwig (1851–1918)
- Flueck. – Friedrich August Flückiger (1828–1894)
- Flüggé – Johannes Flüggé (1775–1816)
- Flyr – Lowell David Flyr (1937–1971)
- F.Maek. – Fumio Maekawa (1908–1984)
- F.M.Bailey – Frederick Manson Bailey (1827–1915)
- F.Michx. – François Andre Michaux (1770–1855)
- F.M.Knuth – Frederik Marcus Knuth (1904–1970)
- F.M.Leight. – Frances Margaret Leighton (later Isaac) (1909–2006) (Isaac is also used)
- F.Muell. – Ferdinand von Mueller (1825–1896)
- F.M.Vázquez – Francisco María Vázquez (born 1964)
- F.N.Meyer – Frank Nicholas Meyer (surnamed Meijer before 1908) (1875–1918)
- F.N.Williams – Frederic Newton Williams (1862–1923)
- F.Nyl. – Fredrik Nylander (1820–1880)
- Fobe – Frederich Fobe (1864–1946)
- Focke – Wilhelm Olbers Focke (1834–1922)
- Foëx – Gustave Louis Émile Foëx (1844–1906)
- Foldats – Ernesto Foldats Andins (1925–2003)
- Fomin – Aleksandr Vasiljevich Fomin (1869–1935)
- Fontoura – Talita Fontoura (fl. 2012)
- Font Quer – Pius Font i Quer (1888–1964)
- Forbes – John Forbes (1799–1823)
- Ford – Neridah Clifton Ford (1926–2006)
- Forde – Neville Forde (1933-2018)
- Foreman – Donald Bruce Foreman (1945–2004)
- Forero – Enrique Forero (born 1942)
- Forman – Lewis Leonard Forman (1929–1998)
- Forrest – George Forrest (1873–1932)
- Forrester – Susan G. Forrester (fl. 2007)
- Forssk. – Peter Forsskål (1732–1763)
- Forsstr. – Johan Erik Forsström (1775–1824)
- Forsyth – William Forsyth (1737–1804)
- Forsyth f. – William Forsyth Jr. (?1772–1835)
- Fortune – Robert Fortune (1812–1880)
- Fosberg – Francis Raymond Fosberg (1908–1993)
- Foster – Michael Foster (1836–1907)
- Foucaud – Julien Foucaud (1847–1904)
- Foug. – Auguste Denis Fougeroux de Bondaroy (1732–1789)
- Fourc. – Henry Georges Fourcade (1865–1948)
- Fourcy – Michel-Eugène Lefébure de Fourcy (1812–1889)
- Fourn. – Eugène Pierre Nicolas Fournier (1834–1884)
- Fourr. – Jules Pierre Fourreau (1844–1871)
- Fox – T. Colcott Fox (1849–1916)
- Foxw. – Frederick William Foxworthy (1877–1950)
- F.Patt. – Flora Wambaugh Patterson (1847–1928)
- F.Phil. – Federico Philippi (1838–1910)
- F.Picard – François Picard (1879–1939)
- F.P.Metcalf – Franklin Post Metcalf (1892–1955)
- Fr. – Elias Magnus Fries (1794–1878)
- Fraas – Carl Nicolaus Fraas (1810–1875)
- Franch. – Adrien René Franchet (1834–1900)
- Francis – George William Francis (1800–1865)
- Franco – João Manuel Antonio do Amaral Franco (1921–2009)
- Franc.-Ort. – Javier Francisco-Ortega (born 1958)
- Franzén – Roy Franzén (born 1957)
- Frapp. – Charles Frappier (1813–1885)
- Fraser – John Fraser (1750–1811)
- Fraser f. – John Fraser Jr. (c. 1780–1852)
- Fraser-Jenk. – Christopher Roy Fraser-Jenkins (born 1948)
- Frauenf. – Georg von Frauenfeld (1807–1873)
- F.R.Chapm. – Frederick Revans Chapman (1849–1936)
- Freckmann – Robert W. Freckmann (born 1939)
- Frederick – Lafayette Frederick (1923–2018)
- Frege – Christian August Frege (1758–1834)
- Freire-Fierro – Alina Freire-Fierro (born 1964)
- Frém. – John C. Frémont (1813–1890)
- Frenzel – Johannes Frenzel (1858–1897)
- Fresen. – Johann Baptist Georg Wolfgang Fresenius (1808–1866)
- Freudenst. – John V. Freudenstein (born 1963)
- Freyer – Heinrich Freyer (1802–1866)
- Freyn – Josef Franz Freyn (1845–1903)
- Freyr. – Georg Wilhelm Freyreiss (1789–1825)
- Frez. – Amédée-François Frézier (1682–1773)
- Frič – Alberto Vojtěch Frič (1882–1944)
- Friedrich – Hans Christian Friedrich (1925–1992)
- Friis – Ib Friis (born 1945)
- Fritsch – Karl Fritsch (1864–1934)
- F.Ritter – Friedrich Ritter (1898–1989)
- Friv. – Imre (Emerich) Frivaldszky von Frivald (1799–1870)
- Frodin – David Gamman Frodin (1940–2019)
- Froel. – Joseph Aloys von Froelich (1766–1841)
- Fronius – Franz Friedrich Fronius (1829–1886)
- F.Rose – Francis Rose (1921–2006)
- Fr.Römer – Fritz Römer (1866–1909)
- Fr.Schneid. – Frits Schneider (1926–2003)
- F.Rudolphi – Friedrich Karl Ludwig Rudolphi (1801–1849)
- Frye – Theodore Christian Frye (1869–1962)
- Fryer – Alfred Fryer (1826–1912)
- Fryxell – Paul Arnold Fryxell (1927–2011)
- F.Schmidt – Friedrich Carl Fedor Bogdanovich Schmidt (1832–1908)
- F.Schmitz – Friedrich Schmitz (1850–1895)
- F.Stein – Samuel Friedrich Nathaniel Ritter von Stein (1818–1885)
- F.S.Wagner – Florence Signaigo Wagner (1919–2019)
- F.T.Brooks – Frederick Tom (Thom, Thomas) Brooks (1882–1952)
- F.T.Hubb. – Frederic Tracy Hubbard (1875–1962)
- F.Towns. – Frederick Townsend (1822–1905)
- F.Turner – Frederick Turner (1852–1939)
- F.T.Wang – Fa Tsuan Wang (1899–1985)
- Fuckel (also Fuck.) – Karl Wilhelm Gottlieb Leopold Fuckel (1821–1876)
- Fuentes – Francisco Fuentes Maturana (1876–1934)
- Fuertes – Javier Fuertes (born 1960)
- Fukuhara – Tatsundo Fukuhara (fl. 1997)
- Fukuoka – Nobuyuki Fukuoka (born 1904)
- Fukuy. – Noriaki Fukuyama (1912–1946)
- Fulford – Margaret Hannah Fulford (1904–1999)
- Fuljer – Filip Fuljer (fl. 2022)
- Funck – Heinrich Christian Funck (1771–1839)
- Furtado – Caetano Xavier Furtado (1897–1980)
- Furuki – Tatsuwo Furuki (fl. 1989)
- F.Vierh. – Friedrich Vierhapper (1844–1903) (father of Friedrich Karl Max Vierhapper (1876–1932))
- F.Voigt – Friedrich Siegmund Voigt (1781–1850)
- F.W.Andrews – Frederick William Andrews (died 1961)
- F.Weber – Friedrich Weber (1781–1823)
- F.Wettst. – Fritz von Wettstein (1895–1945)
- F.W.Gray – Frederick William Gray (1878–1960)
- F.White – Frank White (1927–1994)
- F.Wilson – Francis Robert Muter Wilson (1832–1903)
- F.Wirtg. – Ferdinand Paul Wirtgen (1848–1924)
- F.W.L.Suckow – Friedrich Wilhelm Ludwig Suckow (1770–1838)
- F.W.Schmidt – Franz Wilibald Schmidt (1764–1796)
- F.W.Schultz – Friedrich Wilhelm Schultz (1804–1876)
- F.W.Wakef. – F.W. Wakefield (fl. 1922)
- F.W.Went – Frits Warmolt Went (1903–1990)
- F.W.Xing – Fu Wu Xing (born 1956)
- F.Y.Liu – Fang Yuan Liu (fl. 1988)
- Fyson – Philip Furley Fyson (1877–1948)
- F.Zenker – Friedrich Albert von Zenker (1825–1898)

== G–Z ==
Contents: Top	A	B	C	D	E F	G	H	I J	K L	M	N O	P	Q R	S	T U V	W X Y Z

To find entries for G–Z, use the table of contents above.

== See also ==
- List of South African plant botanical authors
- List of botanists
- Category:Botanists
- List of Russian botanists
- List of zoologists by author abbreviation
