= Suckow (surname) =

Suckow is a German surname. Notable people with the surname include:

- Friedrich Wilhelm Ludwig Suckow (1770–1838), German naturalist, son of George Adolph Suckow
- Georg Adolf Suckow (1751–1813), German physicist, chemist, mineralogist, mining engineer and naturalist, father of Friedrich Wilhelm Ludwig Suckow
- Ruth Suckow (1892–1960), American author
- Wendel Suckow (born 1967), American luger
