= Vierhapper =

Vierhapper is a surname. Notable people with the surname include:

- Friedrich Karl Max Vierhapper (1876–1932), Austrian plant collector
- Friedrich Vierhapper (1844–1903), Austrian amateur botanist
