= John Fryer (entomologist) =

English entomologist (1886–1948)

Sir John Claud Fortescue Fryer KBE FRS FRSE (13 August 1886 – 22 November 1948) was an English entomologist. He was president of the Royal Entomological Society from 1938 to 1939 and was a fellow of the Royal Society.

== Life ==
He was born at The Priory in Chatteris, Cambridgeshire, as the son of Herbert Fortescue Fryer, a farmer and amateur entomologist, and his wife Margaret Katherine Terry. He was educated at Rugby School and Gonville and Caius College, Cambridge. Like his father and his uncle, the naturalist Alfred Fryer, his main interest was in natural history.

In 1908 and 1909, he spent time in the Seychelles and Aldabra Islands on a Percy Sladen Trust expedition to study the fauna and physiography. In 1914, he was appointed the first entomologist at the Board of Agriculture and Fisheries and in 1920 was appointed director of the Plant Pathology Laboratory at Harpenden. He was awarded an OBE in 1929. He became secretary of the Agricultural Research Council in 1944.

He was knighted KBE in 1946 and elected a fellow of the Royal Society in March 1948. His application citation read: "[Fryer] is an entomologist, his early researches on the genetics of mimetic polymorphism in Papilio polytes are classic. He is distinguished for his scientific public service to Agriculture. As the first entomologist employed by the Board of Agriculture, and later as Director of the Board's Plant Pathology Laboratory he established the advisory and quarantine services in this country on such sound scientific lines that they enabled the great development of agriculture during the war to take place. During the war as first secretary to the Agricultural Improvement Council, he rendered important service to scientific agriculture, and now as Secretary to the Agricultural Research Council is playing a large part in post-war development in this field."

In March 1948 he was also elected a fellow of the Royal Society of Edinburgh His proposers were Sir William Wright Smith, Alan William Greenwood, James Ritchie, and John Russell Greig.

He died suddenly from pneumonia in London in November 1948.

== Family ==
Fryer married Constance Joan Denny-Cooke in 1919. They had a daughter, Margret Katherine Fryer in 1920, and a son, John Denny Fryer in 1922.
