= Johan Ångström =

Swedish bryologist (1813–1879)

Johan Ångström (24 September 1813, Lögdö, Medelpad – 19 January 1879, Örnsköldsvik) was a Swedish medical doctor and bryologist.

He obtained his education in Uppsala, and later practiced medicine in the communities of Lycksele and Örnsköldsvik. With Fredrik Nylander (1820-1880), he conducted botanical investigations in Lapland, Finland and Karelia.

The moss genus Aongstroemia (Bruch & Schimp., 1846) in named in his honor. As a taxonomist, he was the binomial authority of several plants within the genus Botrychium.

== Selected works ==
- Dispositio muscorum in Scandinavia : hucusque cognitorum, 1842.
- Symbolae ad Bryologiam Scandinavicam, 1844.
- Primae lineae muscorum cognoscendorum, 1876.
