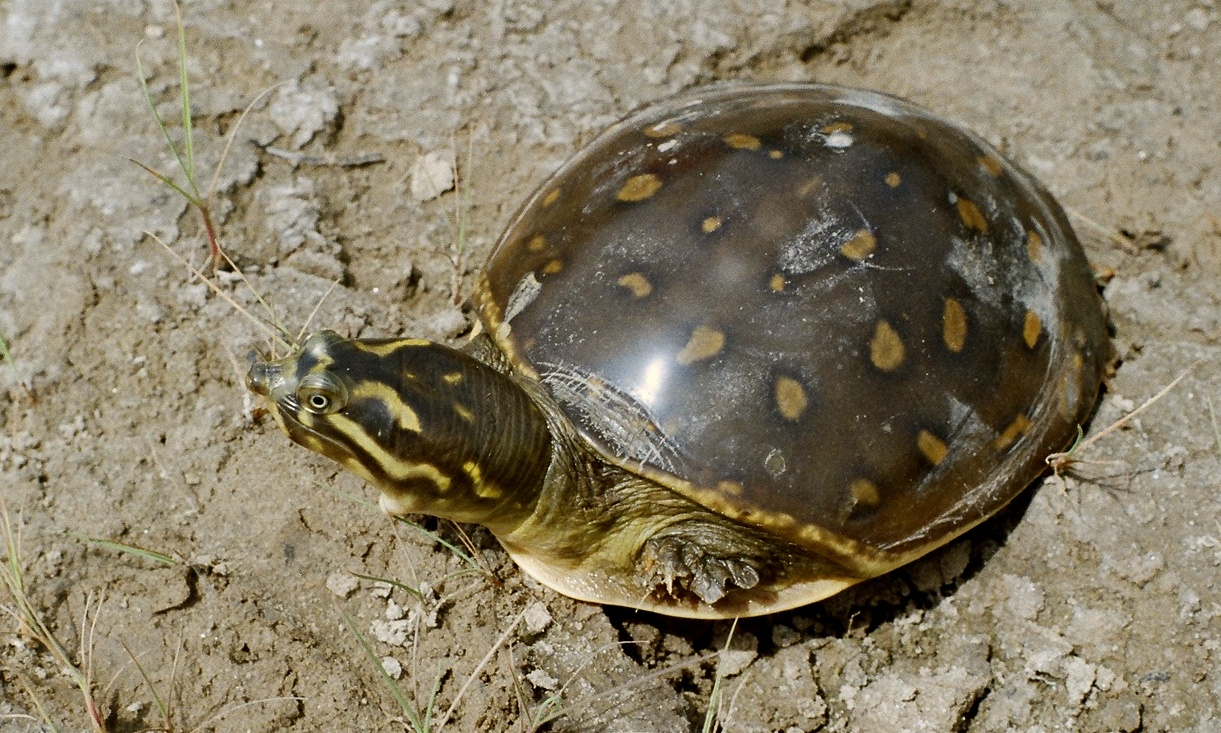
- L. p. andersoni at Rajaji National Park, India

Conservation status
- Vulnerable (IUCN 3.1)
- CITES Appendix II

Scientific classification
- Kingdom: Animalia
- Phylum: Chordata
- Class: Reptilia
- Order: Testudines
- Suborder: Cryptodira
- Family: Trionychidae
- Genus: Lissemys
- Species: L. punctata

Binomial name
- Lissemys punctata (Lacépède, 1788)

Subspecies
- L. p. andersoni; L. p. punctata

Synonyms
- List: Testudo punctata Lacépède, 1788; Testudo granulosa Suckow, 1798; Testudo scabra Latreille, 1801; Testudo granosa Schoepff, 1801; Testudo granulata Daudin, 1801; Trionyx coromandelicus É. Geoffroy Saint-Hilaire, 1809; Trionyx granosus — Schweigger, 1812; Trionyx (Emyda) punctatus — Gray, 1831; Emyda punctata — Gray, 1831; Trionyx punctata — Gray, 1832; Cryptopus granosus — A.M.C. Duméril & Bibron, 1835; Emyda vittata W. Peters, 1854; Emyda ceylonensis Gray, 1856; Emyda granosa — Strauch, 1862; Emyda dura Anderson, 1876 (nomen nudum); Emyda [granosa] granosa — Siebenrock, 1909; Emyda granosa ceylonensis — Annandale, 1912; Emyda granosa intermedia Annandale, 1912; Lissemys punctata punctata — M.A. Smith, 1931; Lissemys punctata granosa — M.A. Smith, 1931; Trionyx punctatus granosus — Mertens, L. Müller & Rust, 1934; Trionyx punctatus punctatus — Mertens, L. Müller & Rust, 1934; Lissemys punctata garnosa Rhodes & Dadd, 1968 (ex errore); Lissemys punctata andersoni Webb, 1980; Lissemys punctata andersonii Artner, 2003 (ex errore); Lissemys andersoni — Joseph-Ouni, 2004

= Indian flapshell turtle =

Indian flapshell turtle Temporal range: Miocene to recent, 15.97–0 Ma

Species of freshwater turtle predominant in South Asia

The Indian flapshell turtle (Lissemys punctata) is a freshwater species of turtle found in South Asia. The "flap-shelled" name stems from the presence of femoral flaps located on the plastron. These flaps of skin cover the limbs when they retract into the shell. What protection the flaps offer against predators is unclear. Indian flapshell turtles are widespread and common in the South Asian provinces. It is morphologically an evolutionary link between the softshell and hardshell aquatic turtles. Exploitation for profit and habitat change are threats to their survival.

== Description ==
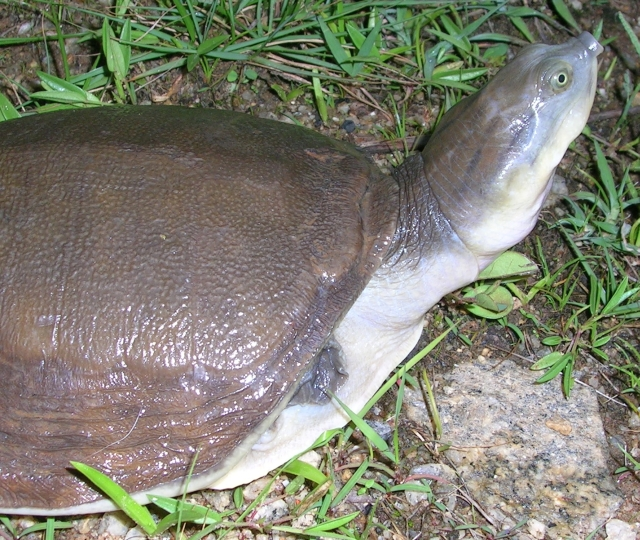
Adult

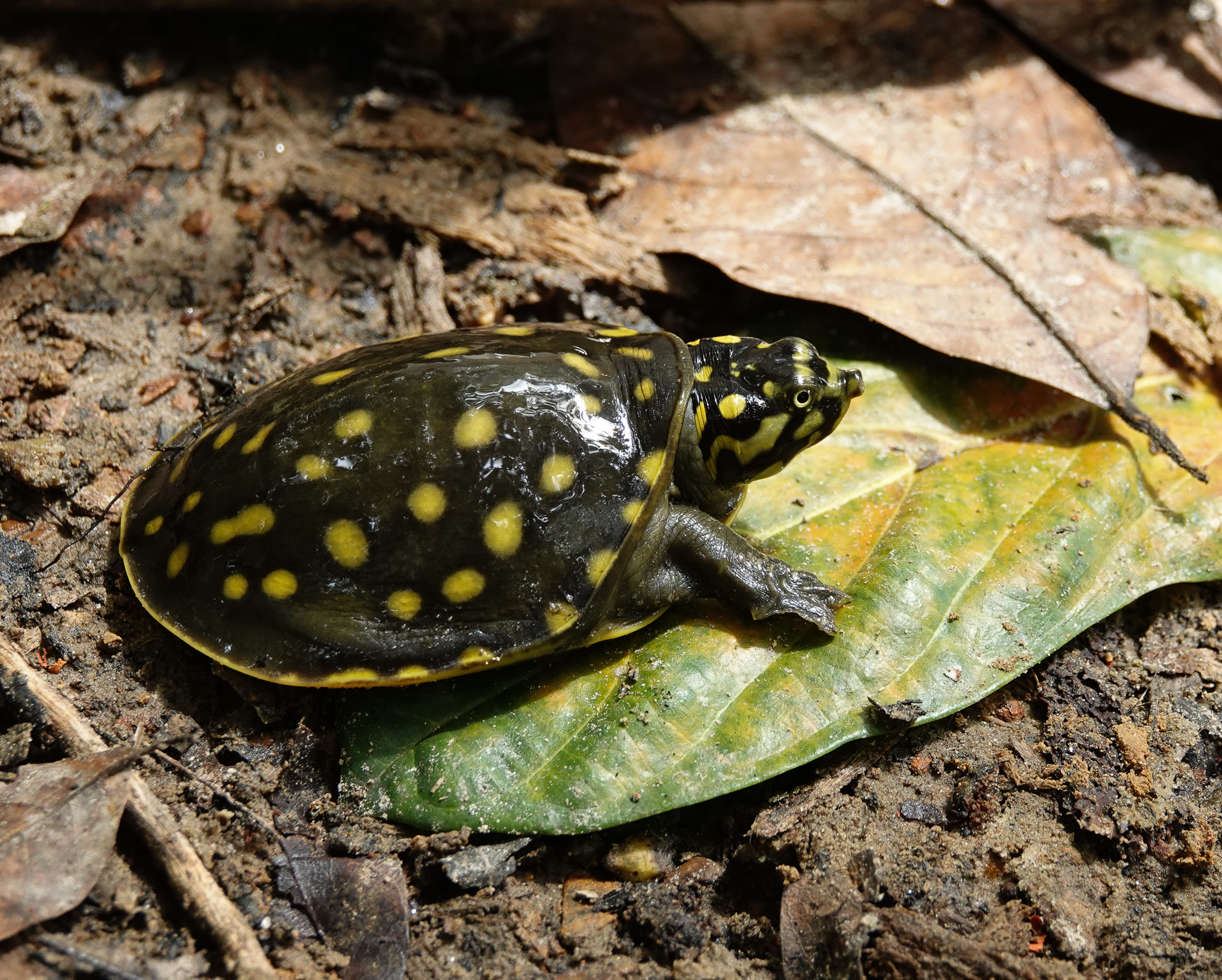
Juvenile

The carapace of L. punctata viewed from above is broadly oval in adults, but more circular in young, widest just anterior to hind limbs. The width of the disc is 77–86% of its length, the carapace is moderately arched, shell height is 35.0–40.5% of carapace length, the margin of the carapace is smooth and slightly flared posteriorly, the marginal bones are not united with the pleurals, the plastron is large but mostly cartilaginous, and its length is 88–97% of the carapace length. A pair of large flaps can be closed over the hind limbs with a smaller flap over tail; seven plastral callosities are present, and the head is large, its width is 21–25% of the carapace width. The nose is short and stout; the nasal septum has no lateral ridge, the edges of the jaws are smooth, the alveolar surfaces are expanded and granular. The claws are large and heavy; the penis is thick and oval, with deep dorsal cleft and four pointed, soft papillae; the tail is very short in both sexes.

The carapace length of L. punctata has been known to range from 240 to 370 mm (9.4 to 14.6 in). The male's size can be up to 23 cm (9 in.), while the female's size can be maximum of around 35 cm (14 in.) .

== Status ==
The Indian flapshell turtle was placed in Appendix I of CITES in 1975 at the proposal of Bangladesh. However, L. p. punctata was the taxon listed, not L. p. andersoni. Subsequent reviews of the literature and available data could find no evidence to support this endangered status. Some scientists now classify L. p. punctata and L. p. andersoni as a single subspecies. This subspecies is the most common aquatic turtle in India. Consequently, the Indian flapshell turtle was removed from the endangered species list in 1983 (48 FR 52740). This action, however, did not affect the turtle's status on Appendix I of CITES. The species was downgraded to Appendix II in 1995.

== Distribution ==
The Indian flapshell turtle is found in Pakistan, India (common in lakes and rivers), Sri Lanka, Nepal, Bangladesh (Indus and Ganges drainages), and Myanmar (Irrawaddy and Salween Rivers). It has been introduced to the Andaman and Nicobar Islands. It is also found in the desert ponds of Rajasthan, where hundreds are killed every year during the dry summers. L. p. andersoni is found in Bangladesh, India, Nepal, and Pakistan. In 2020, a farmer found a yellow flapshell turtle, believed to be an albino version of the species.

Fossils of this species from as early as the Miocene are known from Nepal.

The type locality is given as: "Des grandes Indes" (= continental India); restricted to "Pondicherry, Coromandel Coast, India" (11° 56'N; 79° 53'E, on the southeast coast of India) by Webb (1980).

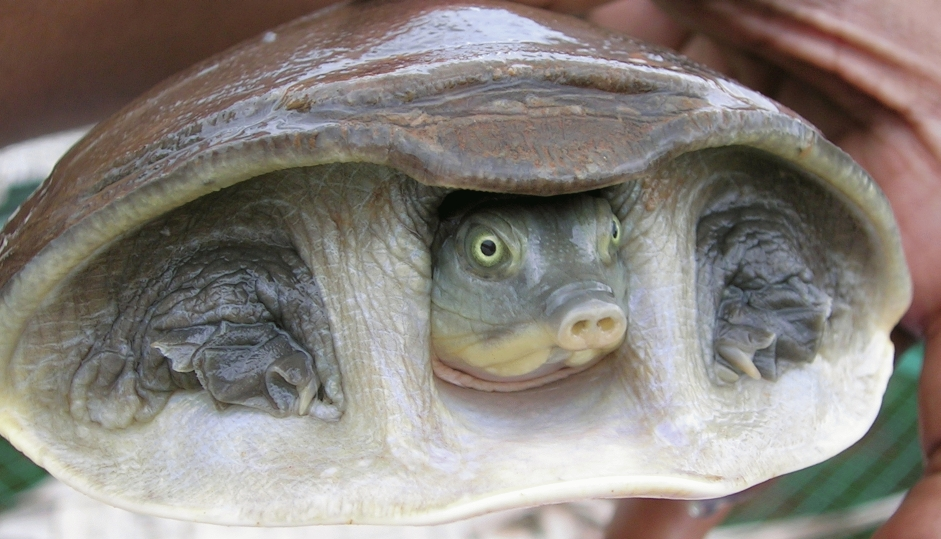
Head and front legs

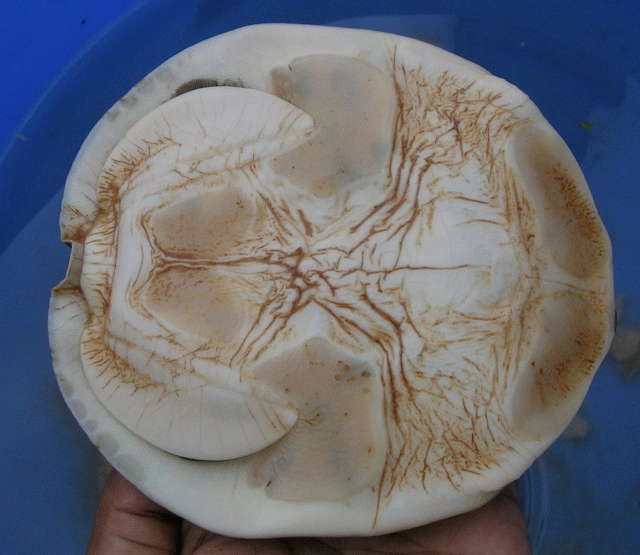
Underside showing the flaps

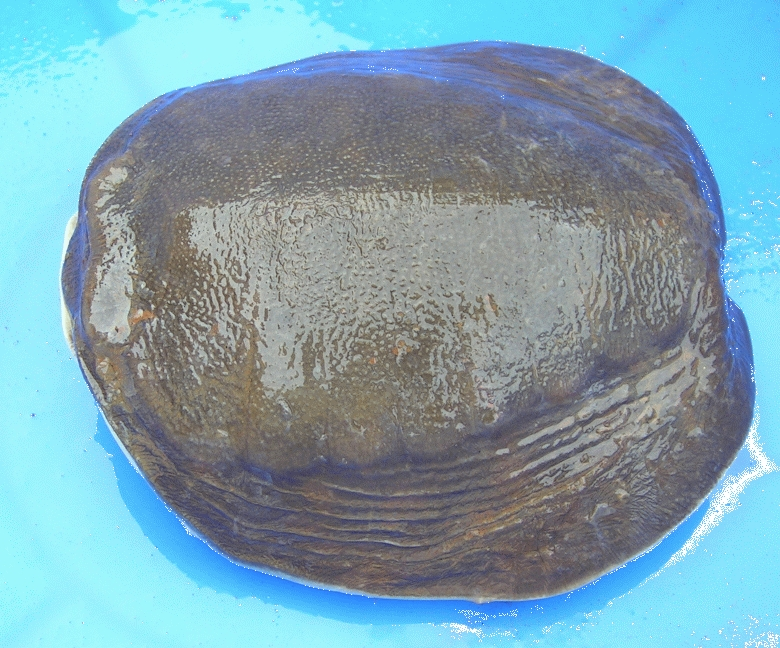
Upperside

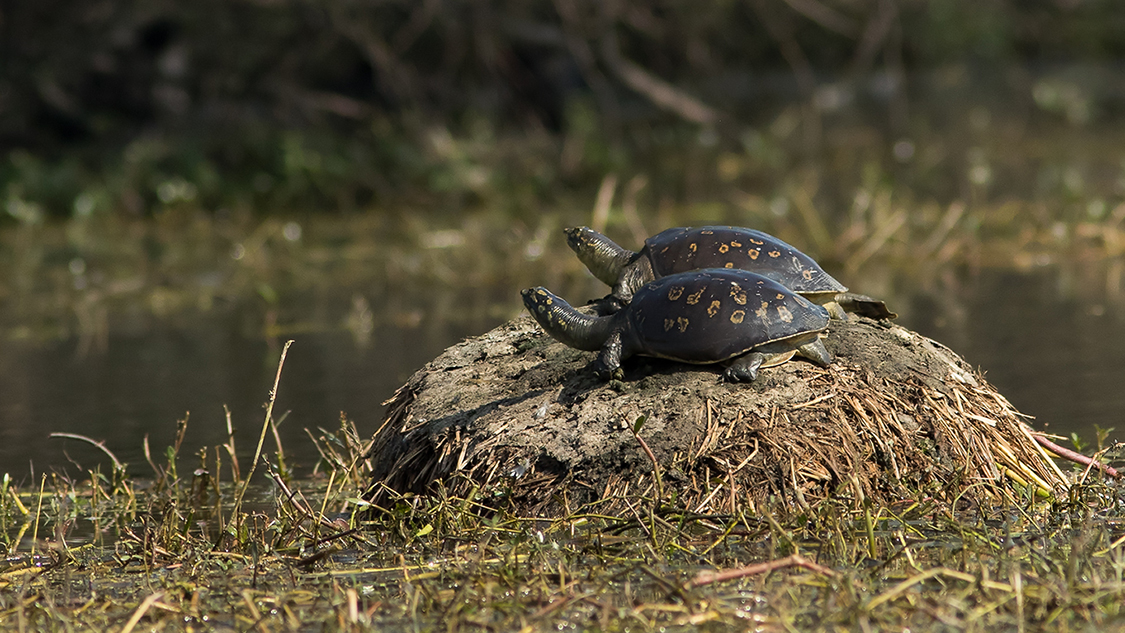
With yellow spots and blotches at Sulthanpur National Park

== Habitat and ecology ==
=== Food ===
The Indian flapshell turtle is known to be omnivorous. Its diet consists of frogs, shrimp, snails, aquatic vegetation, plant leaves, flowers, fruits, grasses, and seeds.

=== Habitat and environmental impact ===
L. punctata lives in the shallow, quiet, often stagnant waters of rivers, streams, marshes, ponds, lakes, irrigation canals, and tanks. Waters with sand or mud bottoms are preferred because of the turtle's tendency to burrow. L. punctata turtle plays an important role to reduce pollution in aquatic ecosystems by feeding on snails, insects, and fragments of dead animals.

=== Drought survival ===
L. punctata is very well adapted, both morphologically and behaviorally, to drought conditions. The turtle uses mainly burrowing and moving from water hole to water hole to avoid desiccation. The femoral flaps that cover the retracted legs help the turtle survive dry conditions. During a time of drought, the turtles enter a time of estivation in an attempt to survive the dry conditions. Although many turtles die during drought conditions, some turtles have been reported to survive up to 160 days.

== Reproduction ==
=== Courtship routines ===
L. punctata becomes reproductively active at age 2 or 3. Courtship and mating behavior is unique. Courtship begins when the male begins stroking the female's carapace with his neck and limbs extended. When receptive, the female faces the male with her neck extended and they begin bobbing their heads vertically three or four times. This behavior is repeated, then mating begins when the female settles to the bottom and is mounted by the male. Near the end of mating, the male releases his grip and rotates to face the opposite direction from her. They remain attached in this position for as long as 15 minutes. During this time, the female may drag the male about. The pair then separates and copulation ends.

=== Nesting ===
Nesting times of L. punctata occur during many periods in the year depending on habitat and location. Generally, they start during the late summer to the monsoon season, which is around June to November. Swampy areas with soil and exposure to sunlight are common nesting sites. Eggs are usually laid two or three times per year in clutches of two to 16. These eggs are buried in soil for protection.

== Specific dangers and threats to species survival ==
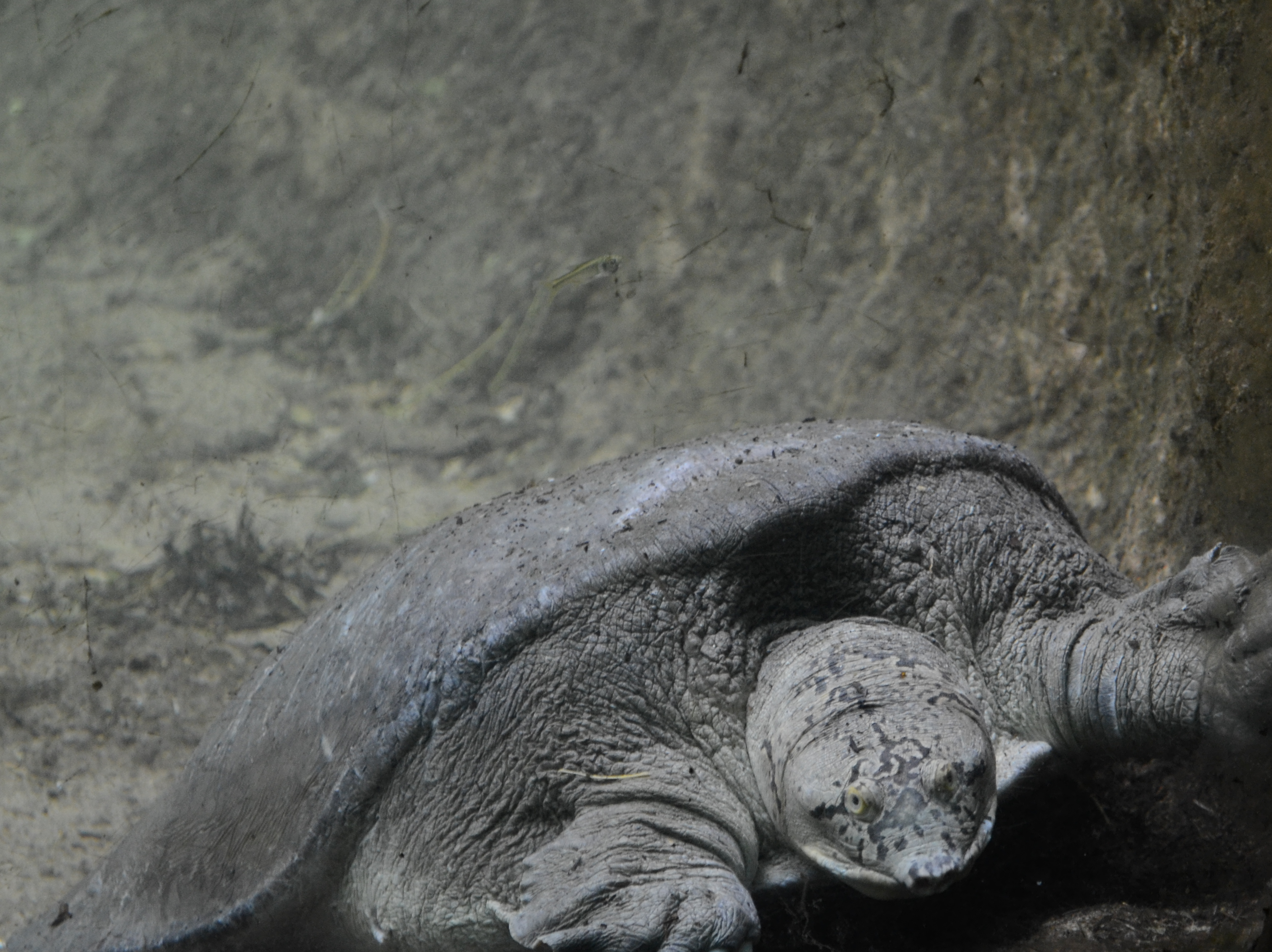
Indian flapshell turtle kept at the Madras Crocodile Bank Trust

=== Economic and environmental factors ===
In many South Asian provinces, freshwater turtles and their eggs are commonly used as a source of protein-rich food. Also, a common myth holds that turtle meat and eggs have aphrodisiac qualities. As a result, these turtles are often exploited as a source of profit. In Bangladesh and India, this is especially evident, as the Indian flapshell turtle is larger and has more meat than other turtles in the area. The value of this meat, along with the efforts in the conservation of this species, has driven the price of meat higher and has led to an increase in the illegal international exploitation and killing of these animals. Changes to the turtle's natural habitat by the construction of dams and barrages, cultivation along river banks, and pollution are also major threats to the survival of this turtle.

=== Fake belief about medicinal value ===
The shell of L. punctata is sometimes believed to have medicinal uses and ground into powder to make traditional medicines, but no scientific proof of efficacy has been found. Basically, this myth helps smugglers to sell them, which is an illegal activity.
