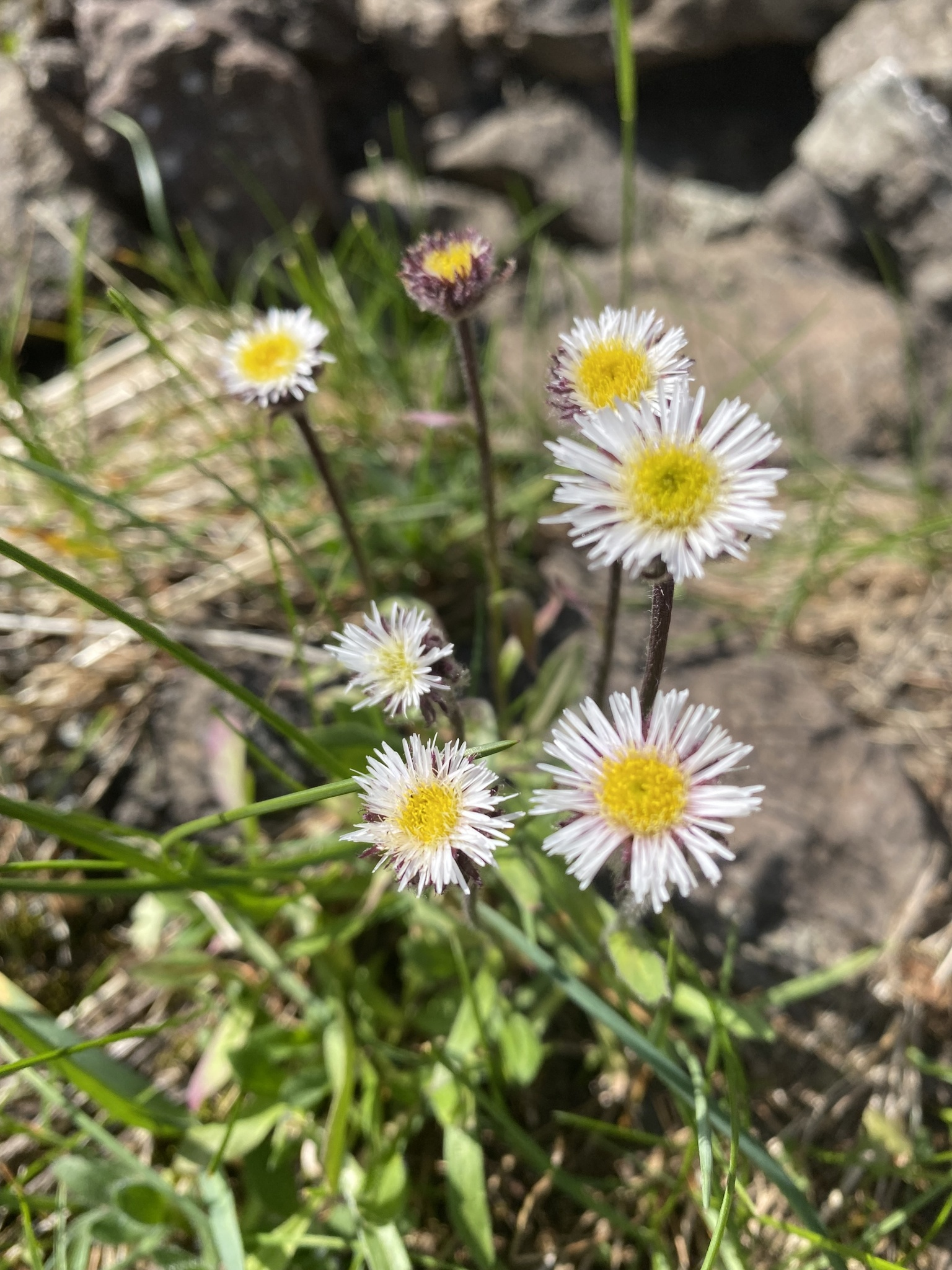

Scientific classification
- Kingdom: Plantae
- Clade: Tracheophytes
- Clade: Angiosperms
- Clade: Eudicots
- Clade: Asterids
- Order: Asterales
- Family: Asteraceae
- Genus: Erigeron
- Species: E. eriocalyx

Binomial name
- Erigeron eriocalyx (Ledeb.) Vierh. 1906

Synonyms
- Erigeron alpinus var. eriocalyx Ledeb. 1833; Erigeron korotkyi Novopokr.; Erigeron uniflorus subsp. eriocalyx (Ledeb.) Á. Löve & D. Löve

= Erigeron eriocalyx =

Species of flowering plant

Erigeron eriocalyx is a Eurasian species of flowering plants in the family Asteraceae.

The species is a widespread flower species in the arctic, subarctic, alpine and subalpine meadows in Russia, Kazakhstan, Mongolia, Inner Mongolia, and Xinjiang.

Erigeron eriocalyx is a perennial, clump-forming herb up to 25 cm (10 inches) tall, forming a branching underground caudex. Its flower heads have violet, purple, lilac, or white ray florets surrounding yellow disc florets.
