= William Sadler Franks =

British astronomer

William Sadler Franks (26 April 1851 in Newark, Nottinghamshire – 19 June 1935 in East Grinstead) was a British astronomer.

Franks was elected to the Royal Astronomical Society on 9 January 1880. From 1890 to 1894 he directed the British Astronomical Association’s Star Colour Section.

He published a catalogue of the colours of 3890 stars.

Franks was employed between 1892 and 1904 by the wealthy amateur astronomer Isaac Roberts as an assistant to support the photographic observations of star clusters and nebulae at Roberts's private observatory at Crowborough in Sussex.

In 1910 he was hired by F. J. Hanbury (of the Allen and Hanburys firm) to work as an observer at Hanbury's private Brockhurst Observatory at East Grinstead in Sussex. He continued his studies of the colours of stars there, and also made micrometer measurements of double stars. In 1923 he won the Jackson-Gwilt Medal of the Royal Astronomical Society.

One of the other observers who used the Brockhurst Observatory with Franks was a teenage Patrick Moore (fourteen years old at Franks's death in a road accident).
