= Carl Heinrich Ebermaier =

German physician and author on medicinal botany

Carl Heinrich Ebermaier (4 February 1802, in Rheda – 1 January 1870, in Düsseldorf) was a German medical doctor and writer on medicinal botany. He was the son of pharmacist/medical doctor Johann Erdwin Christoph Ebermaier (1768-1825).

== Background ==
In 1824 he received his medical doctorate in Berlin, afterwards settling into a medical practice in Düsseldorf. During his career he served as a medical adviser and as a privy councilor.

The plant genus Ebermaiera (family Acanthaceae) is named after him. He collaborated with botanist Theodor Friedrich Ludwig Nees von Esenbeck (1787-1837) on the textbook "Handbuch der medicinisch-pharmaceutischen Botanik".

== Written works ==
- Plantarum papilionacearum : monographiam medicam, 1824
- Ueber den Schwamm der Schädelknochen und die Schwammartigen Auswüchse der harten Hirnhaut, 1829
- Erfahrungen und Ansichten über die Erkenntniss und Behandlung des asiatischen Brechdurchfalls, 1832.
