= Karl Linsbauer =

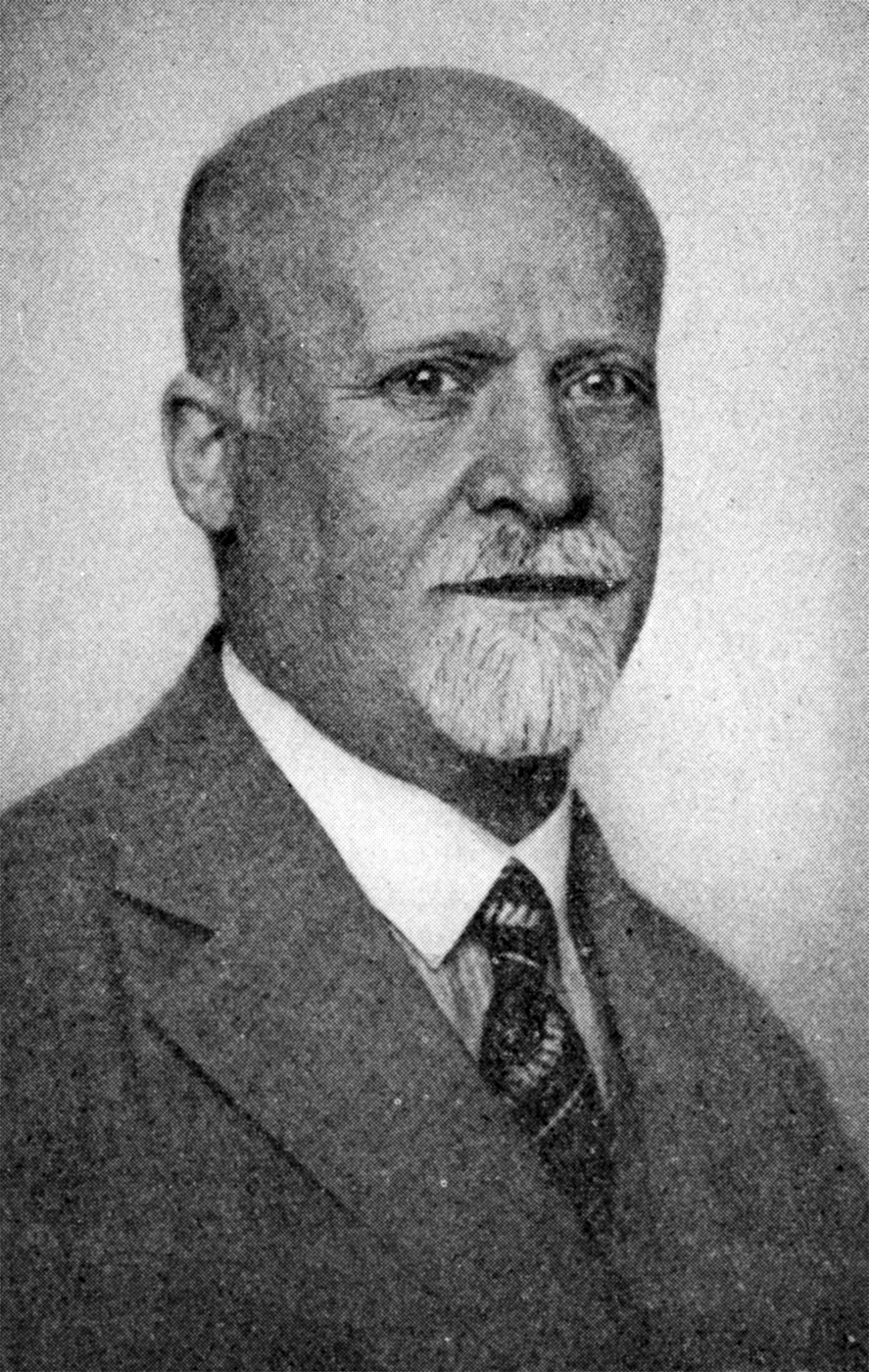
Karl Linsbauer (1872-1934)

Karl Linsbauer (11 October 1872, Vienna – 5 December 1934, Graz) was an Austrian botanist and plant physiologist.

He studied natural sciences at the University of Vienna, where he was a disciple of Julius Wiesner. In 1899 he earned his PhD, obtaining his habilitation several years later in the fields of plant anatomy and physiology (1904). In 1910 he became an associate professor at the University of Czernowitz, relocating the following year to the University of Graz as a successor to Gottlieb Haberlandt.

== Selected works ==
- Bau und Leben der Pflanzen : in zwölf gemeinverständliche Vorträge (with Friedrich Karl Max Vierhapper) Verlag von Carl Konegen, Vienna, (1905) - Construction and biology of plants; in twelve easy-to-understand presentations.
- Wiesner-Festschrift (edited by Linsbauer) Vienna : C. Konegen, (1908) - Julius Wiesner Festschrift on behalf of the "Festkomitee".
- Illustriertes Handwörterbuch der Botanik (with Camillo Karl Schneider) Leipzig, W. Engelmann (1917) - Illustrated dictionary of botany.
- Handbuch der pflanzenanatomie (as editor), Berlin : Verlag von gebruder Borntraeger, (1922- ) - Handbook of plant anatomy.
