= Theodor Friedrich Ludwig Nees von Esenbeck =

German botanist and pharmacologist

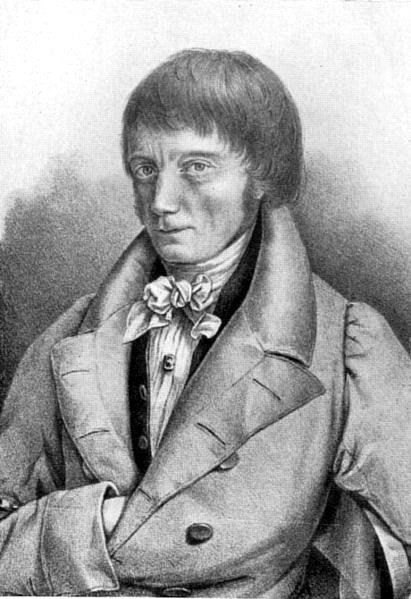
Theodor Nees von Esenbeck

Theodor Friedrich Ludwig Nees von Esenbeck (26 July 1787 – 12 December 1837) was a German botanist and pharmacologist, who was born in Schloss Reichenberg near Reichelsheim (Odenwald). He was a younger brother to naturalist Christian Gottfried Daniel Nees von Esenbeck (1776–1858).

== Career ==
In 1805 Nees von Esenbeck was an apprentice to pharmacist Wilhelm Martius in Erlangen, and in 1811 moved to Basel, where he worked for the Bernoulli family at the Goldenen Apotheke. In 1817 his friend, zoologist Heinrich Kuhl (1797–1821) procured an assignment for him at the University of Leiden as a reader of botany, and shortly afterwards, with the help of botanist Sebald Justinus Brugmans (1763–1819), he held a position at the botanical gardens in Leiden. In 1818 he earned his doctorate at the university, and subsequently moved to Bonn, where he worked at the botanical gardens. In 1827 he attained the title of "full professor" at the University of Bonn, where he was a colleague of Ludolph Christian Treviranus (1779–1864).

Nees von Esenbeck died in Hyères.

Nees von Esenbeck is largely remembered for pharmacological analysis and taxonomy of various medicinal plants. In the mid-1830s, with Philipp Wilhelm Wirtgen (1806–1870) and Ludwig Clamor Marquart (1804–1881), he was co-founder of the Botanischer Verein am Mittel- und Niederrhein (Botanical Society of the Middle and Lower Rhine).

The plant genus Neesia in the subfamily Bombacoideae was named after him by botanist Carl Ludwig Blume (1796–1862).

== Selected writings ==
- Plantae officinales, oder Sammlung officineller Pflanzen, Düsseldorf (1821–1833).
- Sammlung schön blühender Gewächse in lithographierten Abbildungen, für Blumen- und Gartenfreunde, Düsseldorf (1825–1831) - Collection of flowering plants in lithographic illustrations, for flower and garden devotees.
- Handbuch der medicinisch-pharmaceutischen Botanik, Düsseldorf (1830–1832); edited with CH Ebermaier - Handbook of medico-botany pharmaceuticals.
- Plantae medicinales, Düsseldorf 1833
- Genera Plantarum Florae Germanicae, Bonn 1833–1838.
- Das System der Pilze, Bonn 1837 - System of fungi.
