= Frederick LeRoy Sargent =

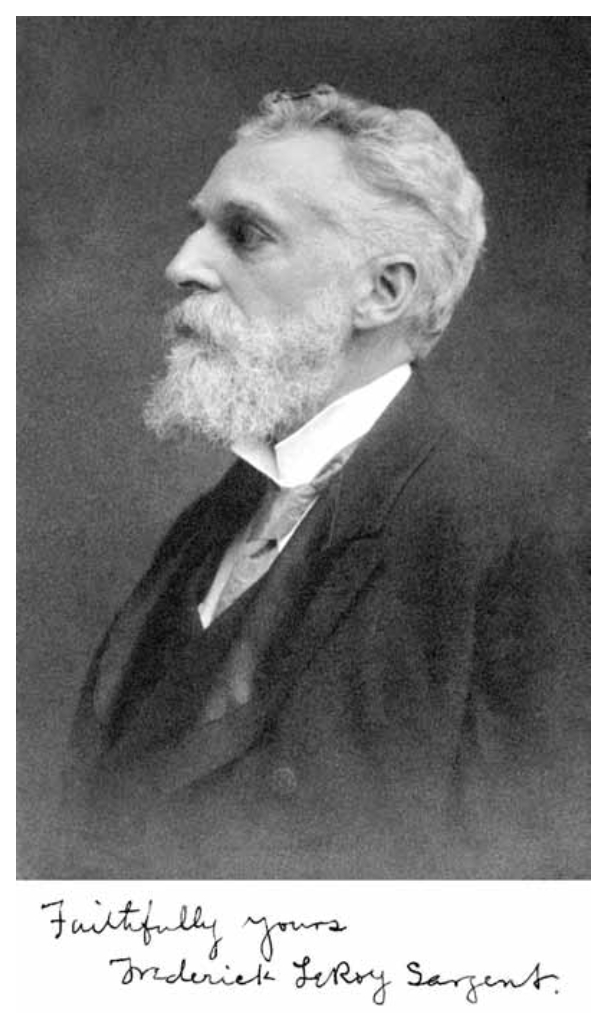
Carte-de-visite

Frederick LeRoy Sargent (25 December 1863 – 16 January 1928) was an American botanist and a professor at the University of Wisconsin. He wrote several popular books on botany.

== Life and work ==
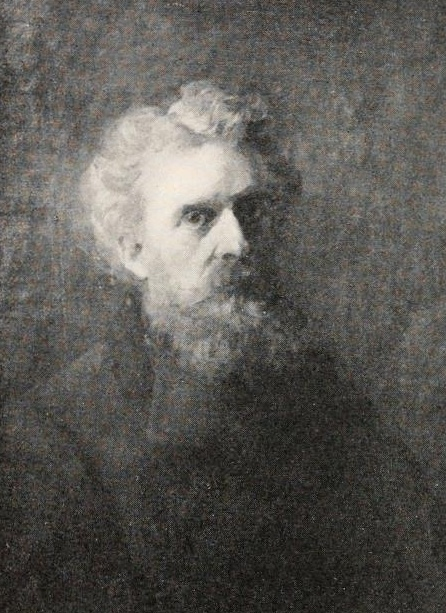

Sargent was born in Boston, Massachusetts, son of George Frederick and Mary Motley (Garett) Sargent. He was educated in New York city from 1866 and went to the College of the city of New York (1879-81) and then to Lawrence Scientific School, Harvard, where he studied botany (1883-86). He then became an instructor at Harvard. In 1886 he received a position at the University of Wisconsin to succeed professor A. B. Seymour. He married Helen Maria Castilia, daughter of Francis James and Elizabeth E. (Sedgwick) Child in 1903. He wrote several popular books including Guide to Cryptogams (1886), Through a microscope (1886) along with Mary Treat and Samuel Wells, How to describe a flowering plant (1894) and Corn plants: their uses and ways of life (1899). He later served as an instructor in botany at the medical school of Boston University (1894-95), presided over the Columbine association and the National Flower Convention, Asheville (1896). He used and promoted the microscopic examination of plants and wrote on cryptogams and was an early adopter of the idea that lichens were symbionts. He was involved in the establishment of a national flower for the United States of America and supported the selection of the columbine (Aquilegia coerulea). He noted that the thirteen leaflets of the plant could further signify the original states.
