= Francisco Fuentes Maturana =

Chilean botanist

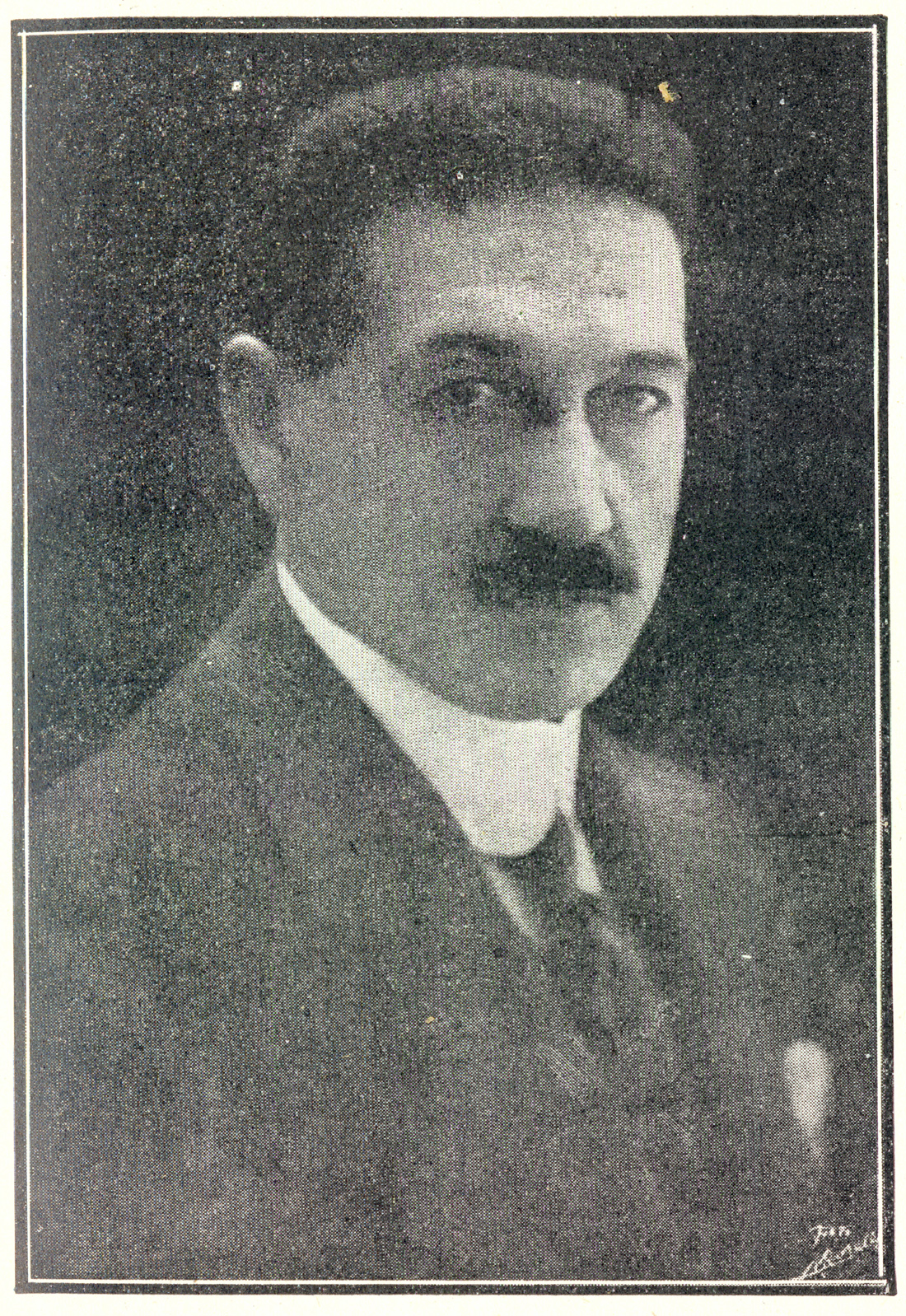
- Born: Francisco Fuentes Maturana; April 19, 1879; San Fernando, Chile
- Died: February 5, 1934; Aysén
- Education: University of Chile
- Years active: 1911–1934
- Spouse: Noemí Fuentes León
- Children: Hernán Fuentes Fuentes, Hugo Fuentes Fuentes
- Parent(s): Elías Fuentes and Francisca Maturana

Francisco Fuentes Maturana (April 19, 1879 – February 5, 1934) was a Chilean botanist and head of the Phanerogamic Botany Section at the National Museum of Natural History between 1912 and 1934. He was a specialist in applied botany and phanerogamic plants.

== Biography ==
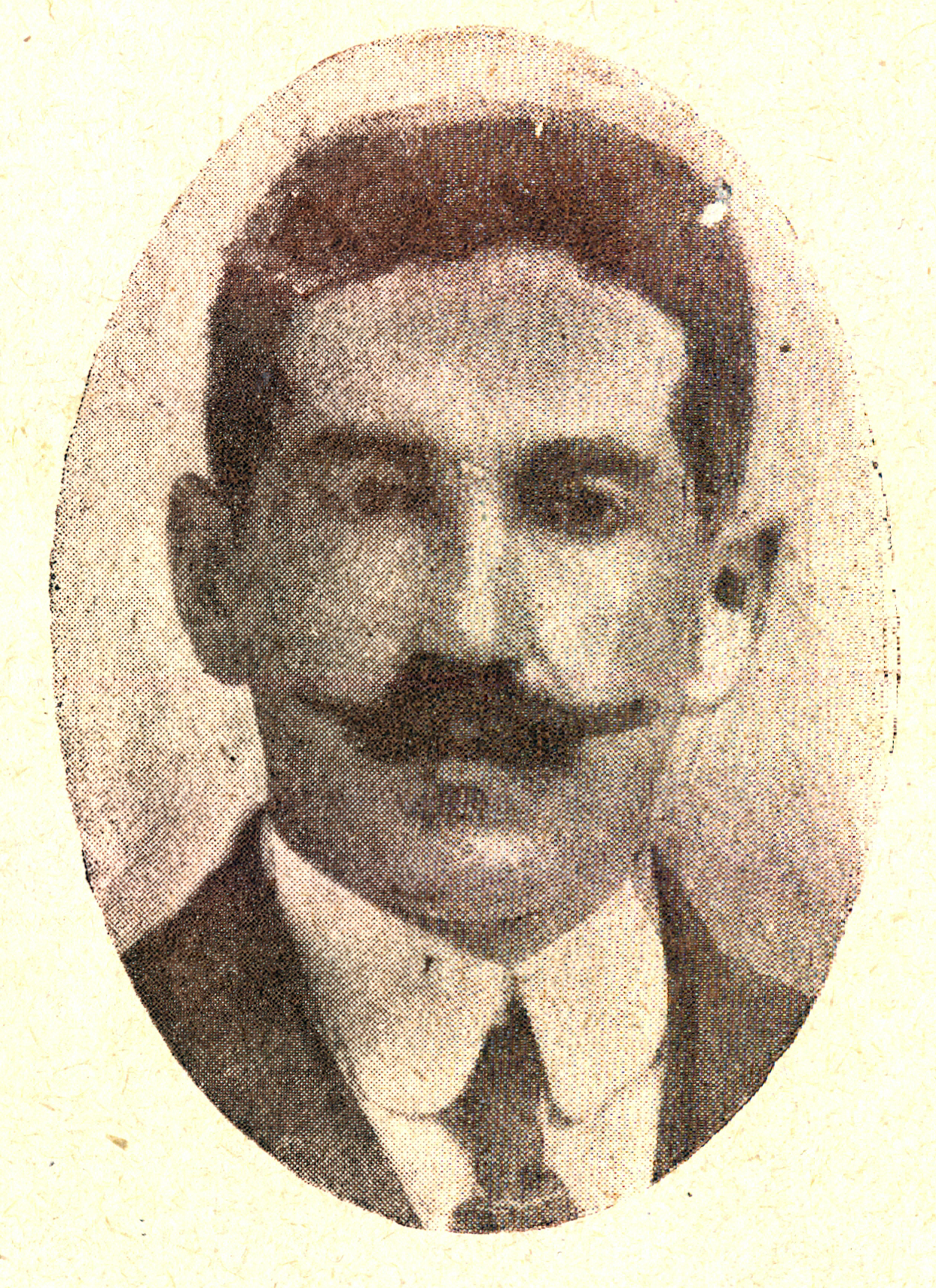
Francisco Fuentes, head of Phanerogamic Botany at MNHN

He was born in the city of San Fernando, the son of Elías Fuentes and Francisca Fuentes. He completed his early schooling in San Fernando. Later, he moved to Santiago, where he enrolled at the José Miguel Carrera National Institute to pursue his secondary education. After entering the Pedagogical Institute, he earned his degree as a State Teacher in Natural Sciences in 1897 and worked as a teacher in several high schools across the country, including the Angol High School (1899-1901), the San Fernando Men's High School (1901-1907), the La Serena High School (1907-1912), the Military School (1912-1916), the José Victorino Lastarria High School (1913-1925), and the Amunátegui High School (1918-1934). At the University of Chile's Agronomic Institute, he taught botany from 1914 to 1934. He published his first scientific papers in the La Opinión newspaper in San Fernando in 1914. He was a member of several scientific societies, including the Chilean Society of Natural History (of which he was president in 1928) and the Chilean Academy of Natural Sciences.

In 1915, he married Albina Noemí Fuentes León, with whom he had two children.

Upon earning his teaching degree, Fuentes quickly distinguished himself as a botanist. In 1911, he was commissioned by Chilean President Ramón Barros Luco to travel to Easter Island, accompanying the German meteorologist Walter Knoche, then director of the Central Meteorological Institute of Chile. On the island, Fuentes conducted fauna collections, meteorological and volcanic research, and discovered the only known specimen of toromiro. He reported this discovery to the Swedish botanist Carl Skottsberg, who later described the species. Fuentes documented his work in the book Flora and Fauna of Easter Island.

== Work at the NMNH ==
Fuentes began working at the National Museum of Natural History on March 1, 1912, taking charge of the Phanerogamic Botany Section, replacing Karl Reiche, who had emigrated to Mexico. He also worked at the museum's School of Advanced Studies, teaching the subject of Phanerogamy. Francisco Fuentes's main contribution as head of the section was its systematic organization, along with the study and maintenance of the National Herbarium. He also continued Reiche's work, especially in describing new plant species. For this purpose, Francisco Fuentes conducted a series of expeditions in Chilean territory, collecting samples of Chilean flora. Fuentes traveled to Rapa Nui, the Juan Fernández Archipelago, the Atacama Desert, and the forests of the southern part of the country. In 1912, he was appointed as Chile's representative to the International Botanical Congress, held in Cambridge, England. On that occasion, Fuentes visited the Kew Botanic Garden. In 1930, he was commissioned by Carlos Ibáñez del Campo to participate in the Fifth International Botanical Congress, where he was honored as a Member of the World Committee for Botanical Nomenclature.

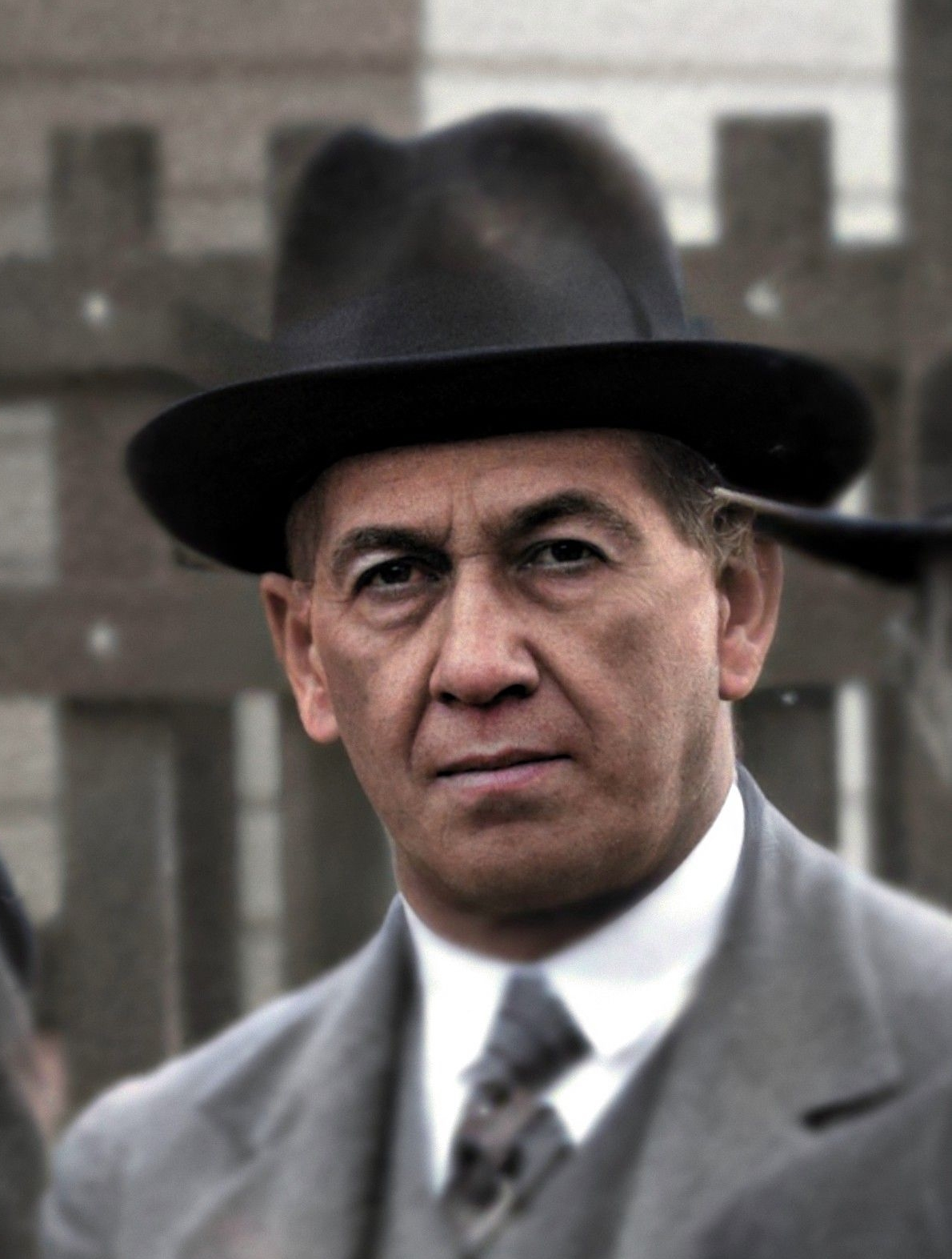
One of the last photographs of Francisco Fuentes, in 1934.

In 1934, he was part of the Macqueen expedition organized by Ricardo Latcham, director of the NMNH. During this expedition, Francisco Fuentes died after falling from his horse in the Río Blanco area. Carlos E. Porter remembered Francisco Fuentes: "All of us who had the opportunity to personally know Professor Fuentes remember his kind face, his frank and loyal friendship, and his unwavering work spirit. In the National Museum, in the Federico Johow Center, in the Chilean Academy of Natural Sciences, and above all in the Chilean Society of Natural History, of which he was one of its founders and most devoted attendees, the memory of this worthy colleague can never be extinguished."
