= Vidnava =

- Town
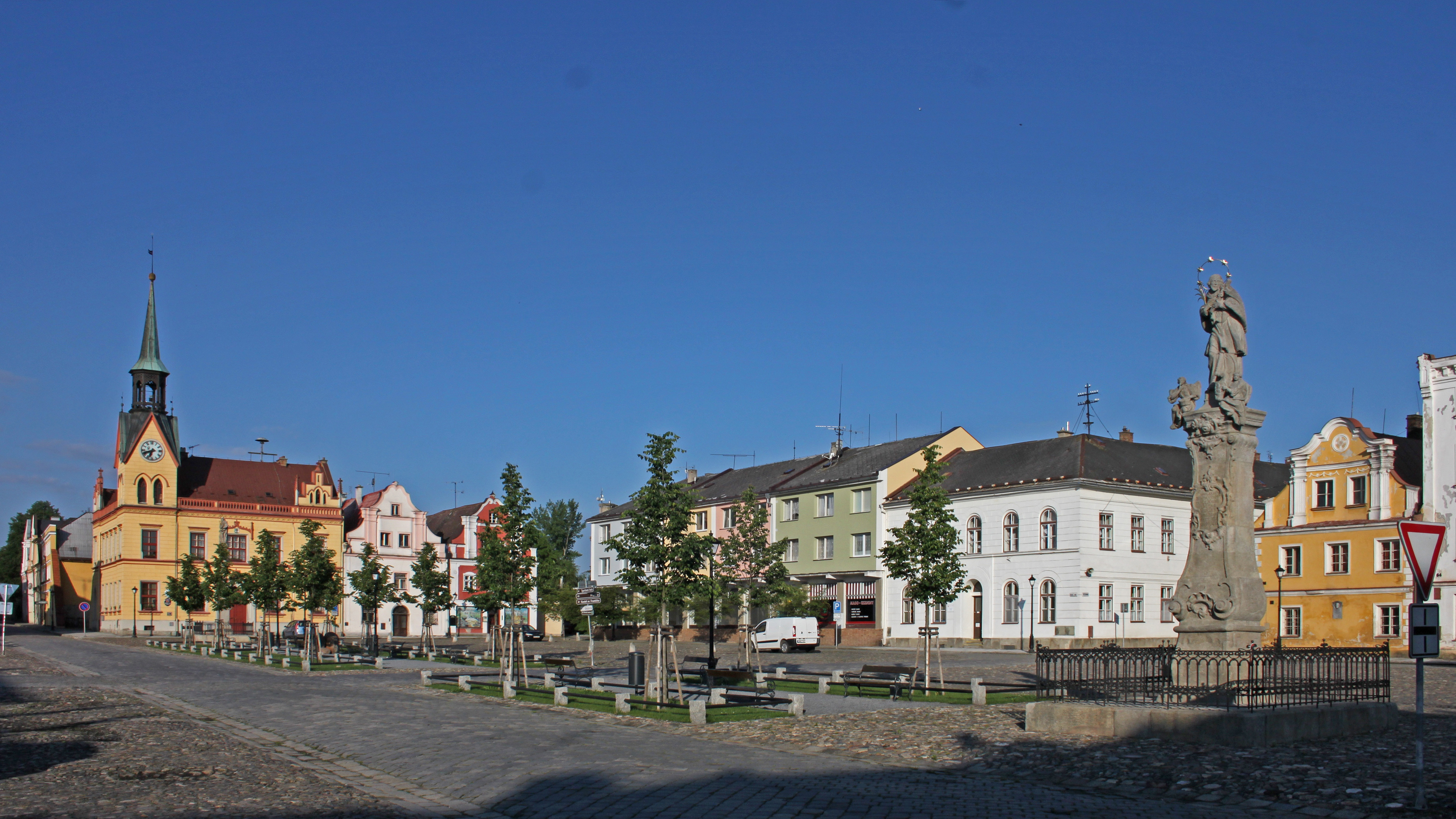
- Town square

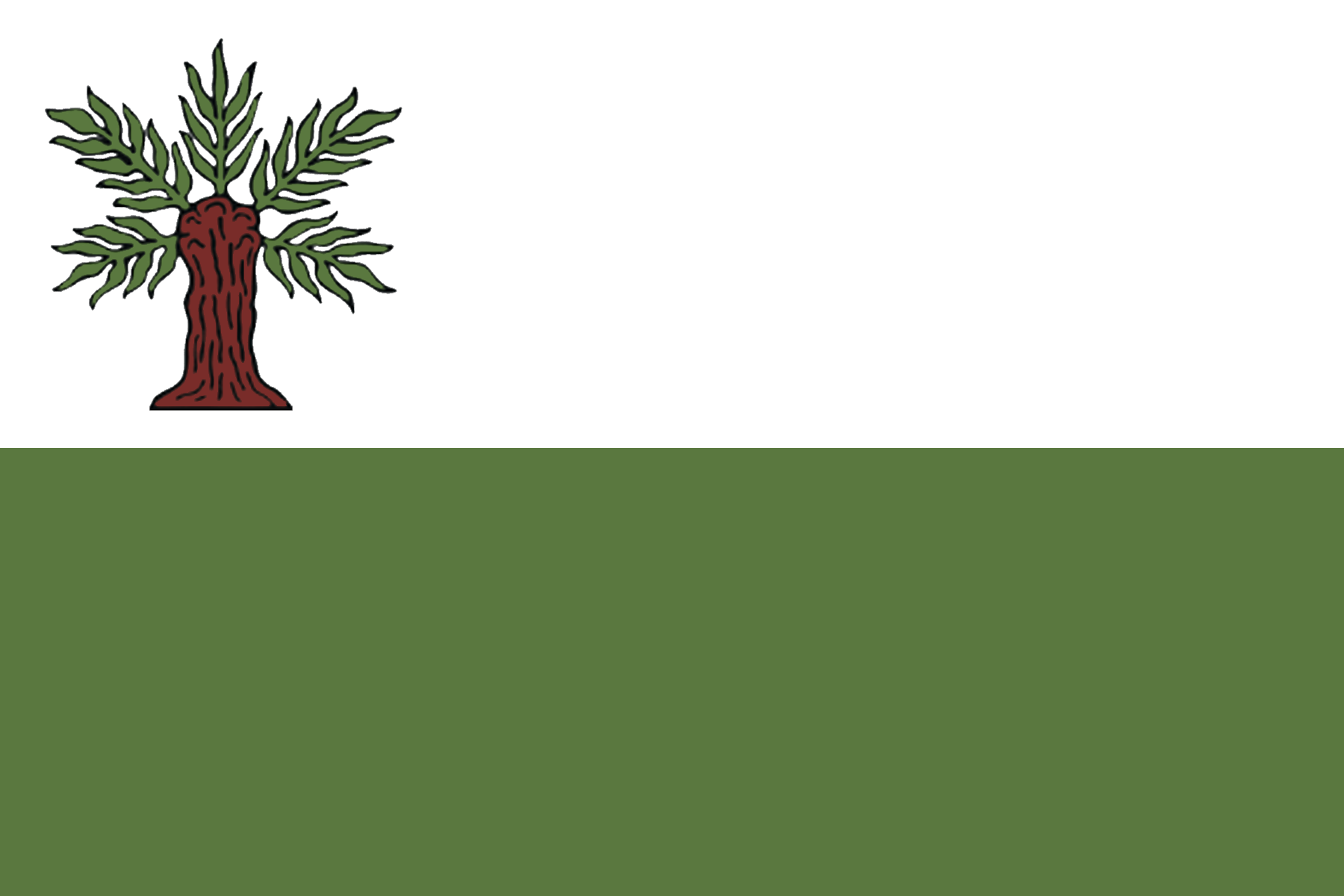
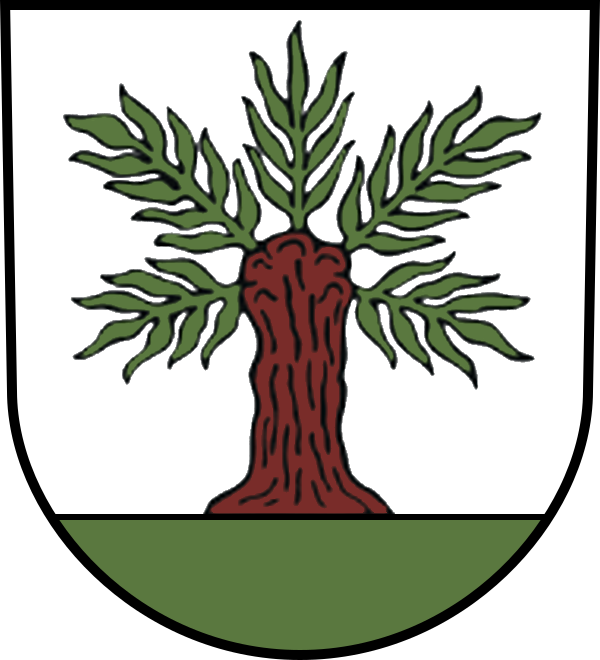
- Flag Coat of arms

- Location in the Czech Republic
- Coordinates: 50°22′20″N 17°11′11″E
- Country: Czech Republic
- Region: Olomouc
- District: Jeseník
- First mentioned: 1291

Government
  - Mayor: Rostislav Kačora

Area
  - Total: 4.27 km^{2} (1.65 sq mi)
- Elevation: 239 m (784 ft)

Population (2026-01-01)
  - Total: 1,192
  - Density: 279/km^{2} (723/sq mi)
- Time zone: UTC+1 (CET)
  - Summer (DST): UTC+2 (CEST)
- Postal code: 790 55
- Website: www.vidnava.cz

Vidnava (Czech pronunciation: [ˈvɪdnava]; German: Weidenau, Polish: Widnawa) is a town in Jeseník District in the Olomouc Region of the Czech Republic. It has about 1,200 inhabitants. The historic town centre is well preserved and is protected as an urban monument zone.

== Etymology ==
The town's name is derived from the name of the Vidnávka River. The name of the river has its origin in vidět (i.e. 'to see'), which was derived from the clear water through which it could be seen. The town's name first appeared written as Wydna and Widna. The German name arose from the Czech name and the similarity with the word weide (i.e. 'willow') is accidental. Nevertheless, the willow appeared on the coat of arms.

== Geography ==
Vidnava is located about 16 kilometres (10 mi) north of Jeseník and 86 km (53 mi) north of Olomouc, on the border with Poland. It lies in the Vidnava Lowland, on the right bank of the Vidnávka River. The highest point is at 309 m (1,014 ft) above sea level.

In the northern part of the municipal territory is the Vidnavské mokřiny Nature Reserve. It has an area of 32.0 ha (79 acres). The reason for the protection are peat and wetland meadows with endangered communities of Carex rostrata and Carex lasiocarpa, and other endangered plants and animals, especially the dusky large blue.

== History ==
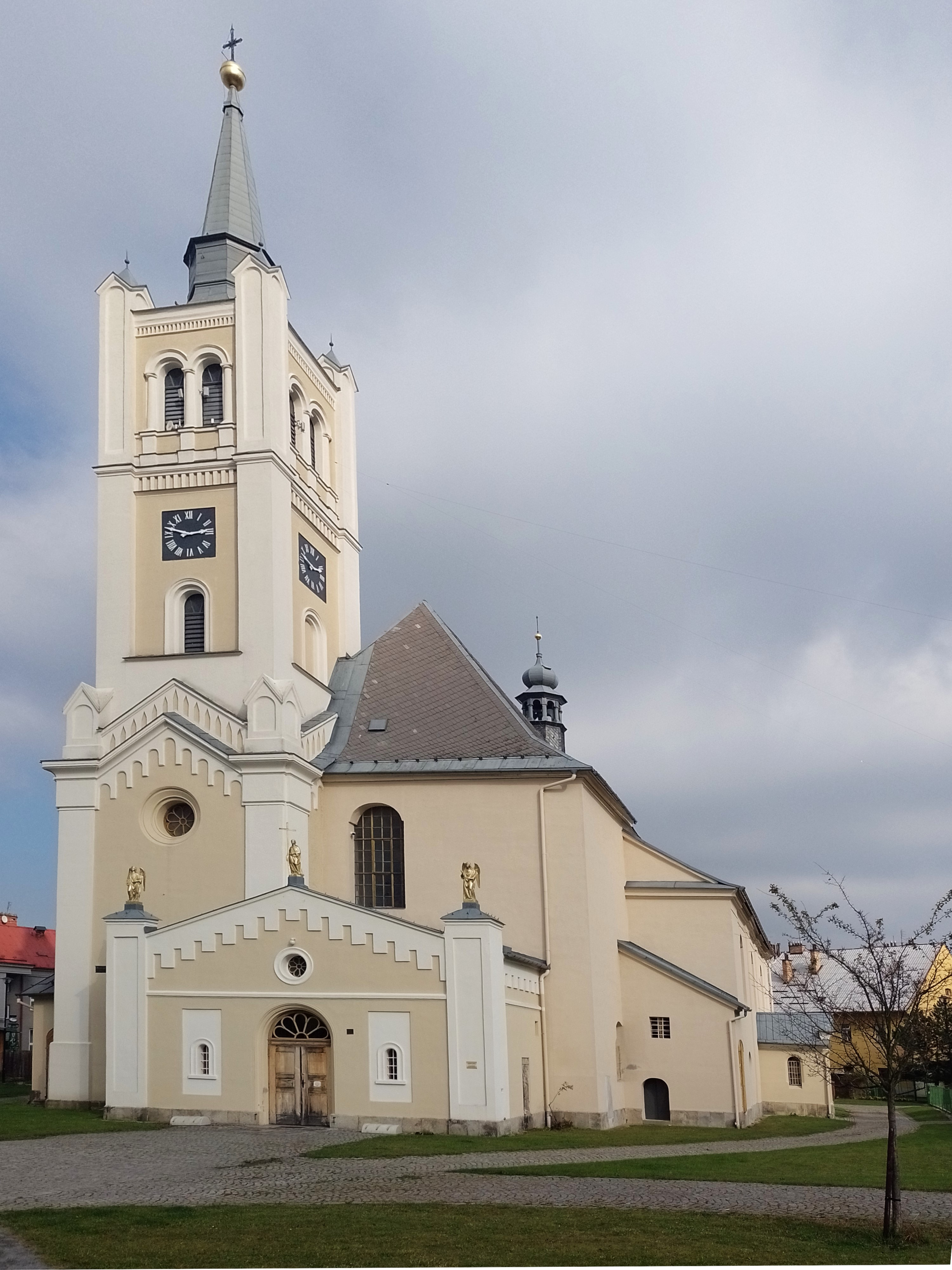
Church of Saint Catherine of Alexandria

The first written mention of Vidnava is from 1291. At the end of the 14th century, the area was colonised by Germans. The town prospered until the Hussite Wars, during which in 1428 it was conquered and burned. Vidnava did not recover until the early 16th century, when there was a boom in crafts. The town was again destroyed by a large fire in 1574, and then during the Thirty Years' War, when it was conquered by the Swedish army several times.

The history of the town was influenced by the War of the Austrian Succession in 1741–1745. The newly established borders of Silesia made Vidnava a border town, cut off from the rich villages to the east of it.

After the construction of the railway at the end of the 19th century, Vidnava became a railway junction for freight transport from Czechoslovakia to Poland, but this ended with World War II, when the railway bridge over the river Vidnávka was destroyed in 1945.

During World War II, the German occupiers operated the Oflag VIII-G and Heilag VIII-G prisoner-of-war camps for Allied POWs and the E214 and E780 forced labour subcamps of the Stalag VIII-B/344 POW camp in Vidnava. Four POWs who were killed by the Germans during escape attempts were buried at the Catholic cemetery in Vidnava. For many prisoners of war, Vidnava was a stopping place on The March during the final months of World War II in Europe. A memorial dedicated to 19 victims of The March is on the local cemetery.

In 1959, the borders between Czechoslovakia and Poland were adjusted and 80 ha (200 acres) of territory was added to Vidnava. From 1976 to 1990, Velká Kraš was a municipal part of Vidnava.

== Demographics ==
Historical population

| Year | Pop. | ±% |
|---|---|---|
| 1869 | 1,854 | — |
| 1880 | 2,106 | +13.6% |
| 1890 | 2,146 | +1.9% |
| 1900 | 2,096 | −2.3% |
| 1910 | 2,151 | +2.6% |

| Year | Pop. | ±% |
|---|---|---|
| 1921 | 2,286 | +6.3% |
| 1930 | 2,186 | −4.4% |
| 1950 | 1,301 | −40.5% |
| 1961 | 1,500 | +15.3% |
| 1970 | 1,481 | −1.3% |

| Year | Pop. | ±% |
|---|---|---|
| 1980 | 1,544 | +4.3% |
| 1991 | 1,525 | −1.2% |
| 2001 | 1,424 | −6.6% |
| 2011 | 1,306 | −8.3% |
| 2021 | 1,159 | −11.3% |

Source: Censuses

== Transport ==
There are no railways or major roads passing through the municipality.

== Sights ==
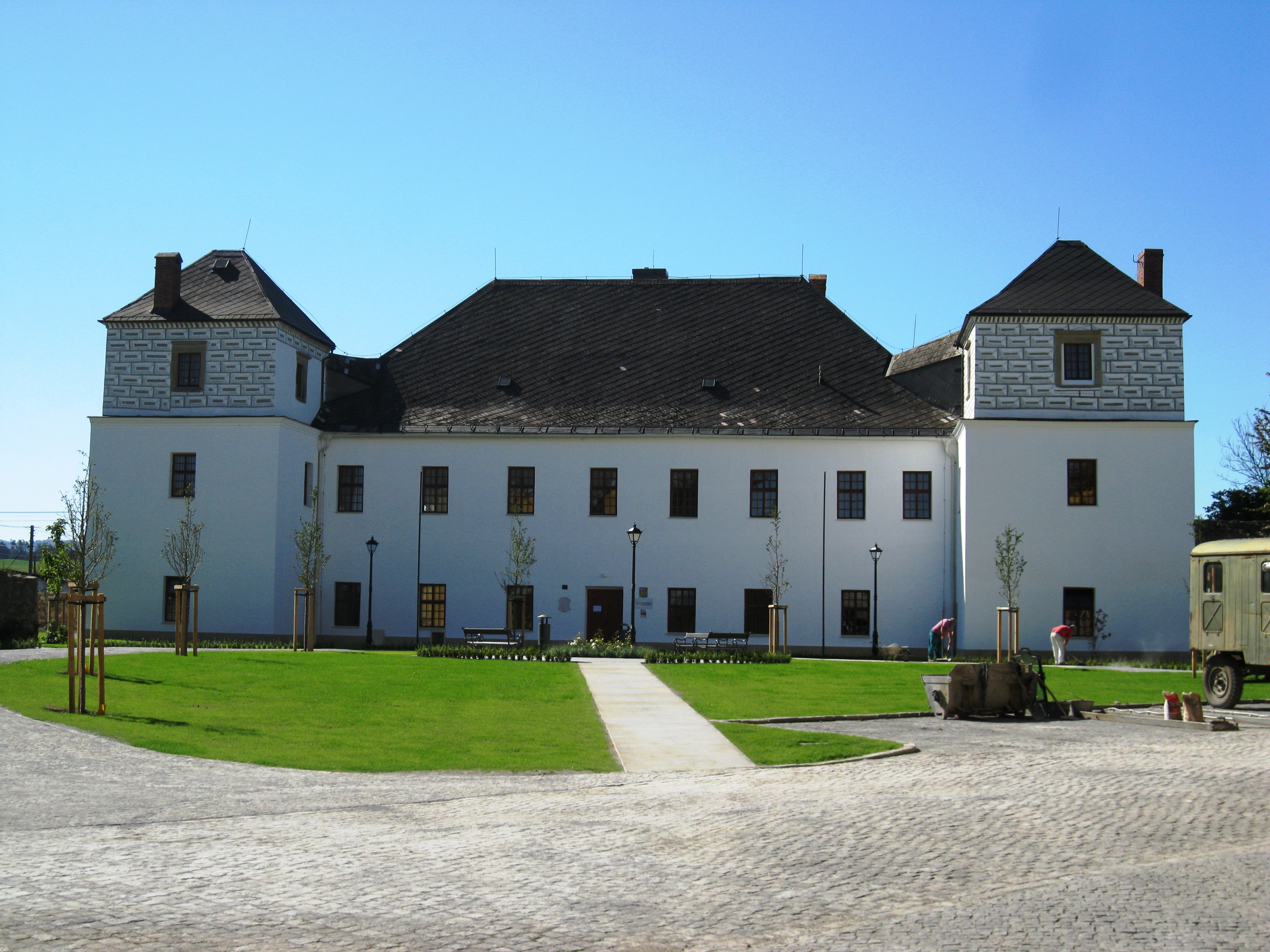
Vidnava Castle

The historic town centre is delimited by the preserved remains of the late medieval town fortifications from the 15th and the 16th centuries. The town square is lined by medieval houses with late Baroque and Empire gables.

The landmark is the Church of Saint Catherine of Alexandria. It was originally a Gothic church, founded together with the town in the 13th century. Today's appearance is the result of Baroque and Neoclassical reconstructions. The last major reconstruction took place in 1883, when a neo-Gothic tower was added.

The Renaissance one-storey Vidnava Castle comes from the second half of the 16th century. It has two towers decorated with sgraffito. Today it houses a primary art school.

== Notable people ==
- Adolf Lorenz (1854–1946), Austrian orthopedic surgeon
- Friedrich Karl Max Vierhapper (1876–1932), Austrian botanist

== Twin towns – sister cities ==
Vidnava is twinned with:

- Neuburg an der Donau, Germany
