= Friedrich Vierhapper =

Austrian botanist (1844–1903)

Friedrich Vierhapper (1844–1903) was an Austrian amateur botanist. He was the father of botanist Friedrich Karl Max Vierhapper (1876–1932), botanical abbreviation- "Vierh.".

He obtained his education in Salzburg and Vienna, later working as an instructor at a high school in Weidenau (1875–1881) and at the gymnasium in Ried im Innkreis (1881–1895).

== Bibliography ==
- Prodromus einer Flora des Innkreises in Oberösterreich Ried : Druck von Josef Fridrich & Comp., 1885–1889.
