= Frederick John Pritchard =

American plant scientist

Frederick John Pritchard (died January 13, 1931) was an American plant scientist. He was a senior plant physiologist at the United States Department of Agriculture. He developed many disease resistant varieties of tomato.

The standard author abbreviation F.J.Pritch. is used to indicate this person as the author when citing a botanical name.
