= Étienne Edmond Foëx =

Étienne Edmond Foëx (8 June 1876, Montpellier – 29 October 1944 Paris) was a French botanist and phytopathologist. The standard author abbreviation É.E.Foëx is used to indicate this person as the author when citing a botanical name.

== Works ==
- Ducomet, Vital; Foex, Etienne Edmond (1926). La maladie verruqueuse de la pomme de terre (in French). Imprimerie nationale.
- Capus, Guillaume; Foëx, Etienne Edmond; Leulliot, Fernand (1930). Le tabac (in French). Société d'éditions géographiques, maritimes et coloniales.
