= Olga Fassatiová =

Czech mycologist

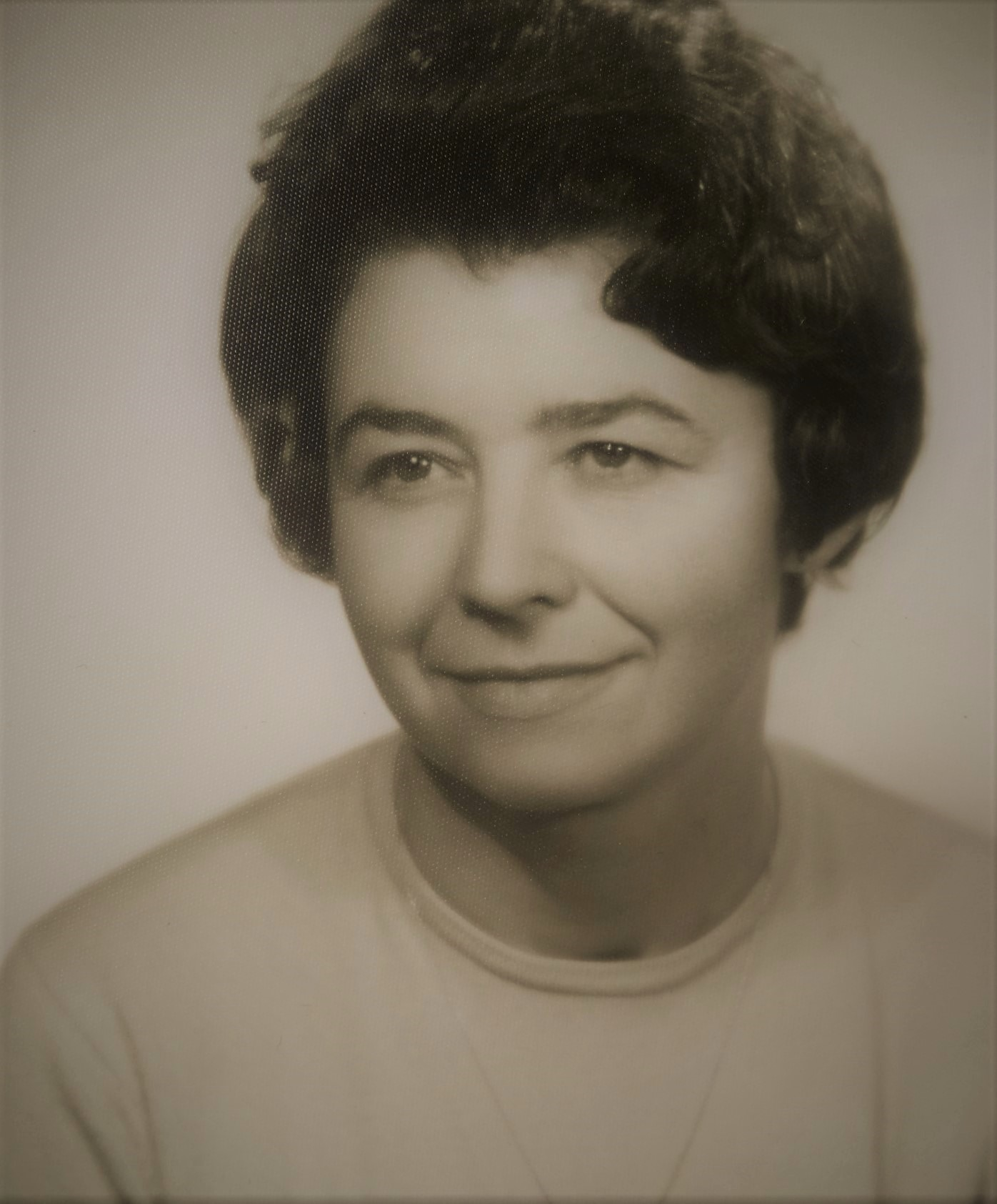
- Born: October 17, 1924; Prague, Czech Republic
- Died: December 15, 2011 (aged 87)
- Scientific career
- Fields: Mycology; botany
- Author abbrev. (botany): Fassat.

Olga Fassatiová (1924–2011) was a Czech mycologist known for her work in the biology and ecology of saprophytic fungi, including fungi on food, feed, and soils.

== Education and career ==
From 1951 to 1991, she worked as a teacher and scientist in the Department of Botany at Charles University in Prague. There, she began the fungal culture collection at the university in 1964 and helped establish the Federation of Czechoslovak Collections of Microorganisms. She also described several fungi, including Acrodontium griseum, and authored over 60 journal articles and textbook chapters.

== Awards and honors ==
The fungus Trichoderma fassatiovae was named in her honor.
