= Frederick Janson Hanbury =

Frederick Janson Hanbury (27 May 1851 – 1 March 1938) was an English businessman, naturalist and meteorologist. He established a private observatory in Brockhurst where he made meteorological and astronomical observations. He also wrote a monograph on the genus Hieracium in collaboration with E. S. Marshall.

== Biography ==
Hanbury was born in Stoke Newington, the son of Cornelius Hanbury who was a partner of Allen & Hanburys drug company. He was a cousin of Sir Thomas Hanbury and Daniel Hanbury. He studied at Friends' School, Tottenham and studied pharmacy and joined his father's business in 1872 becoming the chairman of the firm in 1916. He was keenly interested in natural history, particularly botany and collaborated with Reverend E. S. Marshall on the flowering plants of Britain. He studied the genus Hieracium and published a monograph on it in 1889. He late edited the "London Catalogue of British Plants". He bought an estate Brockhurst in East Grinstead where he established a private observatory and set up a rock garden. He hired William Sadler Franks in 1910. After Franks' death it was managed by Patrick Moore. Hanbury also grew tropical orchids and took an interest in entomology. He received the Victoria Medal of Honour of the Royal Horticultural Society. He joined the Linnean Society in 1873. He donated the herbarium of Boswell Syme that he owned to the Natural History Museum.
