= Rudolf von Fischer-Benzon =

German librarian and botanist (1839–1911)

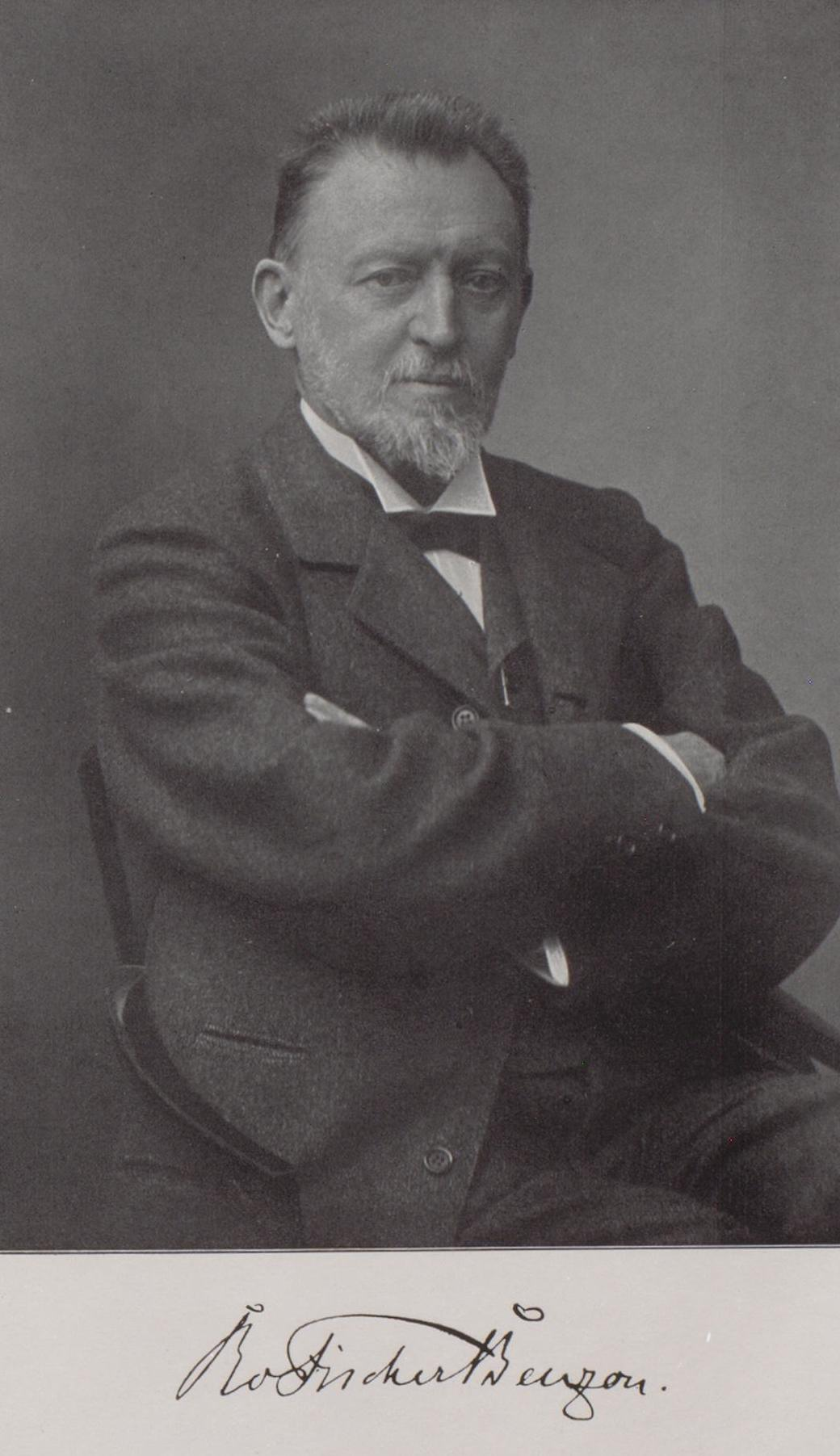
Rudolf von Fischer-Benzon

Rudolf von Fischer-Benzon (2 February 1839 in Westermühlen – 17 July 1911 in Wyk auf Föhr) was a German schoolteacher and botanist.

He studied natural sciences and mathematics at the University of Kiel, where in 1866 he obtained his habilitation for mineralogy. In 1866 he embarked on a scientific journey to Norway and Sweden. Afterwards, he successively he worked as gymnasium teacher in Meldorf (from 1869), Hadersleben (from 1871), Husum (from 1874) and Kiel (from 1878). In 1889 he received the title of professor. In 1895 he was named librarian at the Schleswig-Holsteinische Landesbibliothek (Schleswig-Holstein state library) in Kiel.

== Selected works ==
- Mikroskopische Untersuchungen über die Structur des Halysites-Arten und einiger silurischer Gesteine aus den russischen Ostsse-Provinzen, 1871 – Microscopic studies on the structure of Halysites species and some Silurian rocks from the Russian Baltic governorates.
- Die Moore der Provinz Schleswig-Holstein : eine vergleichende Untersuchung, 1891 – The moors in the Province of Schleswig-Holstein; a comparative study.
- Altdeutsche Gartenflora, 1894 – Old German garden flora.
- Katalog der Schleswig-Holsteinischen Landsbibliothek (1898–1907) – Catalog of the Schleswig-Holstein state library.
- Die Flechten Schleswig-Holsteins, 1901 – Lichens of Schleswig-Holstein.
