= Johann Erdwin Christoph Ebermaier =

German physician and pharmacist

Johann Erdwin Christoph Ebermaier (19 April 1768, Melle near Osnabrück – 21 February 1825) was a German physician and pharmacist. He was the father of Carl Heinrich Ebermaier, a writer on medicinal botany.

He trained at the surgical academy in Braunschweig, then studied medicine in Göttingen. In 1797 he obtained his medical doctorate, then practiced medicine in Rheda and later in Dortmund. Afterwards, he moved to Kleve, where he was appointed to the Prussian medicinal council. He later worked in the same capacity in Düsseldorf.

Throughout his lifetime, he maintained an interest in the field of pharmacy, and was the author of Pharmaceutische Receptirkunst oder Anleitung für Apotheker (Pharmaceutical formulary or instructions for apothecaries; 1804). He was also the author of textbooks and manuals on obstetrics and surgery that were popular in their time. With Georg Wilhelm Christoph Consbruch (1764-1837), he published Allgemeine Encyclopädie für practische Ärzte und Wundärzte (General encyclopedia for physicians and surgeons; 1803).

== Works ==
- Vergleichende Beschreibung derjenigen Pflanzen, welche in den Apotheken leicht miteinander verwechselt werden, nebst ihren unterscheidenden Kennzeichen und einer Einl. ü. diesen Gegenstand . Schulbuchhdl., Braunschweig 1794 Digital edition by the University and State Library Düsseldorf
- [Standorten] : von den Standörtern der Pflanzen, im allgemeinen und denen der Arzne gewächse insbesonderes; vorzüglich in Hinsicht der Verschiedenheit in den Kräften und Wirkungen arzneylicher Pflanzen von einer und derselben Art, nach ihren verschiedenen Standörtern; für Aerzte und Apotheker . Waldeck, Münster 1802 Digital edition by the University and State Library Düsseldorf
