= Edward Shearburn Marshall =

British clergyman and naturalist (1858–1919)

In 1919

Edward Shearburn Marshall (7 March 1858 – 25 November 1919) was an English clergyman and naturalist who worked extensively on the study of the English plants.

Marshall was born in London and was initially tutored at home and in Germany. He was also educated at Marlborough College and graduated in 1881 from Brasenose College, Oxford. He visited the United States and joined Wells Theological College in 1882 and was ordained deacon in 1883. He worked in various parishes in the south and southeast of England. He married Fanny Isabel Foster, niece of Birket Foster in 1887. They lived at Offa's Dyke near Chepstow. He was initially interested in the birds but after meeting R. P. Murray, F. J. Hanbury and others, he moved to concentrate on the plants. He was elected Fellow of the Linnean Society in 1887 and Fellow of the Botanical Society of Edinburgh in 1911. He collaborated with Hanbury on the Flora of Kent from 1899. He bequeathed his herbarium to Cambridge University.
