= Fredrik Nylander =

Fredrik Nylander (9 September 1820 – 29 September 1880) was a Finnish medical doctor and botanist who was among the first to study the plants of Finland, describing about eleven new species.

The standard author abbreviation F.Nyl. is used to indicate this person as the author when citing a botanical name.

Nylander was born in Oulu to magistrate Anders and his wife Margareta Magdalena Fahlander. He was educated at Oulu Grammar School and later in Turku and Helsinki. He studied natural sciences at the Imperial Alexander University majoring in botany and zoology and graduated in 1840 after some travels around Europe in 1839. He received an MS in the same year and then studied botany under Elias Fries and from 1843 to 1846 he studied Botany in St Petersburg under F. E. L. Fischer. In 1842 he travelled around Fennoscandia collecting plants and published part of the Spicilegium Plantarum Fennicarum (1843) and received a Phil. Lic. degree in 1844 and a Ph.D. in 1844. He then explored the Kola peninsula. He applied for a position in the Imperial Alexander University in 1844 but this was taken up by Reinhold Ferdinand Sahlberg. He applied again in 1847 but failed again. In 1849 he quit botany and began studies in medicine, receiving a license in 1853. He practiced in Oulu and also became a parliament member in 1872.

Nylander was a member of the Societas pro Fauna et Flora Fennica from 1836 and was in charge of its collections which were destroyed in 1827 in the great fire of Turku. The collections were rebuilt and Nylander donated most of his collections to it.

Nylander married Ida Babette Hummel and they had three children. His brother William Nylander (1822–1899) was a famous lichenologist and served as the first professor of botany at the University of Helsinki. His brothers Abraham Adolf Nylander (1823–1856) and Anders Edwin Nylander (1831–1890) also contributed to biology.
