= Friedrich Wilhelm Ludwig Suckow =

German physician and naturalist (1770–1838)

Friedrich Wilhelm Ludwig Suckow (1770, Heidelberg – 21 June 1838, Mannheim) was a German medical doctor and naturalist.

Friedrich Wilhelm Ludwig Suckow studied at the University of Heidelberg graduating in 1813 with a thesis entitled "Myologia insectorum …". His father was Georg Adolf Suckow.

Suckow was Professor of Nature research (Naturwissenschaften) and curator of the Natural History Museum in Mannheim. He wrote

- (1813): Myologiae Insectorum specimen de Astaco fluviatili cum aliis anatomicis disquisitionibus. Inauguraldissertation.
- (1818): Anatomisch-physiologische Untersuchungen der Insecten und Krustenthiere. 70 S. mit 11 Kupfern. Engelmann, Heidelberg.
- (1819): Naturgeschichte der Insekten. 262 S. mit drei Kupfern. Engelmann, Heidelberg.
- (1822): Flora Mannhemiensis et vicinarum regionum cis- et transrhenanarum. Manhemium
- (1824): Concrementa calculosa im Darmcanale der Wirbelthiere. Bad. Annalen der Heilk. II.
- (1824): Naturgeschichte des Maykäfers (Melolontha vulgaris Fabr.). 36 S. mit 3 lithograph. Tafeln. Verhandlungen des Grossherzoglich Badischen Landwirthschaftlichen Vereins Carlsruhe.
- (1827): Ueber den Winterschlaf der Insecten. Heusinger’s Zeitschrift f. organ. Physik I.
- (1828): Ueber die Respiration der Insecten, insbesondere über die Darmrespiration der Aeschna grandis. Heusinger’s Zeitschrift f. organ. Physik II
- Ueber die Verdauungsorgane der Insecten. Heusinger’s Zeitschrift f. organ. Physik III
- (1837): Osteologische Beschreibung des Wals; Mit fünf lithograph. Tafeln in Querfolio. Mannheim
- (1830): Vademecum für Naturaliensammler oder vollständiger Unterricht Säugethiere, Vögel, Amphibien, Fische, Käfer, Schmetterlinge, Würmer, Pflanzen, Mineralien, Petrefacte etc. zu sammeln, zu conserviren und zu versenden. 189 S. Neff, Stuttgart.
- (ca. 1830): Osteologische Beschreibung des Delphin-Schädels, verglichen mit dem Schädel des Walls. 12 S. Löffler, Mannheim
- (1832): Das Naturalien-Cabinet : oder gründliche Anweisung, wie der Naturfreund bei naturhistorischen Excursionen und bei dem Sammeln, Ausstopfen, Skeletiren ... der Naturkörper jeder Art, namentlich der Säugethiere, Vögel, Fische, Reptilien, Käfer, Schmetterlinge, Pflanzen, Mineralien, Petrefacte u.s.w. verfährt, wie er sie versenden und in Sammlungen dauernd schön conserviren kann; Nebst lithogr. Abb. der, beim Naturaliensammeln erforderlichen Werkzeuge 189 S. Neff, Stuttgart.
