= Georg Adolf Suckow =

German physicist, chemist, mineralogist, mining engineer and naturalist

Georg Adolf Suckow sometimes Adolph (28 January 1751, Jena – 13 March 1813, Heidelberg) was a German physicist, chemist, mineralogist, mining engineer and naturalist. Suckow was a professor of physics, chemistry, and natural history at the University of Heidelberg. He wrote many books and articles on chemistry, botany, zoology and mineralogy. From 1808 he was a Member of the Bavarian Academy of Sciences and Humanities. His son Friedrich Wilhelm Ludwig Suckow (1770–1838) was also a naturalist.

== Works ==
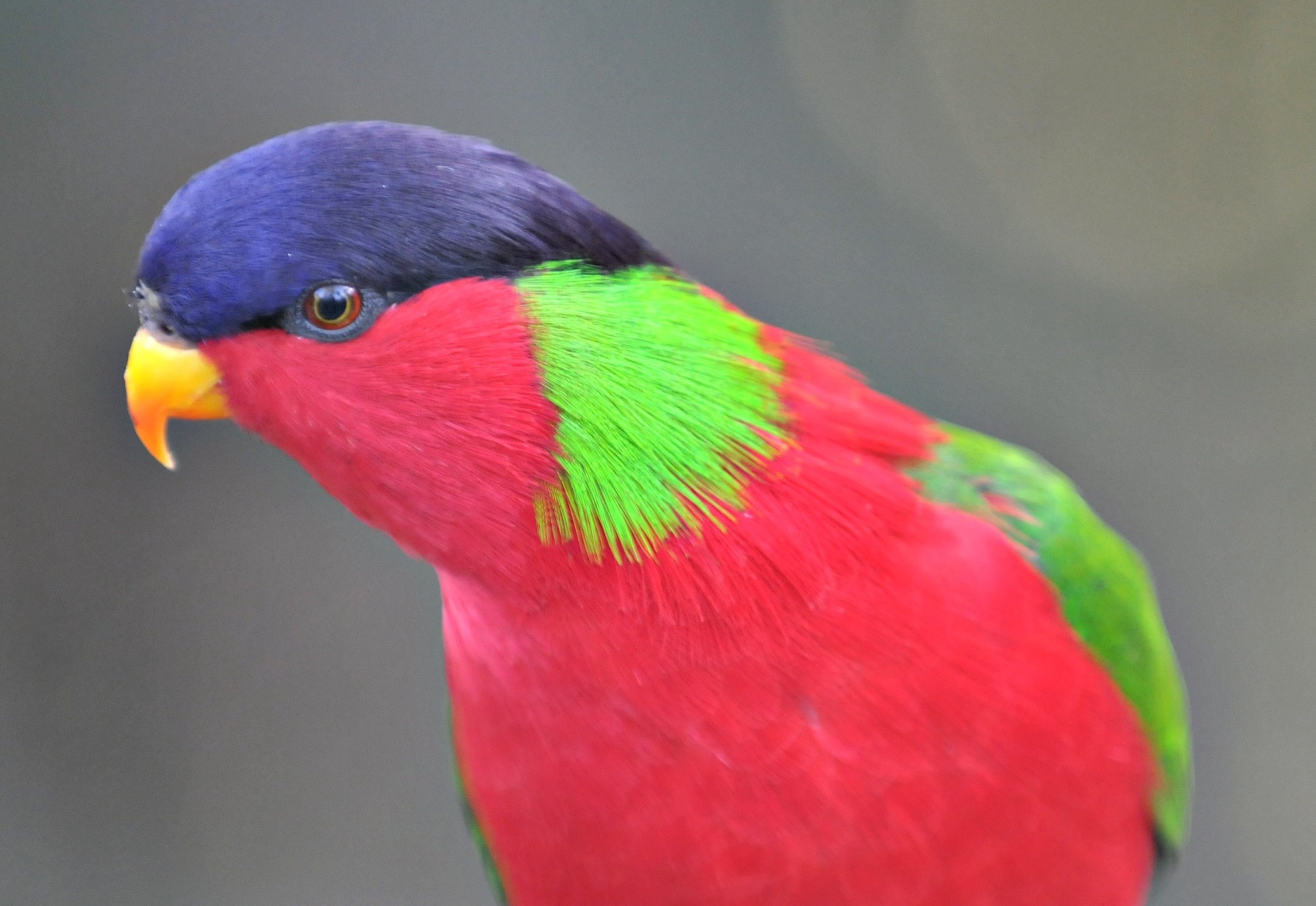
Phigys solitarius

- Von dem Nutzen der Chymie zum Behuf des bürgerlichen Lebens, und der Oekonomie. Nebst Ankündigung der Lesestunden des Sommers halben Jahres 1775 bei der kurfürstlichen oekonomischen Schule zu Lautern, von G.A. Suckow, der A.D. Professor der theoretischen Wissenschaften, und beständigen Sekretair der Kurfürstlichen oekonomischen Gesellschaft. Mannheim/Lautern (1775)
- Oekonomische Botanik. (1777)
- Versuche über die Wirkungen verschiedener Luftarten auf die Vegetation. (1782)
- Diagnose der Pflanzengattungen. (1792)
- Anfangsgrunde der theoretischen und angewandten Naturgeschichte der Thiere Leipzig: Weissmann.

A six volume work. part I. Mammals. 1797. II. Birds 1800 & 1801. III. Amphibia. 1798. IV. Fish 1799 V Reptiles 1798?, VI Invertebrates. Variously bound, variously dated. The volumes appear to be out of date order.
