= Friedrich Karl Max Vierhapper =

Austrian botanist (1876–1932)

Friedrich Karl Max Vierhapper (7 March 1876 in Weidenau – 11 July 1932) was an Austrian plant collector, botanist and professor of botany at the University of Vienna. He was the son of amateur botanist Friedrich Vierhapper (1844–1903), botanical abbreviation- "F.Vierh.".

== Background ==
From 1894 to 1899, he studied natural sciences at the University of Vienna, where he later worked as an assistant to Richard Wettstein at the botanical institute. From 1911 to 1932 he was an honorary professor at the school of veterinary medicine in Vienna. In the meantime, from 1918 he was employed as an associate professor of systematic botany at the University of Vienna.

He specialized in research of botanical species native to Austria, Switzerland and Greece. During his career, he collaborated with botanist August von Hayek (1871-1928) on plant-collecting excursions. He processed and described flora collected from an expedition by the Vienna Academy of Sciences to southern Arabia and Socotra (1898–99).

He was the binomial author of numerous species from the genus Erigeron. The plant genus Vierhapperia was named after him by botanist Heinrich von Handel-Mazzetti (1882-1940).

== Published works ==
In 1929 he published the second edition of Anton Kerner von Marilaun's Das Pflanzenleben der Donauländer (The plant life of Danube countries).

- Bau und Leben der Pflanzen : in zwölf gemeinverständliche Vorträge. Wien : C. Konegen, 1905. (with Karl Linsbauer) - Construction and biology of plants; in twelve easy-to-understand presentations.
- Beiträge zur Kenntnis der Flora Südarabiens und der Inseln Socotra, Semha und Abd al Kuri, 1907 - Contributions to the knowledge of south Arabian flora as well as the Islands of Socotra, Semha and Abd al Kuri
- Entwurf eines neuen Systemes der Coniferen, 1910 - Outline of a new system for conifers.
- Beiträge zur Kenntnis der Flora Kretas, 1917 - Contributions to the knowledge of Cretan flora.
- Beiträge zur Kenntnis der Flora Griechenlands, 1918 - Contributions to the knowledge of Greek flora.
- Vegetation und Flora des Lungau (Salzburg), 1935 - Vegetation and flora of Lungau (Salzburg).
