= List of botanists by author abbreviation (K–L) =

This is an incomplete list of botanists by their author abbreviation, which is designed for citation with the botanical names or works that they have published. This list follows that established by Brummitt & Powell (1992). Use of that list is recommended by Rec. 46A Note 1 of the International Code of Nomenclature for algae, fungi, and plants. The list is kept up to date online at The International Plant Names Index and Index Fungorum.

In some cases an "author abbreviation" consists of a full surname, while in other cases the surname is abbreviated and/or accompanied by one or more initials. There is no space between the initials and the surname (or its abbreviation).

==== Order of entries ====
The list here is maintained strictly in order of the alphabetic characters in the abbreviation; thus "A.B.Jacks." appears under "A" not "J", and is located as if the characters were "ABJACKS". Capitalization is ignored as are all non-alphabetic characters such as "." and space. Diacritical marks are also ignored, so that, e.g., "ü" is treated as if it were "u".

==== Navigation ====
Because of its length, the list is split across separate pages. All alphabetic sections can be accessed from the short table of contents; the vertical bars show the page divisions. Searching will only find an entry within a page.

== A–J ==
Contents:	A	B	C	D	E F	G	H	I J	K L	M	N O	P	Q R	S	T U V	W X Y Z

To find entries for A–J, use the table of contents above.

== K ==
Contents: Top	A	B	C	D	E F	G	H	I J	K L	M	N O	P	Q R	S	T U V	W X Y Z

- Kablík. – Josephine Ettel Kablick (also as Josefina Kablíková) (1787–1863)
- Kabuye – Christine H. Sophie Kabuye (born 1938)
- Kache – Paul Kache (1882–1945)
- Kadereit – Joachim Walter Kadereit (born 1956)
- Kaempf. – Engelbert Kaempfer (1651–1716)
- K.A.Ford – Kerry Alison Ford (born 1964)
- Kai Müll. – Kai Müller (born 1975)
- Kalchbr. – Károly Kalchbrenner (1807–1886)
- Kalkman – Cornelis Kalkman (1928–1998)
- Kallenb. – Franz Joseph Kallenbach (1893–1944)
- Källersjö – Mari Källersjö (born 1954)
- Kalm – Pehr Kalm (1716–1779)
- Kaltenb. – Johann Heinrich Kaltenbach (1807–1876)
- Kamel – Georg Joseph Kamel (1661–1706)
- Kamelin – Rudolf Vladimirovich Kamelin (1938–2016)
- Kameyama – Cíntia Kameyama (born 1965)
- Kamieński – Franciszek Michailow von Kamieński (1851–1912)
- Kanai – Hiroo Kanai (1930–2022)
- Kanda – Hiroshi Kanda (born 1946)
- Kandwal – Manish K. Kandwal (fl. 1977)
- Kane – Katharine Sophia Bailey Kane (1811–1886)
- Kaneh. – Ryōzō Kanehira (1882–1948)
- Kanér – Oskar Richard Kanér (1878–1956)
- Kanes – William H. Kanes (born 1934)
- Kanis – Andrias Kanis (1934–1986)
- Kanitz – August Kanitz (1843–1896)
- Kanjilal – Upendranath Kanjilal (1859–1928)
- Kann – Edith Kann (1907–1987)
- Kanouse – Bessie Bernice Kanouse (1889–1969)
- Kantsch. – Zaiharias A. Kantschaweli (1894–1932)
- Kantvilas – Gintaras Kantvilas (born 1956)
- Kapadia – Zarir Jamasji Kapadia (born 1935)
- Kappl. – August Kappler (1815–1887)
- Kar. – Grigorij Silych Karelin (1801–1872)
- Karakulov – Anatoliy Vladimirovich Karakulov (born 1952)
- Kar.-Castro – Vesna Karaman-Castro (fl. 2006)
- Karl – János Karl (1842–1882)
- Karremans – Adam Philip Karremans (born 1986)
- Karsch – Anton Karsch (1822–1892)
- Karst. – Gustav Karl Wilhelm Hermann Karsten (1817–1908)
- Kartesz – John T. Kartesz (fl. 1990)
- Karw. – Wilhelm Friedrich Karwinsky von Karwin (1780–1855)
- K.A.Sheph. – Kelly Anne Shepherd (born 1970)
- Kashyap – Shiv Ram Kashyap (1882–1934)
- Kasper – Andrew Edward Kasper (born 1942)
- Katinas – Liliana Katinas (born 1961)
- Kattari – Stefan Kattari (fl. 2016)
- Kaul – Kailash Nath Kaul (1905–1983)
- Kaulf. – Georg Friedrich Kaulfuss (1786–1830)
- Kausel – Eberhard Max Leopold Kausel (1910–1972)
- Kautman – Václav Kautman (fl. 2017)
- Kautman. – Ivona Kautmanová (fl. 2015)
- Kavina – Karel Kavina (1890–1948)
- Kawah. – Takayuki Kawahara (fl. 1995)
- Kaz.Osaloo – Shahrokh Kazempour Osaloo (born 1966)
- K.Balkwill – Kevin Balkwill (born 1958)
- K.Bergius – Karl Heinrich Bergius (1790–1818)
- K.Brandegee – Mary Katharine Brandegee (1844–1920)
- K.Brandt – Andreas Heinrich Karl Brandt (1854–1931)
- K.Bremer – Kåre Bremer (born 1948)
- K.C.Davis – Kary Cadmus Davis (1867–1936)
- K.D.Hill – Kenneth D. Hill (1948–2010)
- K.D.Koenig – Charles (Karl) Dietrich Eberhard Koenig (König) (1774–1851)
- Kearney – Thomas Henry Kearney (1874–1956)
- Keating – William Hippolitus (Hypolitus, Hypolite) Keating (1799–1844)
- Keay – Ronald William John Keay (1920–1998)
- Keck – Karl Keck (1825–1894)
- Keener – Carl Samuel Keener (born 1931)
- Keighery – Gregory John Keighery (born 1950)
- Keissl. – Karl von Keissler (1872–1965)
- Kellermann – Jürgen Kellermann (born 1972)
- Kellerm. – William Ashbrook Kellerman (1850–1908)
- Kellogg – Albert Kellogg (1813–1887)
- Kellow – Alison Valerie Kellow (born 1969)
- Kelly – Howard Atwood Kelly (1858–1943)
- Kelway – James Kelway (1871–1952)
- Kemmler – Carl Albert Kemmler (1813–1888)
- Kem.-Nath. – Liubov Kemularia-Nathadze (1891–1985)
- Keng – Yi Li Keng (1897–1975)
- Keng f. – Pai Chieh Keng (born 1917)
- Kenn. – George Golding Kennedy (1841–1918)
- Kenneally – Kevin Francis Kenneally (born 1945)
- Kenrick – Paul Kenrick (fl. 1999)
- Kent – William Saville-Kent (1845–1908)
- Ker – Charles Henry Bellenden Ker (1785–1871)
- Keraudren – Monique Keraudren (1928–1981)
- Kerch. – Oswald Charles Eugène Marie Ghislain de Kerchove de Denterghem (1844–1906)
- Kereszty – Zoltán Kereszty (born 1937)
- Ker Gawl. – John Bellenden Ker Gawler (1764–1842)
- Kerguélen – Michel François-Jacques Kerguélen (1928–1999)
- Kernst. – Ernst Kernstock (1852–1900)
- Kerr – Arthur Francis George Kerr (1877–1942)
- Kers – Lars Erik Kers (1931–2017)
- Kerst. – Otto Kersten (1839–1900)
- Kessler – Paul Joseph Antonius Kessler (born 1958)
- Keyserl. – Alexander Friedrich Michael Leberecht Arthur von Keyserling (1815–1891)
- K.F.Parker – Kittie Fenley Parker (1910–1994)
- K.F.R.Schneid. – Karl Friedrich Robert Schneider (1798–1872)
- K.F.Schimp. – Karl Friedrich Schimper (1803–1867)
- K.G.Pearce – Katharine Georgina Pearce (fl. 2003)
- K.Hammer – Karl Hammer (born 1944)
- Kharadze – Anna Lukianovna Kharadze (1905–1971)
- Khawkine – Mardochée-Woldemar Khawkine (1860–1930)
- K.Heyne – Karel Heyne (1877–1947)
- K.Hoffm. – Käthe Hoffmann (1883–1960)
- Khoon – Meng Wong Khoon (fl. 1982)
- Kiaersk. – Hjalmar Kiærskou (1835–1900)
- K.I.Chr. – Knud Ib Christensen (1955–2012)
- Kidst. – Robert Kidston (1852–1924)
- Kies – Pauline Kies (1918–1999)
- Kiew – Ruth Kiew (1946-2025)
- Kiger – Robert William Kiger (born 1940)
- Kiggel. – Franz (François, Franciscus) Kiggelaer (1648–1722)
- K.I.Goebel – Karl Ritter von Goebel (1855–1932) (also known as Karl Immanuel Eberhard Goebel)
- Killias – Eduard Killias (1829–1891)
- Killick – Donald Joseph Boomer Killick (1926–2008)
- Killip – Ellsworth Paine Killip (1890–1968)
- Killmann – Dorothee Killmann (born 1972)
- Kimnach – Myron William Kimnach (1922–2018)
- Kimura – Arika Kimura (1900–1996)
- Kindb. – Nils Conrad Kindberg (1832–1910)
- Kindt – Christian Sommer Kindt (1816–1903)
- King – George King (1840–1909)
- Kingdon-Ward – Frank Kingdon-Ward (1885–1958)
- Kinney – Abbot Kinney (1850–1920)
- Kippist – Richard Kippist (1812–1882)
- Kiran Raj – M. S. Kiran Raj (born 1975)
- Kirby – Mary Kirby (1817–1893)
- Kirchn. – Emil Otto Oskar von Kirchner (1851–1925)
- Kirk – Thomas Kirk (1828–1898)
- Kirp. – Moisey Elevich Kirpicznikov (1913–1995)
- Kirschl. – Frédéric Kirschleger (1804–1869)
- Kirschner – Jan Kirschner (born 1955)
- Kirschst. – Wilhelm Kirschstein (1863–1946)
- Kirt. – Kanhoba Ranchoddâs Kirtikar (1849–1917)
- Kissling – Jonathan Kissling (fl. 2009)
- Kit. – Pál Kitaibel (1757–1817)
- Kitag. – Masao Kitagawa (1910–1995)
- Kitam. – Siro Kitamura (1906–2002)
- Kitt. – Martin Baldwin Kittel (1798–1885)
- Kit Tan – Kit Tan (born 1953)
- Kittell – Mary Teresita Kittell (1892–1990)
- Kittlitz – Friedrich Heinrich von Kittlitz (1799–1871)
- Kittr. – Elsie May Kittredge (1870–1954)
- Kivir. - Kaarlo Eemeli Kivirikko (1870–1947)
- K.J.Brooks – K.J. Brooks (fl. 1998)
- K.J.Cowley – Kirsten Jane Cowley (born 1961)
- Kjellm. – Frans Reinhold Kjellman (1846–1907)
- K.Jess. – Knud Jessen (1884–1971)
- K.J.Kim – Ki Joong Kim (born 1957)
- K.J.Martin – Kenneth J. Martin (born 1942)
- K.J.Tucker – Kelsey J. Tucker (fl. 2018)
- K.J.Williams – Kyle Joseph Williams (born 1973)
- K.Koch – Karl Heinrich Emil Koch (1809–1879)
- K.Komatsu – Katsuko Komatsu (fl. 2003)
- K.Krause – Kurt Krause (1883–1963)
- K.Kurtz – Karl Marie Max Kurtz (1846–1910)
- Klack. – Jens Klackenberg (born 1951)
- K.Larsen – Kai Larsen (1926–2012)
- Klatt – Friedrich Wilhelm Klatt (1825–1897)
- K.L.Chambers – Kenton Lee Chambers (born 1929)
- Klopper – Ronell Renett Klopper (born 1974)
- Klein – Jacob Theodor Klein (1685–1759)
- Kleinig – David Arthur Kleinig (born 1947)
- Klinge – Johannes Christoph Klinge (1851–1902)
- K.L.McDougall – Keith Leonard McDougall (fl. 1956–)
- Klokov – Michail Vasiljevich Klokov (1896–1981)
- Kloos – Abraham Willem Kloos (1880–1952)
- Kloppenb. – Robert Dale Kloppenburg (born 1921)
- Klotzsch – Johann Friedrich Klotzsch (1805–1860)
- K.l.Xiang – Kun Li Xiang (fl. 2016)
- K.Lyell – Katherine Murray Lyell (1817–1915)
- K.Madhus. – K. Madhusudhanan (fl. 2014)
- K.M.Drew – Kathleen Mary Drew-Baker (1901–1957)
- Kmet'ová – Eva Kmet'ová (born 1942)
- K.M.Feng – Kuo Mei Feng (1917–2007)
- K.M.Jenssen – Kolbjørn Mohn Jenssen (fl. 1986)
- K.M.Matthew – Koyapillil Mathai Matthew (1930–2004)
- K.Möbius – Karl Möbius (1825–1908)
- K.Morse – Keir Morse (born 1977)
- K.M.Proft – Kirstin M. Proft (fl. 2016)
- K.M.Purohit – Kshetra Mohan Purohit (born 1955)
- K.Müll. – Konrad Müller (born 1857)
- K.M.Wong – Khoon Meng Wong (born 1954)
- Knaben – Gunvor Snekvik Knaben (born 1911)
- K.Nakaj. – Kunio Nakajima (fl. 1951)
- Knapp – John Leonard Knapp (1767–1845)
- K.Naray. – K. Narayanaswami (fl. 1946)
- Knebel – Gottfried Knebel (born 1908)
- Knerr – Ellsworth Brownell Knerr (1861–1942)
- Kneuck. – Johann Andreas Kneucker (1862–1946)
- Knight – Joseph Knight (1778–1855)
- Knobl. – Emil Friedrich Knoblauch (1864–1936)
- Knorring – Olga Knorring (1887–1978)
- Knowles – George Beauchamp Knowles (1790–1862)
- Knowlt. – Frank Hall Knowlton (1860–1926)
- Knuth – Paul Knuth (1854–1899)
- Kny – Carl Ignaz Leopold Kny (1841–1916)
- Kobus – Jan Derk Kobus (1858–1910)
- Kobuski – Clarence Emmeren Kobuski (1900–1963)
- Koch – Johann Friedrich Wilhelm Koch (1759–1831)
- Kochummen – Kizhakkedathu Mathai Kochummen (1931–1999)
- Kocyan – Alexander Kocyan (born 1965)
- Kodela – Phillip Gerhard Kodela (born 1962)
- Koechlin – Jean Koechlin (1926–2009)
- Koehne – Bernhard Adalbert Emil Koehne (1848–1918)
- Koeler – Georg Ludwig Koeler (1765–1807)
- Koell. – Rudolf Albert von Koelliker (1817–1905)
- Koelle – Johann Ludwig Christian Koelle (1763–1797)
- K.Ohashi – Kazuaki Ohashi (fl. 2007)
- Koidz. – Gen-ichi Koidzumi (1883–1953)
- Kolak. – Alfred Alekseevich Kolakovsky (1906–1997)
- Kokwaro – John Ongayo Kokwaro (born 1940)
- Köie – Mogens Engell Köie (1911–2000)
- Kolb – Max Kolb (1829–1915)
- Kolberg – H.H. Kolberg (fl. 2001)
- Kolen. – Friedrich August (Anton) Rudolf Kolenati (1813–1864)
- Kom. – Vladimir Leontyevich Komarov (1869–1945)
- Komiya – Sadashi Komiya (born 1932)
- Kool – Anneleen Kool (fl. 2012)
- Koopmann – Karl Koopmann (fl. 1879–1900)
- Koord. – Sijfert Hendrik Koorders (1863–1919)
- Koord.-Schum. – Anna Koorders-Schumacher (1870–1934)
- Kops – Jan Kops (1765–1849)
- Körb. – Gustav Wilhelm Körber (1817–1885)
- Kores – Paul Joseph Kores (born 1950)
- Kôriba – Kwan Kôriba (1882–1957)
- Körn. – Friedrich August Körnicke (1828–1908)
- Kornh. – (Georg) Andreas von Kornhuber (1824–1905)
- Korol. – Valentina Alekseevna Koroleva, also Valentina Alekseevna Koroleva-Pavlova (1898–1986)
- Korovin – Yevgeny Petrovich Korovin (1891–1963)
- Korsh. – Sergei Ivanovitsch Korshinsky (1861–1900)
- Körte – Heinrich Friedrich Franz Körte (1782–1845)
- Korth. – Pieter Willem Korthals (1807–1892)
- K.Osada – Keigo Osada (born 1956)
- Košanin – Nedeljko Košanin (1874–1934)
- Kosky – William Kosky (fl. 2021)
- Koso-Pol. – Boris Mikhailovic Koso-Poljansky (1890–1957)
- Kostel. – Vincenz Franz Kosteletzky (1801–1887)
- Kosterm. – André Joseph Guillaume Henri Kostermans (1907–1994)
- Kotl. – František Kotlaba (1927–2020)
- Kotov – Mikhail Ivanovich Kotov (1896–1978)
- Kotschy – Carl Georg Theodor Kotschy (1813–1866)
- Kottek – Michael H. Kottek (fl. 1990)
- Kotyk – Michele E. Kotyk (fl. 2002)
- K.Põldmaa – Kadri Põldmaa (born 1970)
- K.Prasad – Kothareddy Prasad (born 1985)
- Kraenzl. – Friedrich Wilhelm Ludwig Kraenzlin (1847–1934)
- Krajina – Vladimir Joseph Krajina (1905–1993)
- Kral – Robert Kral (born 1926)
- Kralik – Jean-Louis Kralik (1813–1892)
- K.Ramach. – Kamala Ramachandran (born 1932)
- Krapov. – Antonio Krapovickas (1921–2015)
- Kras – Marta Kras (fl. 2006)
- Krasch. – Ippolit Mikhailovich Krascheninnikov (1884-1947)
- Kras-Lap. – Marta Kras-Lapinska (born 1969)
- Krasn. – Andrej Nikovaevich Krasnov (1862–1914)
- Krasser – Fridolin Krasser (1863–1923)
- Kraus – Gregor Konrad Michael Kraus (1841–1915)
- Krause – Johann Wilhelm Krause (1764–1842)
- Kräusel – Richard Oswald Karl Kräusel (1890–1966)
- Krauskopf – Engelbert Krauskopf (1820–1881)
- Krauss – Johan Carl Krauss (1759–1826)
- Krebs – Georg Ludwig Engelhard Krebs (1792–1844)
- Kremp. – August von Krempelhuber (1813–1882)
- Kreutz – Carolus Adrianus Johannes Kreutz (born 1954)
- Kreuz. – Kurt Kreuzinger (1905–1989)
- Kreyer – Georgij Karlowic Kreyer (1887–1942)
- K.Richt. – Karl Richter (1855–1891)
- Krock. – Anton Johann Krocker (1744–1823)
- Krok – Thorgny Ossian Bolivar Napoleon Krok (1834–1921)
- Kromb. – Jean-Henri-Guillaume Krombach (1791–1881)
- Krombh. – Julius Vincenz von Krombholz (1782–1843)
- Kron – Kathleen Anne Kron (born 1956)
- K.R.Robertson – Kenneth R. Robertson (born 1941)
- K.Rosenth. – Käthe Rosenthal (1893–1942)
- K.R.Thiele – Kevin R. Thiele (fl. 1998)
- Krug – Karl (Carl) Wilhelm Leopold Krug (1833–1898)
- Krukoff – Boris Alexander Krukoff (1898–1983)
- Kruschke – Emil Paul Kruschke (1907–1976)
- Krüssm. – Johann Gerd Krüssmann (1910–1980)
- Krylov – Porfirij Nikitich Krylov (1850–1931)
- K.Schum. – Karl Moritz Schumann (1851–1904)
- K.S.Lee – Kyung Seo Lee (fl. 1998)
- K.S.Prasad – Karuvankoodelu Subrahmanya Prasad (born 1983)
- Kubitzki – Klaus Kubitzki (1933–2022)
- Kuchel – Rex Harold Kuchel (1917–1985~6)
- Kudô – Yûshun Kudô (1887–1932)
- Kuhbier – Manfred Heinrich Kuhbier (born 1934)
- Kuhl – Heinrich Kuhl (1797–1821)
- Kuhlm. – João Geraldo Kuhlmann (1882–1958)
- Kuhn – Friedrich Adalbert Maximilian Kuhn (1842–1894)
- Kühnem. – Oscar Kühnemann (1911–1999)
- Kuijt – Job Kuijt (born 1930)
- Kük. – Georg Kükenthal (1864–1955)
- Kułak – Magdalena Kułak (fl. 2006)
- Kulju – Kristo K.M. Kulju (fl. 2005)
- Kumar – Pankaj Kumar (born 1975)
- Kunkel – Louis Otto Kunkel (1884–1960)
- Kunth – Carl Sigismund Kunth (1788–1850)
- Kuntze – Carl Ernst Otto Kuntze (1843–1907)
- Kunze – Gustav Kunze (1793–1851)
- Kuo Huang – Ling Lung Kuo Huang (fl. 2005)
- Kupfer – Elsie Kupfer (1877–1974)
- Kupicha – Frances Kristina Kupicha (1947–2013)
- Kuprian. – Ludmila Kuprianova (1914–1987)
- Kurata – S. Kurata (fl. 1931)
- Kurbanb. – Z. K. Kurbanbekov (born 1935)
- Kurbanov – D. K. Kurbanov (born 1946)
- Kurbatsky – Vladimir Ivanovich Kurbatsky (born 1941)
- Kurczenko – Elena Ivanovna Kurczenko (born 1935)
- Kurib. – Kazue Kuribayashi (died 1954)
- Kurita – Siro Kurita (born 1936)
- Kurkiev – Uolubii Kishtishevich Kurkiev (born 1937)
- Kurl. – Boguslav Stanislavovich Kurlovich (born 1948)
- Kurogi – Munengo Kurogi (1921–1988)
- Kurok. – Syo Kurokawa (1926–2010)
- Kurr – Johann Gottlob von Kurr (1798–1870)
- Kürschner – Harald Kürschner (born 1950)
- Kurtto – Arto Kurtto (born 1951)
- Kurtz – Fritz (Federico) Kurtz (1854–1920)
- Kurtzman – Cletus P. Kurtzman (1938–2017)
- Kurz – Wilhelm Sulpiz Kurz (1834–1878)
- Kurzweil – Hubert Kurzweil (born 1958)
- Kusn. – Nicolai Ivanowicz Kusnezow (1864–1932)
- Küster – Ernst Küster (1874–1953)
- Kuswata – E. Kuswata Kartawinata (born 1936)
- Kütz. – Friedrich Traugott Kützing (1807–1893)
- Kuusk – Vilma Kuusk (born 1931)
- K.V.George – K.V. George (fl. 1960)
- K.Watan. – Kuniaki Watanabe (fl. 2001)
- K.W.Dixon – Kingsley Wayne Dixon (born 1954)
- K.Wilh. – Karl Adolf Wilhelm (1848–1933)
- K.W.Jiang – Kaiwen Jiang (fl. 2020)
- K.Y.Lang – Kai Yung Lang (born 1937)
- K.Y.Pan – Kai Yu Pan (born 1937)

== L ==
Contents: Top	A	B	C	D	E F	G	H	I J	K L	M	N O	P	Q R	S	T U V	W X Y Z

- L. – Carl Linnaeus (or Carolus Linnæus) (1707–1778)
- Labat – Jean-Noël Labat (1959–2011)
- Labill. – Jacques Labillardière (1755–1834)
- Labrecque – Jacques Labrecque (fl. 1996)
- Labuda – Roman Labuda (fl. 2008)
- Lacaita – Charles Carmichael Lacaita (1853–1933)
- Lace – John Henry Lace (1857–1918)
- Lachen. – Werner de Lachenal (1736–1800)
- Lackovičová – Anna Lackovičová (fl. 2010)
- Ladiges – Pauline Y. Ladiges (born 1948)
- La Duke – John C. La Duke (born 1950)
- Laest. – Lars Levi Læstadius (Laestadius) (1800–1861)
- Laferr. – Joseph E. Laferrière (born 1955)
- LaFrankie – James Vincent LaFrankie (1956-2022)
- Lag. – Mariano Lagasca y Segura (1776–1839)
- Lagerh. – Nils Gustaf von Lagerheim (1860–1926)
- Lahman – Bertha Marion Lahman (1872–1950)
- Laib. – Friedrich Laibach (1885–1967)
- Laing – Robert Malcolm Laing (1865–1941)
- L.A.J.Thomson – Lex Allan James Thomson (born 1957)
- Lakela – Olga Korhoven Lakela (1890–1980)
- Lakow. – Conrad Waldemar Lakowitz (1859–1945)
- La Llave – Pablo de La Llave (1773–1833)
- L.Allorge – Lucile Allorge (1937–2023)
- Lally – Terena R. Lally (fl. 2008)
- Lam. – Jean-Baptiste Lamarck (1744–1829)
- Lama – Dorjay Lama (fl. 1992)
- Lamb. – Aylmer Bourke Lambert (1761–1842)
- Lammers – Thomas G. Lammers (born 1955)
- Lamond – Jenifer M. Lamond (born 1936)
- Lamont – Byron Barnard Lamont (born 1945)
- Lamy – Pierre Marie Édouard Lamy de la Chapelle (1804–1886)
- Lancaster – Charles Roy Lancaster (born 1937)
- Lander – Nicholas Sèan Lander (born 1948)
- L.Andersson – Bengt Lennart Andersson (1948–2005)
- Landolt – Elias Landolt (1926–2013)
- Landrum – Leslie R. Landrum (born 1946)
- Lane-Poole – Charles Edward Lane-Poole (1885–1970)
- Laness. – Jean Marie Antoine de Lanessan (1843–1919)
- Lange – Johan Martin Christian Lange (1818–1898)
- Langenh. – Jean Harmon Langenheim (1925–2021)
- Langeron – Maurice Charles Pierre Langeron (1874–1950)
- Langeth. – Christian Eduard Langethal (1806–1878)
- Langsd. – Georg Heinrich von Langsdorff (1774–1852)
- Lank. – E. Ray Lankester (1847–1929)
- Lantz.-Bén. – Georg Boyung Scato Lantzius-Béninga (1815–1871)
- Lapeyr. – Baron Philippe-Isidore Picot de Lapeyrouse (La Peirouse) (1744–1818)
- Lapham – Increase Allen Lapham (1811–1875)
- Larrañaga – Dámaso Antonio Larrañaga (1771–1848)
- Larter – Clara Ethelinda Larter (1847–1936)
- L.A.S.Johnson – Lawrence Alexander Sidney Johnson (1925–1997)
- Lassen – Per Lassen (born 1942)
- Lasser – Tobías Lasser (1911–2006)
- Latap. – François-de-Paule Latapie (1739–1823)
- Laterr. – Jean François Laterrade (1784–1858)
- Latiff – Abdul Latiff (fl. 1989)
- Lat.-Marl. – Joseph Bory Latour-Marliac (1830–1911)
- Latourr. – Marc Antoine Louis Claret de La Tourrette (1729–1793)
- Latz – Peter K. Latz (born 1941)
- Laun. – Jean Claude Michel Mordant de Launay (1750–1816)
- Laurer – Johann Friedrich Laurer (1798–1873)
- Lauterb. – Carl Adolf Georg Lauterbach (1864–1937)
- Lauterborn – Robert Lauterborn (1869–1952)
- Lauz.-March. – Marguerite Lauzac-Marchal (fl. 1974)
- Lavallée – Pierre Alphonse Martin Lavallée (1836–1884)
- Lavarack – Peter S. ('Bill') Lavarack (fl. 1975)
- Lavranos – John Jacob Lavranos (1926–2018)
- Lavrent. – Georgios Lavrentiades (born 1920)
- Lawalrée – André Gilles Célestin Lawalrée (1921–2005)
- Lawrance – Mary Lawrance (fl. 1790–1831)
- Lawson – George Lawson (1827–1895)
- Laxm. – Erich G. Laxmann (1737–1796)
- L.A.Ye – Lwin Aung Ye (fl. 2017–)
- Layens – Georges de Layens (1834–1897)
- Laz. – Andrei Sazontovich Lazarenko (1901–1979)
- L.B.Moore – Lucy Beatrice Moore (1906–1987)
- L.Bolus – Harriet Margaret Louisa Bolus (née Kensit) (1877–1970)
- L.Borgen – Liv Borgen (born 1943)
- L.B.Sm. – Lyman Bradford Smith (1904–1997)
- L.Clark – Lois Clark (1884–1967)
- L.C.Leach – Leslie Charles Leach (1909–1996)
- L.C.Wheeler – Louis Cutter Wheeler (1910–1980)
- L.D.Benson – Lyman David Benson (1909–1993)
- L.D.Gómez – Luis Diego Gómez (1944–2009)
- L.D.Pryor – Lindsay Pryor (1915–1998)
- Lea – Thomas Gibson Lea (1785–1844)
- Leadlay – Etelka A. Leadlay (born 1947)
- L.E.Anderson – Lewis Edward Anderson (1912–2007)
- Leandri – Jacques Désiré Leandri (1903–1982)
- Leandro – P. Leandro do Sacramento (1778–1829)
- Leaney – R.M. Leaney (fl. 2009)
- Leav. – Robert Greenleaf Leavitt (1865–1942)
- Leavenw. – Melines Conklin Leavenworth (1796–1832)
- L.E.Bishop – Luther Earl Bishop (1943–1991)
- Lebrun – Jean Paul Antoine Lebrun (1906–1985)
- Leclercq – Suzanne Céline Marie Leclercq (1901–1994)
- Lecomte – Paul Henri Lecomte (1856–1934)
- Leconte – John (Eatton) Leconte (1784–1860)
- Lecoq – Henri Lecoq (1802–1871)
- Lecoy. – Joseph Cyprien Lecoyer (1835–1899)
- Ledeb. – Carl Friedrich von Ledebour (1785–1851)
- Leefe – John Ewbank Leefe (1813–1889)
- Leeke – Georg Gustav Paul Leeke (1883–1933)
- Leenh. – Pieter Willem Leenhouts (1926–2004)
- Leerat. – Charan Leeratiwong (fl. 2003)
- Leers – Johann Georg Daniel Leers (1727–1774)
- Lees – Edwin Lees (1800–1887)
- Leeuwenb. – Anthonius Josephus Maria Leeuwenberg (1930–2010)
- Legrand – Antoine Legrand (1839–1905)
- Lehm. – Johann Georg Christian Lehmann (1792–1860)
- Lehnebach – Carlos Adolfo Lehnebach (born 1974)
- Leibold (also F.E.Leyb.) – Friedrich Ernst Leibold (surname also spelled "Leybold") (1804–1864) (not to be confused with botanist Friedrich Leybold (1827–1879))
- Leichtlin – Maximilian Leichtlin (1831–1910)
- Leight. – William Allport Leighton (1805–1889)
- Leitg. – Hubert Leitgeb (1835–1888)
- Leitn. – Edward Frederick Leitner (1812–1838)
- Lej. – Alexandre Louis Simon Lejeune (1779–1858)
- Le Jol. – Auguste François Le Jolis (1823–1904)
- Lellinger – David B. Lellinger (born 1937)
- Lelong – Michel G. Lelong (born 1932)
- Lem. – Charles Antoine Lemaire (1800–1871)
- Le Maout – Jean Emmanuel Maurice Le Maout (1799–1877)
- Leme – Elton Leme (born 1960)
- Lemée – Albert Marie Victor Lemée (1872–1961)
- Lemmerm. – Ernst Johann Lemmermann (1867–1915)
- Lemmon – John Gill Lemmon (1832–1908)
- Lemoine – (Pierre Louis) Victor Lemoine (1823–1911)
- Le Monn. – Louis-Guillaume Le Monnier (1717–1799)
- Lémon – Nicolas Lémon (1787-1837)
- Lemson – Kristina L. Lemson (fl. 2007)
- L.E.Navas – Luisa Eugenia Navas (1920–2020)
- Lenorm. – Sébastien René Lenormand (1796–1871)
- León – Frère León (Joseph Sylvestre Sauget) (1871–1955)
- Leonard – Emery Clarence Leonard (1892–1968)
- Lepage – Ernest Lepage (1905–1981)
- Lepech. – Ivan Ivanovich Lepechin (1737–1802)
- Lepr. – François Mathias René Leprieur (1799–1869)
- Lepschi – Brendan John Lepschi (born 1969)
- Leresche – Louis François Jules Rodolphe Leresche (1808–1885)
- L.E.Rodin – Leonid Efimovich Rodin (1907–1990)
- Leroy – André Leroy (1801–1875)
- Les – Donald H. Les (born 1954)
- Lesch. – Jean-Baptiste Leschenault de La Tour (1773–1826)
- L.E.Skog – Laurence Edgar Skog (born 1943)
- Lesq. – Charles Léo Lesquereux (1806–1889)
- Less. – Christian Friedrich Lessing (1809–1862)
- Lester – Richard Neville Lester (1937–2006)
- Le Thomas – Annick Le Thomas (1936–2024)
- Letouzey – René Letouzey (1918–1989)
- Leunis – Johannes Leunis (1802 –1873)
- Letr.-Gal. – Marie-Agnès Letrouit-Galinou (born 1931)
- Leussink – Jan A. Leussink (fl. 1979)
- Lév. – Joseph-Henri Léveillé (1796–1870)
- Levier – Emilio (or Émile) Levier (1839–1911)
- Levyns – Margaret Rutherford Bryan Levyns (1890–1975)
- L.E.Watson – Linda E. Watson (fl. 1990)
- Lewej. – Klaus Lewejohann (born 1937)
- Lewin – Ralph Arnold Lewin (1921–2008)
- Lewis – Meriwether Lewis (1774–1809)
- Lewton – Frederick Lewis Lewton (1874–1959)
- Lex. – Juan José Martinez de Lexarza (1785–1824)
- Leyb. – Friedrich Leybold (1827–1879) (not to be confused with botanist Friedrich Ernst Leibold (1804–1864), whose surname was also sometimes spelled "Leybold")
- Leyss. – Friedrich Wilhelm von Leysser (1731–1815)
- L.f. – Carl Linnaeus the Younger (1741–1783)
- L.F.Hend. – Louis Forniquet Henderson (1853–1942)
- L.Fisch. – Ludvig Fischer (1828–1907)
- L.Fuchs – Leonhart Fuchs (1501–1566)
- L.G.Clark – Lynn G. Clark (born 1956)
- L.G.Cook – Lyn G. Cook (fl. 2017)
- L.Gentil – Théodore August Louis François Gentil (1874–1949)
- L.G.Lohmann – Lúcia Garcez Lohmann (born 1973)
- L.Guthrie – Louise Guthrie (1879–1966)
- L.G.Xu – Li Guo Xu (born 1936)
- L.H.Bailey – Liberty Hyde Bailey (1858–1954)
- L.H.Dewey – Lyster Hoxie Dewey (1865–1944)
- L.Henry – Louis Henry (1854–1913)
- L'Hér. – Charles Louis L'Héritier de Brutelle (1746–1800)
- L.H.Gray – Louis Harold Gray (1905–1965)
- L.Höhn. – Ludwig von Höhnel (1857–1942)
- Lhotsky – Johann Lhotsky (1800–1860s)
- Liais – Emmanuel Liais (1826–1900)
- Liang Ma – Liang Ma (fl. 2016)
- Lib. – Marie-Anne Libert (1782–1865)
- Liben – Louis Liben (1926–2006)
- Libosch. – Joseph Liboschitz (1783–1824)
- L.I.Cabrera – Lidia Irene Cabrera (born 1964)
- Licht. – Martin Lichtenstein (1780–1857)
- Liddle – David J. Liddle (?–2009)
- Lidén – Magnus Lidén (born 1951)
- Liebl. – Franz Kaspar (or Caspar) Lieblein (1744–1810)
- Liebm. – Frederik Michael Liebmann (1813–1856)
- Lightf. – John Lightfoot FRS (1735–1788)
- Lign. – Elie Antoine Octave Lignier (1855–1916)
- Lilj. – Samuel Liljeblad (1761–1815)
- Lilja – Nils Lilja (1808–1870)
- Lillie – Denis G. Lillie (1884–1963)
- Lillo – Miguel Lillo (1862–1931)
- Liltved – William Rune Liltved (born 1960)
- Limpr. – Karl Gustav Limpricht (1834–1902)
- Lincz. – Igor Alexandrovich Linczevski (1908–1997)
- Lindau – Gustav Lindau (1866–1923)
- Lindb. – Sextus Otto Lindberg (1835–1889)
- Lindeb. – Carl Johan Lindeberg (1815–1900)
- Linden – Jean Jules Linden (1817–1898)
- Lindenb. – Johann Bernhard Wilhelm Lindenberg (1781–1851)
- Lindh. – Ferdinand Lindheimer (1801–1879)
- Lindl. – John Lindley (1799–1865)
- Lindm. – Carl Axel Magnus Lindman (1856–1928)
- Lindq. – Sven Bertil Gunvald Lindquist (1904–1963)
- Lingelsh. – Alexander von Lingelsheim (1874–1937)
- Link – Johann Heinrich Friedrich Link (1767–1851)
- Linsbauer – Karl Linsbauer (1872–1934)
- Linton – William James Linton (1812–1897)
- Lippold – Hans Lippold (1932–1980)
- Lipsky – Vladimir Ippolitovich Lipsky (1863–1937)
- L.I.Savicz – Lydia Ivanovna Savicz-Lubitskaya (1886–1982)
- Lisboa – José Camillo Lisboa (1823–1897)
- Lisická – Eva Lisická (fl. 2005)
- Litard. – René Verriet de Litardière (1888–1957)
- Little – Elbert Luther Little (1907–2004)
- Litv. – Dmitrij Ivanovitsch Litvinov (1854–1929)
- Livingst. – C. Livingstone (born 1949)
- Lizoň – Pavel Lizoň (born 1945)
- L.J.Chen – Li Jun Chen (born 1980)
- L.J.Davenp. – Lawrence James Davenport (born 1952)
- Lj.N.Vassiljeva – Ljubov Nikolaevna Vassiljeva (1901–1985)
- L.K.Escobar – Linda Katherine Escobar (1940–1993)
- L.K.Fu – Li-kuo Fu (born 1934)
- Llanos – Antonio Llanos (1806–1881)
- L.L.Daniel – Lucien Louis Daniel (1856–1940)
- L.Li – Lin Li (fl. 2008)
- L.Liu – Liang Liu (1933–2001)
- L.Ll.Phillips – Lyle Llewellyn Phillips (born 1923)
- L.L.Zhou – Linlin Zhou (fl. 2009)
- L.M.Ames – Lawrence Marion Ames (1900–1966)
- L.Martin – Lucille Martin (born 1925)
- L.Martins – Ludwig Martins (fl. 2005)
- L.McCulloch – Lucia McCulloch (1873–1955)
- L.McDougall – Lyn McDougall (fl. 1990)
- L.M.Copel. – Lachlan Mackenzie Copeland (born 1973)
- L.M.H.Schmid – Luzie M.H. Schmid (born 1999)
- L.M.Perry – Lily May Perry (1895–1992)
- L.M.Vidal – Luis Mariano Vidal (1842–1922)
- L.Newton – Lily Newton (1893–1981)
- L.Nutt. – Lawrence William Nuttall (1857–1933)
- Lobel – Matthias de l'Obel (de Lobel) (or Matthaeus Lobelius) (1538–1616)
- Lockh. – David Lockhart (died 1846)
- Lodd. – Joachim Conrad Loddiges (1738–1826)
- Lodé – Joël Lodé (born 1952)
- Loefl. – Pehr Loefling (1729–1756)
- Loes. – Ludwig Eduard Theodor Loesener (1865–1941)
- Loesel – Johannes Loesel (1607–1655)
- Loeske – Leopold Loeske (1865–1935)
- Loher – August Loher (1874–1930)
- Loisel. – Jean-Louis-Auguste Loiseleur-Deslongchamps (1774–1849)
- Lojac. – Michele Lojacono (1853–1919)
- Lom – Jiří Lom (1931–2010)
- Lomakin – Aleksandr Aleksandrovich Lomakin (1863–1930)
- Lombardi – Julio Antonio Lombardi (born 1961)
- Londoño — Ximena Londoño (born 1958)
- Long – William Henry Long (1867–1947)
- Longyear – Burton Orange Longyear (1868–1969)
- Lonitzer – Adam Lonicer (Lonitzer) (also as Adamus Lonicerus) (1528–1586)
- Lönnrot – Elias Lönnrot (1802–1884)
- Loo – Adrian Hock Beng Loo (fl. 2004)
- Loosjes – Adriaan Loosjes (1761–1818)
- López Laphitz – Rita María López Laphitz (fl. 2011)
- Lorch – Wilhelm Lorch (1867–1954)
- Lord – Ernest E. Lord (1899–1970)
- Lorence – David H. Lorence (born 1946)
- Lorentz – Paul Günther Lorentz (1835–1881)
- Losa – Taurino Mariano Losa (1893–1965)
- Loschnigg – Vilim Loschnigg or Wilhelm Loschnigg (born 1897)
- Losinsk. – Agnia Sergeyevna Losina-Losinskaja (1903–1958)
- Lothian – Thomas Robert Noel Lothian (1915–2004)
- Lotsy – Johannes Paulus Lotsy (1867–1931)
- Lott – Henry J. Lott (fl. 1938)
- Loudon – John Claudius Loudon (1783–1843)
- Lounsb. – Alice Lounsberry (1872–1949)
- Lour. – João de Loureiro (1717–1791)
- Lourteig – Alicia Lourteig (1913–2003)
- Lousã – Mário Fernandes Lousã (born 1940)
- Love – Robert Merton Love (1909–1994)
- Lowe – Richard Thomas Lowe (1802–1874)
- L.O.Williams – Louis Otho Williams (1908–1991)
- Lowrey – Timothy K. Lowrey (born 1953)
- Lowrie – Allen Lowrie (1948–2021)
- Lowry – Porter Prescott Lowry (born 1956)
- Lozano – Gustavo Lozano-Contreras (1938–2000)
- L.Planch. – Louis David Planchon (1858–1915)
- L.Post – Ernst Jakob (Jacob) Lennart von Post (1884–1951)
- L.Preiss – Ludwig Preiss (1811–1883)
- L.R.Blinks – Lawrence Rogers Blinks (1900–1989)
- L.R.Fraser – Lilian Ross Fraser (1908–1987)
- L.Rico – Maria de Lourdes Rico (born 1955)
- L.R.Jones – Lewis Ralph Jones (1864–1945)
- L.R.Kerr – Lesley Ruth Kerr (1900–1927)
- L.R.Landrum – Leslie R. Landrum (born 1946)
- L.Schneid. – Eduard Karl Ludwig Schneider (1809–1889)
- L.Söderstr. – Lars Söderström (born 1954)
- L.Späth – Louis Späth (fl. 1892)
- L.S.Sm. – Lindsay Stuart Smith (1917–1970)
- L.T.Lu – Ling Ti Lu (born 1930)
- L.T.Monks – Leonie T. Monks (fl. 2023)
- Lubag-Arquiza – Amihan Mercado Lubag-Arquiza (born 1967)
- Lucand – Jean Louis Lucand (1821–1896)
- Luces – Zoraida Luces de Febres (1922–2015)
- Lückel – Emil Lückel (born 1927)
- Ludlow – Frank Ludlow (1885–1972)
- Luehm. – Johann George W. Luehmann (1843–1904)
- Luer – Carlyle A. Luer (1922–2019)
- Luetzelb. – Philipp von Luetzelburg (1880–1948)
- Luferov – Aleksandr Nikolaevich Luferov (born 1957)
- Lumley – Peter Francis Lumley (born 1938)
- Lundell – Cyrus Longworth Lundell (1907–1994)
- Lundin – Roger Lundin (1955–2005)
- Lundmark – Johan Daniel Lundmark (1755–1792)
- Lunell – Joël Lunell (1851–1920)
- L.Uribe – Antonio Lorenzo Uribe Uribe (1900–1980)
- Lush. – Alfred Wyndham Lushington (1860–1920)
- Lüth – Michael Lüth (fl. 2002)
- Lütjeh. – Wilhelm Jan Lütjeharms (1907–1983)
- Lutz – Berta Maria Júlia Lutz (1894–1976)
- Luxf. – George Luxford (1807–1854)
- L.Watson – Leslie Watson (born 1938)
- L.W.Cayzer – Lindy W. Cayzer (born 1952)
- L.W.Lenz – Lee Wayne Lenz (1915–2019)
- L.W.Sage – Leigh William Sage (born 1970)
- Lý – Trân Ðinh Lý (born 1939)
- Lyall – David Lyall (1817–1895)
- Lydgate – John Mortimer Lydgate (1854–1922)
- Lye – Kaare Arnstein Lye (1940–2021)
- Lyell – Charles Lyell (1767–1849)
- Lyne – Andrew M. Lyne (fl. 1993)
- Lyons – Israel Lyons (1739–1775)
- Lysak – Martin A. Lysak (fl. 2019)

== M–Z ==
Contents: Top	A	B	C	D	E F	G	H	I J	K L	M	N O	P	Q R	S	T U V	W X Y Z

To find entries for M–Z, use the table of contents above.

== See also ==
- List of South African plant botanical authors
- List of botanists
- Category:Botanists
- List of Russian botanists
- List of zoologists by author abbreviation
