= Krombach =

Krombach may refer to:

== Places ==
=== Germany ===
- Krombach, Bavaria, a community
- Krombach (Kreuztal), a community in the town of Kreuztal, North Rhine-Westphalia
- Krombach, Thuringia, a municipality
- Krombach (river), Bavaria
- Krombach Reservoir - see List of lakes of Rhineland-Palatinate

=== Elsewhere ===
- German name for Krompach, Czech Republic
- German name for Krompachy, Slovakia

== People ==
- Dieter Krombach, German physician and serial rapist convicted of involuntary manslaughter in the 1982 death of his stepdaughter
- Jean-Henri-Guillaume Krombach (1791–1881), German-Luxembourgish pharmacist and botanist
