= Leybold =

Leybold is a German surname. Notable people with the surname include:

- Friedrich Leybold (1827–1879), German-Chilean pharmacist and naturalist
- Hans Leybold (1892–1914), German expressionist poet

== See also ==
- Leibold
- Leybold GmbH, vacuum technology company based in Cologne, Germany
