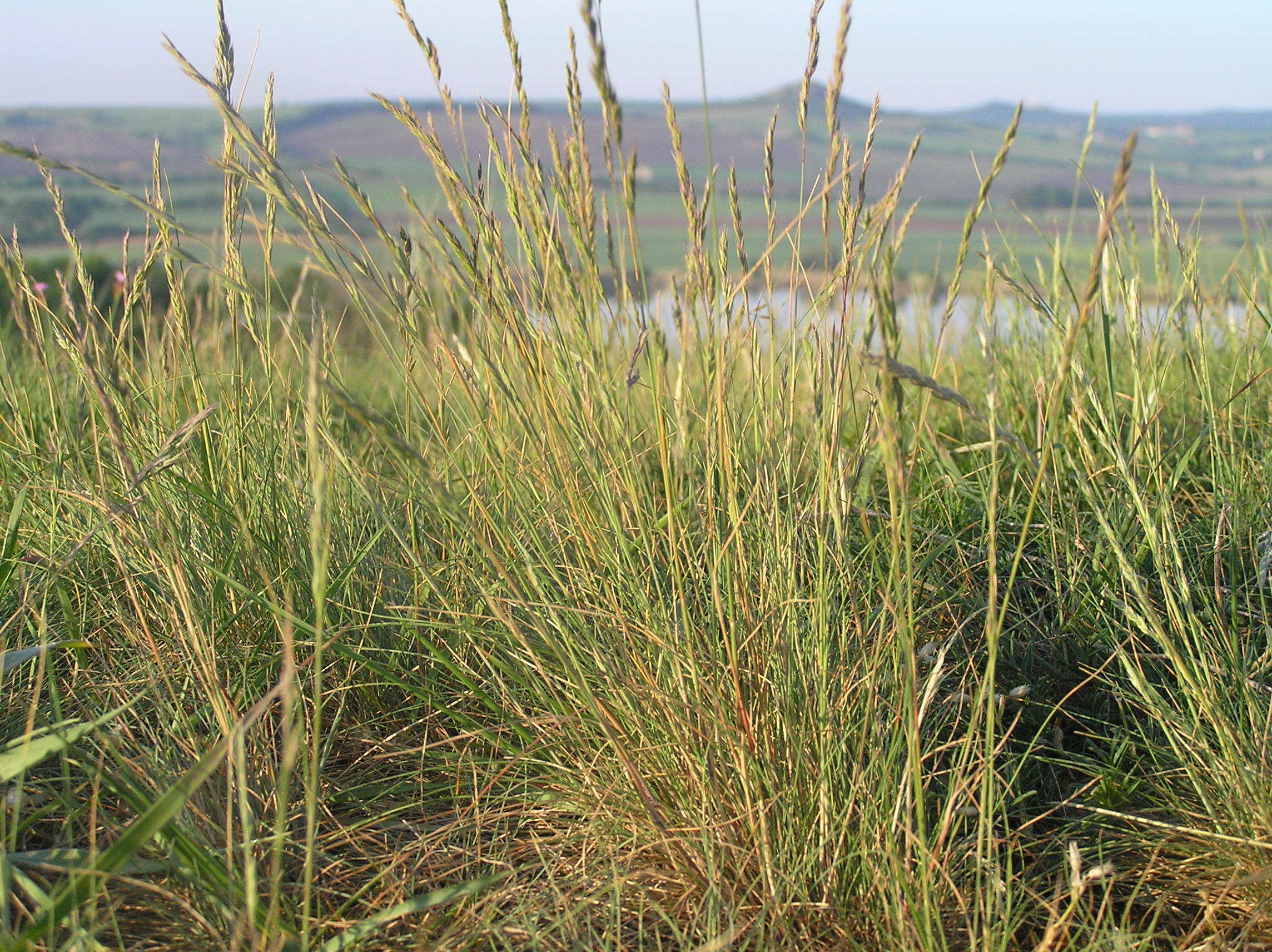

Scientific classification
- Kingdom: Plantae
- Clade: Tracheophytes
- Clade: Angiosperms
- Clade: Monocots
- Clade: Commelinids
- Order: Poales
- Family: Poaceae
- Subfamily: Pooideae
- Genus: Festuca
- Species: F. valesiaca

Binomial name
- Festuca valesiaca Schleich. ex Gaudin

Synonyms
- List: Festuca pannonica Wulfen; Sesleria valesiaca P.Beauv. ex Steud.; Festuca duriuscula var. valesiaca (Schleich. ex Gaudin) Bluff & Fingerh.; Festuca duriuscula var. hirsuta Gaudin; Festuca communis var. valesiaca (Schleich. ex Gaudin) Petif; Festuca ovina var. hirsuta (Gaudin) Link; Festuca ovina var. valesiaca (Schleich. ex Gaudin) Link; Festuca glauca var. filiformis Kirschl.; Festuca pallens var. valesiaca (Schleich. ex Gaudin) Opiz; Festuca ovina var. glaucescens Kirschl.; Festuca ovina var. pannonica (Wulfen) Alef.; Festuca duriuscula var. parviflora Hack.; Festuca ovina subvar. hirsuta (Gaudin) Hack.; Festuca sulcata subsp. valesiaca (Schleich. ex Gaudin) Nyman; Festuca sulcata var. valesiaca (Schleich. ex Gaudin) Hervier; Festuca sulcata var. wagneri Degen, Thaisz & Flatt.; Festuca ovina subsp. valesiaca (Schleich. ex Gaudin) Rouy; Festuca valesiaca f. banatica Degen; Festuca biformis J.Vetter; Festuca reptans J.Vetter; Festuca calcigena J.Vetter; Festuca diluta J.Vetter; Festuca firma J.Vetter; Festuca interjecta J.Vetter; Festuca saxicola Vetter; Festuca ronnigeri J.Vetter; Festuca sulcata var. valesiaca P.Fourn.; Festuca valesiaca f. arida Reverd.; Festuca valesiaca f. crassifolia Reverd.; Festuca valesiaca f. densiuscula Reverd.; Festuca valesiaca var. strictifolia Krajina; Festuca duriuscula subsp. valesiaca (Schleich. ex Gaudin) P.Fourn.; Festuca kirghisorum Kaschenko; Festuca glauca var. pannonica (Wulfen) Soó; Festuca squamulosa Ovcz. & Shibkova; Festuca sulcata f. subrupicola Nyár.; Festuca meredisensis A.Nyár.; Festuca valesiaca subf. craiovensis Buia & A.Nyár.; Festuca valesiaca subf. hirtula A.Nyár.; Festuca valesiaca subf. longifolia Ravarut ex A.Nyár.; Festuca valesiaca subf. viridis A.Nyár.; Festuca rupicola subsp. kirghisorum Tzvelev; Festuca meredisensis f. subrupicola (Nyár.) Soó; Festuca rupicola f. hirsuta (Gaudin) Beldie; Festuca valesiaca f. craiovensis (Buia & A.Nyár.) Beldie; Festuca valesiaca f. longifolia (Ravarut ex A.Nyár.) Beldie; Festuca valesiaca f. hirtula (A.Nyár.) Beldie; Festuca valesiaca f. viridis (A.Nyár.) Beldie; Festuca rupicola var. hirsuta (Gaudin) Tzvelev; Festuca valesiaca var. banatica (Degen) Beldie; Festuca pallens subsp. pannonica (Wulfen ex Host) Soó; Festuca valesiaca var. hirsuta (Gaudin) E.B.Alexeev; Festuca valesiaca subsp. kirghisorum (Tzvelev) Tzvelev; Festuca kirghisorum (Tzvelev) E.B.Alexeev; Festuca rupicola var. hirsuta (Gaudin) Tzvelev

= Festuca valesiaca =

Species of grass

Festuca valesiaca, the Volga fescue, is a species of flowering plant in the family Poaceae. It is native to Europe and Asia. It was introduced to North America when it was deliberately planted. There it can be found in such US states as Arizona, Kansas, Montana, Vermont and Wyoming.
