= Leibold =

Leibold is a surname of German origin. It may refer to:

- Friedrich Ernst Leibold (1804–1864), German gardener and botanical collector
- Nemo Leibold (1892–1977), American baseball player
- Paul Francis Leibold (1914–1972), American clergyman
- Tim Leibold (born 1993), German footballer

== See also ==
- Leybold
