= Leitgeb =

Leitgeb is a German surname. Notable people with the surname include:

- Christoph Leitgeb (born 1985), Austrian footballer
- Hannes Leitgeb (born 1972), Austrian philosopher and mathematician
- Hubert Leitgeb (biathlete) (1965–2012), Italian biathlete
- Hubert Leitgeb (botanist), (1835–1888), Austrian botanist
- Mario Leitgeb (born 1988), Austrian footballer
