= False tomodon snake =

Conservation status
- Least Concern (IUCN 3.1)

Scientific classification
- Kingdom: Animalia
- Phylum: Chordata
- Class: Reptilia
- Order: Squamata
- Suborder: Serpentes
- Family: Colubridae
- Genus: Tachymenis
- Species: T. trigonatus

Binomial name
- Tachymenis trigonatus (Leybold, 1873)

Synonyms
- Pelias trigonatus Leybold, 1873; Pseudotomodon trigonatus (Leybold, 1873); Tomodon ocellatus trigonatus (Leybold, 1873); Pseudotomodon mendozinus Koslowsky, 1896; Pseudotomodon crivellii Peracca, 1897

Species of snake

The false tomodon snake (Tachymenis trigonatus) is a species of venomous snake in the subfamily Dipsadinae of the family Colubridae. The species is endemic to Argentina.

== Taxonomy ==
Tachymenis trigonatus is part of the 36 species of the tribe Tachymenini.

== Geographic distribution ==
Tachymenis trigonatus is found in the western and southern regions of the Monte Desert in western Argentina.

== Habitat ==
The preferred natural habitat of Tachymenis trigonatus is shrubland.

== Characteristics ==
The false tomodon snake is characterized by its coloration and number of scales. As part of the genus Tachymenis, it has morphological characters of maxillary teeth with grooved fangs, and a vertical pupil. The false tomodon snake has eight or fewer maxillary teeth. The body is marked dorsally by a distinguishing yellowish vertebral line. The dorsal scales are arranged in 19 rows at midbody. Adults have a total length (tail included) of about 45 cm (18 in).

== Behavior ==
Tachymenis trigonatus is terrestrial.

== Reproduction ==
Tachymenis trigonatus is ovoviviparous.
