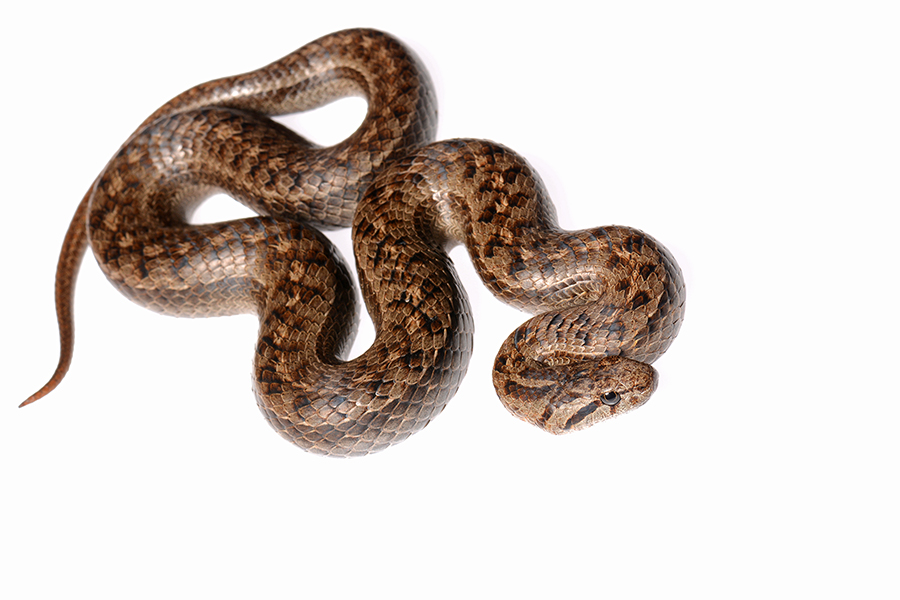
- Tachymenis peruviana

Scientific classification
- Kingdom: Animalia
- Phylum: Chordata
- Class: Reptilia
- Order: Squamata
- Suborder: Serpentes
- Family: Colubridae
- Subfamily: Dipsadinae
- Genus: Tachymenis; Wiegmann, 1835

Species
- Three, see text.

= Tachymenis =

Genus of snakes

Tachymenis is a genus of venomous snakes belonging to the subfamily Dipsadinae of the family Colubridae. Species in the genus Tachymenis are commonly known as slender snakes or short-tailed snakes and are primarily found in southern South America. Tachymenis are rear-fanged (opisthoglyphous) and are capable of producing a medically significant bite, with at least one species, Tachymenis peruviana, responsible for human fatalities.

== Species ==
The following species are recognized by the Reptile Database.

- Tachymenis ocellata (A.M.C. Duméril, Bibron & A.H.A. Duméril, 1854) – ocellated pampas snake
- Tachymenis peruviana Wiegmann, 1835 – Peru slender snake
- Tachymenis trigonatus (Leybold, 1873) – false tomodon snake

Nota bene: A binomial authority in parentheses indicates that the species was originally described in genus other than Tachymenis.
