= Henophyton =

Scientific classification
- Kingdom: Plantae
- Clade: Tracheophytes
- Clade: Angiosperms
- Clade: Eudicots
- Clade: Rosids
- Order: Brassicales
- Family: Brassicaceae
- Genus: Henophyton; Coss. & Durieu

Synonyms
- Henonia Coss. & Durieu

Genus of plants

Henophyton is a genus of flowering plants belonging to the family Brassicaceae. Its native range is northern Africa. It is found in the countries of Algeria, Libya, Morocco and Tunisia.

The genus name of Henophyton is in honour of Jean Baptiste Adrien Hénon (1821–1896), a French military language interpreter, teacher of Arabic in Algeria and also plant collector. It was first published and described in Bull. Soc. Bot. France Vol.2 on page 625 in 1855.

Known species, according to Kew:

- Henophyton deserti (Coss. & Durieu) Coss. & Durieu
- Henophyton zygarrhenum (Maire) Gómez-Campo
