= Koelle =

Koelle is a German surname. It may refer to:

- Fritz Koelle (1895–1953), German sculptor
- Heinz-Hermann Koelle (1925–2011), German aerospace engineer and pilot
- Johann Ludwig Christian Koelle (1763–1797), German physician and botanist
- Sigismund Koelle (1820–1902), German Christian missionary and linguist
- Arthur Gaylord Koelle (1934-2016), Orange County Judge, District Attorney
