= Hubert Leitgeb =

Hubert Leitgeb may refer to:

- Hubert Leitgeb (biathlete) (1965–2012), Italian biathlete
- Hubert Leitgeb (botanist) (1835–1888), Austrian botanist
