= Leiboldia =

Scientific classification
- Kingdom: Plantae
- Clade: Tracheophytes
- Clade: Angiosperms
- Clade: Eudicots
- Clade: Asterids
- Order: Asterales
- Family: Asteraceae
- Tribe: Vernonieae
- Genus: Leiboldia; Schltdl.

Genus of flowering plants

Leiboldia is a genus of flowering plants belonging the family Asteraceae. It is also in the tribe Vernonieae.

It is native to Mexico.

The genus name of Leiboldia is in honour of Friedrich Ernst Leibold (1804–1864), a German gardener and botanical collector. It was first described and published in Linnaea Vol.19 on page 742 in 1847.

== Known species ==
According to Kew;

- Leiboldia guerreroana (S.B.Jones) H.Rob.
- Leiboldia serrata Gleason
