= Tachymenis ocellata =

Conservation status
- Least Concern (IUCN 3.1)

Scientific classification
- Kingdom: Animalia
- Phylum: Chordata
- Class: Reptilia
- Order: Squamata
- Suborder: Serpentes
- Family: Colubridae
- Genus: Tachymenis
- Species: T. ocellata

Binomial name
- Tachymenis ocellata (A.M.C. Duméril, Bibron, & A.H.A. Dumeril, 1854)

Synonyms
- Tomodon ocellatum A.M.C. Duméril, Bibron & A.H.A. Duméril, 1854; Tomodon ocellatus A.M.C. Duméril, Bibron & A.H.A. Duméril, 1854

Species of snake

Tachymenis ocellata, also known commonly as the ocellated pampas snake and la falsa yarará in South American Spanish, is a species of venomous snake in the subfamily Dipsadinae of the family Colubridae. The species is native to eastern-central South America.

== Geographic distribution ==
Tachymenis ocellata is found in Argentina, Brazil, Paraguay, Peru, and Uruguay.

== Habitat ==
The preferred natural habitat of Tachymenis ocellata is grassland.

== Behavior ==
Tachymenis ocellata is terrestrial.

== Diet ==
Tachymenis ocellata preys upon slugs.

== Reproduction ==
The mode of reproduction of Tachymenis ocellata has been described as viviparous and as ovoviviparous.
