= Jardin botanique de la Bastide =

Botanical garden in Bordeaux, Gironde, Aquitaine, France

Coordinates: 44.8460°N 0.5623°W

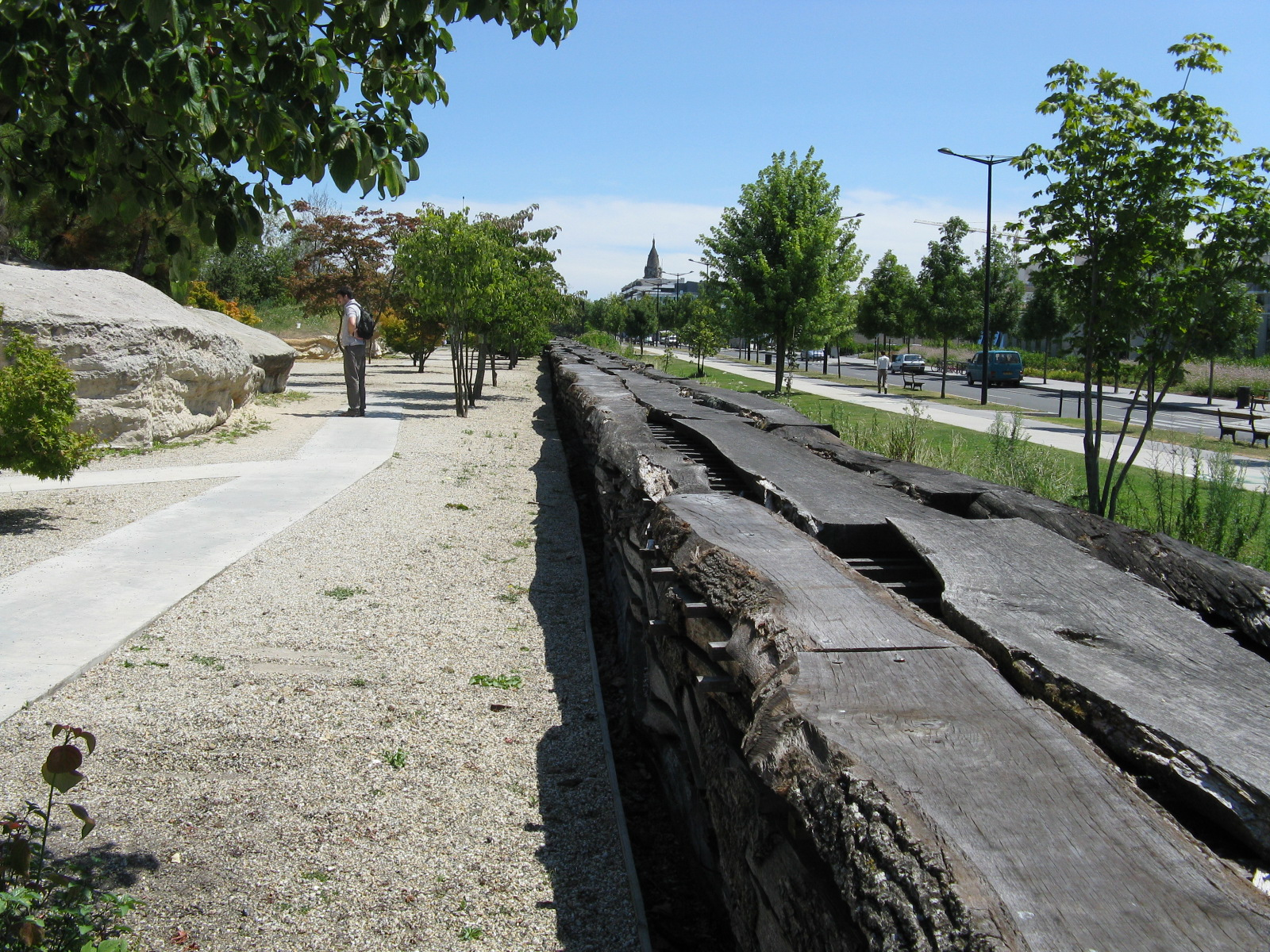
Jardin botanique de la Bastide

The Jardin botanique de la Bastide (4 hectares) is the new municipal botanical garden located on the right bank of the Garonne, along the Allée Jean Giono in Bordeaux, Gironde, Aquitaine, France.

It is open daily without charge. This garden is an offshoot of the older Jardin botanique de Bordeaux, located across the river.

The garden opened in 2003 and is organized into six sections, including an arboretum, fields of grain, an alley of vines, and a water garden (1,250 m²). It also contains greenhouses, as well as eleven landscapes representing the environments of Aquitaine, including dune, cliff, wet grassland, moorland, etc.

== Gallery ==
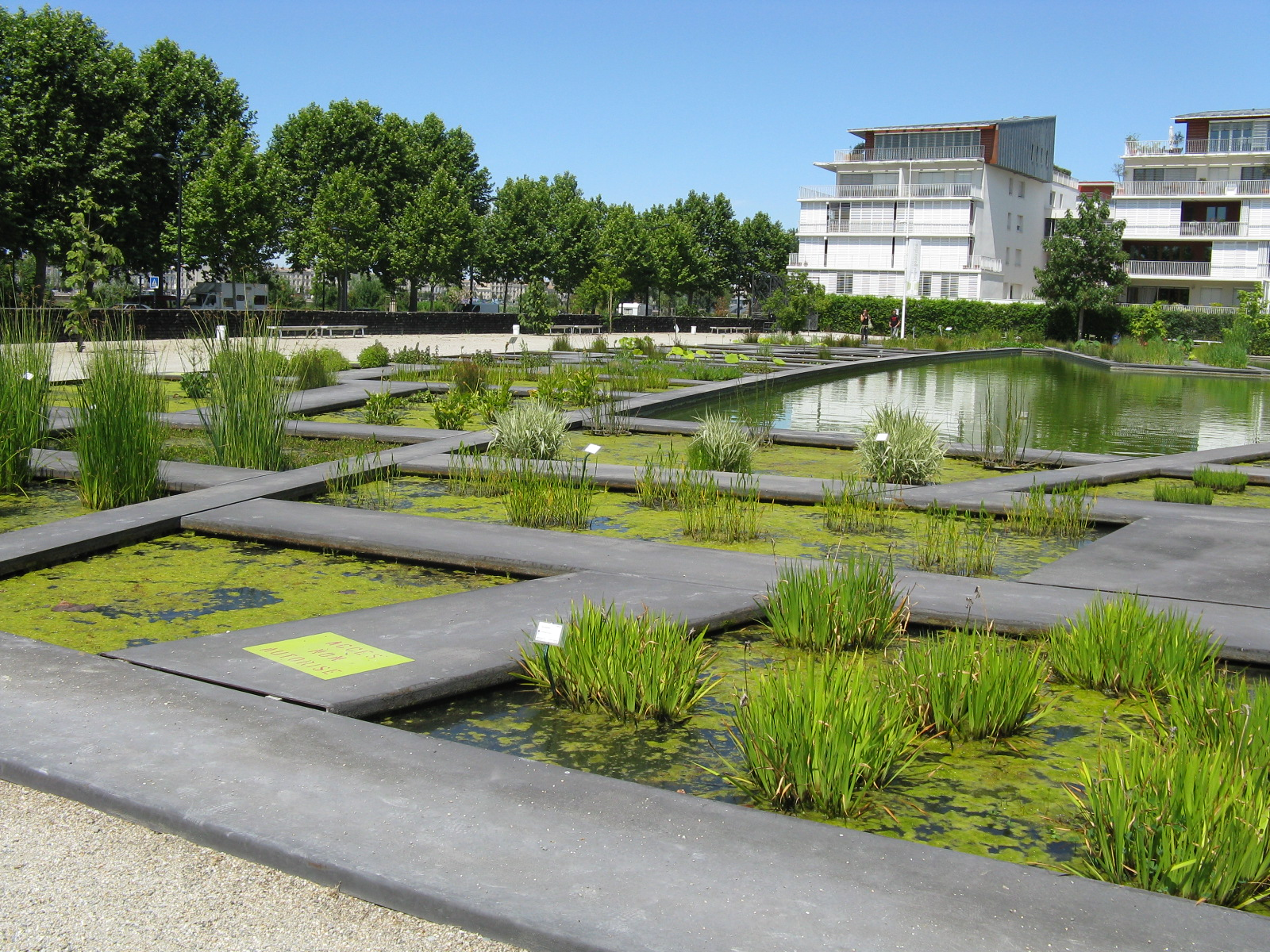

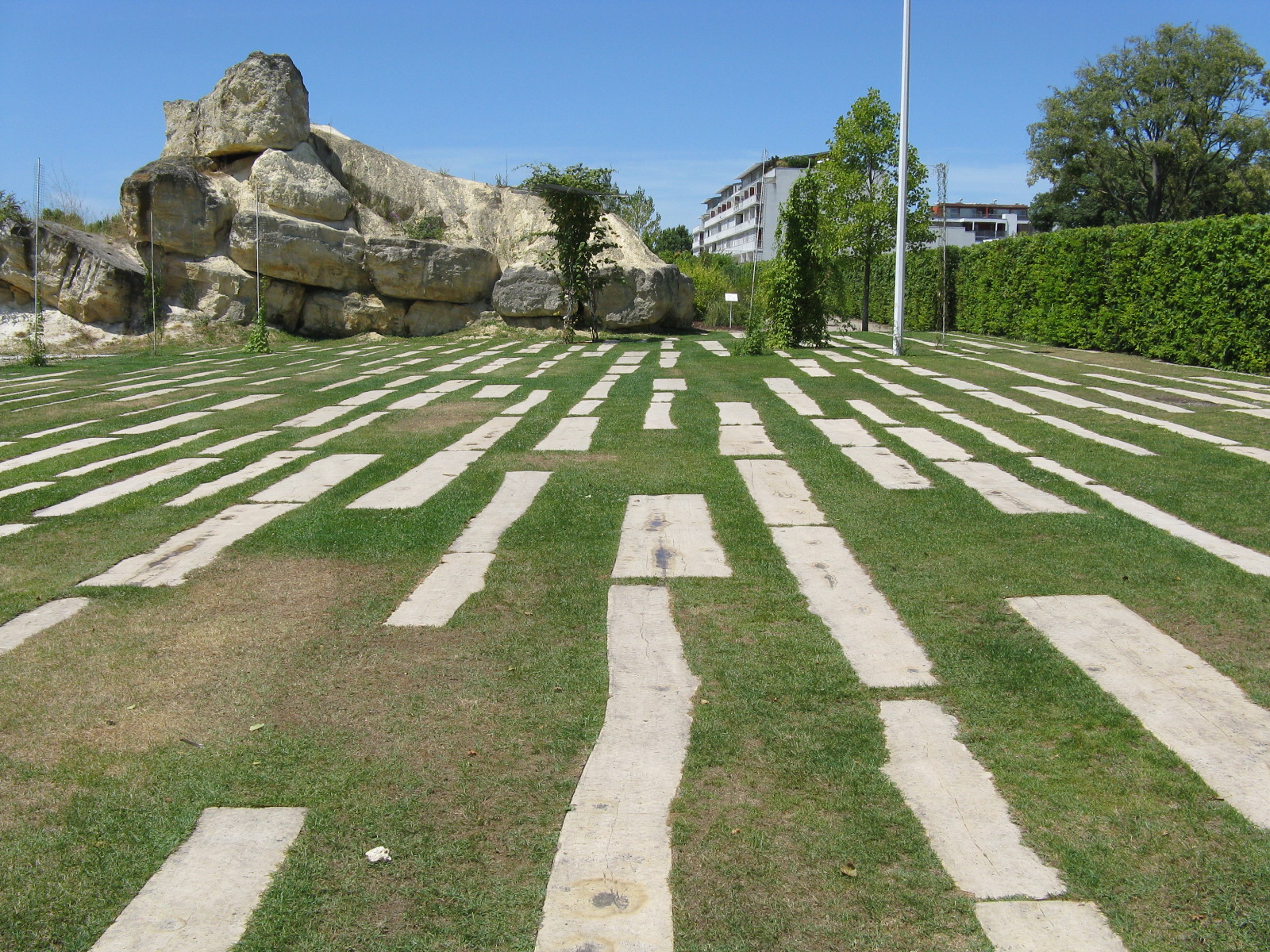

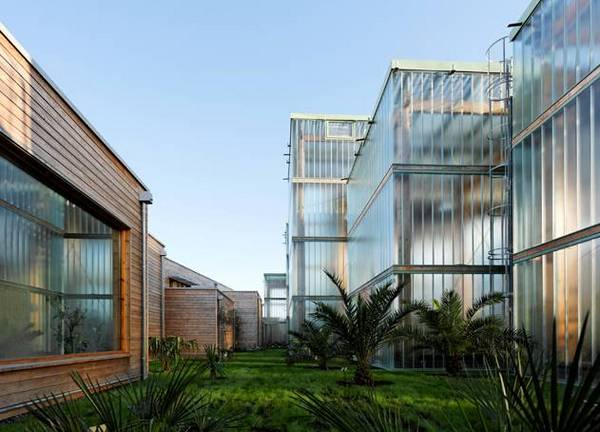
greenhouse

== See also ==
- Jardin botanique de Bordeaux
- List of botanical gardens in France
