= Michel Charles Durieu de Maisonneuve =

French soldier and botanist (1796–1878)

Michel Charles Durieu de Maisonneuve (7 December 1796 – 20 February 1878) was a French soldier and botanist who was a native of Saint-Eutrope-de-Born in the department of Lot-et-Garonne.

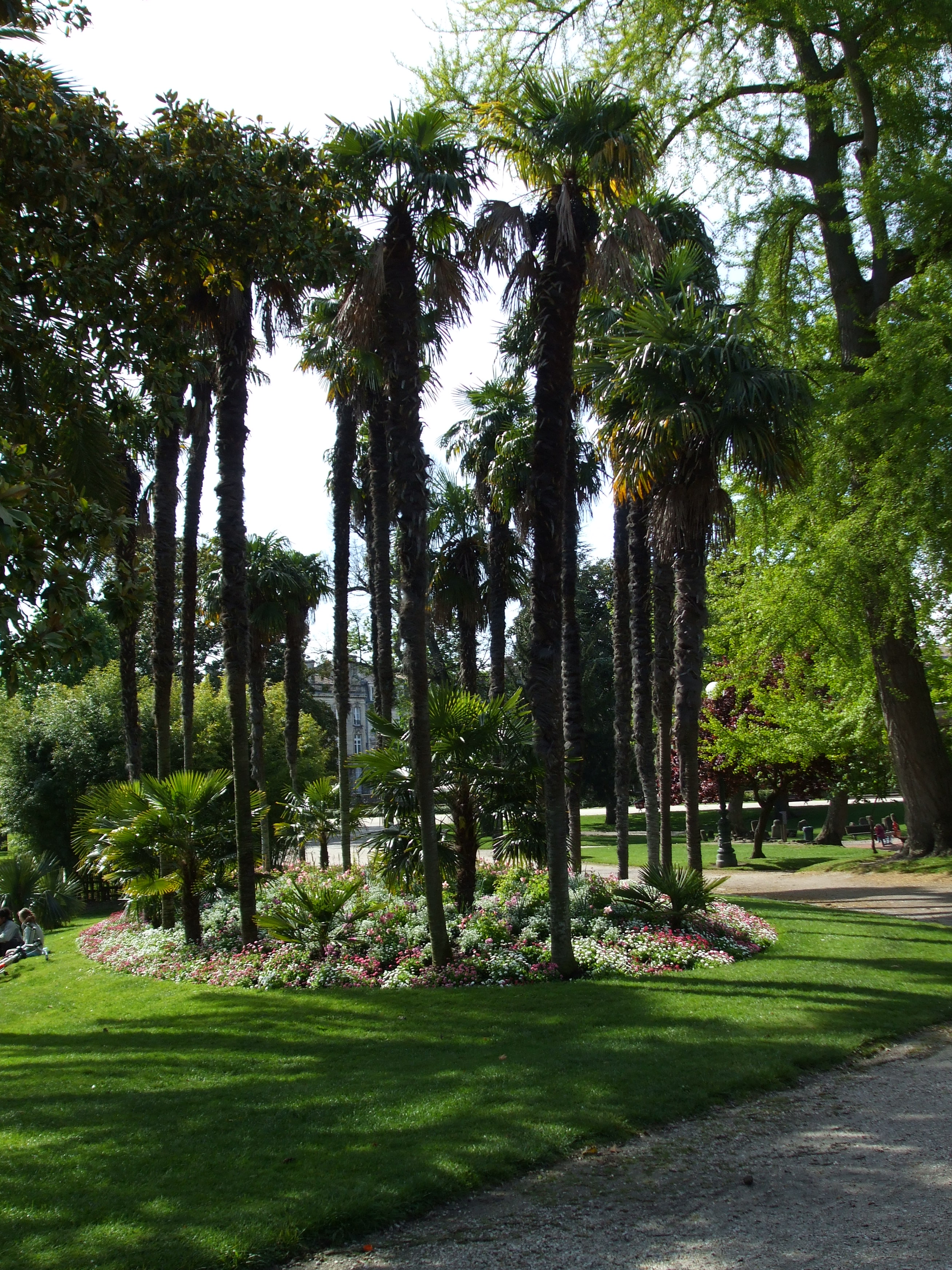
Chinese windmill palm of the Jardin botanique de Bordeaux

He studied at École Militaire de Brienne, and later at the military school of Saint-Cyr, where he received the rank of sub-lieutenant. He entered military service in 1813, and would be associated with the French army until 1848. He participated in the Battle of Trocadero at Cádiz, and was involved in the 1843 Battle of Smala against the forces of Abd-El-Kader (1808–1883).

In the mid-1820s, Durieu de Maisonneuve developed an interest in natural history and botany by studying fresh water algae. He participated in the Morea expedition to Greece with naturalist Jean Baptiste Bory de Saint-Vincent (1778–1846), and in 1840–1844 was a member of a committee for scientific exploration of Algeria. During his years in the military he also performed botanical investigations in France, Spain (Asturias) and northern Portugal. In 1856, he edited and published the exsiccata work Plantae selectae Hispano-Lusitanicae. Sectio I. Asturicae. Anno 1835 collectae distributing numbered sets of herbarium specimens.

Durieu de Maisonneuve studied cryptogam species with Bory de Saint-Vincent, Camille Montagne (1784–1866), Joseph-Henri Léveillé (1796–1870), and the brothers Charles (1817–1884) and Louis René Tulasne (1815–1885). He was particularly interested in quillworts, of which he described several new species. He also performed research of spermatophytes with Ernest Cosson (1819–1889), who was an authority on North African flora.

In 1858, he succeeded Jean François Laterrade (1784–1858) as director of the botanical garden at Bordeaux, where he was the first to acclimatize the Chinese windmill palm in France, and from 1867 to 1877, was a professor of botany in Bordeaux.

The botanical genus Durieua was named after him by Pierre Edmond Boissier and Georges François Reuter.

== Selected works ==
- Exploration Scientifique de l'Algerie, 2 volumes; (plus atlas), 1846-1855.
  - Bory de St Vincent, J.B.G.M.; Durieu de Maisonneuve, M.C. 1849. Atlas de la Flore d‘Algérie ou Illustrations d‘un Grand Nombre de Plantes Nouvelles ou Rares de ce Pays. Botanique. 39 pp., 90 illustrations. París; Impr. Nationale
- Plantae Selectae Hispano-Lusitanicae, Section I. 1856.
