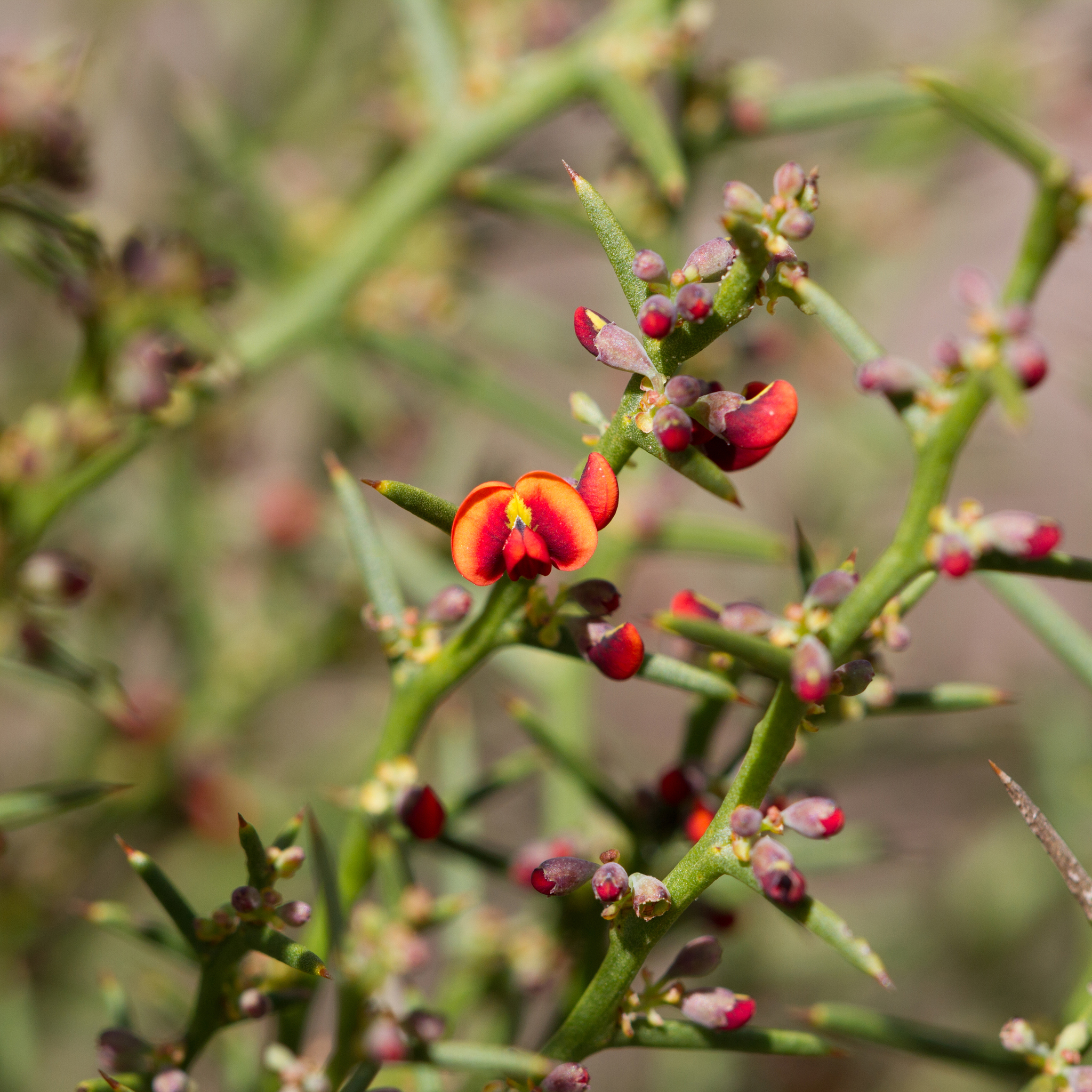
- In Monarto Conservation Park

Scientific classification
- Kingdom: Plantae
- Clade: Tracheophytes
- Clade: Angiosperms
- Clade: Eudicots
- Clade: Rosids
- Order: Fabales
- Family: Fabaceae
- Subfamily: Faboideae
- Genus: Daviesia
- Species: D. devito

Binomial name
- Daviesia devito Crisp & L.G.Cook

= Daviesia devito =

Species of flowering plant

Daviesia devito is a species of flowering plant in the family Fabaceae, endemic to south-eastern continental Australia. It is a dense, prickly shrub with sharply-pointed phyllodes and yellow, red, greenish and maroon flowers. It was previously known as Daviesia benthamii subsp. humilis until that subspecies was split into two new species.

== Description ==
Daviesia devito is a dense shrub that typically grows to a height of 0.3–1 m (1 ft 0 in – 3 ft 3 in) and has glabrous foliage. Its leaves are reduced to sharply-pointed, cylindrical phyllodes 5–30 mm (0.20–1.18 in) long and 1.0–1.75 mm (0.039–0.069 in) wide at the base. The flowers are arranged in one or two groups of two to five in leaf axils on a peduncle up to 1 mm (0.039 in) long, the rachis 2–7 mm (0.079–0.276 in) long, each flower on a pedicel up to about 1 mm (0.039 in) long with a down-curved bract at the base. The sepals are about 2 mm (0.079 in) long and joined at the base. The standard is yellow to red with a yellowish green centre, 5–6 mm (0.20–0.24 in) long and about 5 mm (0.20 in) wide, the wings orange-brown, 4.0–4.5 mm (0.16–0.18 in) long and the keel deep maroon and about 4 mm (0.16 in) long. Flowering occurs in September and October and the fruit is a broadly egg-shaped to triangular pod 5–7 mm (0.20–0.28 in) long.

== Taxonomy and naming ==
Daviesia devito is in a genus commonly known as bitter-peas. In 1982, Michael Crisp described Daviesia benthamii subsp. humilis in the Journal of the Adelaide Botanic Gardens, but in 2017 Crisp and Lyn G. Cook, in an article published in Phytotaxa, divided that subspecies into two new species, Daviesia schwarzenegger and D. devito. The specific epithets (devito and schwarzenegger) are references to the main actors in the Universal Studios 1988 film Twins, D. devito being the less vigorous of the two.

== Distribution and habitat ==
Daviesia devito usually grows in mallee, sometimes woodland or heathland and is found in scattered populations from the Eyre Peninsula in South Australia to western Victoria and to near Condobolin in New South Wales.
