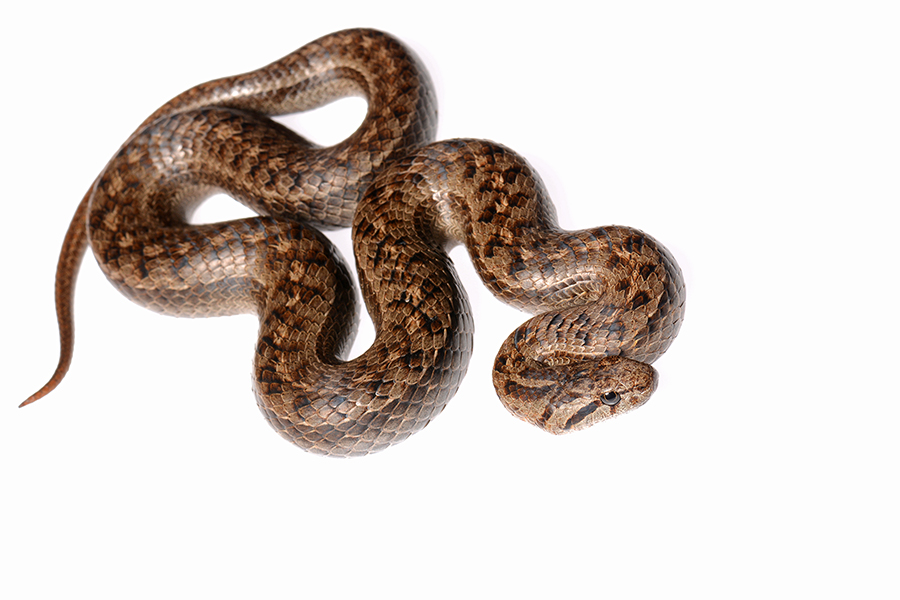

Conservation status
- Least Concern (IUCN 3.1)

Scientific classification
- Kingdom: Animalia
- Phylum: Chordata
- Class: Reptilia
- Order: Squamata
- Suborder: Serpentes
- Family: Colubridae
- Genus: Tachymenis
- Species: T. peruviana

Binomial name
- Tachymenis peruviana Wiegmann, 1835

Synonyms
- Psammophylax assimilis Jan, 1863; Leimadophis andicolus Barbour, 1915

= Tachymenis peruviana =

Species of snake

Tachymenis peruviana, also known commonly as the Peru slender snake, is a species of venomous snake in the subfamily Dipsadinae of the family Colubridae. The species is native to South America.

== Geographic distribution ==
Tachymenis peruviana is found in Argentina, Bolivia, Chile, and Peru.

== Habitat ==
Tachymenis peruviana is found in a variety of natural and artificial habitats, including forest, shrubland, grassland, pasture, cultivated lands, villages and cities, at elevations of 900–4,580 m (2,950–15,030 ft).

== Behavior ==
Tachymenis peruviana is terrestrial.

== Diet ==
Tachymenis peruviana preys predominately upon frogs and lizards.

== Reproduction ==
Tachymenis peruviana is ovoviviparous.

== Venom ==
Tachymenis peruviana possesses a powerful venom which is capable of causing serious damage or death to humans.
