= Jardin botanique de Bordeaux =

Botanical garden in Bordeaux, Gironde, Aquitaine, France

Coordinates: 44.849334°N 0.579462°W

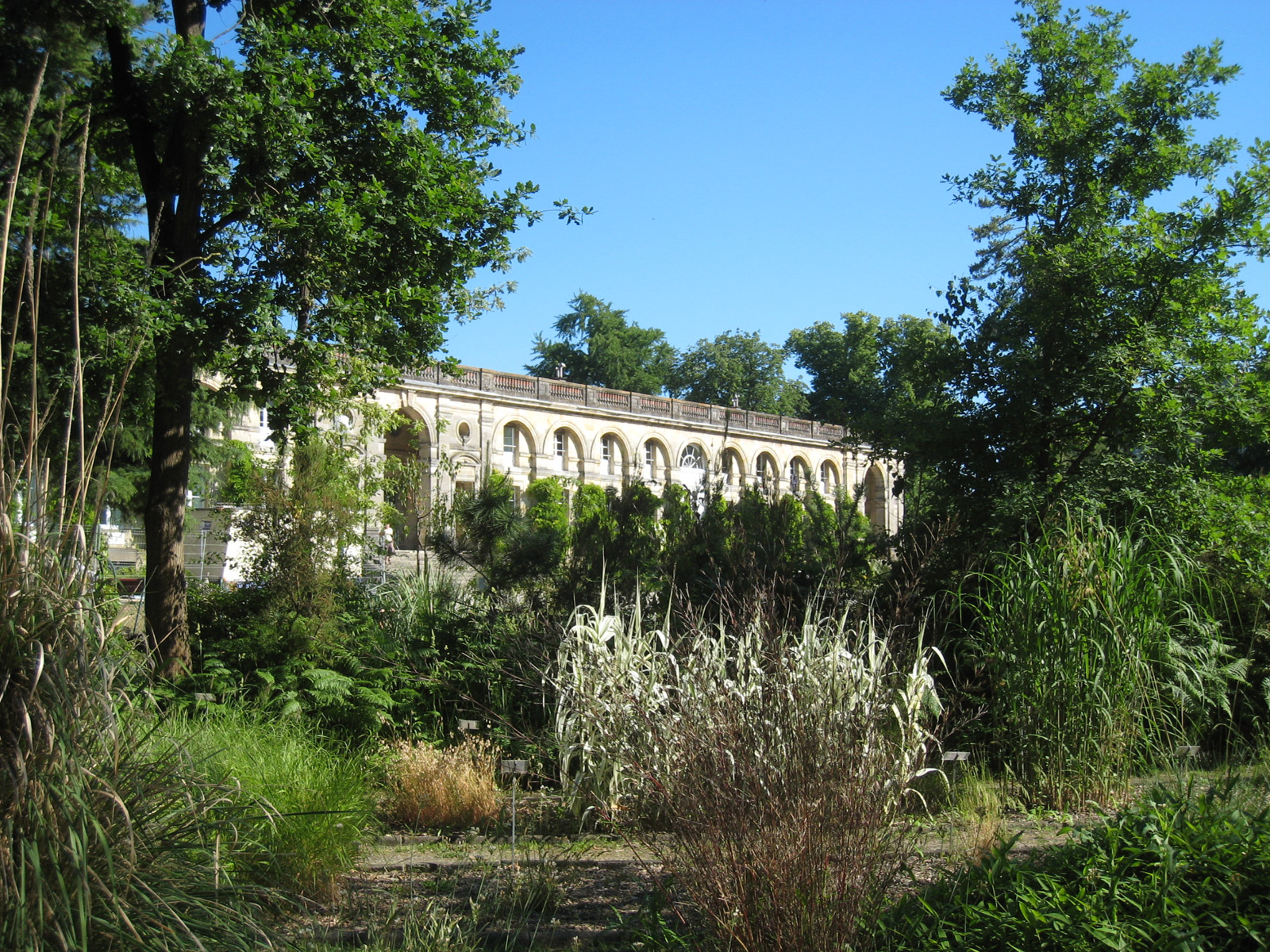
Former botanical garden de Bordeaux

The Jardin botanique de Bordeaux (0.5 hectares) is the historical municipal botanical garden, located inside the Jardin public" (Public garden), at Place Bardineau, Bordeaux, Gironde, Aquitaine, France.

It is open daily without charge. This old garden has been recently supplemented by the modern Jardin botanique de la Bastide, located across the river.

Although the garden's origins extend back to 1629 AD, with the creation of Bordeaux's first medicinal garden, today's botanical garden dates to 1858. It currently contains more than 3000 plant species, both those indigenous to Aquitaine and exotic plants from North America, China and Japan. It is organized as a systematic collection. The garden's seed collection contains 2,000 taxa, and its herbarium contains about 85,000 specimens.

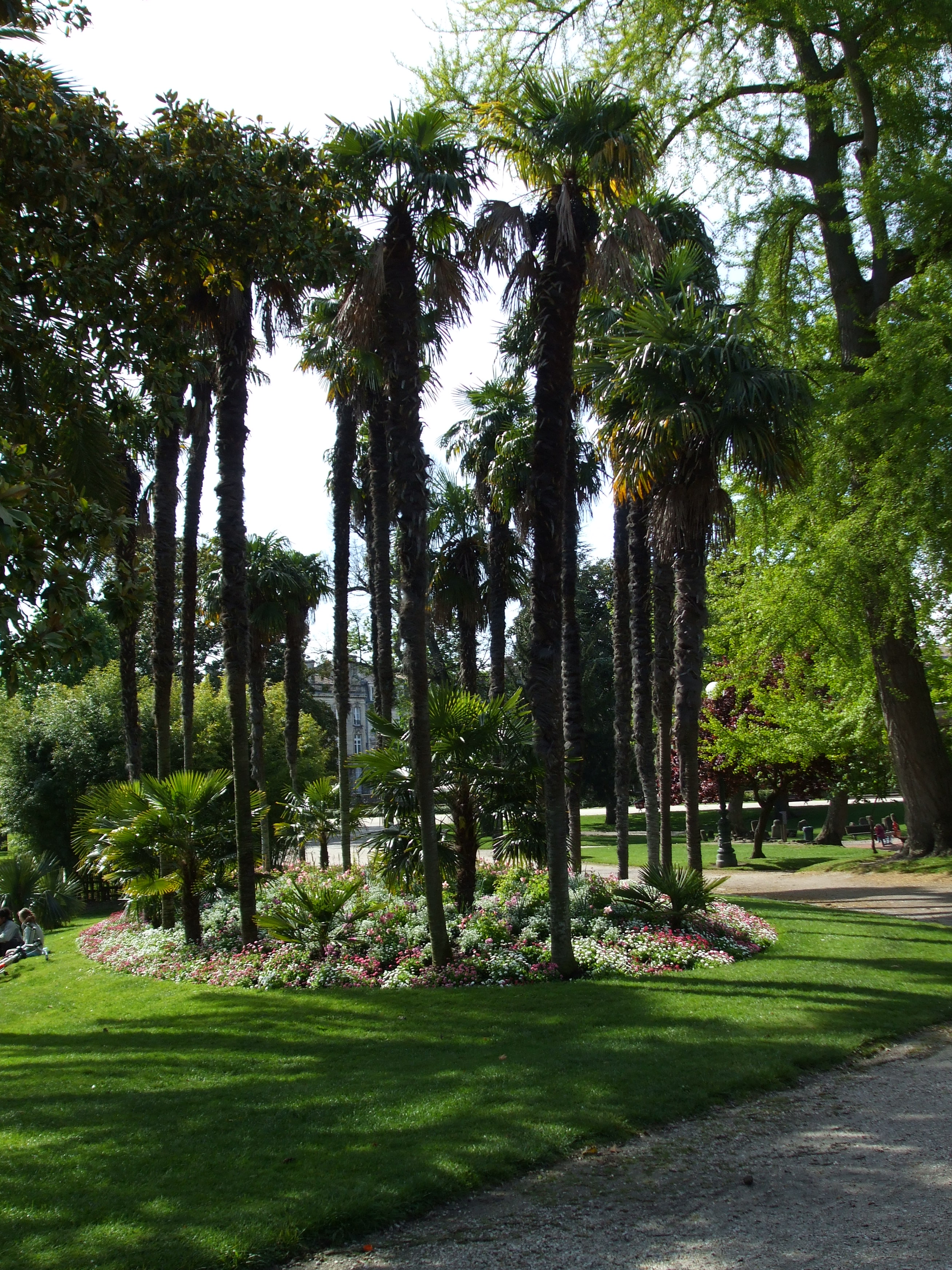
First Chinese windmill palm planting in France by Michel Durieu de Maisonneuve

== See also ==
- Jardin botanique de la Bastide
- List of botanical gardens in France
