= Johann Andreas Kneucker =

German botanist

Johann Andreas Kneucker (24 January 1862 – 22 December 1946) was a German botanical collector who was a native of Wenkheim, a village that today is part of the community of Werbach, Baden-Württemberg.

Up until 1923 he was a schoolteacher in Karlsruhe, afterwards working as curator of the natural history collection in Baden. During his career he collected plants in southern Europe and northern Africa (Sinai Peninsula).

Kneucker specialized in the plant family Cyperaceae (sedges). He edited and distributed several exsiccatae, among others Glumaceae exsiccatae: Carices exsiccatae (1896–1911) and Glumaceae exsiccatae: Gramineae exsiccatae (1900–1915). A number of his specimens are now kept in the herbarium at the Staatliches Museum für Naturkunde in Karlsruhe. He was founder of the botanical magazine, Allgemeine Botanische Zeitschrift.

In 1905 the algae genus Kneuckeria was named in his honor by Wilhelm Schmidle (1860–1951); the plant species Linaria kneuckeri (Bornm.) is also named after him.

== Publications ==
- Bemerkungen zu den "Gramineae exsiccatae" (1900).
