= Anneleen Kool =

Botanist

- Born: Anneleen Kool; Den Helder
- Education: Uppsala University
- Scientific career
- Fields: Botany
- Workplaces: University of Wageningen; Uppsala University; University of Oslo
- Thesis: Desert plants and deserted islands: Systematics and ethnobotany in Caryophyllaceae (2012)
- Doctoral advisor: Mats Thulin

Anneleen Kool is a botanist who works as the head of the botanical garden at the Natural History Museum at the University of Oslo.

== Research focus ==
Kool is known for her studies on the ethnobotany of the Nordic countries to identify human-plant interactions and local ecological knowledge that contributes to plant diversity in cultural and natural environments. She led the establishment of the thematic Viking Gardens, where the yearly Viking Garden Day event is hosted in the botanical gardens of the Natural History Museum at the University of Oslo.

== Awards ==
Kool was the recipient of Uppsala University’s Distinguished Teaching Award in 2007.
