= John Ongayo Kokwaro =

Kenya Botanist

- Born: 1940
- Died: December 13, 2019 (aged 78–79); Nairobi
- Occupations: Botanist; Academics

Academic background
- Education: Addis Ababa University; University of Uppsala

Academic work
- Discipline: Botany
- Sub-discipline: Systematic Botany
- Institutions: University of Nairobi

Kokwaro (1940 - 13 December 2019) was a Kenyan professor of botany and a member of Kenyan National Academy of Sciences.

== Early life and education ==
Kokwaro hailed from Gem, Siyian District and he was born in 1940. He obtained his elementary education from Kisumu and Bungoma Missionary College in Uganda. He obtained his first degree in Agriculture at University of Addis Ababa located in Ethiopia. In 1966, he got a postgraduate scholarship from Swedish government and later joined the Uppsala University where he researched on systematic botany in his M.Sc. and Doctorate.

== Academic career ==
Kokwaro started his career as a botanist with in August 1968 at the University of Nairobi. He rose from Tutorial Fellow, Lecturer, Senior Lecturer, Associate Professor and to a full professor. He retired from teaching in normal academic teaching on 30 June 2001 and worked as a contracted professor till June 2019

== Notable publications ==
Kokwaro notable publications are;

- Classification of East African Crops. Second Edition
- Flora of Tropical East Africa: Geraniaceae
