= Konrad Lakowitz =

German botanist

Konrad Lakowitz (22 June 1859 in Danzig – 20 August 1945 in Berlin) was a German botanist who specialized in phycological research of the Baltic region.

He studied natural sciences, geography and mathematics at the University of Breslau, where he served as an assistant to Heinrich Göppert in its botanical garden. In 1881 he obtained his PhD, and two years later became a probationary teacher in Breslau. From 1886 onward, he worked as a gymnasium teacher in Danzig, attaining the title of professor in 1907. For 25 years he was director of the Westpreußischen Botanisch-Zoologischen Verein (West Prussian Botanical-Zoological Association). In 1918 he became a member of the Deutsche Akademie der Naturforscher Leopoldina (botany section).

== Selected works ==
- Katalog der Bibliothek der Naturforschenden Gesellschaft in Danzig, since 1904 – Catalogue of the Library of the Natural Science Society in Danzig.
- Die algenflora der Danziger bucht. Ein beitrag zur kenntnis der Ostseeflora, 1907 – Algal flora of Danzig Bay. A contribution to the knowledge of Baltic Sea flora.
- Die Pilze der Umgegend von Danzig, 1920 – Fungi in the vicinity of Danzig.
- Die Algenflora der gesamten Ostsee (ausschl. Diatomeen), 1929 – Algal flora of the entire Baltic (excluding diatoms).
- Der Schloßgarten in Oliva, 1929 – The castle garden in Oliva.
- Seltene Bäume in und um Danzig, 1929 – Rare trees in and around Danzig.
