= Friedrich Ernst Leibold =

German botanist (1804-1864)

Friedrich Ernst Leibold (sometimes spelled Leybold) (9 December 1804 in Dorfgarten near Kiel – 21 July 1864 in Havana) was a German gardener and botanical collector.

Trained as a gardener, he accompanied Baron von Ludwig to the Cape of Good Hope as a botanical collector (1835–38). From 1839 to 1844, he collected specimens in Cuba and Mexico, later settling as a farmer in Texas (1847). He later took up residence in New Orleans, and died in Havana on 21 July 1864 on his way to collect specimens in the Yucatán.

He was also honoured in 1847, when botanist Diederich Franz Leonhard von Schlechtendal published a genus of flowering plants from Mexico, belonging the family Asteraceae as Leiboldia.

Plants with the specific epithet of leiboldiana are named after him, an example being Tillandsia leiboldiana.

== Associated writings ==
- "Filices a Leiboldo in Mexico lectae" by Gustav Kunze, (1844).
