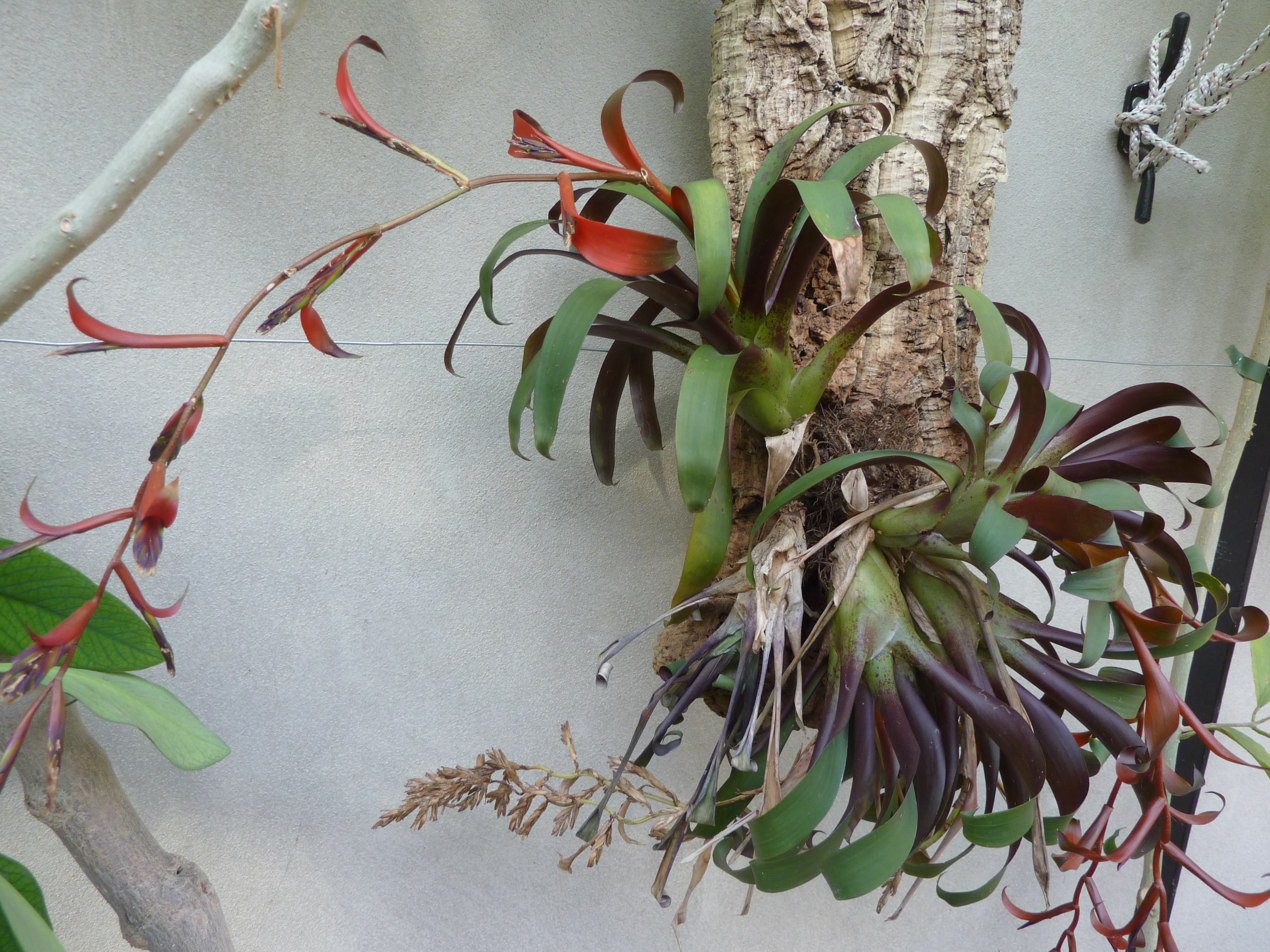

Scientific classification
- Kingdom: Plantae
- Clade: Tracheophytes
- Clade: Angiosperms
- Clade: Monocots
- Clade: Commelinids
- Order: Poales
- Family: Bromeliaceae
- Genus: Tillandsia
- Subgenus: Tillandsia subg. Tillandsia
- Species: T. leiboldiana

Binomial name
- Tillandsia leiboldiana Schltdl.

Synonyms
- Tillandsia phyllostachya Baker; Tillandsia xyphophylla Baker; Tillandsia aschersoniana Wittm.; Tillandsia rhodochlamys Baker; Tillandsia sparsiflora Baker f.; Tillandsia coccinea Sessé & Moc.; Tillandsia lilacina Mez; Vriesea siebertiana Sander ex Bois; Tillandsia leiboldiana var. guttata M.H.Hobbs

= Tillandsia leiboldiana =

Species of plant

Tillandsia leiboldiana is a species of flowering plant in the genus Tillandsia. This species is native to Central America and Mexico.

== Cultivars ==
- Tillandsia 'Chevalieri'
