= Lidiya Savich-Lyubitskaya =

Russian botanist

- Born: October 24, 1886; Daugavpils, Daugavpils apriņķis, Vitebsk Governorate, Russian Empire
- Died: September 18, 1982 (aged 95)
- Scientific career
- Fields: Botany
- Institutions: Komarov Botanical Institute
- Notable students: Ljubov Nikolaevna Vassiljeva
- Author abbrev. (botany): L.I.Savicz; Ljubitsk.

Lidiya Ivanovna Savich-Lyubitskaya or Savicz-Lubitzkaja (Russian: Лидия Ивановна Савич-Любицкая; October 24, 1886 – September 18, 1982) was a Soviet botanist, bryologist, and professor.

== Biography ==
In 1912, Savich-Lyubitskaya became an employee of the Komarov Botanical Institute under the direction of Vladimir Andreevich Tranzschel and with the assistance of Vladimir Leontyevich Komarov. She began to publish papers on bryophytes and lichens in 1914, and began to travel extensively throughout Karelia, the Kola Peninsula, the North Caucasus, Crimea, and Central Russia. During the outbreak of World War I, she began studying the prospects of using sphagnum moss for dressing wounds. As a result, it saw widespread use in hospitals. Between 1957 and 1962 she curated nineteen decades of an exsiccata series under the title Hepaticae et Musci URSS exsiccati. Edidit Institutum Botanicum nomine V. L. Komarovii Academiae Scientiarum URSS. Curavit L. I. Savicz-Ljubitzkaja. She retired in 1963.

She published her last paper allegedly when she was 90. Her book was published in 1970, when she was 84.
