= Johann Gottlob von Kurr =

German pharmacist and naturalist

Johann Gottlob von Kurr (15 January 1798, Sulzbach an der Murr – 9 May 1870, Stuttgart) was a German pharmacist and naturalist, making contributions in the fields of botany and mineralogy.

He worked for several years as a pharmacist in Calw and other communities, then later studied medicine and surgery at the University of Tübingen, where in 1832 he received doctorates for both disciplines. From 1832 to 1870 he taught classes in natural history at the vocational school in Stuttgart (in 1841 it became known as a polytechnic institute). He was a member of the Vereins für vaterländische Naturkunde in Württemberg (Association for Natural History in Württemberg), and from 1844, was curator of its geognostic-paleontological collections.

In 1828 he traveled to Norway, where he collected numerous botanical and mineralogical specimens. As a result the plant and lichen specimens were edited by the joint stock company Unio Itineraria and distributed together with material collected by J. W. P. Hübener as an exsiccata-like series under the title Unio Itineraria 1828. Later in his career, he performed investigations in the Swabian Alb with geologist Leopold von Buch and botanist Gustav Schübler. On his scientific excursions, he also journeyed to the Swiss Jura, the Alps, Mount Vesuvius and to numerous locations in Germany.

In 1842 Christian Ferdinand Friedrich Hochstetter and Ernst Gottlieb von Steudel named the plant genus Kurria in his honor.

== Published works ==
In 1858 he published the popular "Das Mineralreich in Bildern", an illustrated book of minerals that was later translated into English. The following is a list of his significant published works:

- Untersuchungen über die Bedeutung der Nektarien in den Blumen, 1833.
- Grundzüge der ökonomisch-technischen Mineralogie, 1844.
- Beiträge zur fossilen Flora der Juraformation Würrtembergs, 1846.
- Das Mineralreich in Bildern : Naturhistorisch-technische Beschreibung und Abbildung der wichtigsten Mineralien, 1858.
- The Mineral Kingdom. with coloured illustrations of the most important minerals, rocks, and petrifactions, 1859.

He also edited works by Karl Friedrich Vollrath Hoffmann, and published translations of Adrien-Henri de Jussieu ("Die Botanik", 1848) and François Sulpice Beudant ("Die Mineralogie und Geologie", 1858).
