= Lyn G. Cook =

Australian botanist and entomologist

- Alma mater: Australian National University
- Occupation: Entomologist; botanist
- Academic career
- Institutions: University of Queensland
- Author abbrev. (botany): L.G.Cook

Lynette Gai Cook is an Australian botanist and entomologist. She earned a PhD from the ANU in 2001 with a thesis entitled The biology, evolution and systematics of the Gall-inducing scale insect Apiomorpha Rübsaamen (Hemiptera: Sternorrhyncha: Coccoidea)

She is associate professor in the School of the Environment at the University of Queensland, where she has worked since 2006. Her major research focus is to "understand the origins, diversification and distributions of organisms, especially plants and insects in Australia."

She has made considerable contributions in the biogeography of plants and insects, in plant/animal co-evolution, and to the evolutionary history of other biota.

== Names published ==
- Daviesia devito Crisp & L.G.Cook
- Daviesia schwarzenegger Crisp & L.G.Cook
