= Ljubov Nikolaevna Vassiljeva =

Soviet botanist

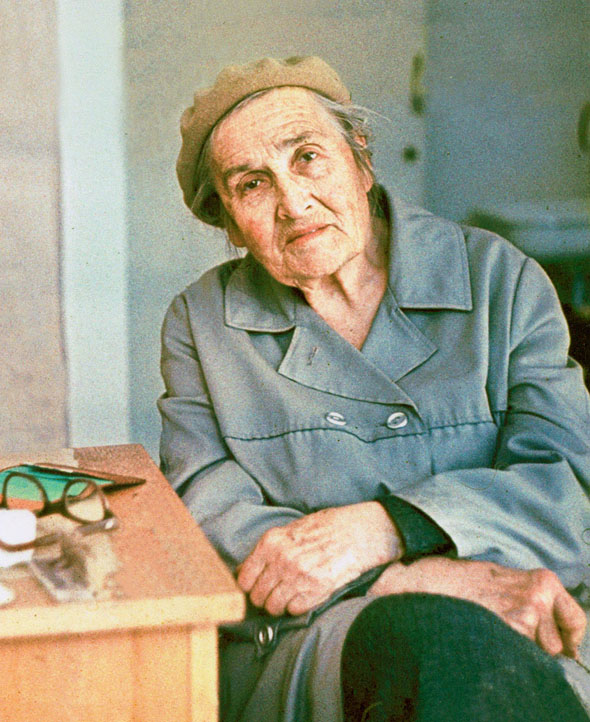
- Vassiljeva, 1970's
- Born: 6 February 1901; Saratov
- Died: 7 July 1985 (aged 84); Vladivostok
- Education: Kazan Federal University
- Scientific career
- Fields: Botany
- Workplaces: Kazan Federal University; Russian Academy of Sciences
- Author abbrev. (botany): Lj.N.Vassiljeva

Ljubov Nikolaevna Vassiljeva (Любовь Николаевна Васильева; 6 February 1901 – 7 July 1985) was a Soviet botanist, mycologist, and bryologist. The standard author abbreviation Lj.N.Vassiljeva is used to indicate this person as the author when citing a botanical name.

== Biography ==
Vassiljeva was born in Saratov on 6 February 1901. She studied under Andrey Yakovlevich Gordyagin at Kazan Federal University, graduating in 1925. She returned to graduate school, specializing in bryology under Lidija Ivanovna Savic-Ljubickaja. She taught at Kazan as an assistant professor until 1940. During World War II, she worked at the Botanical Institute of the Academy of Sciences of the USSR.

In 1944, Vassiljeva moved to the Russian Far East, becoming an employee of the Siberian Branch of the Russian Academy of Sciences. She founded her own botanical laboratory at the academy in 1949, which she headed for 17 years.

== Legacy ==
Vassiljeva has several species named in her honor, including: Hysteronaevia vassiljevae, Leucoagaricus vassiljevae, Mycoleptodonoides vassiljevae, Russula vassilievae, and Sarcoscypha vassiljevae.

== Selected publications ==
- Vassiljeva, L. N. (1973). Агариковые шляпочные грибы Приморского края [Agaric Hat Mushrooms of Primorsky Krai.] (in Russian). Leningrad. p. 329.
- Vassiljeva, L. N.; Lyubarsky, L. V. (1975). Любарский Л. В. Дереворазрушающие грибы Дальнего Востока [Wood-destroying mushrooms of the Far East] (in Russian). Novosibirsk. p. 163.
- Vassiljeva, L. N. (1978). Съедобные грибы Дальнего Востока [Edible mushrooms of the Far East] (in Russian). Vladivostok. p. 248.
