= Louis Späth =

Louis Späth (fl. 1892) was a botanist in the 19th century. He appears in the International Plant Names Index as the author of one or more botanical names. His specialism was spermatophytes.
