= Krompach =

- Municipality
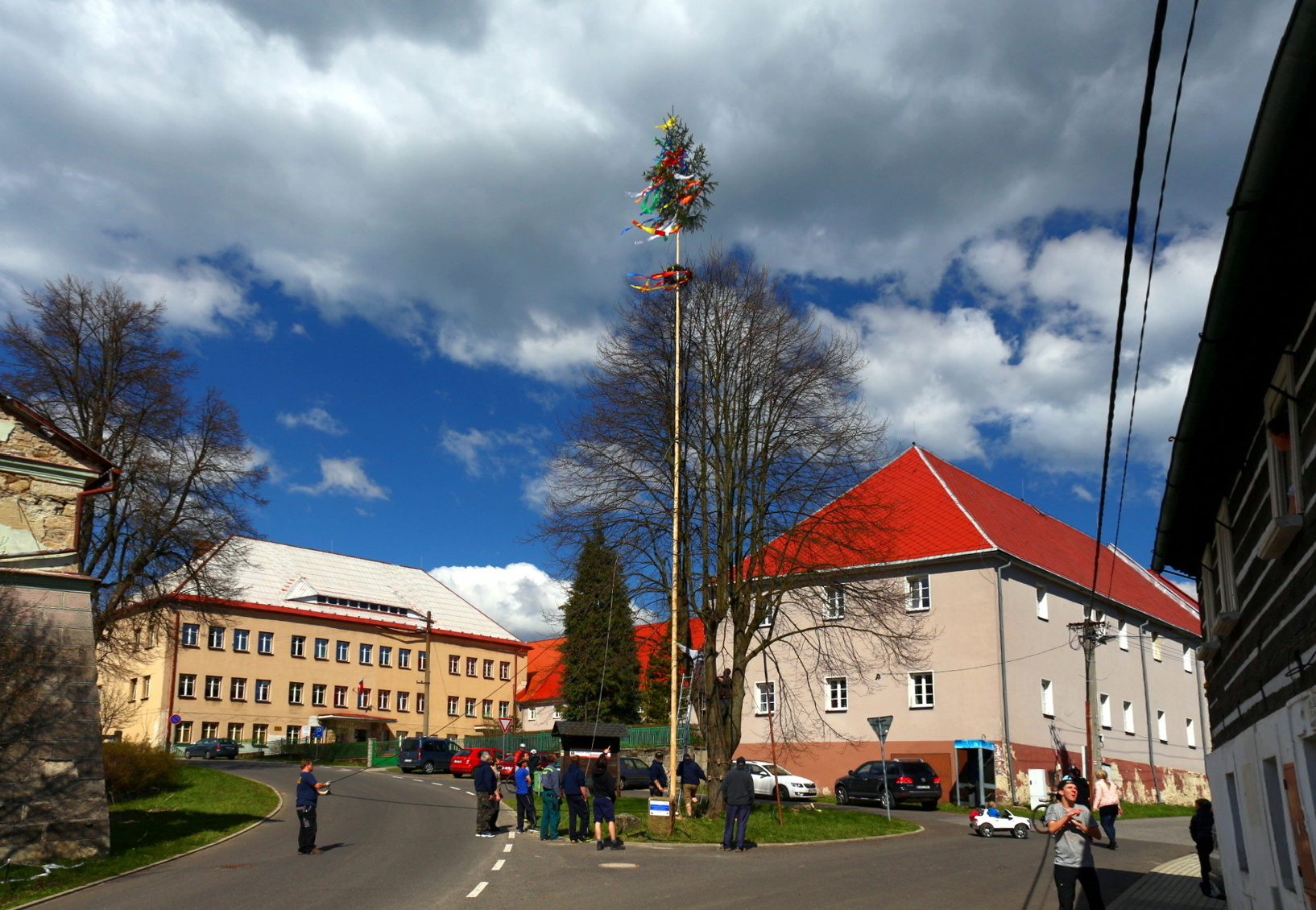
- Centre of Krompach

- Flag Coat of arms

- Location in the Czech Republic
- Coordinates: 50°49′41″N 14°42′6″E
- Country: Czech Republic
- Region: Liberec
- District: Česká Lípa
- First mentioned: 1391

Area
  - Total: 7.75 km^{2} (2.99 sq mi)
- Elevation: 476 m (1,562 ft)

Population (2026-01-01)
  - Total: 179
  - Density: 23.1/km^{2} (59.8/sq mi)
- Time zone: UTC+1 (CET)
  - Summer (DST): UTC+2 (CEST)
- Postal code: 471 57
- Website: www.obec-krompach.cz

Krompach (German: Krombach) is a municipality and village in Česká Lípa District in the Liberec Region of the Czech Republic. It has about 200 inhabitants.

== Administrative division ==
Krompach consists of three municipal parts (in brackets population according to the 2021 census):

- Krompach (160)
- Juliovka (3)
- Valy (39)

== Demographics ==
Historical population
Year	Pop.	±%
1869	1,960	—
1880	1,778	−9.3%
1890	1,682	−5.4%
1900	1,564	−7.0%
1910	1,490	−4.7%
1921	1,255	−15.8%
1930	1,265	+0.8%
1950	428	−66.2%
1961	207	−51.6%
1970	158	−23.7%
1980	160	+1.3%
1991	121	−24.4%
2001	139	+14.9%
2011	170	+22.3%
2021	202	+18.8%
Source: Censuses
