= Johann Ludwig Christian Koelle =

German physician and botanist

Johann Ludwig Christian Koelle (18 March 1763 – 30 July 1797) was a German physician and botanist born in Münchberg.

During his career he served as a "Medicinalrath" (medical counselor) and also worked as a county physician in Bayreuth. He was a member of the Regensburgische Botanische Gesellschaft (Botanical Society of Regensburg).

The plant genus Koellia (family Lamiaceae) is named in his honor.

== Publications ==
- "Spicilegium observationum de aconito", 1787.
- "Flora des Fürstenthumes Bayreuth", 1798.
