= Jean-Henri-Guillaume Krombach =

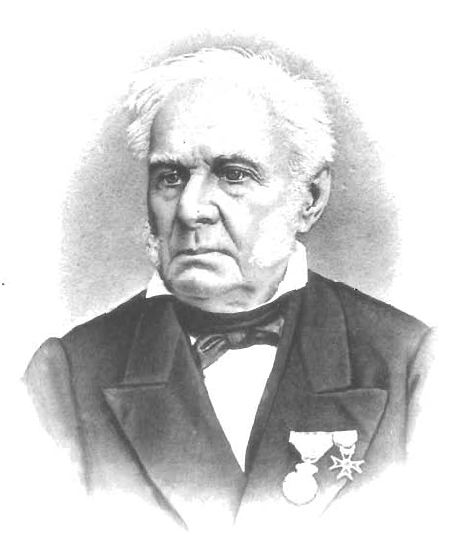
Jean-Henri-Guillaume Krombach

Jean-Henri-Guillaume Krombach, also known as Johann Heinrich Wilhelm Krombach (16 September 1791 in Moers – 23 February 1881 in Luxembourg City) was a German-Luxembourgish pharmacist and botanist.

== Career ==
He initially worked as an assistant pharmacist in a number of German cities (Soest, Mainz and Aachen), then in 1815 relocated as a pharmacist to Diekirch, Luxembourg. From 1850 he served as a pharmacist in the nearby town of Ettelbruck.

Beginning in 1830 he taught classes in natural sciences at schools in Diekirch and Ettelbruck. He was chosen to lead the Société de botanique du Grand-Duché de Luxembourg in 1871.

== Achievements ==
In 1875, he published "Flore du grand-duché de Luxembourg. Plantes phanérogames" (Flora of the Grand Duchy of Luxembourg; phanerogams). He is the taxonomic authority of the subtribe Olyrinae (family Poaceae).
