= Frédéric Kirschleger =

French physician and botanist

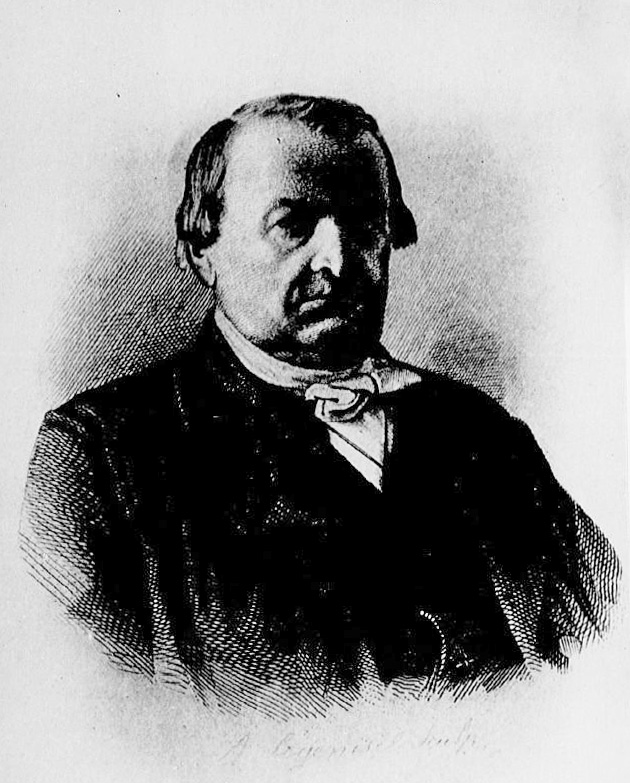
Frédéric Kirschleger (1804-1869)

Frédéric R. Kirschleger (7 January 1804 in Munster, Haut-Rhin – 15 November 1869) was a French medical doctor and botanist.

Following studies in Strasbourg, he worked as an intern of pharmacy, first in Ribeauvillé, afterwards in the dispensary at Hôpital Civil of Strasbourg. In 1827-28 he studied medicine in Paris, receiving his doctorate with a thesis on the mineral waters of Vosges. In 1829 he returned to his hometown of Munster as a doctor, resigning from this position several years later in order to become a professor of botany at the school of pharmacy in Strasbourg (1834).

In 1845 he founded the Société d'Horticulture du Bas-Rhin (Horticultural Society of Bas-Rhin), and in 1862 established the Société philomathique vogésorhénane (Philomatic Society of the Vosgés-Rhine).

Among his numerous writings is a highly regarded work on the flora of Alsace and neighboring regions, "Flore d’Alsace et des contrées limitrophes", published in three volumes from 1852 to 1862:

- Flore d'Alsace et des contrées limitrophes 1, Les plantes dicotyles pétalées, (1852).
- Flore d'Alsace et des contrées limitrophes 2, Les monochlamydées, les monocotylées, les cryptogames vasculaires, (1857).
- Flore d'Alsace et des contrées limitrophes 3, La géographie botanique des régions rhénano-vosgiennes, (1862).

In 1835 the botanical genus Kierschlegeria (family Onagraceae) was named in his honor by botanist Édouard Spach.
