= Jean François Laterrade =

Jean-François Laterrade (23 January 1784 – 30 October 1858) was a French botanist born in Bordeaux. He was a founding member of Linnean Society of Bordeaux, and was director of the botanical garden at Bordeaux.

In 1811 Laterrade published a work involving flora found in the environs of Bordeaux called "Flore bordelaise, ou Tableau des plantes qui croissent naturellement aux environs de Bordeaux". This book was re-issued in 1821, 1829 and 1846. In 1823 he founded a popular agricultural journal titled "L'Ami des champs" (The Friend of the Fields).

The mycological genus Laterradea (Raspail, 1824) is named after him.
