= Hubert Leitgeb (botanist) =

Austrian botanist (1835–1888)

Hubert Leitgeb (13 October 1835 – 5 April 1888) was an Austrian botanist born in Portendorf, a village in Carinthia.

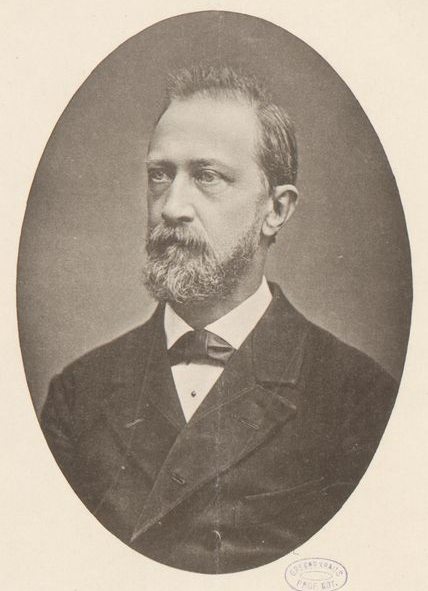
Hubert Leitgeb

He studied sciences at the University of Graz, afterwards working as a teacher of natural history at gymnasiums in Celje, Görz, Linz and Graz. In 1867 he obtained his habilitation, followed by an associate professorship at Graz during the following year. In 1869 he became a full professor at the University of Graz, where in 1873, he was appointed director of the botanical garden. In 1884/85 he served as university rector.

Known for his work in the fields of plant anatomy and morphology, he was interested in a plants' inner workings and the interaction between its different components. His wide-ranging research included studies on the embryology and developmental biology of ferns, and investigations involving the physiology of a plants' stomatal apparatus, to name a couple. Among his written efforts was a six-part treatise on liverworts, titled Untersuchungen ueber die Lebermoose.

In 1887 he became a full member of the Vienna Academy of Sciences.

== Selected writings ==
- Beiträge zur wissenschaftlichen Botanik, 1858-1868 (four volumes, with Carl Nägeli and Simon Schwendener) - Contributions to scientific botany.
- Die Luftwurzeln der Orchideen, 1864 (part of the series Akademie der Wissenschaften, Vienna. Mathematisch-naturwissenschaftliche Klasse. Denkschriften, Bd. 24, 2 Abth.) - The aerial roots of orchids.
- Untersuchungen ueber die Lebermoose, 1874-1881 (six books) - Investigations of liverworts.
- Hepaticae, 1876 - Hepaticae.
- Mittheilungen aus dem Botanischen Institut zu Graz, 1888 - Communications of the Botanical Institute at Graz.
