= Friedrich Leybold =

Friedrich Leybold (29 September 1827, Grossköllenbach (Bavaria) – 31 December 1879, Santiago de Chile) was a German-Chilean pharmacist and naturalist.

In 1855 he relocated to Chile as a pharmaceutical industrialist, eventually settling in Santiago de Chile. While in South America, he traveled the Argentine Pampas, publishing "Escursion a las pampas arjentinas : hojas de mi diario, febrero de 1871" as a result. While collecting specimens in the Juan Fernández Archipelago, he discovered the Alejandro Selkirk firecrown (Sephanoides fernandensis leyboldi), a subspecies of hummingbird endemic to Alejandro Selkirk Island. It is now classified as extinct; the last sighting of the subspecies was in 1908.

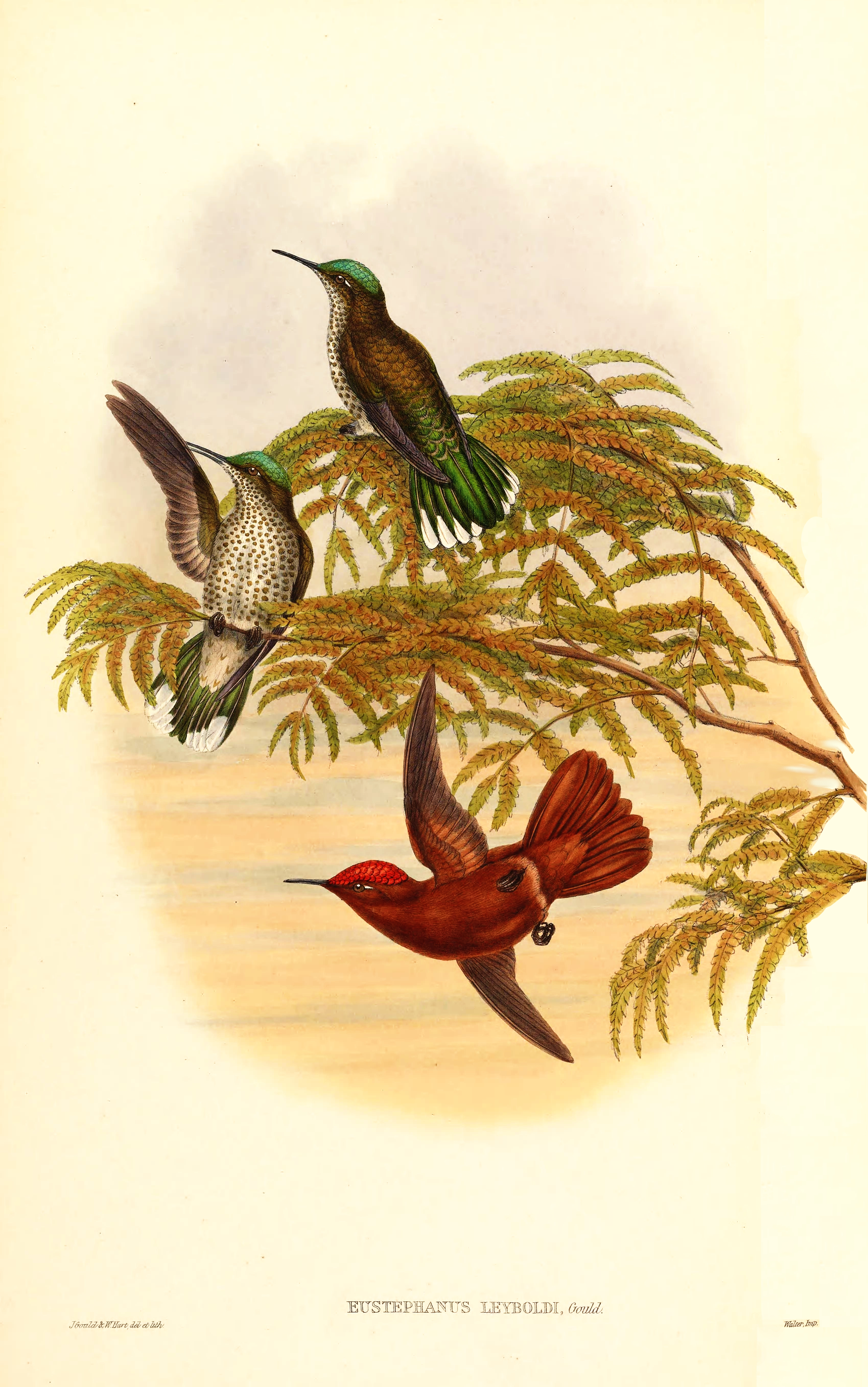
Sephanoides fernandensis leyboldi; from Gould's 'A Monograph of the Trochilidae or Family of Hummingbirds'.

He provided descriptions for a number of botanical species and is the taxonomic authority of the family Tecophilaeaceae. The hard fern species Blechnum leyboldtianum (synonym Blechnum blechnoides) is named in his honor.

He was author of a monograph on the botanical order Salicineae that became part of the "Flora Brasiliensis" series. When he was better off economically, he set off on numerous journeys to the Chilean and Argentine Cordilleras for research purposes, following his passion. These activities again brought him into severe financial difficulties. Therefore, at the beginning of the Saltpetre War, he put all his hopes in negotiations with the Chilean government. For the war between Chile, Peru and Bolivia, he wanted to supply a solid meat broth in canned goods for the army, but the negotiations and the deal fell through. This hopeless situation led Leybold to fatigue with life and finally to suicide in 1879.

Specimens collected by Leybold are cared for at the National Herbarium of Victoria (MEL), Royal Botanic Gardens Victoria.
