= Taxitheliella richardsii =

Conservation status
- Critically Endangered (IUCN 2.3)

Scientific classification
- Kingdom: Plantae
- Division: Bryophyta
- Class: Bryopsida
- Subclass: Bryidae
- Order: Hypnales
- Family: Pylaisiadelphaceae
- Genus: Taxitheliella
- Species: T. richardsii

Binomial name
- Taxitheliella richardsii Dixon

Species of moss

Taxitheliella richardsii is a species of moss in the family Pylaisiadelphaceae. It is endemic to Borneo where it is confined to Sarawak. Its natural habitat is subtropical or tropical dry forests. It is threatened by habitat loss.
