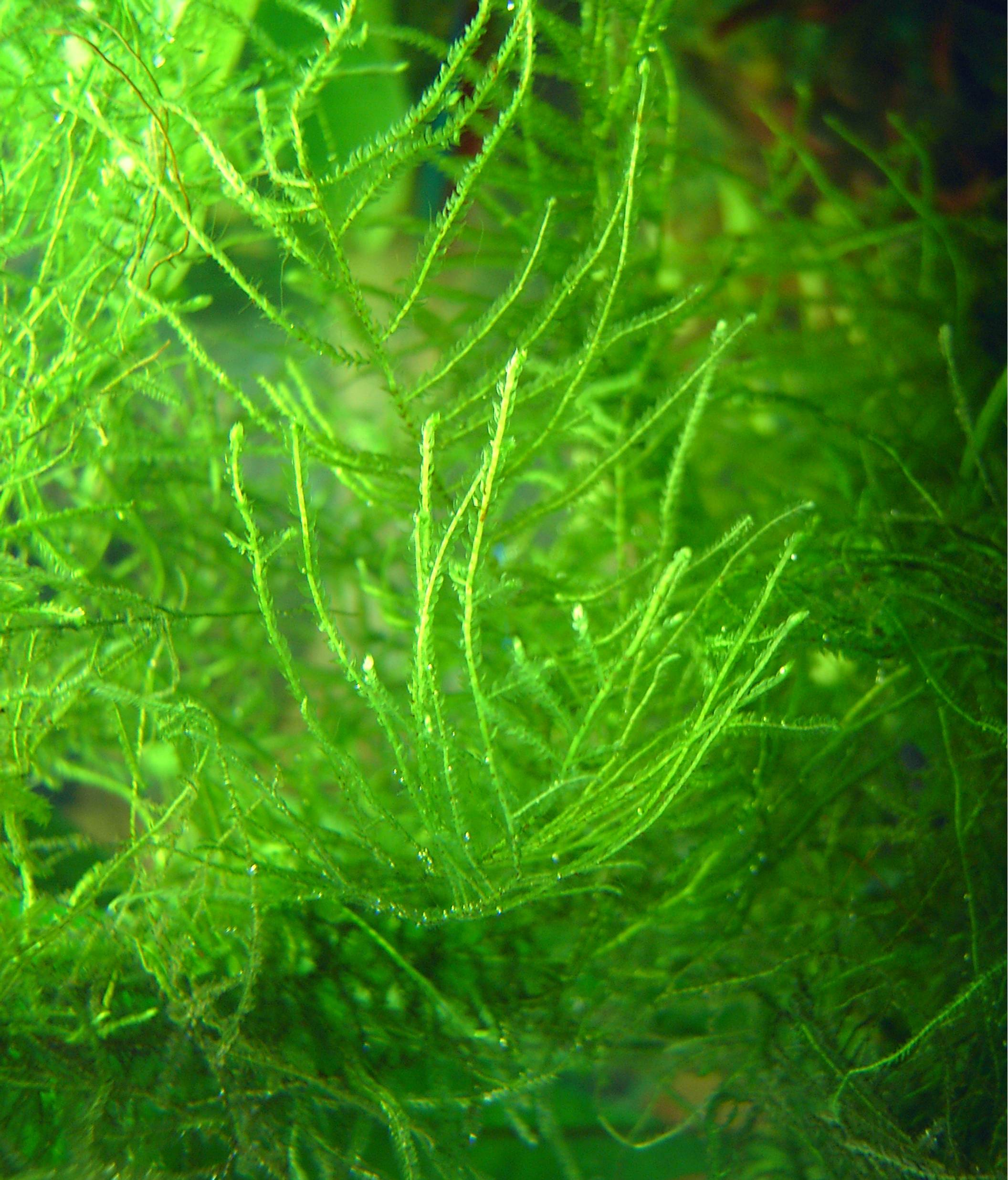

Scientific classification
- Kingdom: Plantae
- Division: Bryophyta
- Class: Bryopsida
- Subclass: Bryidae
- Order: Hypnales
- Family: Hypnaceae
- Genus: Taxiphyllum
- Species: T. barbieri

Binomial name
- Taxiphyllum barbieri (Cardot & Copp.) Z. Iwats.

= Taxiphyllum barbieri =

Java moss

Southeast Asian moss

Taxiphyllum barbieri, known as Java moss or Bogor moss, is a moss belonging to the family Hypnaceae. Native to Southeast Asia, it is commonly used in freshwater aquariums. It attaches to rocks, roots, and driftwood. In the wild, it grows in humid riparian areas.

It was originally described as Isopterygium barbieri from Vinh, Vietnam.

== Description ==
The species is dioecious and perennial. It forms loose cushions of irregularly arranged branches. Leaves are two-ranked and flat. It has only been recorded in the wild in Vietnam.

== Cultivation and uses ==
In the aquarium trade, Java moss can refer to either Taxiphyllum barbieri or Vesicularia dubyana, and it can be difficult to distinguish between the species. T. barbieri was first introduced to European aquarists in 1968, where it was initially misidentified as Glossadelphus zollingeri.

T. barbieri is one of the most common mosses in the aquarium trade. It does not require any special attention and propagates readily. It accepts all kinds of water, even weakly brackish, and light qualities. It grows best at 68 to 86 °F (20 to 30 °C) but can live in temperatures outside this range. It makes a good foreground plant. Due to its clinging nature, Java moss can be made into a moss carpet.

It is trendy among aquarists raising fry (baby fish) and tadpoles, to protect them from cannibalistic adults. Some shrimp feed on the various microorganisms and detritus that collect on the moss.

Java moss can be easily propagated via division. It is suitable for both aquatic and terrestrial cultivation in vivariums. Spore capsules are rarely formed in cultivation.

== See also ==
- Vesicularia montagnei, also known as "Christmas moss" or "Brazil moss"
