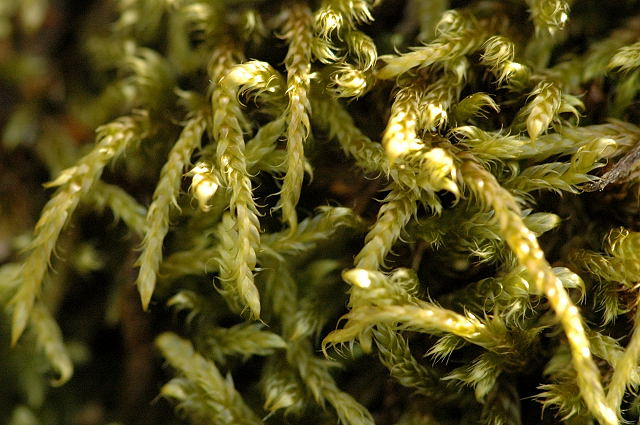

Scientific classification
- Kingdom: Plantae
- Division: Bryophyta
- Class: Bryopsida
- Subclass: Bryidae
- Order: Hypnales
- Family: Hypnaceae
- Genus: Hypnum
- Species: H. jutlandicum

Binomial name
- Hypnum jutlandicum Holmen & Warncke, 1969

= Hypnum jutlandicum =

Species of moss

Hypnum jutlandicum is a species of moss belonging to the family Hypnaceae. It is widely distributed in Europe and the Aleutian Islands but it is also found in other parts of the world.

In a study of the effect of the herbicide Asulam on moss growth, Hypnum jutlandicum was shown to have intermediate sensitivity to Asulam exposure.
