= Ctenidiadelphus =

Scientific classification
- Kingdom: Plantae
- Division: Bryophyta
- Class: Bryopsida
- Subclass: Bryidae
- Order: Hypnales
- Family: Hypnaceae
- Genus: Ctenidiadelphus; M. Fleisch
- Species: C. plumularia

Binomial name
- Ctenidiadelphus plumularia (Müll.Hal.) M.Fleisch.

Genus of mosses

Ctenidiadelphus is a monospecific genus of mosses in the family Hypnaceae described in 1923 by Max Fleischer. The only species it contains is Ctenidiadelphus plumularia.

After the type species, Herzogiella cylindricarpa, was moved to Herzogiella, Ctenidiadelphus plumularia was designated as the lectotype.
