= Podperaea baii =

Scientific classification
- Kingdom: Plantae
- Division: Bryophyta
- Class: Bryopsida
- Subclass: Bryidae
- Order: Hypnales
- Family: Hypnaceae
- Genus: Podperaea
- Species: P. baii

Binomial name
- Podperaea baii Ignatov

Synonyms
- Redfearnia baii (Ignatov) J.T. Wynns

Species of moss

Podperaea baii is a species of moss from the genus Podperaea. It was discovered (possibly found in Russia) by Mikhail Stanislavovich Ignatov in 2011. In 2020, Podperaea baii had a synonym named Redfearnia baii.
