= Podperaea krylovii =

Scientific classification
- Kingdom: Plantae
- Division: Bryophyta
- Class: Bryopsida
- Subclass: Bryidae
- Order: Hypnales
- Family: Hypnaceae
- Genus: Podperaea
- Species: P. krylovii

Binomial name
- Podperaea krylovii (Podp.) Z.Iwats. & Glime

Synonyms
- Campylium krylovii (Podp.) Lazarenko; Chrysohypnum krylovii Podp.

Species of moss

Podperaea krylovii is a species of moss in the genus Podperaea. Found in Asia, it was transferred to the genus Podperaea by Zennosuke Iwatsuki and Janice Mildred Glime.
