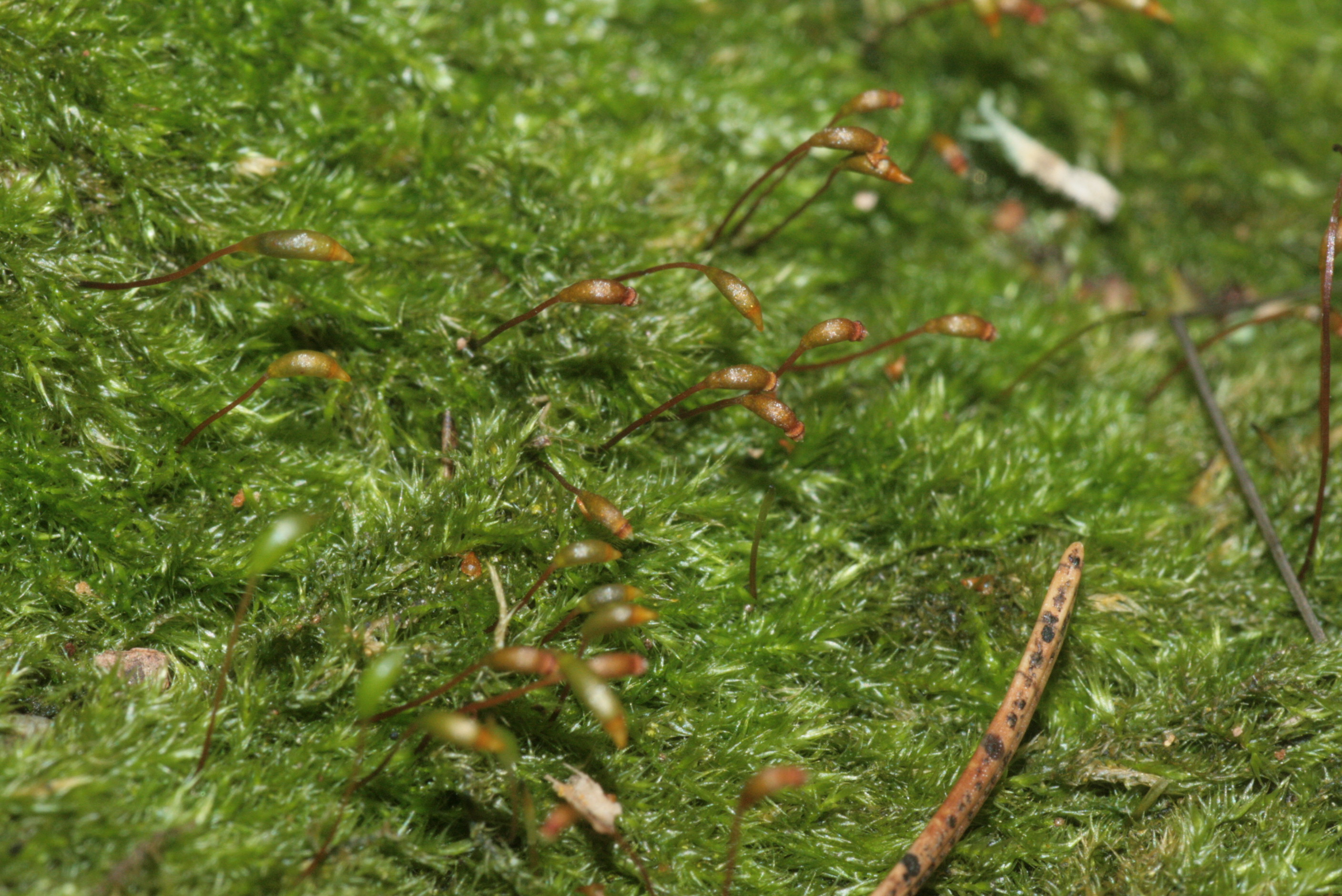

Scientific classification
- Kingdom: Plantae
- Division: Bryophyta
- Class: Bryopsida
- Subclass: Bryidae
- Order: Hypnales
- Family: Hypnaceae
- Genus: Homomallium
- Species: H. incurvatum

Binomial name
- Homomallium incurvatum Loeske, 1907

= Homomallium incurvatum =

Species of moss

Homomallium incurvatum is a species of moss belonging to the family Hypnaceae.

It is native to Eurasia and Northern America.
