= Mahua =

Mahua or Mahuaa may refer to:

== Botany ==
- Madhuca longifolia or mahua, a tree in the family Sapotaceae
- Mahua (moss), a genus of mosses in family Hypnaceae

== Culture and entertainment ==
- Mahua (snack), a Chinese fried dough twist
- Mahuli (wine) or mahua, a fruit wine of Odisha, Jharkhand, India, made from Madhuca longifolia flowers
- Mahuaa (film), a 2018 Indian Nagpuri film
- Mahuaa TV, an Indian Bhojpuri-language television channel

== Places ==
- Mahua, Bihar, in Vaishali District, Bihar, India
  - Mahua Assembly constituency, encompassing the town
- Mahua Waterfall, in Crocker Range National Park, Malaysia

== People ==
- Mahua Moitra (born 1974), Indian politician
- Mahua Mukherjee, Indian dancer and choreographer
- Mahua Roychoudhury (1958–1985), Indian actress
- Mahua Sarkar, sociologist

== See also ==
- Mahuva (disambiguation)
