= Vesicularia =

Vesicularia may refer to:

- Vesicularia (plant), a moss genus in the family Hypnaceae
- Vesicularia (bryozoan), a bryozoa genus in the family Vesiculariidae
