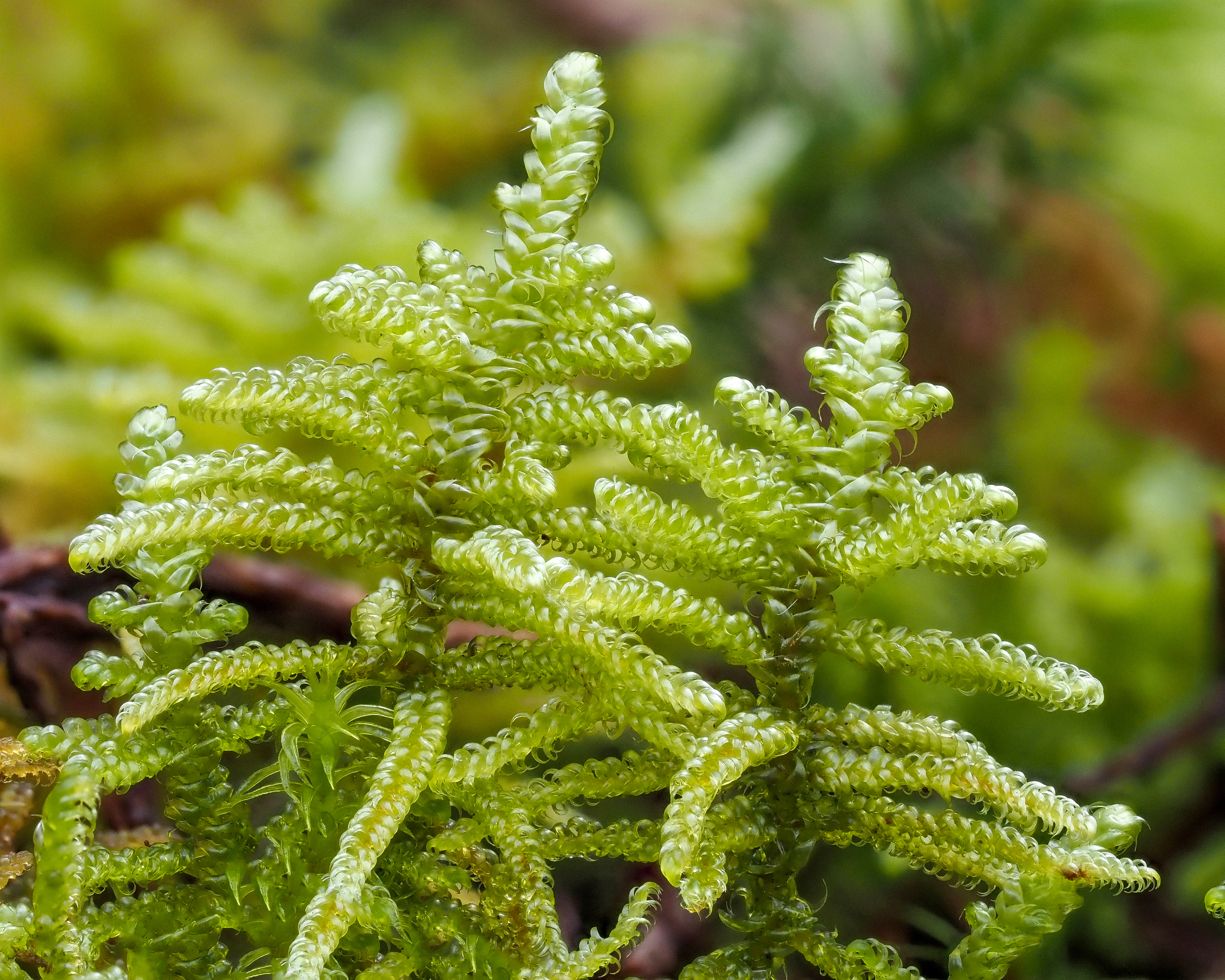
- Calohypnum macrogynum

Scientific classification
- Kingdom: Plantae
- Division: Bryophyta
- Class: Bryopsida
- Subclass: Bryidae
- Order: Hypnales
- Family: Hypnaceae
- Genus: Calohypnum; Sakurai

= Calohypnum =

Genus of mosses

Calohypnum is a genus of mosses variably placed in Hypnaceae and Pylaisiaceae. It includes seven accepted species.

In 2019, Calohypnum sakurai was designated as the taxon's lectotype.

== Subordinate Taxa ==
As reported by Tropicos:

- Calohypnum amabile
- Calohypnum macrogynum
- Calohypnum oldhamii
- Calohypnum plumiforme
- Calohypnum sakuraii
- Calohypnum sikkimense
- Calohypnum singapurense
