= Andoa =

Andoa may refer to:

- Andoa language, an extinct Zaparoan language of Peru
- Andoa (plant), a genus of moss in the family Hypnaceae
