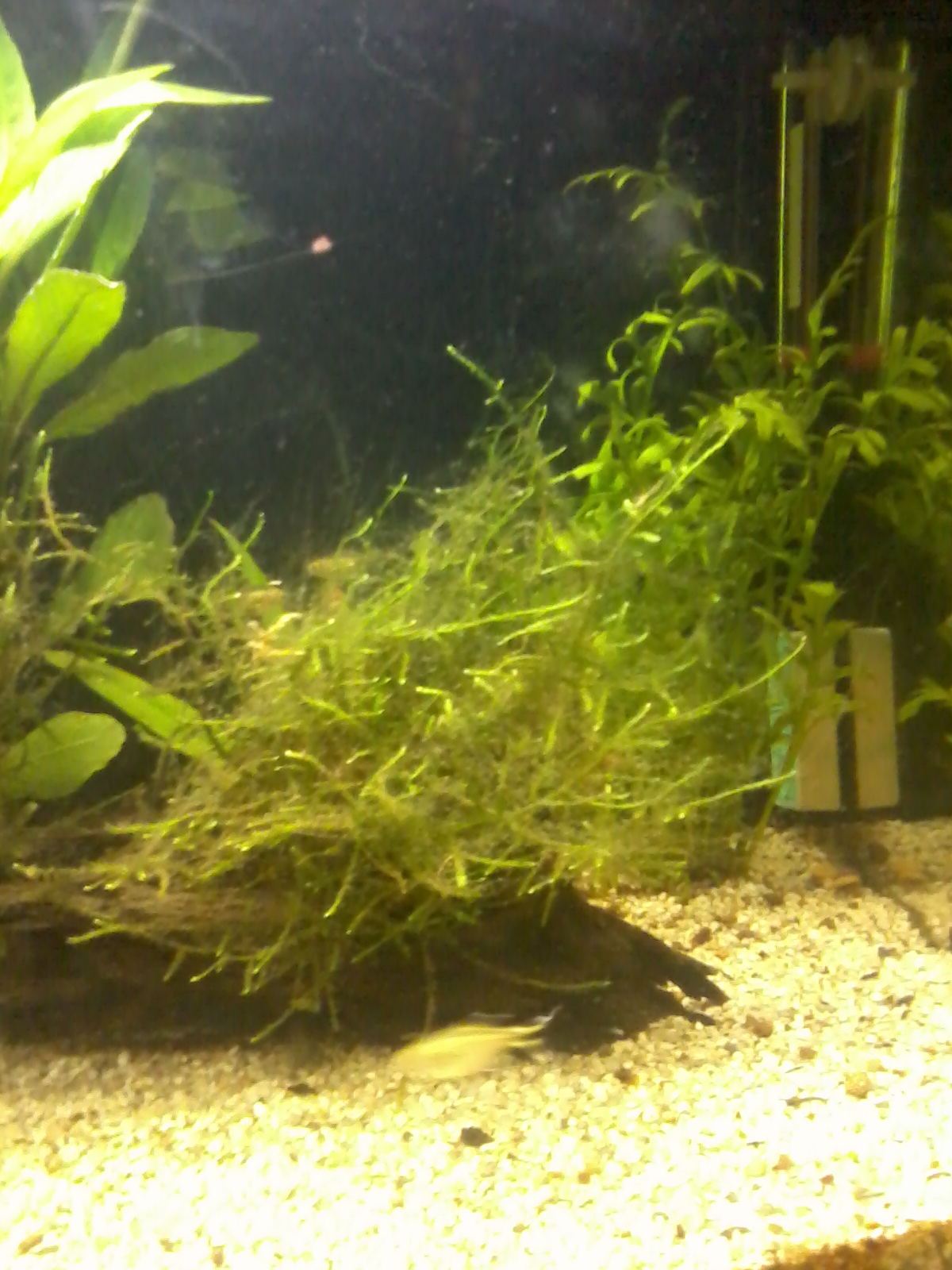

Scientific classification
- Kingdom: Plantae
- Clade: Embryophytes
- Division: Bryophyta
- Class: Bryopsida
- Subclass: Bryidae
- Order: Hypnales
- Family: Hypnaceae
- Genus: Vesicularia
- Species: V. dubyana

Binomial name
- Vesicularia dubyana Broth.

= Vesicularia dubyana =

Species of moss

Vesicularia dubyana, known as Java moss or Singapore moss, is a species of moss native to Asia. It is common in the aquarium trade.

The species was named in honor of botanist Jean Étienne Duby.

== Description ==
The species is monoecious and perennial, with an irregularly branched stem. In the wild, it is found on soils, rocks, and trunks of trees.

== Cultivation and uses ==
In the aquarium trade, Java moss can refer to either V. dubyana or Taxiphyllum barbieri, and it can be difficult to distinguish between the species. Although V. dubyana was the first species to be called 'Java moss', it has been supplanted in popularity by T. barbieri. It was first introduced to aquarists in 1933.

V. dubyana is a hardy moss when grown in cultivation, and can tolerate temperatures between 15–20 °C (59–68 °F), low light, and variable pH. It can withstand brackish conditions. It propagates and forms sporophytes readily, even when fully submersed.
