= Crepidophyllum =

Scientific classification
- Kingdom: Plantae
- Division: Bryophyta
- Class: Bryopsida
- Subclass: Bryidae
- Order: Hypnales
- Family: Hypnaceae
- Genus: Crepidophyllum; Herzog
- Species: C. modestum

Binomial name
- Crepidophyllum modestum Herzog

Genus of mosses in the family Hypnaceae

Crepidophyllum is a monospecific genus within the family Hypnaceae described by Theodor Herzog. The only accepted species placed within it is Crepidophyllum modestum.
