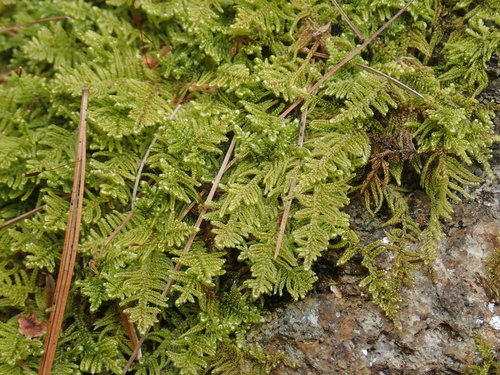

Scientific classification
- Kingdom: Plantae
- Division: Bryophyta
- Class: Bryopsida
- Subclass: Bryidae
- Order: Hypnales
- Family: Pylaisiaceae
- Genus: Callicladium
- Species: C. imponens

Binomial name
- Callicladium imponens (Hedw.) Hedenäs, Schlesak & D.Quandt

Synonyms
- Hypnum imponens Hedw.; Hypnum cupressiforme var. imponens (Hedw.) Mach.; Stereodon imponens (Hedw.) Brid. ex Mitt.

= Callicladium imponens =

Moss species native to North America

Callicladium imponens, also known as brocade moss, is a species of moss native to North America. It is usually golden to yellow-green coloured, sometimes brownish. Its stems are medium to large sized usually reaching 3–10 cm. Unlike some other moss species, C. imponens lacks a hyalodermis but possesses a weak central strand.

== Description ==
The stem leaves of C. imponens are falcate-secund, triangular-ovate to oblong-lanceolate in shape, and gradually taper towards the apex. They measure approximately 1.8 to 2 mm in length and 0.6 to 0.8 mm in width. The base of the leaves is somewhat decurrent without auricles. The leaf margins are either flat or weakly recurved at the base, exhibiting serrulations towards the distal end or rarely being nearly entire. The acumen is slender. C. imponens is dioicous, meaining male and female reproductive structures are produced on separate plants. C. imponens is characterized by its pigmented and heterogeneous alar cells, reddish stems, long-toothed foliose pseudoparaphyllia, and nearly erect cylindric capsules. The branches of this moss species typically emerge in a single horizontal plane.

== Distribution ==
The capsules of C. imponens mature from July to September. C. imponens can be found growing on decaying logs, rocks, and soil at various different elevations. Its distribution spans across Greenland and several Canadian provinces such as New Brunswick, Newfoundland and Labrador, Nova Scotia, Ontario, and Prince Edward Island. It can be found throughout most of the Eastern United States. Additionally, C. imponens is also found in Europe.
