= Jean Étienne Duby =

Swiss clergyman and botanist (1798–1885)

- Born: February 15, 1798; Geneva, Republic of Geneva
- Died: November 24, 1885 (aged 87); Geneva, Switzerland
- Known for: Research on cryptogams, mosses, and the genus Ceramium
- Scientific career
- Fields: Botany, cryptogamy
- Institutions: Conservatoire et Jardin botaniques de Genève
- Author abbrev. (botany): Duby

Jean Étienne Duby (15 February 1798 in Geneva – 24 November 1885) was a Swiss clergyman and botanist.

He studied theology in Geneva, obtaining his consecration in 1820, and having an avid interest in natural history, he earned his degree in natural sciences in 1824. As a young man he was influenced by Augustin Pyramus de Candolle (1778–1841), and made contributions towards Candolle's publication of Botanicon gallicum; seu Synopsis plantarum in Flora gallica descriptarum (1828–1830).

From 1831 to 1863 he served as a pastor in Les Eaux-Vives, Geneva, while in the meantime playing an active role in botany. He specialized in research of cryptogams, including studies of European and exotic mosses, and taxonomic work involving the red algae genus Ceramium. In addition to his work with cryptogams, he conducted studies on the flowering plant family Primulaceae.

In 1860–61 he was president of the Société de physique et d'histoire naturelle de Genève. He was also a corresponding member of the Société de biologie de Paris and of the Moscow Society of Naturalists. Today, his herbarium is part of the "general herbarium" at the Conservatoire et Jardin botaniques in Geneva.

== Selected writings ==
- Essai d'application à une tribu d'algues de quelques principes de taxonomie, ou, Mémoire sur le groupe des Céramiées, 1832.
- Mémoire sur la famille des primulacées, 1844.
- Choix de cryptogames exotiques nouvelles ou mal connues. 1867.
- Mousses exotiques, 1868-1881.

== Legacy ==
The species Vesicularia dubyana is named for Duby.

== Sources ==
- Dictionnaire historique de la Suisse (biography)
