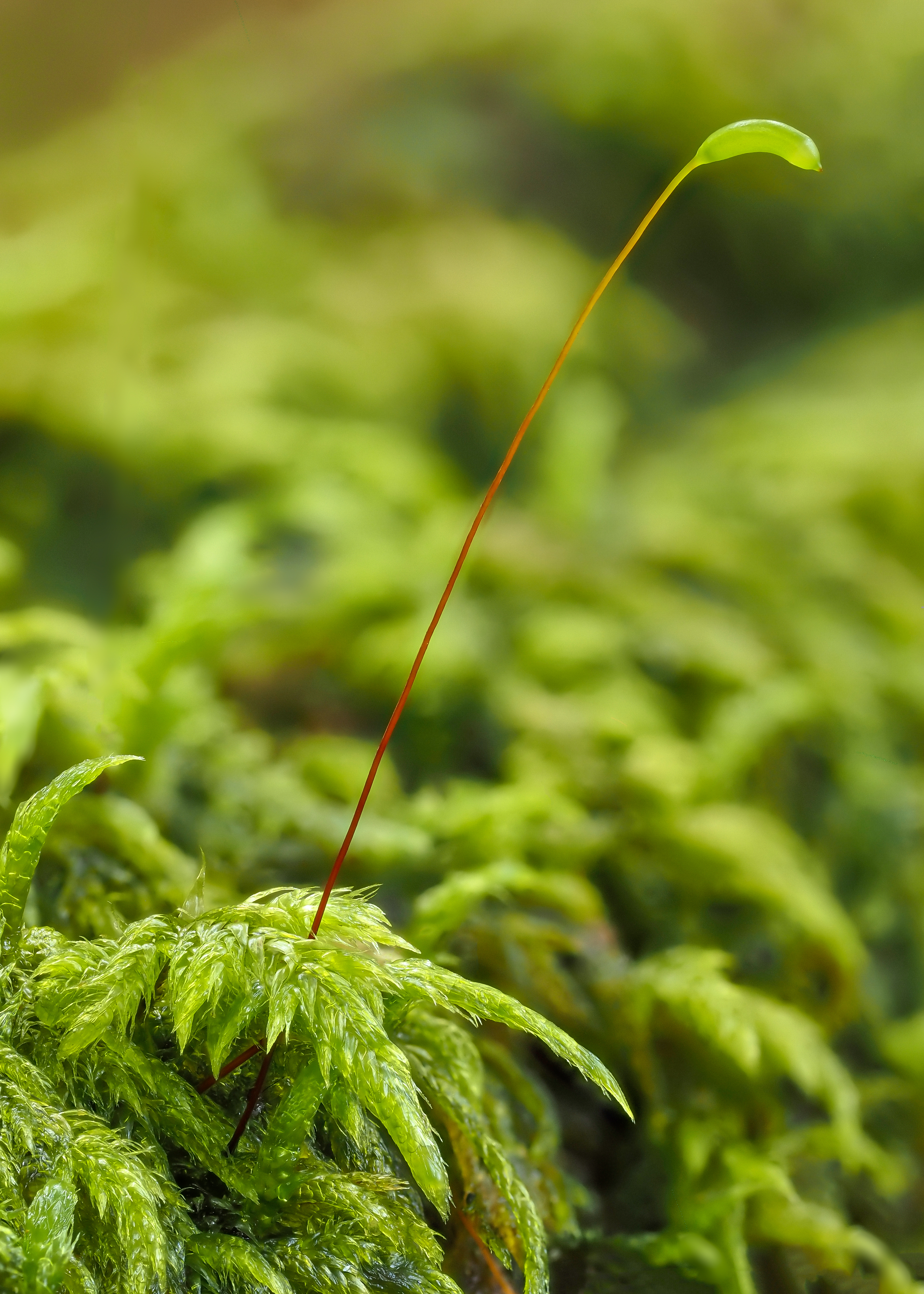
- Heterophyllium nemorosum

Scientific classification
- Kingdom: Plantae
- Division: Bryophyta
- Class: Bryopsida
- Subclass: Bryidae
- Order: Hypnales
- Family: Sematophyllaceae
- Genus: Heterophyllium (Schimp.) C.Müll. ex Kindb.

= Heterophyllium =

Genus of mosses

Heterophyllium is a genus of mosses belonging to the family Sematophyllaceae.

The genus has almost cosmopolitan distribution.

Species:

- Heterophyllium acunae Thériot, 1941
- Heterophyllium adscendens (Lindb.) Broth.
