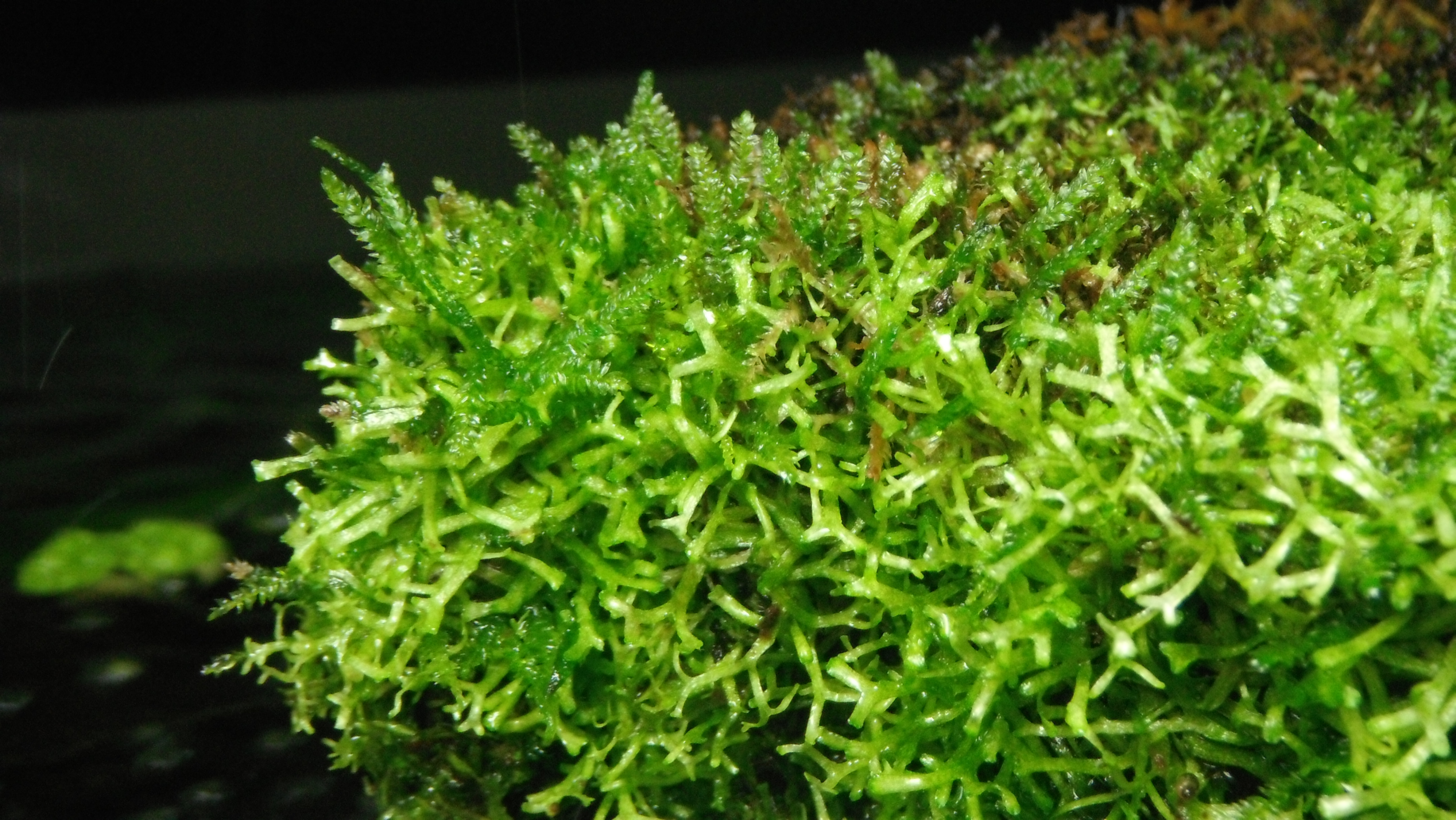
- Riccia growing alongside Christmas moss (back)

Scientific classification
- Kingdom: Plantae
- Division: Bryophyta
- Class: Bryopsida
- Subclass: Bryidae
- Order: Hypnales
- Family: Hypnaceae
- Genus: Vesicularia
- Species: V. montagnei

Binomial name
- Vesicularia montagnei (Bel.) Fleisch.

= Vesicularia montagnei =

Species of moss

Vesicularia montagnei is a species of moss. It is used in planted aquariums as an ornamental underwater plant, commonly referred to as Christmas moss.

It is found in Australia, China, Japan, India, Indonesia, the Philippines, Sri Lanka, Thailand, Sudan, and Vietnam. In its natural habitat it grows in damp situations on rocks and the trunks of trees.
