= Jiří Váňa =

Czech bryologist (1940-2018)

- Born: 11 January 1940; Prague, Protectorate of Bohemia and Moravia
- Died: 8 April 2018 (aged 78); Prague, Czech Republic
- Citizenship: Czech
- Education: Charles University
- Known for: Liverwort systematics
- Scientific career
- Fields: Bryology
- Workplaces: Charles University
- Thesis: Jungermannia subulata Evans aus Hawaii—eine verkannte Sippe der Holarktis (1972)
- Doctoral advisor: Zdeněk Černohorský
- Author abbrev. (botany): Váňa

Jiří Váňa (11 January 1940 – 8 April 2018) was a Czech bryologist with a particular interest in the taxonomy of Jungermanniopsida, specifically the subfamily Jungermannioidae.

== Early life ==
Váňa was born in Prague, but his family moved to Chomutov before he was in primary school. He was principally introduced to botany by an amateur botanist, Josef Lorber, who Váňa accompanied on botanical excursions around Chomutov and the nearby Ore Mountains. Váňa remained in Chomutov until his college days.

== Education ==
Váňa applied to Charles University in Prague in 1957, but was rejected. Váňa appealed this decision and was subsequently accepted.

In 1957, there were no professional bryologists at Charles University's Faculty of Science. Instead, Váňa conducted his diploma thesis under a phycologist and mycologist named Bohuslav Fott, who ran the non-vascular plant division of the botany department. Váňa's thesis, which was eventually published as a paper in 1967, was on the plant communities of peat bogs in the Ore Mountains. He defended his thesis in 1962 and, after his graduation, Fott offered him a position as an Assistant in the Department of Botany. However, his education was interrupted by mandatory military service.

Váňa returned to Charles University and began a Ph.D.-equivalent program in 1965. Once more, he was under the supervision of a professor who was not a bryologist; Zdeněk Černohorský was a lichenologist. His postgraduate thesis was on the taxonomy of Jungermanniaceae, and he defended it successfully in 1972 and received his doctoral degree in natural sciences (RNDr.). He subsequently received the degree of DrSc. in 1986.

== Career ==
Following his graduation, he joined the faculty of Charles University's Department of Botany as an Associate Professor in 1977. He became a full professor in 1987, and between 1986 and 1990, Váňa led the department. He retired in 2005.

== Legacy ==
Váňa contributed significantly to the taxonomy of liverworts around the world, including a number of taxonomically challenging groups (e.g. Cephaloziaceae), and often assisted his colleagues in identification. He also was active in bryological conservation.

The moss genus Jirivanaea is named for him.
