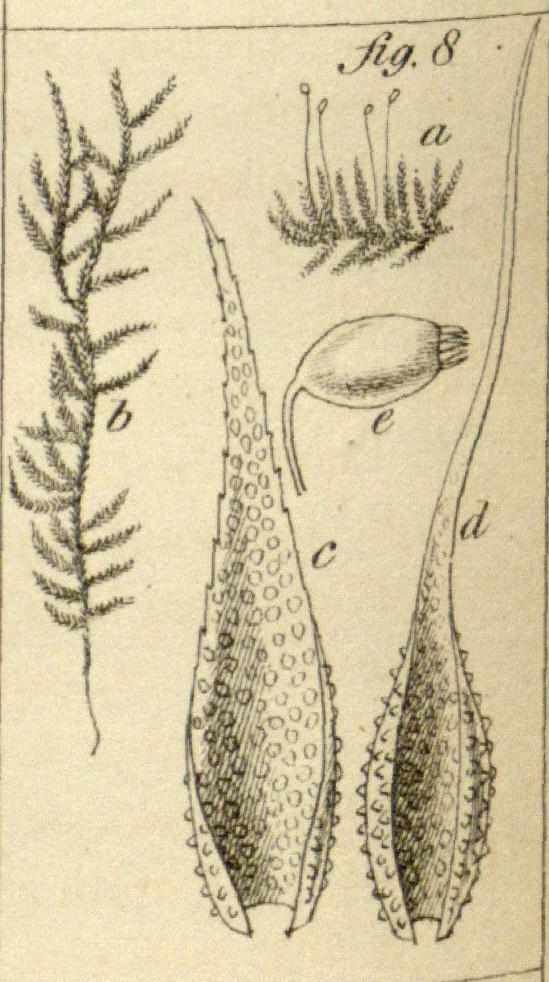
- Illustration from the basionym protologue of the type species, A. papillatum

Scientific classification
- Kingdom: Plantae
- Division: Bryophyta
- Class: Bryopsida
- Subclass: Bryidae
- Order: Hypnales
- Family: Sematophyllaceae
- Genus: Acanthorrhynchium; M.Fleisch., 1923

= Acanthorrhynchium =

Genus of mosses

Acanthorrhynchium is a genus of mosses belonging to the family Sematophyllaceae.

The species of this genus are found in Southeast Asia.

Its type species is Acanthorrhynchium papillatum, which was previously considered to be the type of the older generic name Acanthodium Mitt. 1868. However, Acanthodium is a nomen illegitimum as a later homonym of angiosperm genus name Acanthodium Delile 1813 and thus Acanthorrhynchium is nomenclaturally correct.
