= Phyllodon (plant) =

Scientific classification
- Kingdom: Plantae
- Division: Bryophyta
- Class: Bryopsida
- Subclass: Bryidae
- Order: Hypnales
- Family: Hypnaceae
- Genus: Phyllodon

Species
- Phyllodon abruptus (Mitt.) B.C. Tan Phyllodon bilobatus (Dixon) P. Câmara Phyllodon choiropyxis (Müll. Hal.) P. Câmara Phyllodon glossoides (Bosch & Sande Lac.) P. Câmara Phyllodon ligulaefolius (E.B. Bartram) M. Menzel Phyllodon lingulatus (Cardot) W.R. Buck Phyllodon perplanicaulis (Broth.) Kis Phyllodon scutellifolius (Besch.) W.R. Buck Phyllodon subretusus (Thwaites & Mitt.) Ochyra & R.R. Ireland Phyllodon truncatulus (Müll. Hal.) W.R. Buck Phyllodon truncatus (Welw. & Duby) W.R. Buck.

Genus of mosses

Phyllodon is a genus of moss.
