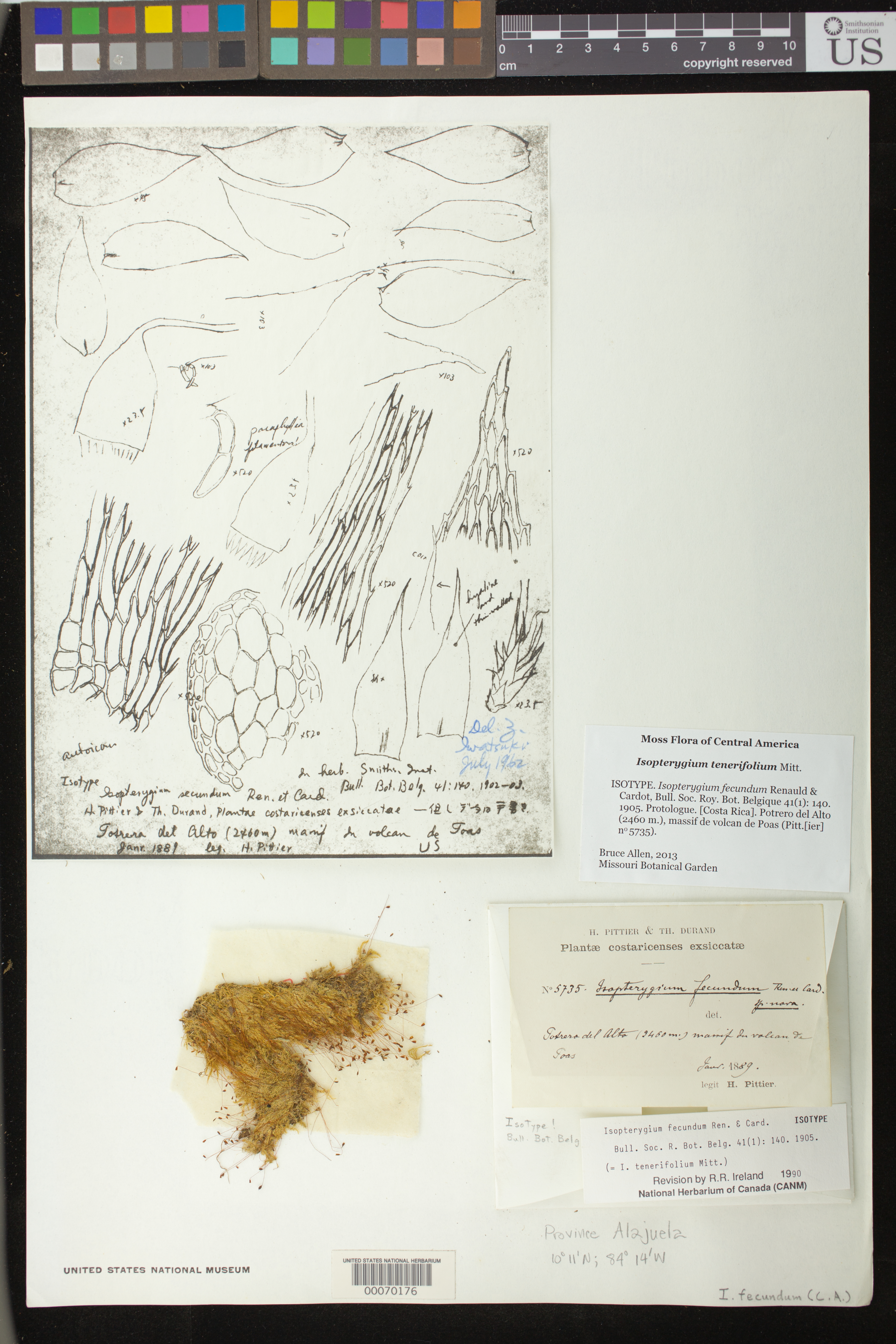
- Isopterygium fecundum

Scientific classification
- Kingdom: Plantae
- Division: Bryophyta
- Class: Bryopsida
- Subclass: Bryidae
- Order: Hypnales
- Family: Hypnaceae
- Genus: Isopterygium; Mitt.

= Isopterygium =

Genus of mosses in Hypnaceae

Isopterygium is a genus of mosses variably placed in the families Hypnaceae and Pylaisiadelphaceae. It includes 137 species and has a cosmopolitan distribution. It was described in 1869 by William Mitten.

The first type species was I. planissimum, which was superseded by the lectotype I. tenerum in 1979.
