= Podperaea =

Scientific classification
- Kingdom: Plantae
- Division: Bryophyta
- Class: Bryopsida
- Subclass: Bryidae
- Order: Hypnales
- Family: Hypnaceae
- Genus: Podperaea; Z.Iwats. & Glime

Species
- See text

Genus of mosses

Podperaea is a genus of Asian mosses in the family Hypnaceae. It was erected by Zennosuke Iwatsuki and Janice Mildred Glime.

== Species ==
Podperaea contains a total of 2 species:

- Podperaea baii Ignatov
- Podperaea krylovii (Podp.) Z.Iwats. & Glime
