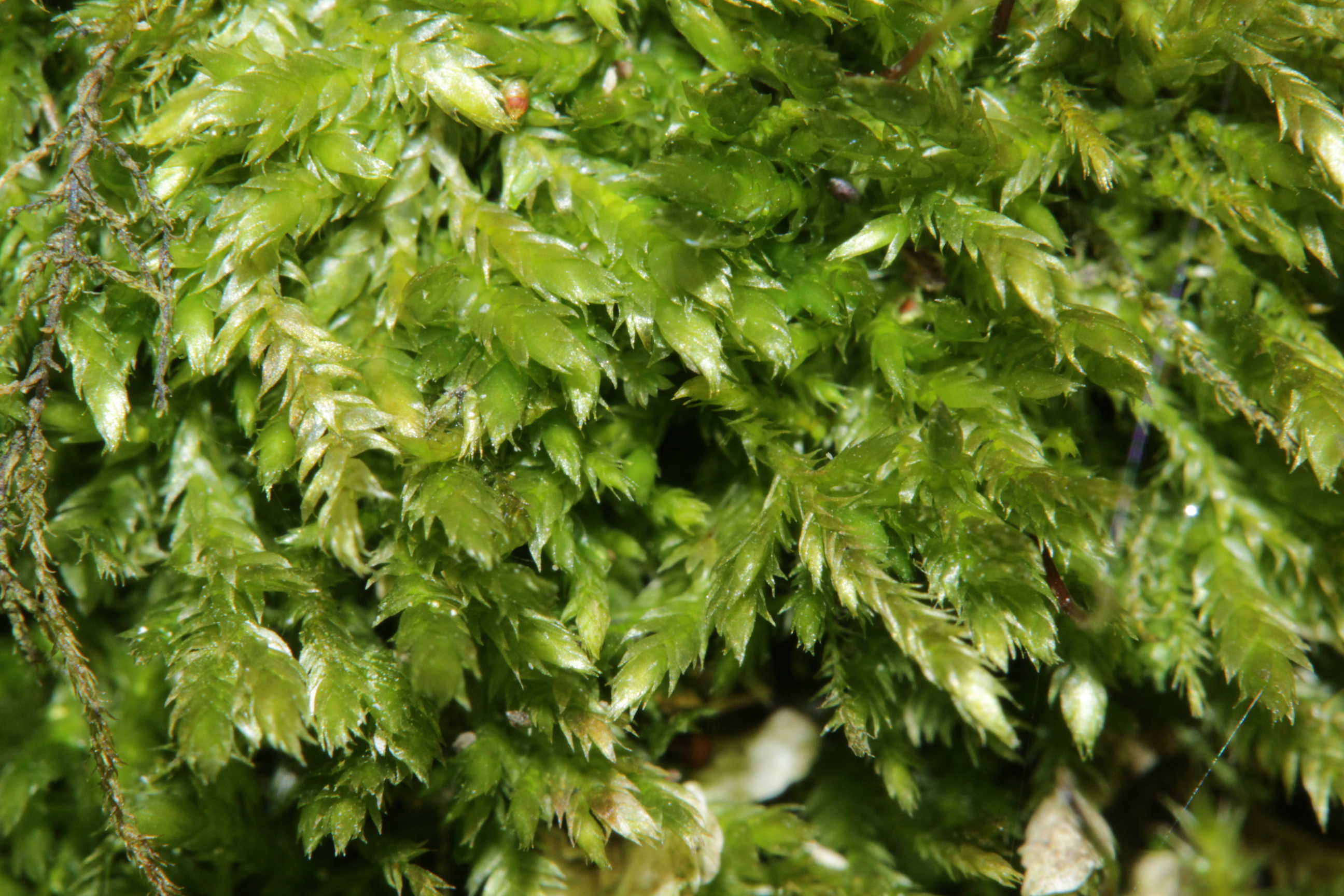
- Taxiphyllum wissgrillii

Scientific classification
- Kingdom: Plantae
- Division: Bryophyta
- Class: Bryopsida
- Subclass: Bryidae
- Order: Hypnales
- Family: Hypnaceae
- Genus: Taxiphyllum; M.Fleisch.

= Taxiphyllum =

Genus mosses

Taxiphyllum is a genus of mosses in the family Hypnaceae.

== Description ==
Moss in the genera are generally medium to large sized and mat forming. Stems are glossy and creeping.

Species are native to North America, South America, Africa, and on islands in the Indian Ocean and Pacific Ocean. Specifically, they have been found in the United States, Mexico, West Indies, Guatemala, India, Japan, Madagascar, Philippines, and Australia.

Taxiphyllum barbieri is economically important as a common plant used in freshwater aquariums. It is sold under the name 'Java moss'.

== Species ==
Species adapted from The Plant List;

- Taxiphyllum alare (Broth. & Yasuda) S.H. Lin
- Taxiphyllum alternans (Cardot) Z. Iwats.
- Taxiphyllum angustirete (Broth.) W.R. Buck
- Taxiphyllum aomoriense (Besch.) Z. Iwats.
- Taxiphyllum arcuatum (Bosch & Sande Lac.) S. He
- Taxiphyllum assimile (Broth. ex Iisiba) Sakurai
- Taxiphyllum barbieri (Cardot & Copp.) Z. Iwats.
- Taxiphyllum cavernicola (Cardot) Thér.
- Taxiphyllum cuspidifolium (Cardot) Z. Iwats.
- Taxiphyllum densifolium (Lindb. ex Broth.) Reimers
- Taxiphyllum deplanatum (Bruch & Schimp. ex Sull.) M. Fleisch.
- Taxiphyllum eberhardtii (Broth. & Paris) Broth.
- Taxiphyllum elegantifrons (Müll. Hal.) Broth.
- Taxiphyllum eximium (Sull. & Lesq.) Z. Iwats.
- Taxiphyllum geophilum (Austin) M. Fleisch.
- Taxiphyllum giraldii (Müll. Hal.) M. Fleisch.
- Taxiphyllum gracile (Besch.) S.H. Lin
- Taxiphyllum hisauchii (S. Okamura) Iisiba
- Taxiphyllum isopterygioides (Dixon) W.R. Buck
- Taxiphyllum kuroiwae (Broth.) Z. Iwats.
- Taxiphyllum laevifolium (Mitt.) W.R. Buck
- Taxiphyllum ligulaefolium (E.B. Bartram) W.R. Buck
- Taxiphyllum mariannae (Grout) Schornh.
- Taxiphyllum minutirameum (Müll. Hal.) H.A. Mill. & D.R. Sm.
- Taxiphyllum moutieri (Broth. & Paris) Broth.
- Taxiphyllum nitidum (Thér.) W.R. Buck
- Taxiphyllum papuanum (Broth.) M. Fleisch.
- Taxiphyllum pilosum (Broth. & M. Yasuda) Z. Iwats.
- Taxiphyllum planifrons (Broth. & Paris) M. Fleisch.
- Taxiphyllum prostratum (Dozy & Molk.) W.R. Buck
- Taxiphyllum robusticaule (E.B. Bartram) Ireland Accepted L TRO
- Taxiphyllum robustum (Broth.) Broth.
- Taxiphyllum sadoense (Sakurai) Z. Iwats.
- Taxiphyllum scalpellifolium (Müll. Hal.) Broth.
- Taxiphyllum schweinfurthii (Müll. Hal.) W.R. Buck
- Taxiphyllum serrulatum (Cardot) S.H. Lin
- Taxiphyllum splendescens (Müll. Hal.) M. Fleisch.
- Taxiphyllum squamatulum (Müll. Hal.) M. Fleisch.
- Taxiphyllum subarcuatum (Broth.) Z. Iwats.
- Taxiphyllum subassimile (Broth. ex Iisiba) Sakurai
- Taxiphyllum taxirameum (Mitt.) M. Fleisch.
- Taxiphyllum torrentium (Besch.) W.R. Buck
- Taxiphyllum tsunodae (Broth.) Sakurai
- Taxiphyllum wissgrillii (Garov.) Wijk & Margad.
