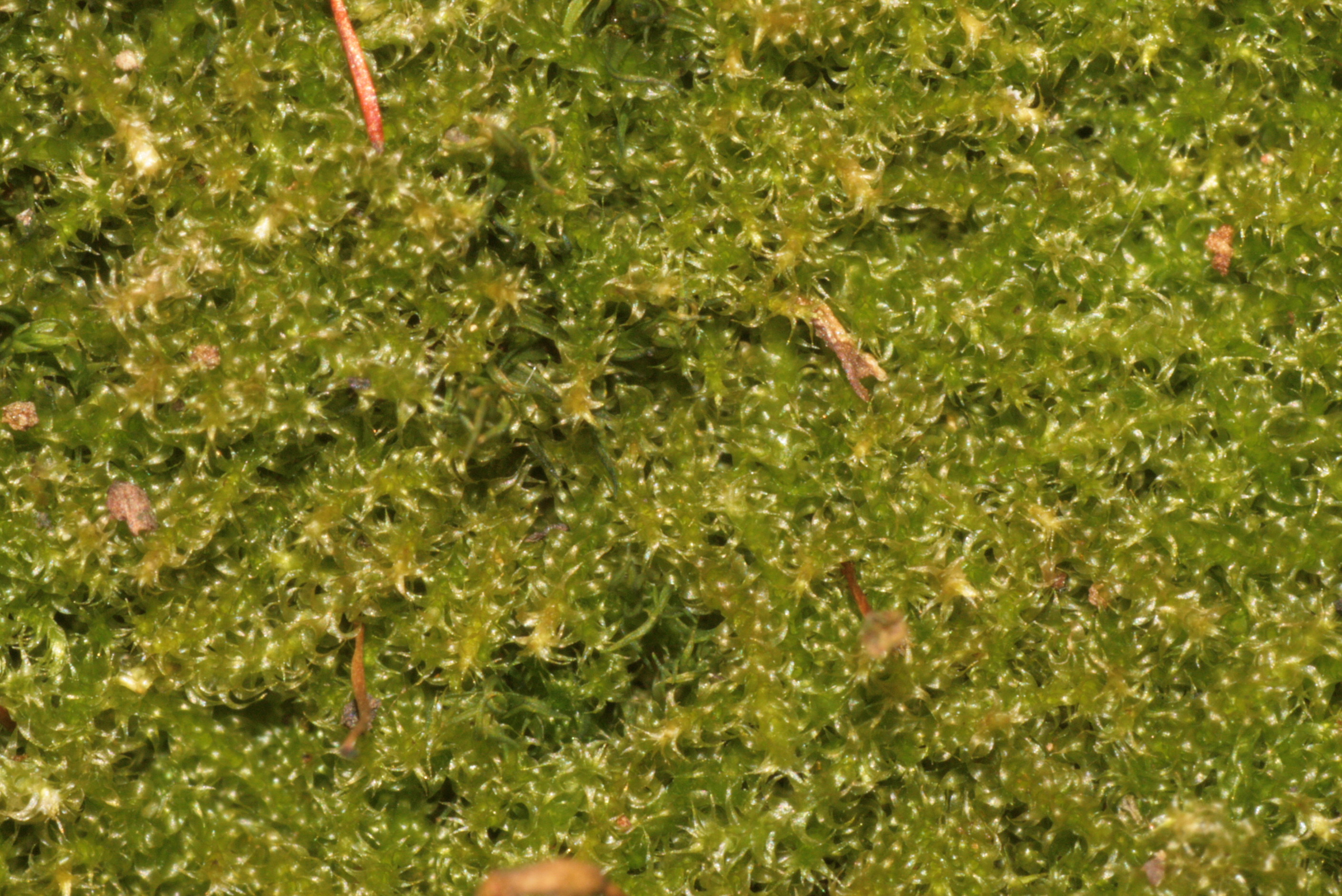
- Campylophyllum halleri

Scientific classification
- Kingdom: Plantae
- Division: Bryophyta
- Class: Bryopsida
- Subclass: Bryidae
- Order: Hypnales
- Family: Hypnaceae
- Genus: Campylophyllum (Schimp.) M.Fleisch.

= Campylophyllum =

Genus of mosses

Campylophyllum is a genus of mosses belonging to the family Hypnaceae.

The genus was first described by Wilhelm Philippe Schimper.

The species of this genus are found in Europe and America.

Species:

- Campylophyllum calcareum
- Campylophyllum halleri
- Campylophyllum sommerfeltii
