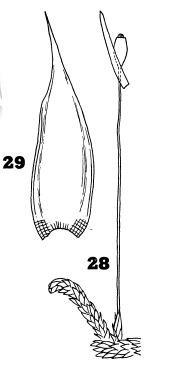

Conservation status
- Critically Endangered (IUCN 3.1)

Scientific classification
- Kingdom: Plantae
- Division: Bryophyta
- Class: Bryopsida
- Subclass: Bryidae
- Order: Hypnales
- Family: Hypnaceae
- Genus: Acritodon
- Species: A. nephophilus

Binomial name
- Acritodon nephophilus H.Rob.

= Acritodon =

Genus of mosses

Acritodon is a genus of moss in the family Hypnaceae. It is a monotypic genus only containing the species Acritodon nephophilus Acritodon nephophilus is endemic to Mexico, where it is known only from two locations in the Sierra Madre de Oaxaca of Oaxaca state. Its natural habitat is subtropical or tropical moist lowland forests. It is threatened by habitat loss. Conservation efforts for this species have difficulty protecting local populations due to insufficient attention and legislation regarding preservation of moss species.
