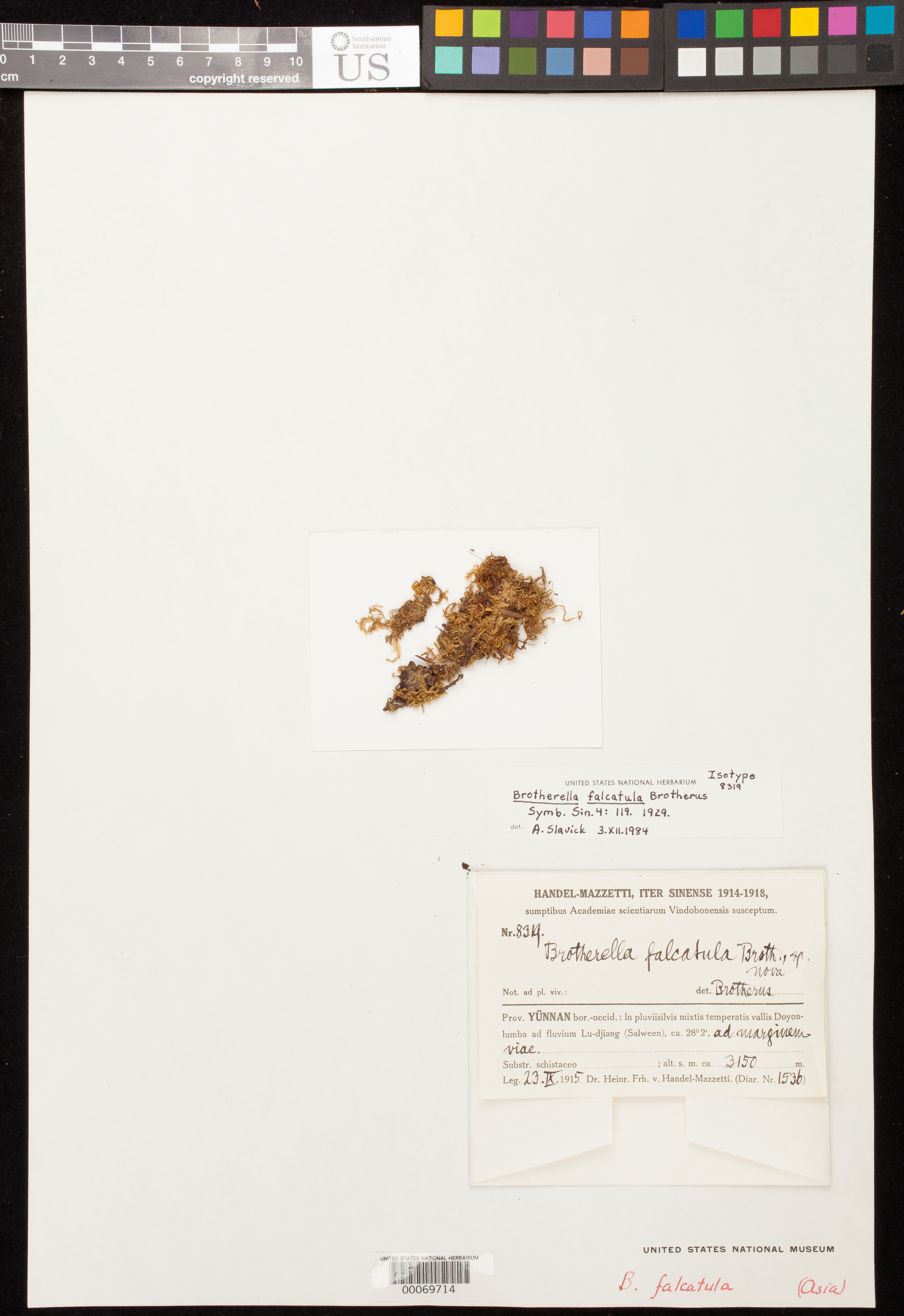
- Brotherella falcatula

Scientific classification
- Kingdom: Plantae
- Division: Bryophyta
- Class: Bryopsida
- Subclass: Bryidae
- Order: Hypnales
- Family: Pylaisiadelphaceae; Broth.

Genera
- See classification

= Pylaisiadelphaceae =

Family of mosses within Hypnales

Pylaisiadelphaceae is a family of mosses in the order Hypnales described in 2004 by Bernard Goffinet and William R. Buck. They gave Pylaisiadelpha as the type genus, though it is not always included in the family today.

It was subsequently included in part 4 of Bruce Allen's Moss Flora of Central America, published in 2018.

== Classification ==
This list of included genera is an amalgamation of World Flora Online, Tropicos and the Bryophyte Nomenclator. (Note: This list is as inclusive as possible and does not aim to make taxonomic judgements.)

- Aptychella (Broth.) Herzog
- Aptychellites Schäf.-Verw., Hedenäs, Ignatov & Heinrichs
- Bonnosukea H.Akiyama
- Brotherella Loeske ex M.Fleisch
- Clastobryellina (M.Fleisch) H.Akiyama
- Clastobryopsis H. Akiyama, Ying Chang & B.C. Tan
- Clastobryum Dozy & Molk.
- Gammiella Broth.
- Hageniella Broth.
- Heterophyllium (Schimp.) Müll.Hal. ex Kindb.
- Isocladiella Dixon
- Isocladiellopsis B.C.Tan, T.J.Kop. & D.H.Norris
- Isopterygium Mitt.
- Mastopoma Cardot
- Microgammiella H.Akiyama
- Notohypnum Jan Kučera & Ignatov
- Orientobryum H.Akiyama
- Platygyrium Schimp.
- Pseudotrismegistia H.Akiyama & H.Tsubota
- Pterogonidium Müll.Hal.
- Pylaisiadelpha Cardot
- Rovnohypnum Ignatov
- Taxitheliella Dixon
- Taxithelium Spruce ex Mitt.
- Trachyphyllum A.Gepp
- Trismegistia (Müll.Hal.) Müll.Hal.
- Trochophyllohypnum Jan Kučera & Ignatov
- Wijkia H.A.Crum
- Yakushimabryum H.Akiyama, Ying Chang, T.Yamag. & B.C.Tan
