= Jirivanaea =

- Jirivanaea galipensis

Scientific classification
- Kingdom: Plantae
- Division: Bryophyta
- Class: Bryopsida
- Subclass: Bryidae
- Order: Hypnales
- Family: Sematophyllaceae
- Genus: Jirivanaea; U.B. Deshmukh & Rathor

Genus of mosses

Jirivanaea is a genus of mosses in the family Sematophyllaceae. It contains five species.

== Etymology ==
Jirivanaea was named for Jiří Váňa, a bryologist from the Czech Republic.

== Range ==
The species within Jirivanaea occur in South America, Central America, Mexico, and some Caribbean islands.

== History ==
A 2017 paper determined that Acroporium and Sematophyllum were paraphyletic on the basis of morphological and molecular data. A new genus, Vitalia, was proposed, with Vitalia caespitosa (formerly Acroporium caespitosum) designated as the type species. However, the generic name Vitalia is already in use in fungal taxonomy. Jirivanaea is a substitute name for the same four species. In 2023, a new species was described from Brazil.

== Description ==
Jirivanaea is a pleurocarpous moss, meaning its main stem is indeterminate and its branches may morphologically differ from it. Carvalho-Silva et al. describe Vitalia as being "robust with galeate leaves and brotherelloid cells." The stems of Jirivanaea are creeping, freely branched, and lack a central strand and paraphyllia. Leaves differ little between stem and branch; are erect, never homomallous, galeate, oblong-ovate or ovate, and concave; with entire margins and without a costa. Cells are linear and smooth, while alar cells are inflated and colored. Setae are elongate and smooth, with capsules sub-erect to pendent; the annulus is not differentiated, and the operculum long-rostrate. Spores are spherical and finely papillose.

== Species ==
- Jirivanaea caespitosa (Hedw.) U.B. Deshmukh & Rathor
- Jirivanaea ciliata M.E. Santos
- Jirivanaea cuspidifera (Mitt.) U.B. Deshmukh & Rathor
- Jirivanaea esmeraldica (Müll. Hal.) U.B. Deshmukh & Rathor
- Jirivanaea galipensis (Müll. Hal.) U.B. Deshmukh & Rathor
