= Orthothecium =

Scientific classification
- Kingdom: Plantae
- Division: Bryophyta
- Class: Bryopsida
- Subclass: Bryidae
- Order: Hypnales
- Family: Hypnaceae
- Genus: Orthothecium; Schimp.

Genus of mosses

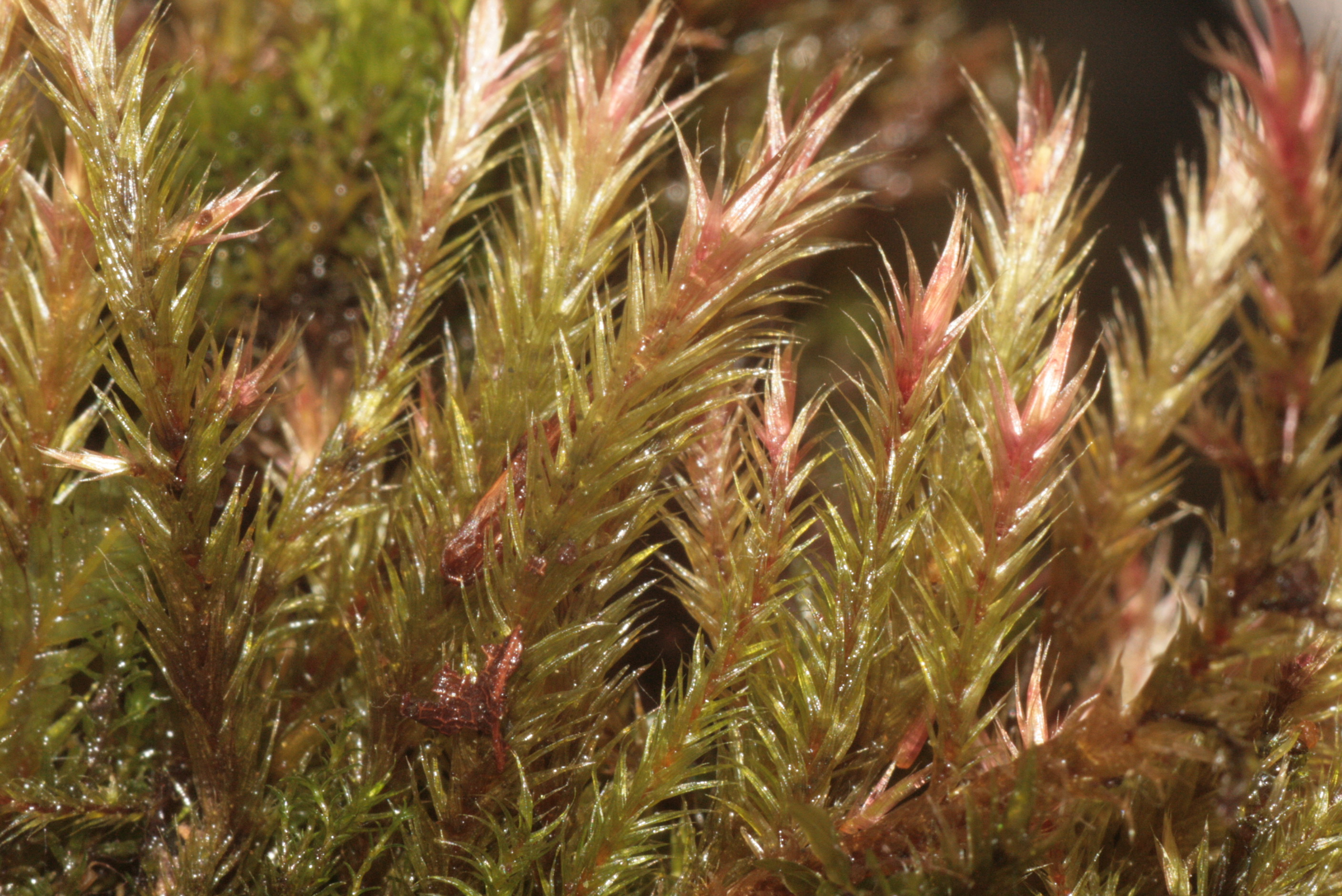

Orthothecium is a genus of mosses belonging to the family Hypnaceae.

The species of this genus are found in Eurasia, New Zealand and Northern America.

Species:

- Orthothecium acuminatum Bryhn, 1907
- Orthothecium austrocatenulatum Kindberg, 1891
- Orthothecium bollei (De Not.) A. Jaeger
- Orthothecium celebesiae (Müll. Hal.) A. Jaeger
- Orthothecium chryseum (Schwägr.) Schimp.
- Orthothecium diminutivum (Grout) H.A. Crum, Steere & L.E. Anderson
- Orthothecium duriaei (Mont.) Besch.
- Orthothecium filum (Müll. Hal.) Kindb.
- Orthothecium hyalopiliferum Redf. & B.H. Allen
- Orthothecium intricatum (Hartm.) Schimp.
- Orthothecium lapponicum (Schimp.) C. Hartm.
- Orthothecium nilgheriense (Mont.) A. Jaeger
- Orthothecium ovicarpum (Dixon) W.R. Buck
- Orthothecium rufescens (Dicks. ex Brid.) Schimp.
- Orthothecium schlagintweitii (Sendtn. ex Müll. Hal.) Paris
- Orthothecium strictum Lorentz
- Orthothecium trichophyllum (Sw. ex Hedw.) M. Fleisch.
