= Rhaphidorrhynchium =

Scientific classification
- Kingdom: Plantae
- Division: Bryophyta
- Class: Bryopsida
- Subclass: Bryidae
- Order: Hypnales
- Family: Sematophyllaceae
- Genus: Rhaphidorrhynchium; Besch. ex M. Fleisch.

Genus of plants

Rhaphidorrhynchium is a genus of mosses in the family Sematophyllaceae. The species in this genus are predominantly found in the Southern Hemisphere.

== Taxonomy ==
Rhaphidorrhynchium contains the following species:

- Rhaphidorrhynchium lindigii
- Rhaphidorrhynchium jolliffii
- Rhaphidorrhynchium cerviculatum
- Rhaphidorrhynchium leucocytus
- Rhaphidorrhynchium tenuirostre
- Rhaphidorrhynchium dendroligotrichum
- Rhaphidorrhynchium amoenum
