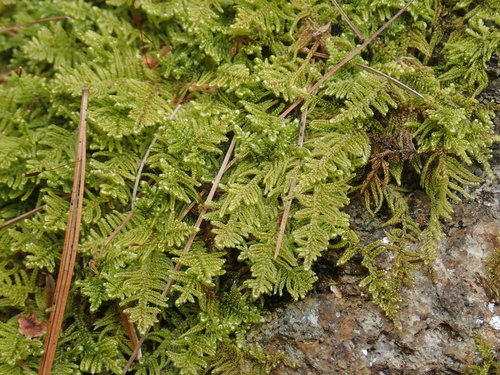
- Callicladium imponens

Scientific classification
- Kingdom: Plantae
- Clade: Embryophytes
- Division: Bryophyta
- Class: Bryopsida
- Subclass: Bryidae
- Order: Hypnales
- Family: Pylaisiaceae
- Genus: Callicladium; H.A.Crum

Species
- Callicladium haldanianum; Callicladium imponens

= Callicladium =

Genus of mosses

Callicladium is a genus of mosses belonging to the family Hypnaceae. It formerly only held one species, Callicladium haldanianum, but now it holds multiple.
