= Breidleria =

Scientific classification
- Kingdom: Plantae
- Division: Bryophyta
- Class: Bryopsida
- Subclass: Bryidae
- Order: Hypnales
- Family: Hypnaceae
- Genus: Breidleria; Loeske

Genus of mosses

Breidleria is a genus of mosses belonging to the family Hypnaceae.

The genus was first described by Loeske.

The species of this genus are found in Eurasia and Northern America.

Species:

- Breidleria pratensis (W.D.J.Koch ex Spruce) Loeske

The genus name of Breidleria is in honour of Johann Breidler (1828 - 1913), an Austrian architect and botanist (studying Bryology and Mckology), from Leoben.

The genus was circumscribed by Leopold Loeske in Stud. Morph. Laubm. (Loeske) on page 172 in 1910.
