= Chryso-hypnum =

Scientific classification
- Kingdom: Plantae
- Division: Bryophyta
- Class: Bryopsida
- Subclass: Bryidae
- Order: Hypnales
- Family: Hypnaceae
- Genus: Chryso-hypnum; Hampe

Genus of mosses

Chryso-hypnum is a genus of mosses belonging to the family Hypnaceae.

== Species ==
Ten species are recognised:

- Chryso-hypnum cavifolium (Dixon) Ochyra & Sharp
- Chryso-hypnum crosbyi B.H. Allen
- Chryso-hypnum demaretii (P. de la Varde) Higuchi
- Chryso-hypnum diminutivum (Hampe) W.R. Buck
- Chryso-hypnum elegantulum (Hook.) Hampe
- Chryso-hypnum frondosum (Mitt.) W.R. Buck
- Chryso-hypnum hylophilum (Müll. Hal.) B.H. Allen
- Chryso-hypnum patens Hampe
- Chryso-hypnum rostratulum (Renauld & Cardot) B.H. Allen
- Chryso-hypnum smithii (R.S. Williams) B.H. Allen
