= Mahua (moss) =

Scientific classification
- Kingdom: Plantae
- Division: Bryophyta
- Class: Bryopsida
- Subclass: Bryidae
- Order: Hypnales
- Family: Hypnaceae
- Genus: Mahua; W.R.Buck, 1983

Genus of mosses

Mahua is a genus of moss belonging to the family Sematophyllaceae.

The species of this genus are found in South America.

Species:

- Mahua enervis W.R.Buck, 1983
