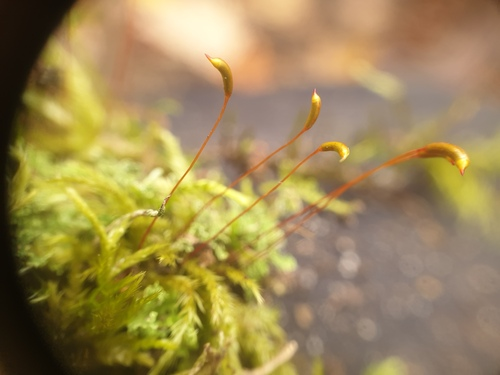

Conservation status
- Secure (NatureServe)

Scientific classification
- Kingdom: Plantae
- Division: Bryophyta
- Class: Bryopsida
- Subclass: Bryidae
- Order: Hypnales
- Family: Pylaisiaceae
- Genus: Callicladium
- Species: C. haldanianum

Binomial name
- Callicladium haldanianum (Grev.) H.A. Crum

Synonyms
- Heterophyllium haldanianum (Grev.) Fleisch.; Hypnum haldanianum Grev.; Robinsonia haldaniana (Grev.) Crum

= Callicladium haldanianum =

Moss species native to North America

Callicladium haldanianum, commonly known as beautiful branch moss, or in horticulture tousled treasure moss, is a species of moss native to North America. It is known for its easy care requirements, vibrant colours, and suitability for terrariums. This slow-growing plant remains small in size and exhibits adaptability to different environments, along with resistance to pests and diseases. During the autumn and winter seasons, Callicladium haldanianum produces reddish orange-brown capsules that develop slight wrinkles when dry.

== Description ==
Callicladium haldanianum features stems ranging from 3 to 8 centimetres in length, with small cortical cells characterised by thick walls. Pseudoparaphyllia are few in number, and clusters of smooth rhizoids are found just below the leaf insertion. The plant's leaves are densely packed and possess an upturned-homomallous arrangement, particularly near the branch ends. Even when dried, the leaves maintain their concave shape and measure approximately 1 to 2 millimetres in length and 0.5 to 0.8 millimetres in width. The moss is recognised for its distinguishing characteristics, including concave leaves, a short double costa, curved nearly erect capsules, and sword-shaped branches that are shortly tapered and somewhat flattened.

== Distribution ==
Callicladium haldanianum can be found in a variety of habitats, including logs, stumps, conifer and hardwood forests, the base of trees, soil, rocks, and forests. It is distributed across different regions, with occurrences in various Canadian provinces and U.S. states. Callicladium haldanianum is also present in Europe and Asia. In its natural environment, Callicladium haldanianum forms flat or loose extensive mats that tend to exclude other species.

== Cultivation ==
Due to its low maintenance requirements and appealing aesthetics, Callicladium haldanianum has gained popularity as a favoured plant for terrariums. Its ability to thrive in moist conditions and preference for indirect sunlight make it an ideal addition to indoor environments.
