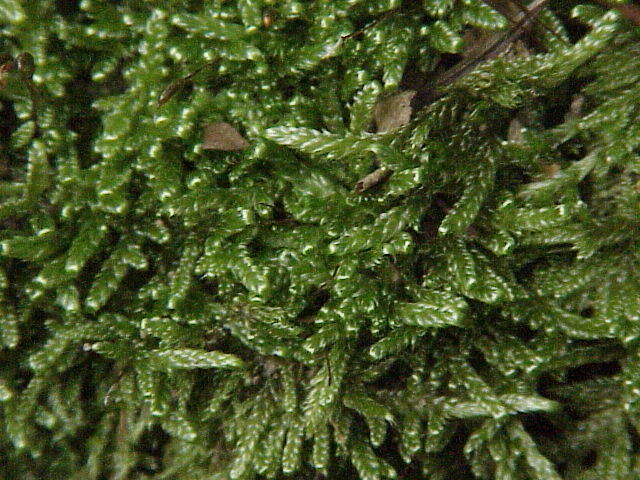

Conservation status
- Least Concern (IUCN 3.1)

- Secure (NatureServe)

Scientific classification
- Kingdom: Plantae
- Division: Bryophyta
- Class: Bryopsida
- Subclass: Bryidae
- Order: Hypnales
- Family: Hypnaceae
- Genus: Hypnum
- Species: H. cupressiforme

Binomial name
- Hypnum cupressiforme Hedw.

= Hypnum cupressiforme =

Species of moss

Hypnum cupressiforme, the cypress-leaved plaitmoss or hypnum moss, is a common and widespread species of moss belonging to the genus Hypnum. It is found in all continents except Antarctica and occurs in a wide variety of habitats and climatic zones. It typically grows on tree trunks, logs, walls, rocks and other surfaces. It prefers acidic environments and is fairly tolerant of pollution. It was formerly used as a filling for pillows and mattresses; the association with sleep is the origin of the genus name Hypnum (from Greek Hypnos).

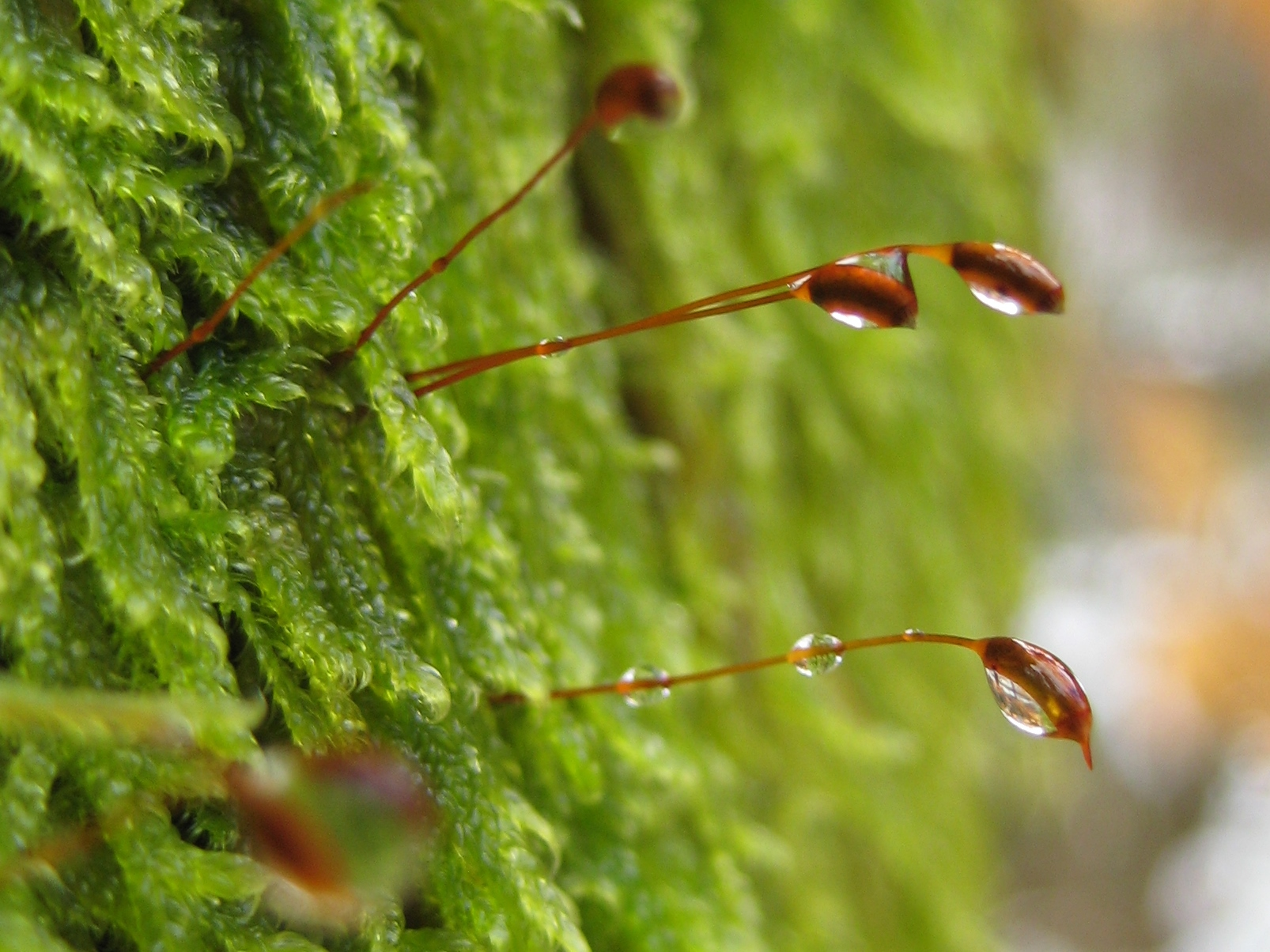
Capsules

This small to medium-sized moss is about 2–10 cm long. It is pleurocarpous, with prostrate, creeping stems that form smooth, dense mats. The branched stems are covered in overlapping leaves, giving the impression of a cypress tree. The stem leaves are long and thin, measuring 1.0-2.1 mm by 0.3-0.6 mm. They are concave and sickle-shaped, tapering towards the tip. The branch leaves are smaller and narrower than the stem leaves. The moss produces short, cylindrical and slightly curved capsules which contain the spores. These capsules measure 1.7-2.4 mm in length and have a lid-like operculum measuring 0.6-0.9 mm. They are borne on reddish-brown stalks which are 1–2.5 cm long. The moss is dioicous, meaning that it has separate male and female plants. Numerous varieties of Hypnum cupressiforme have been described, making it a highly variable species.
