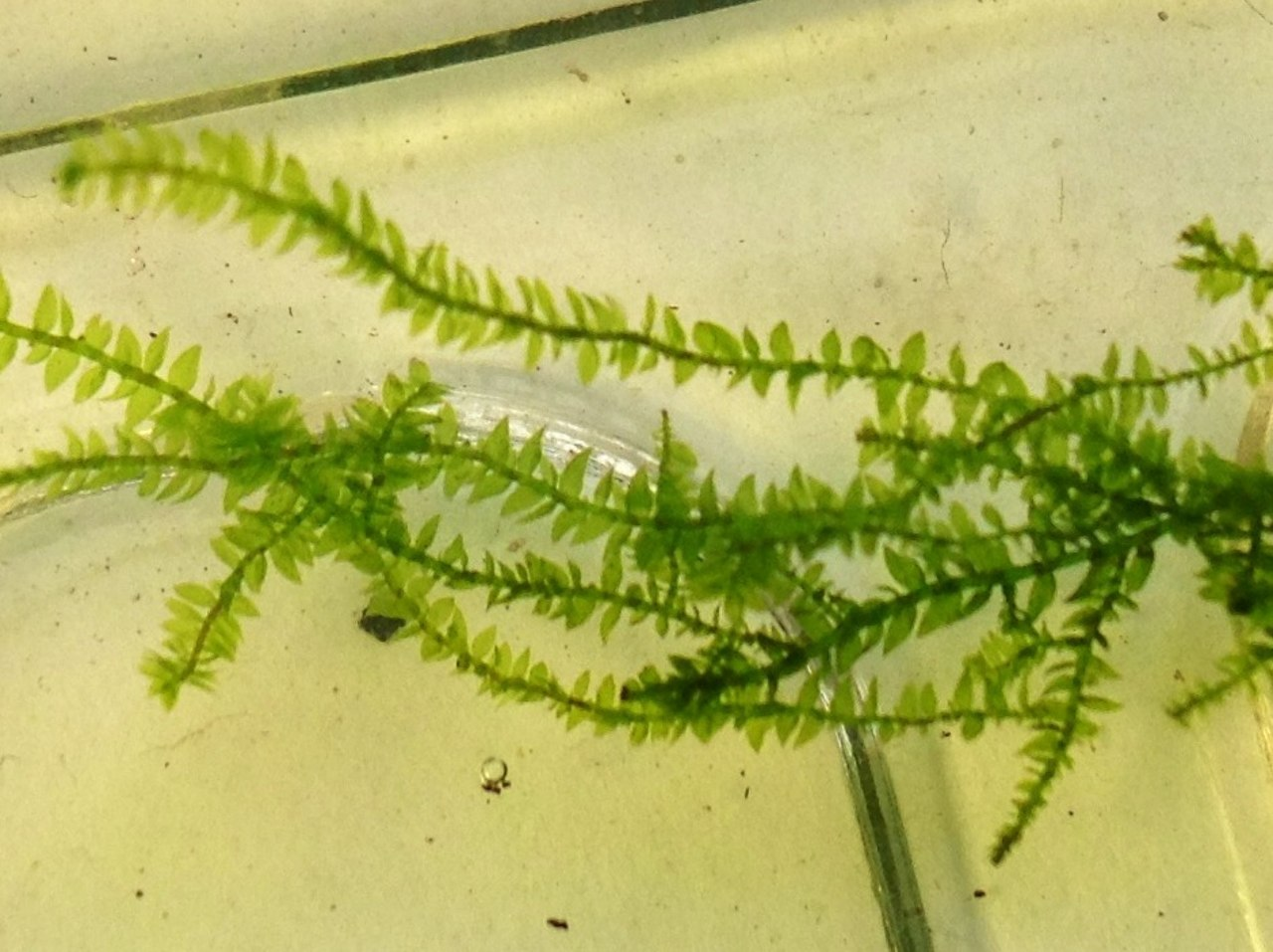
- Vesicularia dubyana

Scientific classification
- Kingdom: Plantae
- Division: Bryophyta
- Class: Bryopsida
- Subclass: Bryidae
- Order: Hypnales
- Family: Hypnaceae
- Genus: Vesicularia (Müll.Hal.) Müll.Hal.

= Vesicularia (plant) =

Genus of mosses

Vesicularia is a genus of mosses belonging to the family Hypnaceae.

== Species ==
Species adapted from World Flora Online;

- Vesicularia acinacifolia (Hampe) Broth.
- Vesicularia albo-viridis (Renauld) Broth.
- Vesicularia amboinensis Broth.
- Vesicularia angustifolia Dixon
- Vesicularia anisothecia Dixon ex E.B. Bartram
- Vesicularia aperta (Sull.) Thér.
- Vesicularia aquatilis Müll. Hal.
- Vesicularia argentinica Broth.
- Vesicularia ayresii (Schimp. ex Besch.) Broth.
- Vesicularia bescherellei (Renauld) Broth.
- Vesicularia borealis Dixon
- Vesicularia brachytheciopsis (Müll. Hal.) Broth.
- Vesicularia buruensis Dixon
- Vesicularia caloblasta Broth. & Dixon
- Vesicularia calodictyon (Müll. Hal.) Müll. Hal.
- Vesicularia caloosiensis (Austin) H.A. Crum
- Vesicularia chlorotica (Besch.) Broth.
- Vesicularia codonopyxis (Müll. Hal.) Broth.
- Vesicularia combae (Renauld & Cardot) Broth.
- Vesicularia conostega (Müll. Hal.) Müll. Hal.
- Vesicularia crassicaulis (Mitt.) Broth.
- Vesicularia crassiramea (Renauld & Cardot) Broth.
- Vesicularia cruegeri Müll. Hal.
- Vesicularia cuspidata S. Okamura
- Vesicularia debilis (Besch.) Broth. ex Paris
- Vesicularia demangei Thér. & P. de la Varde
- Vesicularia dubyana (Müll. Hal.) Broth.
- Vesicularia ectropotheciopsis D.H. Norris & T.J. Kop.
- Vesicularia elegantula Dixon & Herzog
- Vesicularia eligiana W.R. Buck
- Vesicularia eurycladia (Besch.) Broth.
- Vesicularia eurydictyon (Besch.) Broth.
- Vesicularia ferriei (Cardot & Thér.) Broth.
- Vesicularia firma Dixon & P. de la Varde
- Vesicularia flaccida (Sull. & Lesq.) Z. Iwats.
- Vesicularia flavo-viridis (Mitt.) Broth. ex Paris
- Vesicularia fonticola P. de la Varde
- Vesicularia galerulata (Duby) Broth.
- Vesicularia glaucina (Besch.) Broth.
- Vesicularia glaucissima (Müll. Hal.) Broth.
- Vesicularia glaucopinnata Müll. Hal.
- Vesicularia glaucula (Broth.) Broth.
- Vesicularia glazioviana Müll. Hal.
- Vesicularia golungensis (Welw. & Duby) Broth.
- Vesicularia hainanensis P.C. Chen
- Vesicularia hamata E.B. Bartram
- Vesicularia hapalyptera (Müll. Hal.) Broth.
- Vesicularia hilliana (Hampe) B.H. Allen
- Vesicularia hygrobium (Besch.) Broth.
- Vesicularia immunda (Renauld) Cardot
- Vesicularia immutata Dixon
- Vesicularia inflectens (Brid.) Müll. Hal.
- Vesicularia inundata Thér.
- Vesicularia ischyropteris (Broth.) Müll. Hal.
- Vesicularia isopterygiiforme (Cardot & Thér.) Broth.
- Vesicularia janowskyi M. Fleisch.
- Vesicularia kurzii (A. Jaeger) Broth.
- Vesicularia latiramea Broth.
- Vesicularia lepervanchei (Besch.) Broth.
- Vesicularia leptoblasta (Broth. & Paris) Broth.
- Vesicularia leucocladium (Besch.) Broth.
- Vesicularia levieri Cardot
- Vesicularia lonchocormus Broth. & Paris
- Vesicularia longo-fluitans (Broth.) Broth.
- Vesicularia loricatifolia (Broth.) Broth.
- Vesicularia marginata Thér.
- Vesicularia mayumbensis (Besch.) Broth.
- Vesicularia meyeniana (Hampe) Broth.
- Vesicularia miquelii (Sande Lac.) M. Fleisch.
- Vesicularia montagnei (Schimp.) Broth.
- Vesicularia nanocarpa (Müll. Hal.) Broth.
- Vesicularia nigeriana Broth. & Paris
- Vesicularia nitidula Cardot & P. de la Varde
- Vesicularia nutans (A. Jaeger) Broth.
- Vesicularia ochracea Sakurai
- Vesicularia oedicarpa Müll. Hal.
- Vesicularia orbicifolia Müll. Hal.
- Vesicularia oreadelphus (Broth.) Broth.
- Vesicularia padangensis M. Fleisch.
- Vesicularia paranahybae Müll. Hal.
- Vesicularia paulensis (Geh. & Hampe) Broth.
- Vesicularia pelvifolia Müll. Hal.
- Vesicularia perangusta Dixon
- Vesicularia perpallida (Broth.) Broth.
- Vesicularia perpinnata (Broth.) Broth.
- Vesicularia perreticulata Broth. ex Dixon
- Vesicularia perviridis (Ångström) Müll. Hal.
- Vesicularia pilifera Dixon
- Vesicularia piliretis (Broth.) Broth.
- Vesicularia plicaefolia M. Fleisch.
- Vesicularia poeppigiana (Hampe) H.A. Crum & Steere
- Vesicularia pycnodontia (Müll. Hal.) Broth.
- Vesicularia reimersiana Bizot & P. de la Varde
- Vesicularia reticulata (Dozy & Molk.) Broth.
- Vesicularia rhynchostegiocarpa (Broth. & Paris) Broth.
- Vesicularia rivalis Broth.
- Vesicularia rodriguezii (Renauld & Cardot) Broth.
- Vesicularia rootii (Paris & Broth.) Broth.
- Vesicularia rotundifolia (S. Okamura) Sakurai
- Vesicularia rutilans (Brid.) Broth. ex Paris
- Vesicularia sarcoblasta (Broth.) Broth.
- Vesicularia scaturigina (Brid.) Broth.
- Vesicularia sigmangia (Broth.) Broth.
- Vesicularia sigmatellopsis Müll. Hal.
- Vesicularia slateri (Hampe) Broth.
- Vesicularia soyauxii (Müll. Hal.) Broth.
- Vesicularia sphaerocarpa (A. Jaeger) Broth.
- Vesicularia squamatifolia Müll. Hal.
- Vesicularia stillatitia Cardot
- Vesicularia stillicidiorum Broth.
- Vesicularia stramineola (Müll. Hal.) Müll. Hal.
- Vesicularia strephomischos (Welw. & Duby) Broth.
- Vesicularia subcalodictyon Broth. & Paris
- Vesicularia subchlorotica Broth.
- Vesicularia subdenticulata (Müll. Hal.) Broth.
- Vesicularia subenervis (Mitt.) Broth.
- Vesicularia subfuscescens (Broth. & Paris) Broth.
- Vesicularia subpilicuspis Cardot & P. de la Varde
- Vesicularia subsarcoblasta (Broth.) Broth.
- Vesicularia subscaturiginosa M. Fleisch.
- Vesicularia subsphaerica (Müll. Hal.) Broth.
- Vesicularia suburceolata (Hampe & Lorentz) Broth.
- Vesicularia succosa (Mitt.) Broth.
- Vesicularia surinamensis (Dozy & Molk.) Broth.
- Vesicularia tahitensis (Ångström) Broth.
- Vesicularia tenaci-inserta (Müll. Hal.) Broth.
- Vesicularia tenuatipes (Müll. Hal.) Broth.
- Vesicularia tepida M. Fleisch.
- Vesicularia terrestris (Müll. Hal.) Broth.
- Vesicularia thermalis Müll. Hal.
- Vesicularia thermophila M. Fleisch.
- Vesicularia thollonii (Besch.) Broth.
- Vesicularia tjibodensis M. Fleisch.
- Vesicularia tonkinensis (Besch.) Broth.
- Vesicularia tophacea Müll. Hal.
- Vesicularia trullifolia Müll. Hal.
- Vesicularia vesicularis (Schwägr.) Broth.
- Vesicularia vitiana Dixon
