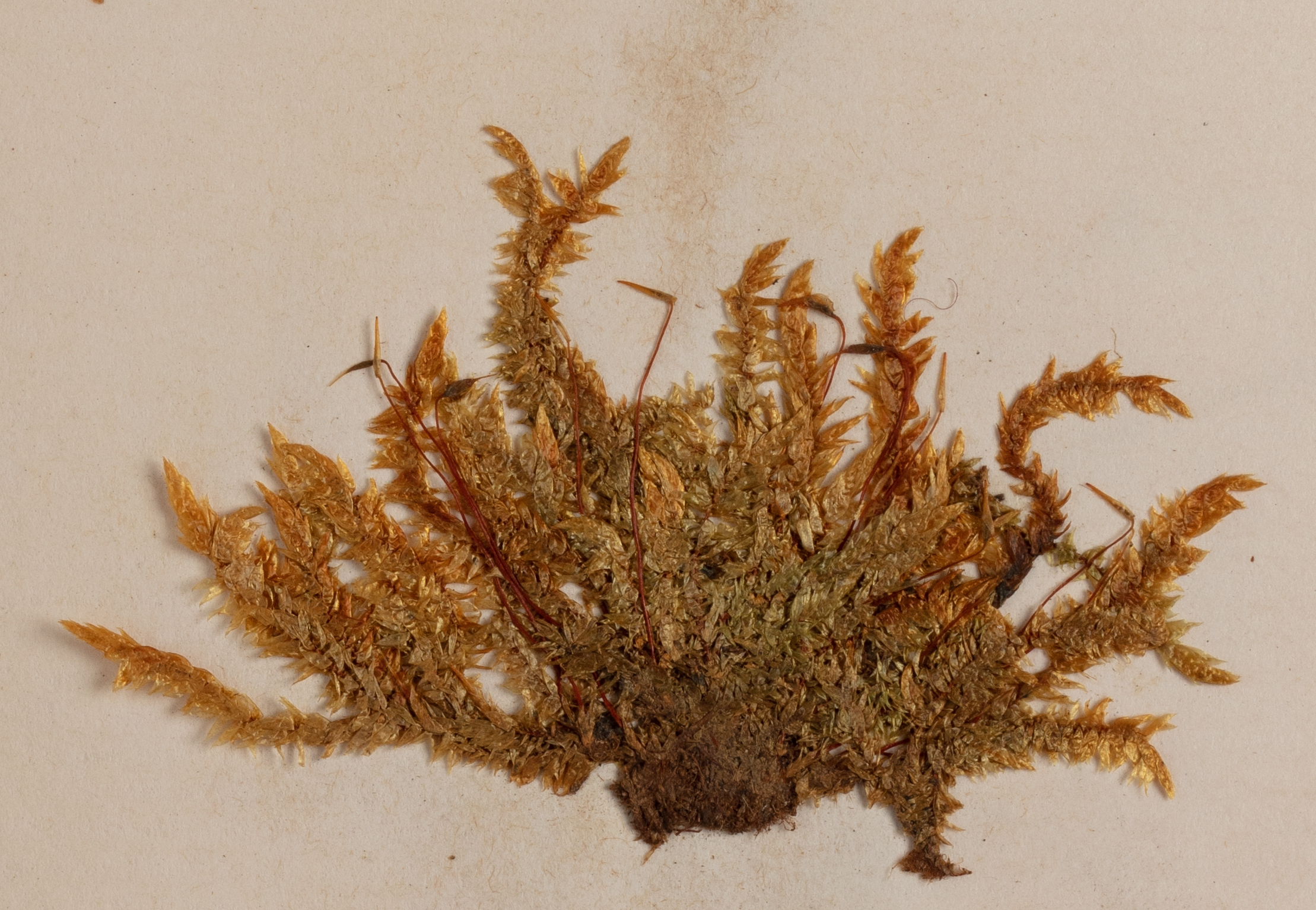
- Sematophyllum jolliffi

Scientific classification
- Kingdom: Plantae
- Division: Bryophyta
- Class: Bryopsida
- Subclass: Bryidae
- Order: Hypnales
- Family: Sematophyllaceae
- Genus: Sematophyllum; Mitt.

= Sematophyllum =

Type genus of mosses in Sematophyllaceae

Sematophyllum is the type genus of the family Sematophyllaceae. It contains about 170 species. Sematophyllum was described by William Mitten in 1864.

Sematophyllum demissum was designated as the type species by Max Fleischer in 1923.

== Etymology ==
The name is derived from 'semato', meaning "marked" and 'phyllon', meaning "leaf". The name refers to the enlarged alar cells that are characteristic of the genus.

== Morphology ==
Sematophyllum is often found in dense mats with creeping branches that are sparsely to freely-but-irregularly branched and densely foliate. Branch cross-section exhibits small, thick-walled cells surrounding larger thinner-walled cells with no central strand. Leaves are monomorphic between the stem and branch: arranged erect-spreading to homomallous to falcate-secund, lanceolate to ovate, acute to acuminate (rarely obtuse); margins are entire to serrulate distally and subentire proximally; costa absent or short and double. Laminal cells are rhomboidal to linear, smooth or rarely unipapillose, often becoming shorter in the apical region. Alar cells are enlarged and inflated, usually colored. Setae are smooth and usually reddish. Capsules are ovoid to short-cylindric with collenchymatous exothecial cells. Peristome is double, with triangular exostome teeth.

== Range ==
Sematophyllum has a cosmopolitan distribution, having been found on every continent except Antarctica.

== Position within the family ==
Sematophyllaceae is a monophyletic family within Hypnales with two phylogenetically supported subfamilies, Wijkioideae and Sematophylloideae. Sematophyllum has been described as the "dregs" of Sematophyllaceae, being "characterized by the lack of various specialized features." Many genera within Sematophyllaceae are paraphyletic, including Sematophyllum, and it is the subject of ongoing scholarship.
