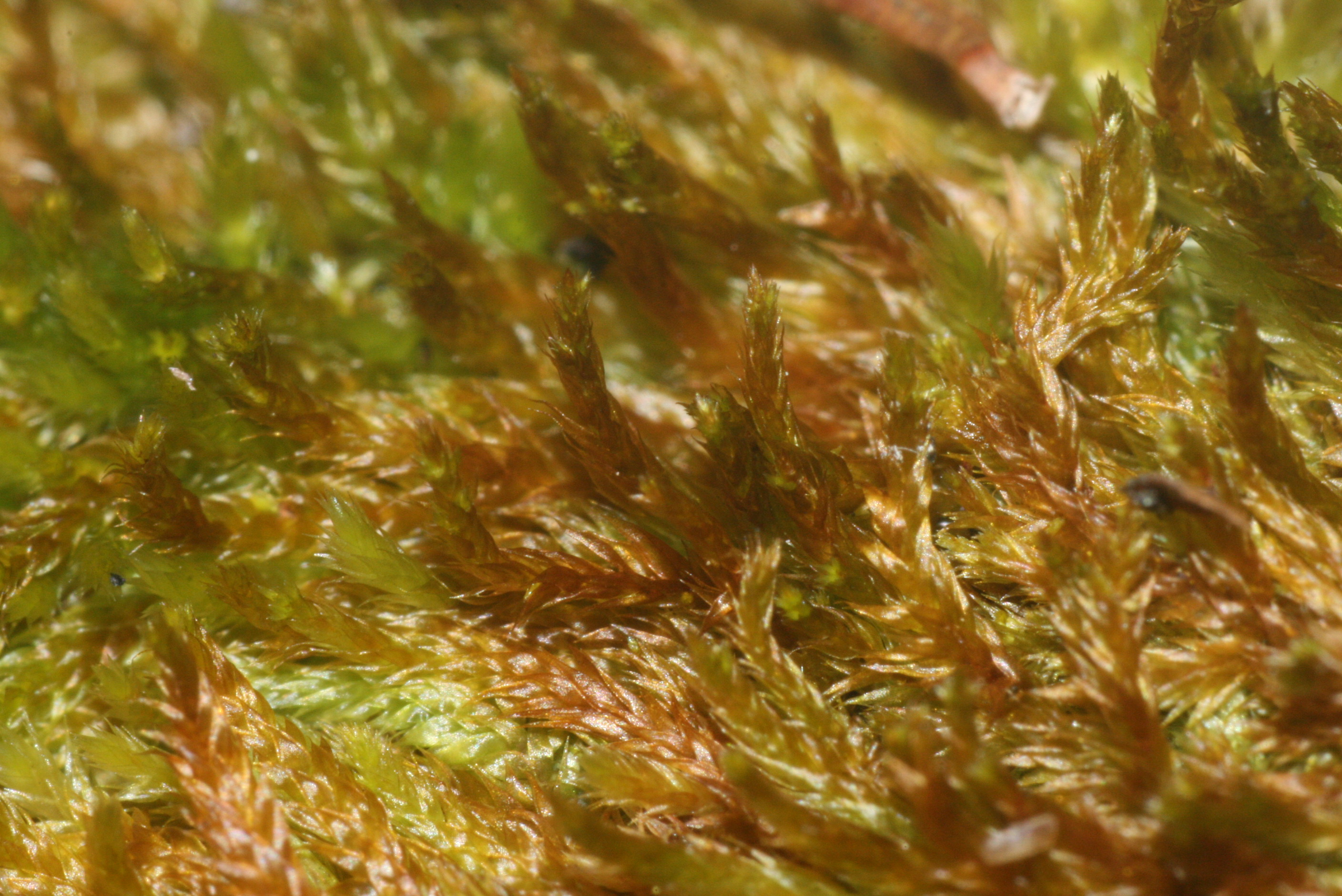
- Platygyrium repens

Scientific classification
- Kingdom: Plantae
- Division: Bryophyta
- Class: Bryopsida
- Subclass: Bryidae
- Order: Hypnales
- Family: Hypnaceae
- Genus: Platygyrium; Schimp.

= Platygyrium =

Genus of mosses

Platygyrium is a genus of mosses belonging to the family Hypnaceae.

The species of this genus are found in Eurasia and Northern America.

Species:

- Platygyrium amblyocarpum (Hampe) A.Jaeger
- Platygyrium australe (Dixon & Sainsbury) T.Arikawa
- Platygyrium brachycladon (Brid.) Kindb.
- Platygyrium decolor (Mitt.) Kindb.
- Platygyrium denticulifolium (Müll. Hal.)
- Platygyrium ferricola (Müll. Hal.) A. Jaeger
- Platygyrium fuscoluteum Cardot
- Platygyrium inflexum (Harv.) A. Jaeger
- Platygyrium intricatum (Hedw.) M. Fleisch.
- Platygyrium julaceum (Hook. ex Schwägr.) Bosch & Sande Lac.
- Platygyrium repens (Brid.) Schimp.
- Platygyrium russulum (Mitt.) A. Jaeger
- Platygyrium squarrosulum (Mont.) A. Jaeger
- Platygyrium subjulaceum (Müll. Hal.) A. Jaeger
- Platygyrium subrussulum Renauld & Cardot
- Platygyrium ussuriense Dixon & Lazarenko
