= Taxitheliella =

Scientific classification
- Kingdom: Plantae
- Division: Bryophyta
- Class: Bryopsida
- Subclass: Bryidae
- Order: Hypnales
- Family: Pylaisiadelphaceae
- Genus: Taxitheliella; Goffinet & W.R. Buck
- Species: T. richardsii

Binomial name
- Taxitheliella richardsii Dixon

Genus of mosses

Taxitheliella is a genus of mosses in family Pylaisadelphaceae. It is monotypic, containing the single species, Taxitheliella richardsii.
