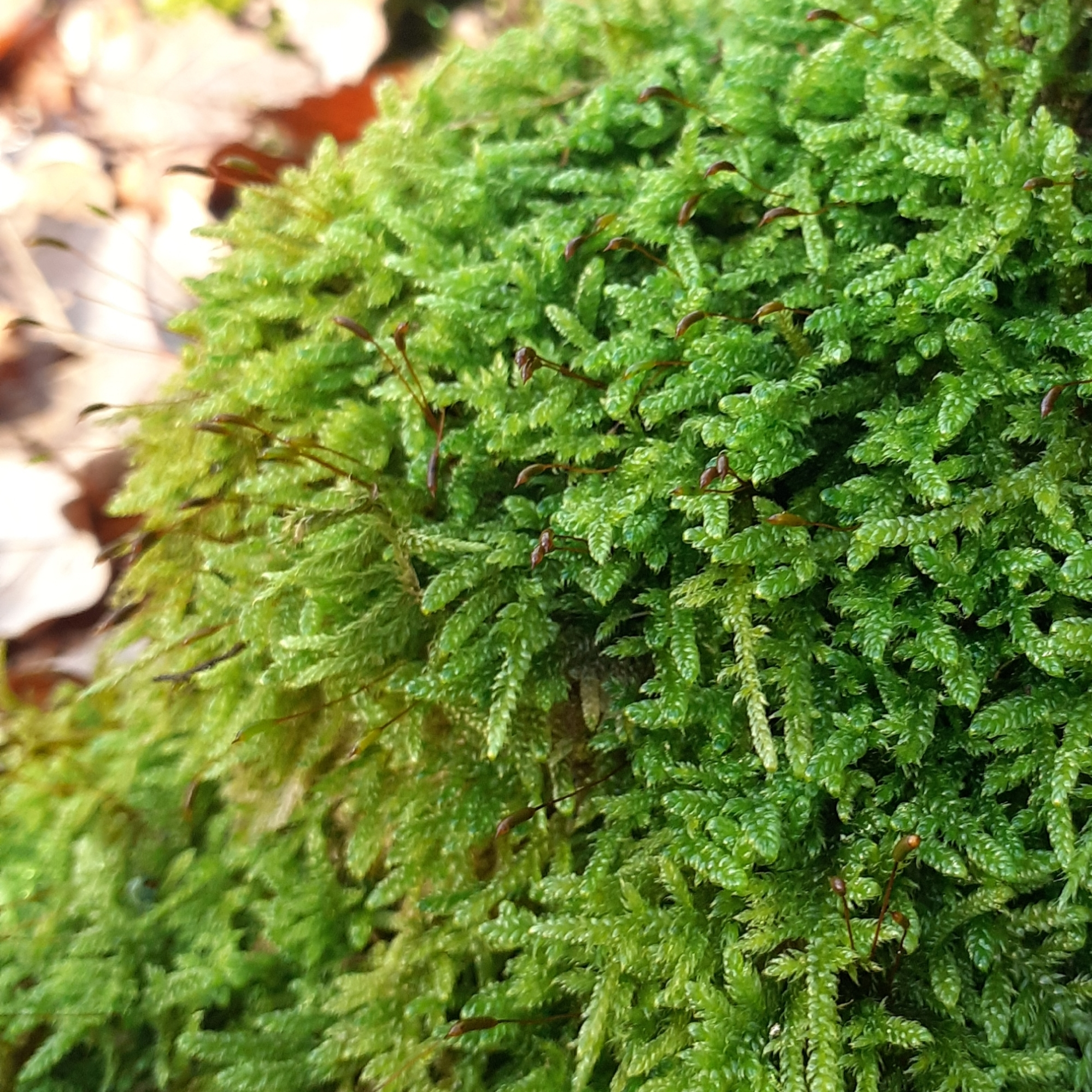
- Hypnum cupressiforme

Scientific classification
- Kingdom: Plantae
- Clade: Embryophytes
- Division: Bryophyta
- Class: Bryopsida
- Subclass: Bryidae
- Order: Hypnales
- Family: Hypnaceae
- Genus: Hypnum; Hedw.

= Hypnum =

Genus of mosses

Hypnum is a genus of mosses belonging to the family Hypnaceae.

The genus has cosmopolitan distribution. A common name sometimes used for Hypnum moss is "carpet moss".

== Distribution ==
Hypnum species are found on all continents except for Antarctica. Species are typically found in temperate regions.

== Habitat ==
Hypnum species are typically found in moist forest areas on rotting logs, while some species are aquatic. Species can also be found living on soil, rocks, and live trees.

== Identification ==
Identifying moss species in the field to the genus Hypnum by using a hand lens is considered quite feasible since most Hypnum species share common features with one another. A very useful defining characteristic of Hypnum mosses are their leaves which are often falcate-secund (meaning that they are sickle-shaped and point to one side of the plant). Another distinguishing characteristic of Hypnum mosses is the thick, green mats that they form, which earns them the common name "carpet moss". Distinguishing between different Hypnum species can be accomplished mainly by gametophytic features and sometimes by sporophytic features.

== Description ==
=== Gametophyte characteristics ===
==== General form ====
Gametophytes range from small to large in size. Gametophytes are green, yellowish, or brown in colour, with the colouration appearing dull or glossy. Gametophytes can sometimes form tufts. Growth forms of Hypnum mosses vary from creeping to erect.

==== Stem and branching patterns ====
Stems have pseudoparaphyllia. Branching patterns include nearly unbranched, irregularly branched, or 1- or 2- times pinnate.

==== Leaves ====
Branch leaves and stem leaves have similar shapes. Leaves are secund or falcate-secund, broadly to narrowly ovate, and can be plicate. Leaf bases can sometimes be decurrent. Sometimes leaf margins are toothed on the distal region. Leaf margins can be recurved proximally and are usually flat (i.e., not recurved) at the distal edge. Leaf margins can sometimes be sinuate at the proximal region. Leaf apices are either acute or acuminate.

Despite having similar shapes, branch leaves are smaller than stem leaves.

Leaves have a double costa or an obscure costa that spans 1/4 of the leaf's length. Laminal cells are exclusively smooth. Alar cells in the leaf bases are typically differentiated and range in shape from hexagonal, triangular, quadrate, or sub-quadrate.

The outer perichaetial leaves are bent while the inner perichaetial leaves are erect. In terms of shape, perichaetial leaves can be ovate, lanceolate, or subulate. Apices of perichaetial leaves are acuminate.

==== Calyptra ====
Calyptra are exclusively naked and have no hair.

=== Sporophyte characteristics ===
==== Seta ====
Setae are long and range in colour from yellowish to reddish.

==== Sporangium ====
Orientation of the sporangium can be erect, inclined, or horizontal. Sporangium shape varies from cylindrical to ovoid. The sporangium is also typically curved. There tends to be a contraction below the sporangium opening. All species have two rows of peristome teeth. The outer surface of exostome teeth have zigzag lines as well as lamellae. The annulus is either 1-3- times seriate or has very minimal amounts of cell differentiation. The operculum is conical to round in shape.

Spores produced by the sporangium are round and can be smooth or papillose in texture.

== Reproduction ==
In terms of sexual reproduction, Hypnum mosses are autoicous, dioicous, or phyllodioicous. Hypnum mosses do not have any specialized forms of asexual reproduction.

== Human use ==
Historically, Hypnum mosses were used to stuff bedding because they were falsely believed to have sleep-inducing properties.

Hypnum curvifolium, commonly known as "sheet moss", is used by some florists.

The CityTree air filter, present in many European cities, uses Hypnum to capture and consume pollutants.

== Species ==
The number of species in the genus is unresolved. Depending on the source, the number of species ranges from around 50 to 220, or (according to GBIF) up to 773.

Some of the species in the genus are:

- Hypnum acanthoneuron Schwägr.
- Hypnum acanthophyllum Mont.
- Hypnum circinale Hook.
- Hypnum crispifolium Hook.
- Hypnum cupressiforme Hedw.
- Hypnum curvifolium Hedw.
- Hypnum involuta (Hedw.) P.Beauv.

== Former species ==
- H. leptothallum (Müll.Hal.) Paris, now a synonym of Eurohypnum leptothallum Ando, 1966
