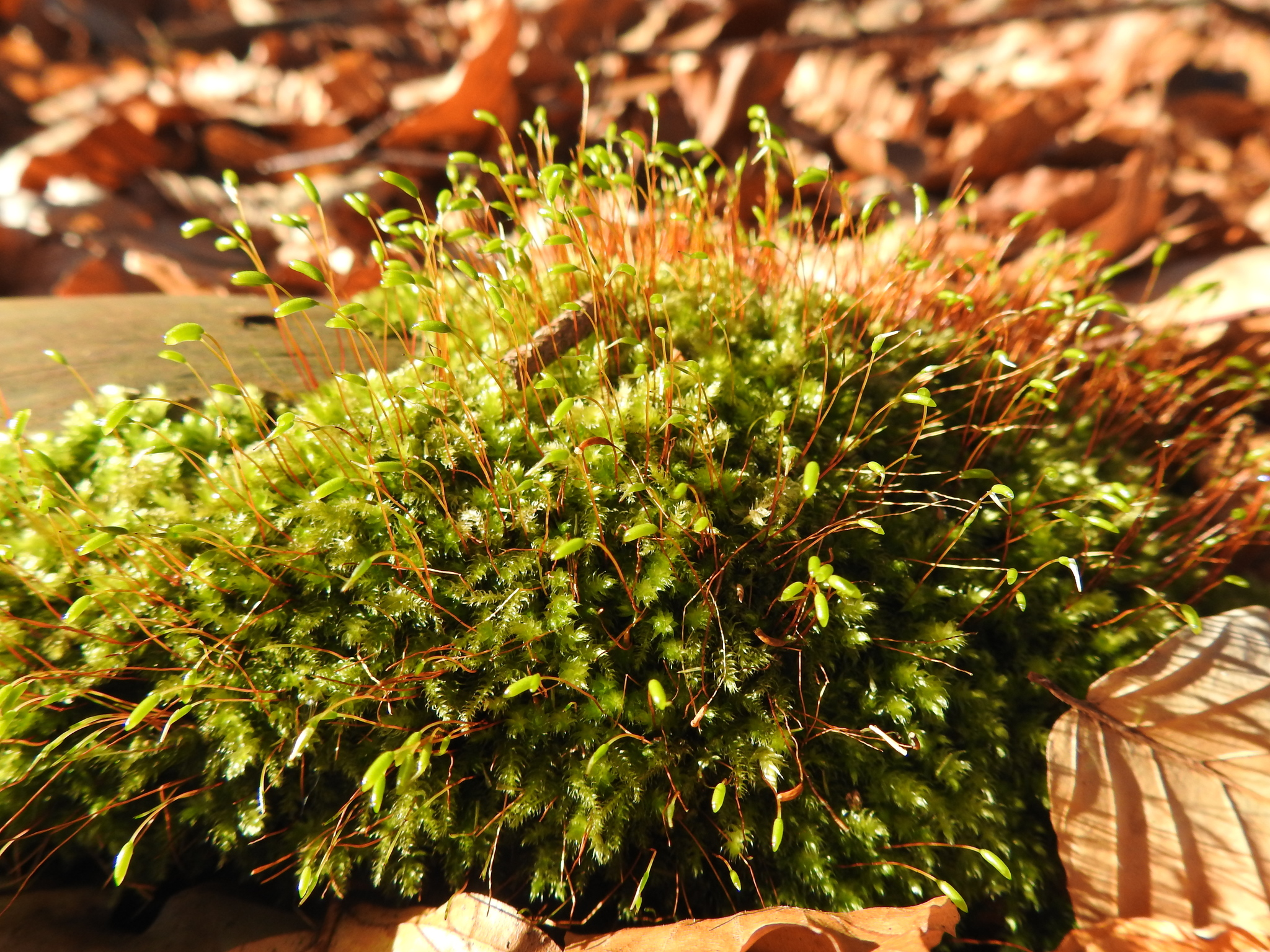
- Herzogiella seligeri

Scientific classification
- Kingdom: Plantae
- Clade: Embryophytes
- Division: Bryophyta
- Class: Bryopsida
- Subclass: Bryidae
- Order: Hypnales
- Family: Plagiotheciaceae
- Genus: Herzogiella; Broth.

Synonyms
- Sharpiella Z. Iwats.

= Herzogiella =

Genus of mosses

Herzogiella is a genus of mosses belonging to the family Hypnaceae.

The genus name of Herzogiella is in honour of Theodor Carl Julius Herzog (1880– 1961), who was a German bryologist and phytogeographer.

The genus was circumscribed by Viktor Ferdinand Brotherus in Nat. Pflanzenfam. ed.2, vol.11 on page 466 in 1925.

The genus has almost cosmopolitan distribution.

Species:

- Herzogiella adscendens Iwatsuki & W.B.Schofield, 1973
- Herzogiella boliviana Fleischer, 1925
- Herzogiella cylindricarpa (Cardot) Z. Iwats.
- Herzogiella letestui (Dixon & P. de la Varde) Ando
- Herzogiella perrobusta (Broth.) Z. Iwats.
- Herzogiella renitens (Mitt.) Z. Iwats.
- Herzogiella seligeri (Brid.) Z. Iwats.
- Herzogiella striatella (Brid.) Z. Iwats.
- Herzogiella turfacea (Lindb.) Z. Iwats.
