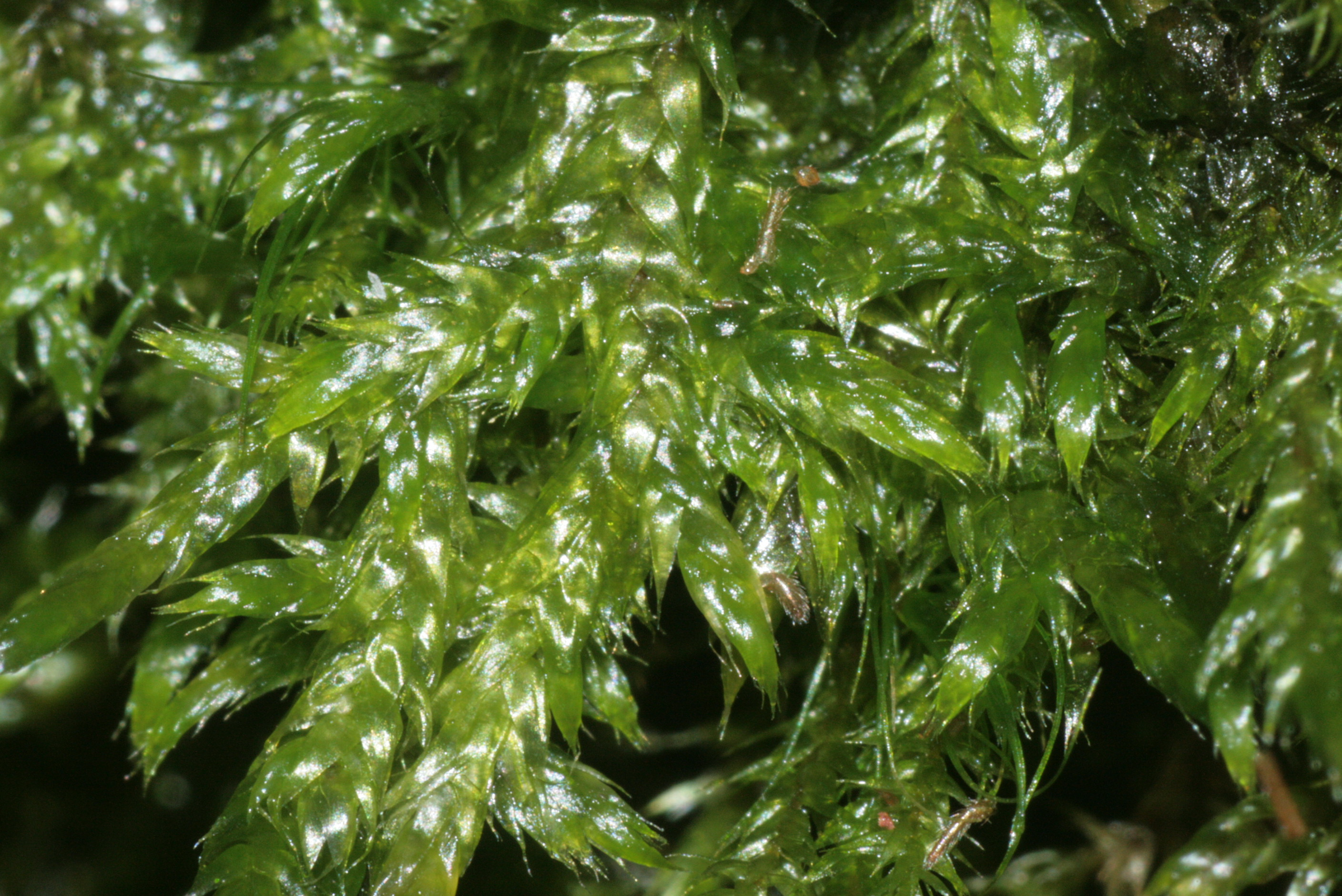
- Brotherella lorentziana

Scientific classification
- Kingdom: Plantae
- Clade: Embryophytes
- Division: Bryophyta
- Class: Bryopsida
- Subclass: Bryidae
- Order: Hypnales
- Family: Sematophyllaceae; Broth.

Genera
- About 40, see text

= Sematophyllaceae =

Family of mosses

Sematophyllaceae is a family of mosses, known commonly as signal mosses. They grow on rocks in wet or humid places. and are found nearly worldwide, especially in tropical and temperate regions. There are about 150 species, which form yellow to yellow-green mats with reddish stems.

== Genera ==
The family Sematophyllaceae contains the following genera:

- Acanthorrhynchium M. Fleisch.
- †Acroporiites J.-P. Frahm
- Acroporium Mitt.
- Allioniellopsis Ochyra
- Aptychopsis (Broth.) M. Fleisch.
- Billbuckia Pócs
- Brittonodoxa W.R. Buck, P.E.A.S. Câmara & Carv.-Silva
- Chionostomum Müll. Hal.
- Clastobryophilum M. Fleisch.
- Clastobryopsis M. Fleisch.
- Colobodontium Herzog
- Donnellia Austin
- Hydropogon Brid.
- Hydropogonella Cardot
- Jirivanaea U.B. Deshmukh & Rathor
- Kuerschneria Ochyra & Bedn.-Ochyra
- Macrohymenium Müll. Hal.
- Meiotheciella B.C. Tan, W.B. Schofield & H.P. Ramsay
- Meiotheciopsis Broth.
- Meiothecium Mitt.
- Microcalpe (Mitt.) W.R. Buck
- Papillidiopsis (Broth.) W.R. Buck & B.C. Tan
- Piloecium (Müll. Hal.) Broth.
- Pilosimitra B.C. Tan & G. Dauphin
- Pseudopiloecium E.B. Bartram
- Pterogoniopsis Müll. Hal.
- Radulina W.R. Buck & B.C. Tan
- Rhaphidorrhynchium Besch. ex M. Fleisch.
- Rhaphidostegium (Schimp.) De Not.
- Rhaphidostichum M. Fleisch.
- Schraderella Müll. Hal.
- Schroeterella Herzog
- †Sematophyllites J.-P. Frahm
- Sematophyllum Mitt.
- Timotimius W.R. Buck
- Trichosteleum Mitt.
- Warburgiella Müll. Hal.

=== Formerly included ===
- Clastobryella M. Fleisch. (synonym of Clastobryum)
- Paranapiacabaea W.R. Buck & Vital (synonym of Pterogoniopsis)
- Potamium Mitt. (synonym of Trichosteleum)
- Trolliella (synonym of Pylaisia)
- Vitalia P.E.A.S.Câmara, Carv.-Silva & W.R. Buck (synonym of Jirivanaea)
