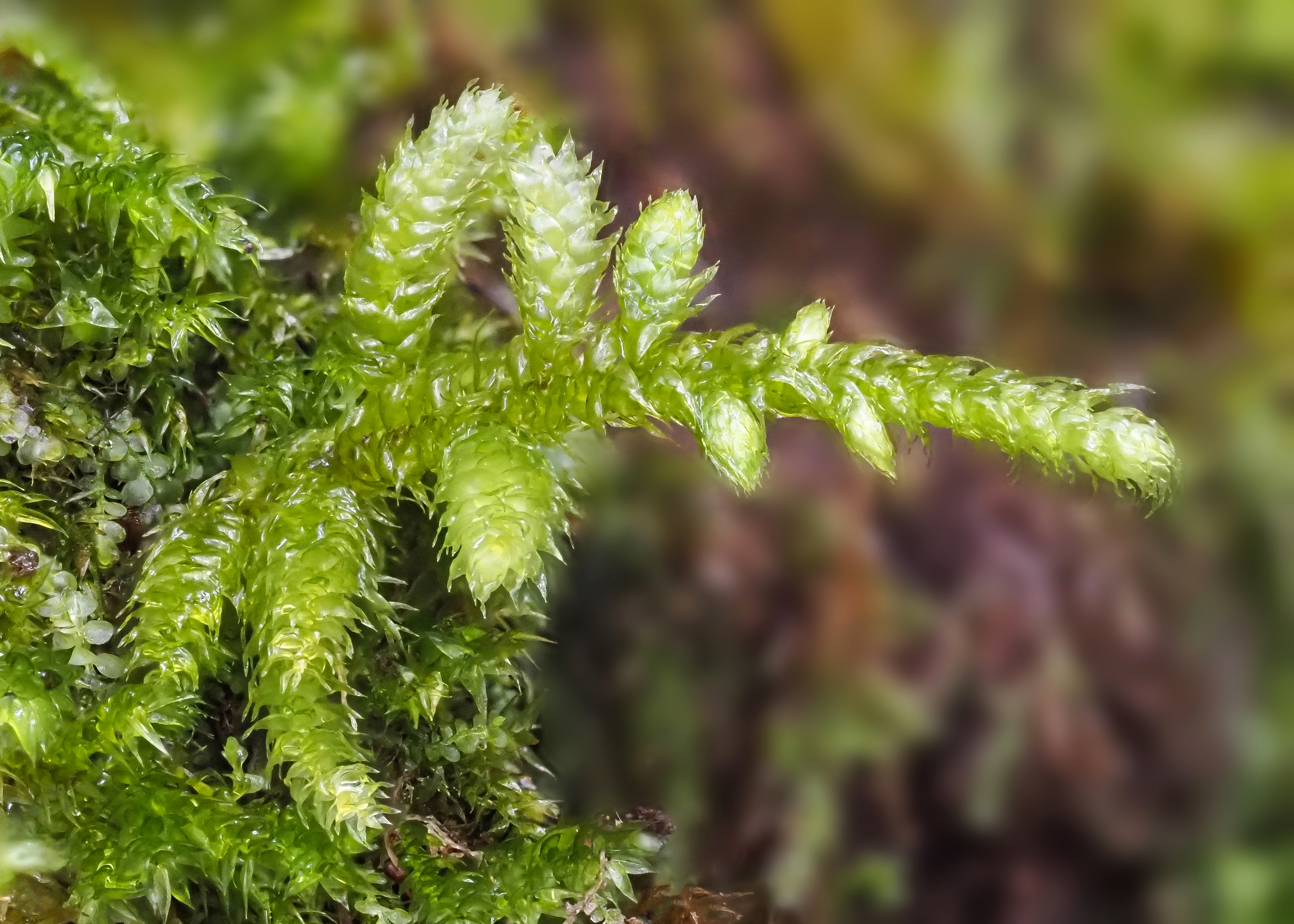
- Andoa berthelotiana

Scientific classification
- Kingdom: Plantae
- Clade: Embryophytes
- Division: Bryophyta
- Class: Bryopsida
- Subclass: Bryidae
- Order: Hypnales
- Family: Hypnaceae
- Genus: Andoa; R.Ochyra

= Andoa (plant) =

Genus of mosses

Andoa is a genus of mosses belonging to the family Hypnaceae.

The species of this genus are found in Southwestern Europe.

Species:

- Andoa berthelotiana Ochyra, 1982
