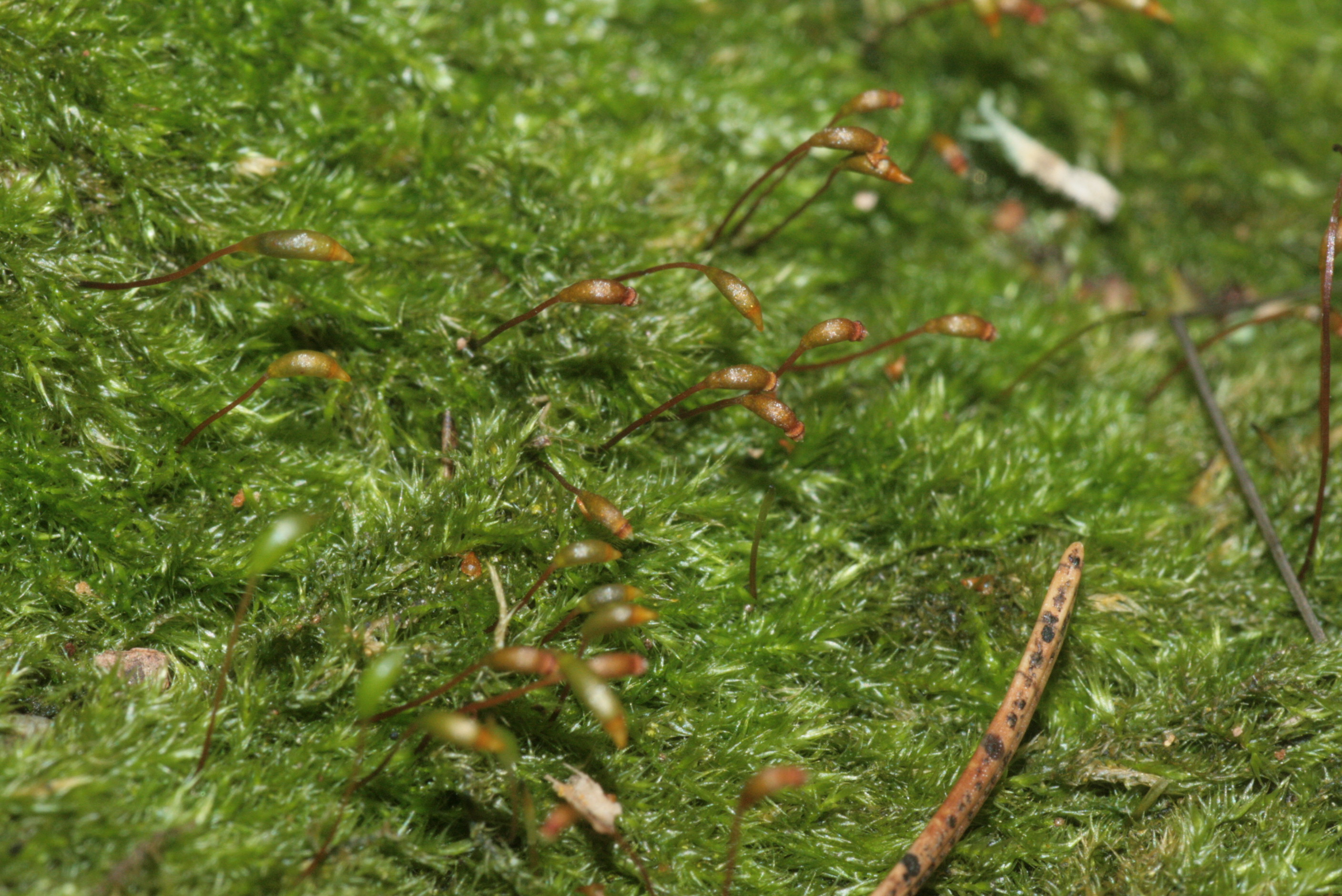
- Homomallium incurvatum

Scientific classification
- Kingdom: Plantae
- Division: Bryophyta
- Class: Bryopsida
- Subclass: Bryidae
- Order: Hypnales
- Family: Pylaisiaceae
- Genus: Homomallium (Schimp.) Loeske

= Homomallium =

Genus of mosses

Homomallium is a genus of moss belonging to the family Pylaisiaceae.

The genus was first described by Wilhelm Philippe Schimper.

The genus has cosmopolitan distribution.

Species include:

- Homomallium adnatum (Hedw.) Broth.
- Homomallium andoi Higuchi, N.Nishim. & S.Inoue
- Homomallium connexum (Cardot) Broth.
- Homomallium gollanii Broth. ex Ando
- Homomallium homalostegium (Müll.Hal.) Paris
- Homomallium incurvatum (Schrad. ex Brid.) Loeske
- Homomallium japonicoadnatum (Broth.) Broth.
- Homomallium mexicanum Cardot
- Homomallium plagiangium (Müll.Hal.) Broth.
- Homomallium simlaense (Mitt.) Broth.
- Homomallium yuennanense Broth.
