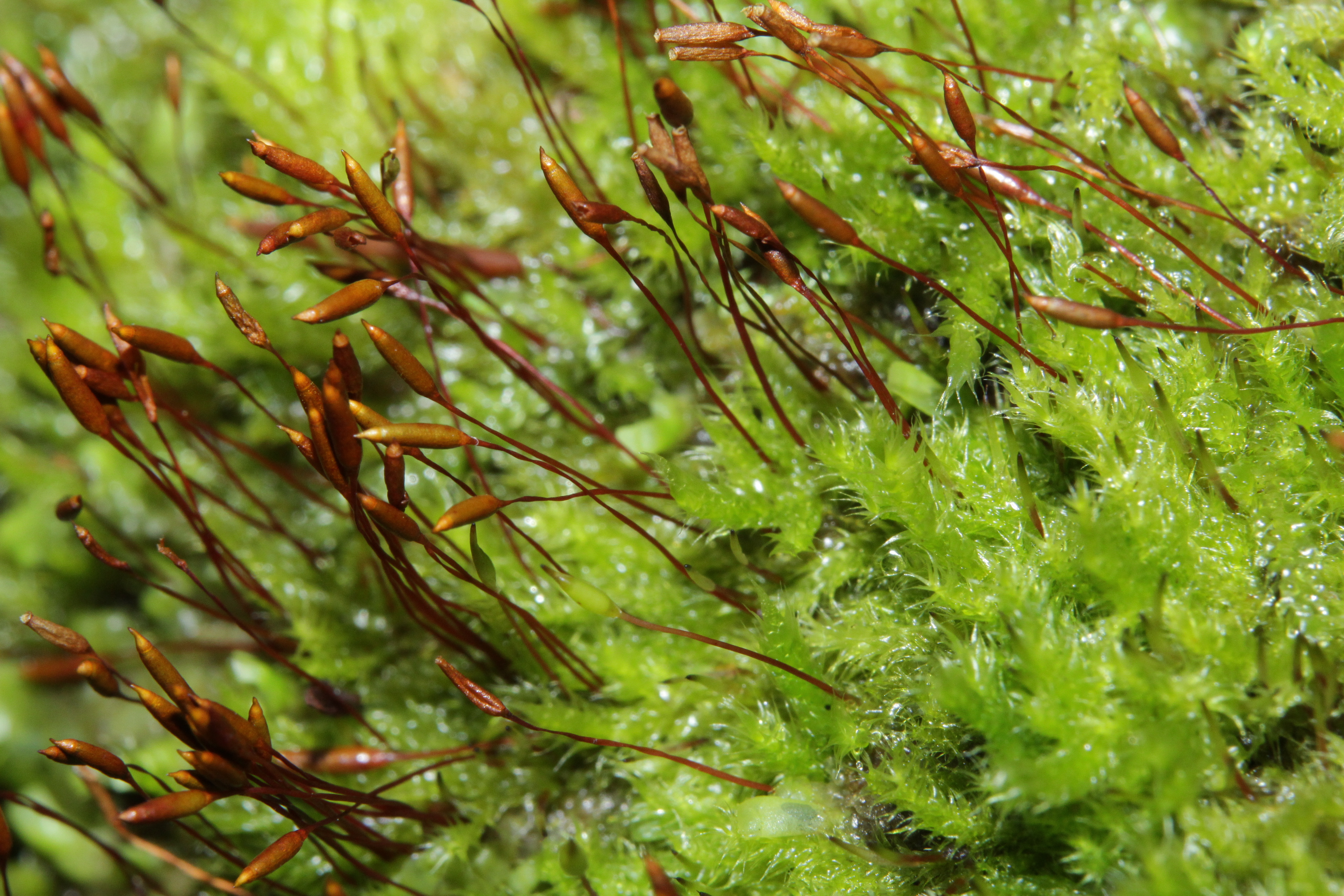
- Pylaisia polyantha

Scientific classification
- Kingdom: Plantae
- Division: Bryophyta
- Class: Bryopsida
- Subclass: Bryidae
- Order: Hypnales
- Family: Pylaisiaceae
- Genus: Pylaisia; Bruch & Schimp.

= Pylaisia =

Genus of mosses

Pylaisia is a genus of mosses belonging to the family Pylaisiaceae.

The genus has cosmopolitan distribution.

Species:

- Pylaisia alpicola (Lindb. ex Lindb. & Arnell) Limpr.
- Pylaisia appressifolia Thér. & Dixon
- Pylaisia australis Dixon & Sainsbury
- Pylaisia bollei De Not.
- Pylaisia brevirostris (Griff.) A. Jaeger
- Pylaisia brotheri Besch.
- Pylaisia buckii T.Y. Chiang & Lin, Chi-Yung
- Pylaisia camurifolia (Mitt.) A. Jaeger
- Pylaisia capillacea (Griff.) A. Jaeger
- Pylaisia chrysea (Schwägr.) Venturi & Bott.
- Pylaisia complanatula Müll. Hal.
- Pylaisia condensata (Mitt.) A. Jaeger
- Pylaisia coreana Nog.
- Pylaisia coreensis (Cardot) Toyama
- Pylaisia cristata Cardot
- Pylaisia curviramea Dixon
- Pylaisia decolor (Mitt.) A. Jaeger
- Pylaisia erectiuscula (Sull. & Lesq.) Mitt.
- Pylaisia extenta (Mitt.) A. Jaeger
- Pylaisia falcata Schimp.
- Pylaisia frahmii (W.R. Buck) Ochyra
- Pylaisia hamata (Mitt.) Cardot
- Pylaisia homomalla (Hampe) A. Jaeger
- Pylaisia intricata (Hedw.) Schimp.
- Pylaisia kunisawae (Ando) Ochyra
- Pylaisia latifolia Dixon
- Pylaisia leptoclada Renauld & Cardot
- Pylaisia levieri (Müll. Hal.) T. Arikawa
- Pylaisia macrotis Cardot
- Pylaisia nana Mitt.
- Pylaisia obtusa Lindb.
- Pylaisia plagiangia Müll. Hal.
- Pylaisia polyantha (Hedw.) Schimp.
- Pylaisia pseudoplatygyrium Kindb.
- Pylaisia robusta Broth. & Paris
- Pylaisia rufescens (Dicks. ex Brid.) De Not.
- Pylaisia selwynii Kindb.
- Pylaisia sericea De Not.
- Pylaisia simlaensis (Mitt.) A. Jaeger
- Pylaisia steerei (Ando & Higuchi) Ignatov
- Pylaisia subcircinata Cardot
- Pylaisia subdenticulata Schimp.
- Pylaisia subhomomalla (Müll. Hal.) A. Jaeger
- Pylaisia subimbricata Broth. & Paris
- Pylaisia tenuirostris (Bruch & Schimp. ex Sull.) A. Jaeger
