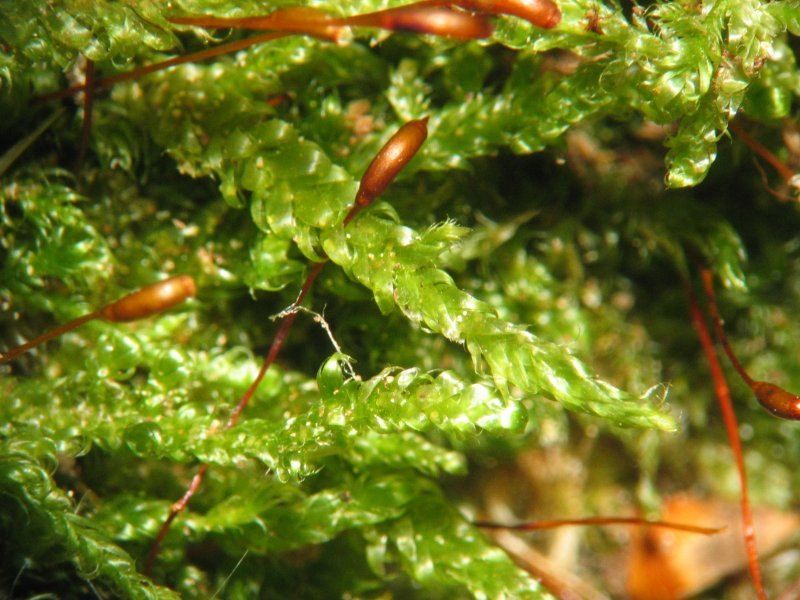
- Hypnum cupressiforme

Scientific classification
- Kingdom: Plantae
- Division: Bryophyta
- Class: Bryopsida
- Subclass: Bryidae
- Order: Hypnales
- Family: Hypnaceae; Schimp.

Genera
- See Classification

= Hypnaceae =

Family of mosses

Hypnaceae is a large family of moss with broad worldwide occurrence in the class Bryopsida, subclass Bryidae and order Hypnales. Genera include Hypnum, Phyllodon, and Taxiphyllum.

== Ecology ==
Some of the family species occur on the floor of Canadian boreal forests; an example of this occurrence is within the black spruce/feathermoss climax forest, often having moderately dense canopy and featuring a forest floor of feathermosses including, Hylocomium splendens, Pleurozium schreberi and Ptilium crista-castrensis.

== Classification ==
The family Hypanaceae includes the following genera:

- Acritodon H. Rob.
- Austrohondaella Z.Iwats., H.P.Ramsay & Fife
- Bryosedgwickia Tosco & Piovano
- Chryso-hypnum Hampe
- Crepidophyllum Herzog
- Ctenidiadelphus M. Fleisch.
- Cyathothecium Dixon
- Dacryophyllum Ireland
- Ectropotheciella M. Fleisch.
- Ectropotheciopsis (Broth.) M. Fleisch.
- Ectropothecium Mitt.
- Elharveya H.A. Crum
- Elmeriobryum Broth.
- Entodontella Broth. ex M. Fleisch.
- Eurohypnum Ando
- Foreauella Dixon & P. de la Varde
- Glossadelphus M. Fleisch.
- Gollania Broth.
- Hypnum Hedw.
- Irelandia W. R. Buck
- Karstia B.H. Allen
- Leiodontium Broth.
- Leptoischyrodon Dixon
- Macrothamniella M. Fleisch.
- Mahua W.R. Buck
- Microctenidium M. Fleisch.
- Microthamnium A. Jaeger
- Mittenothamnium Henn.
- Nanothecium Dixon & P. de la Varde
- Neoptychophyllum S. He
- Plagiotheciopsis Broth.
- Platygyriella Cardot
- Podperaea Z. Iwats. & Glime
- Pseudohypnella (Broth.) M. Fleisch.
- Rhacopilopsis Renauld & Cardot
- Rhizohypnella M. Fleisch.
- Sclerohypnum Dixon
- Stenotheciopsis Broth.
- Stereodontopsis R. S. Williams
- Syringothecium Mitt.
- Taxiphyllopsis Higuchi & Deguchi
- Vesicularia (Müll. Hal.) Müll. Hal.
- Wijkiella Bizot & Lewinsky

=== Formerly included ===
- Acosta (Schwägr.) Müll. Hal. – synonym of Sematophyllum
- Allorgea (Mont.) Ando – synonym of Andoa
- Andoa Ochyra – now in Myuriaceae
- Breidleria Loeske – synonym of Stereodon
- Bryocrumia L. E. Anderson – now in Symphyodontaceae
- Buckiella Ireland – synonym of Plagiothecium
- Callicladium H. Crum – now in Callicladiaceae
- Campylophyllum (Schimp.) M. Fleisch. – now in Amblystegiaceae
- Caribaeohypnum Ando & Higuchi – now in Taxiphyllaceae
- Ctenidium (Schimp.) Mitt. – now in Myuriaceae
- Cupressina (Mitt.) Müll. Hal. – synonym of Hypnum
- Dolichotheca (Broth.) Broth. – synonym of Herzogiella
- Drepanium G. Roth – now in Amblystegiaceae
- Filibryum W. Kim & T. Yamag. – now in Taxiphyllaceae
- Giraldiella Müll. Hal. – synonym of Pylaisia
- Herzogiella Broth. – now in Plagiotheciaceae
- Homomallium (Schimp.) Loeske – now in Pylaisiaceae
- Hondaella Dixon & Sakurai – now in Taxiphyllaceae
- Hyocomium Bruch & Schimp. – now in Myuriaceae
- Isopterygium Mitt. – now in Pylaisiadelphaceae
- Orthotheciadelphus Dixon – synonym of Orthothecium
- Orthothecium Schimp. – now in Plagiotheciaceae
- Phyllodon Bruch & Schimp. – now in Symphyodontaceae
- Platygyrium Schimp. – now in Pylaisiadelphaceae
- Ptilium De Not. – now in Pylaisiaceae
- Puiggariella Broth. – synonym of Puiggariopsis
- Puiggariopsis M. Menzel – now in Hylocomiaceae
- Pylaisia Schimp. – now in Pylaisiaceae
- Pylaisaea Müll. Hal. – synonym of Pylaisia
- Rhizohypnum Herzog – synonym of Mittenothamnium
- Taxiphyllum M. Fleisch. – now in Taxiphyllaceae
- Trachythecium M. Fleisch. – now in Symphyodontaceae
- Tutigaea Ando 1958 – synonym of Hondaella

== See also ==
- Feathermoss
