= Platygyriella =

Scientific classification
- Kingdom: Plantae
- Division: Bryophyta
- Class: Bryopsida
- Subclass: Bryidae
- Order: Hypnales
- Family: Hypnaceae
- Genus: Platygyriella; Cardot

Species
- Species

Genus of moss

Platygyriella is a genus of moss in the family Hypnaceae. It was described by Jules Cardot in 1854. It occurs mostly in the Americas (especially Mexico), parts of Africa, and parts of Asia.

== Species ==
It has a total of 9 species:

- Platygyriella aurea (Schwägr.) W.R. Buck
- Platygyriella aureoides (Broth. & Paris) W.R. Buck
- Platygyriella densa (Hook.) W.R. Buck
- Platygyriella fragilifolia (Dixon) W.R. Buck
- Platygyriella frahmii (W.R. Buck) T. Arikawa
- Platygyriella imbricatifolia (R.S. Williams ex Cardot) Thér.
- Platygyriella jamaicensis E.B. Bartram
- Platygyriella kirtikarii (Cardot & Dixon) W.R. Buck
- Platygyriella pringlei (Cardot) W.R. Buck
