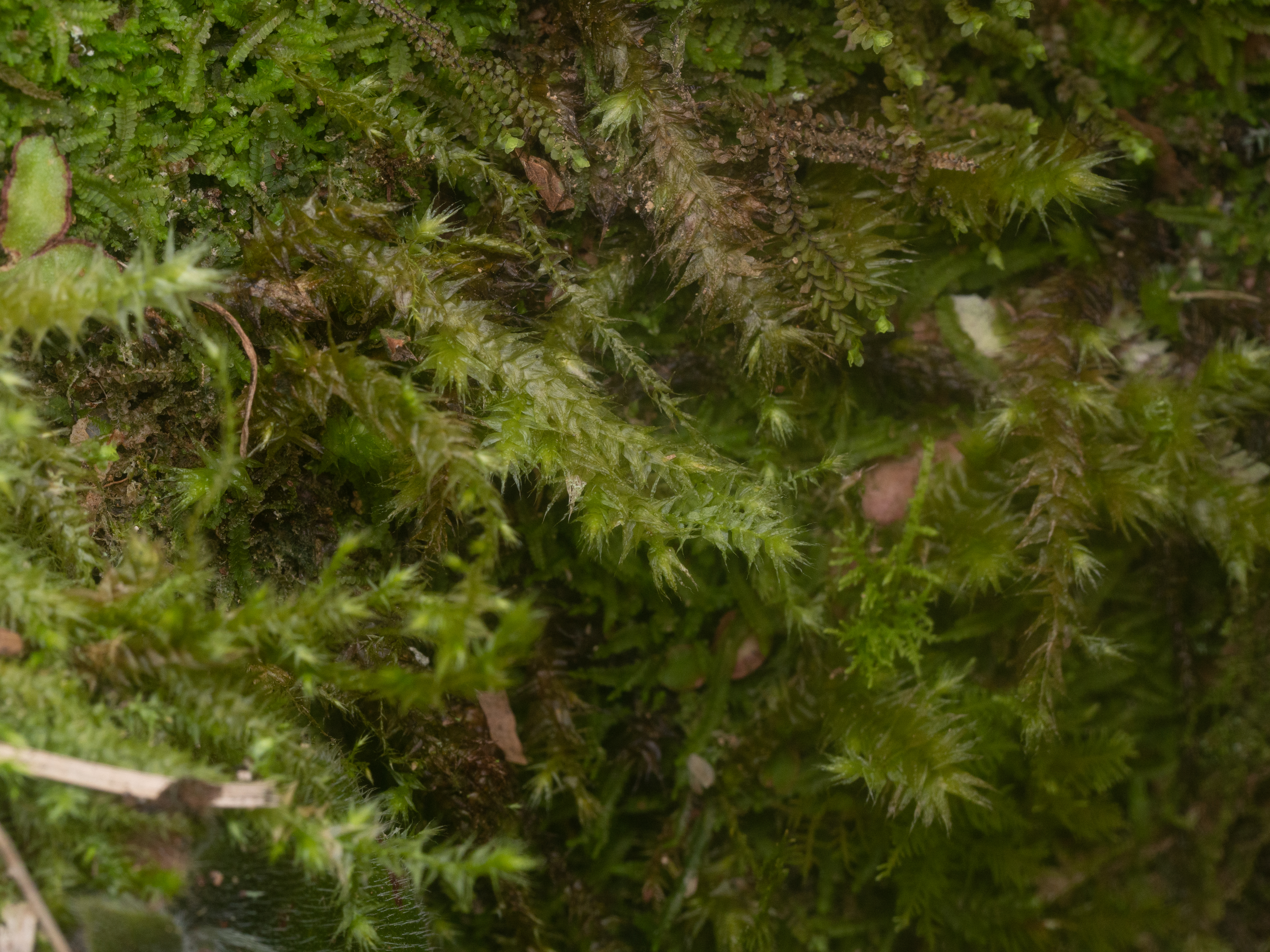

Scientific classification
- Kingdom: Plantae
- Division: Bryophyta
- Class: Bryopsida
- Subclass: Bryidae
- Order: Hypnales
- Family: Sematophyllaceae
- Genus: Acroporium; Mitt.

Diversity
- 64 species, see text

= Acroporium =

Genus of mosses

Acroporium is a genus of mosses in the family Sematophyllaceae.

== Species ==
This genus includes the following species:

- Acroporium aciphyllum Dixon
- Acroporium adspersum (Hampe) Broth.
- Acroporium affine Broth.
- Acroporium angustum (Broth.) Broth.
- Acroporium baviense (Besch.) Broth.
- Acroporium brevicuspidatum Mitt.
- Acroporium capillarisetum (Paris) Broth.
- Acroporium cataractarum Baumgartner & J.Froehl.
- Acroporium ceylonense Dixon
- Acroporium condensatum E.B.Bartram
- Acroporium consanguineum (Broth.) M.Fleisch.
- Acroporium convolutifolium Dixon
- Acroporium convolutum (Sande Lac.) M.Fleisch.
- Acroporium denticulatum Dixon
- Acroporium depressum Thér.
- Acroporium dicranoides M.Fleisch.
- Acroporium diminutum (Brid.) M.Fleisch.
- Acroporium dixonii Tixier
- Acroporium downii (Dixon) Broth.
- Acroporium eburense Bizot
- Acroporium flexisetum (Thér.) Broth.
- Acroporium fuscoflavum (Paris) Broth.
- Acroporium gracilescens (Broth.) Broth.
- Acroporium gracillimum (Thér.) Broth.
- Acroporium hermaphroditum (Müll.Hal.) M.Fleisch.
- Acroporium hyalinum (Reinw. ex Schwägr.) Mitt.
- Acroporium incrassatum Dixon & Thér.
- Acroporium johannis-winkleri Broth.
- Acroporium laevifolium (Renauld) Broth.
- Acroporium lamprophyllum Mitt.
- Acroporium laosianum (Paris & Broth.) Broth.
- Acroporium letestui P.de la Varde
- Acroporium longicaule (Sande Lac.) M.Fleisch.
- Acroporium longirostrum (Brid.) W.R.Buck
- Acroporium macrorhynchum Mitt.
- Acroporium macroturgidum Dixon
- Acroporium megasporum (Duby) M.Fleisch.
- Acroporium microcladon (Dozy & Molk.) B.C.Tan
- Acroporium microthecium (Broth. & Paris) Broth.
- Acroporium nietnerianum (Müll.Hal.) Broth.
- Acroporium perserratum E.B.Bartram
- Acroporium plicatum E.B.Bartram
- Acroporium pocsii Bizot
- Acroporium praelongum Dixon
- Acroporium prionophylax W.R.Buck
- Acroporium procerum (Müll.Hal.) M.Fleisch.
- Acroporium procumbens (Broth. & Paris) Broth.
- Acroporium pungens (Hedw.) Broth.
- Acroporium ramicola (Hampe) Broth.
- Acroporium ramuligerum Dixon
- Acroporium rhaphidostegioides Dixon
- Acroporium ridleyi Dixon
- Acroporium rigens (Broth. ex Dixon) Dixon
- Acroporium rufum (Reinw. & Hornsch.) M.Fleisch.
- Acroporium savesianum Tixier
- Acroporium secundum (Reinw. & Hornsch.) M.Fleisch.
- Acroporium seriatum E.B.Bartram
- Acroporium serricalyx (Broth. & Watts) Broth.
- Acroporium smallii (R.S.Williams) H.A.Crum & L.E.Anderson
- Acroporium stellatum (Renauld & Cardot) Broth.
- Acroporium strepsiphyllum (Mont.) B.C.Tan
- Acroporium subluxurians (Dixon & Thér.) O'Shea
- Acroporium vincensianum (Thér.) Broth.
- Acroporium warburgii (Broth.) M.Fleisch.
