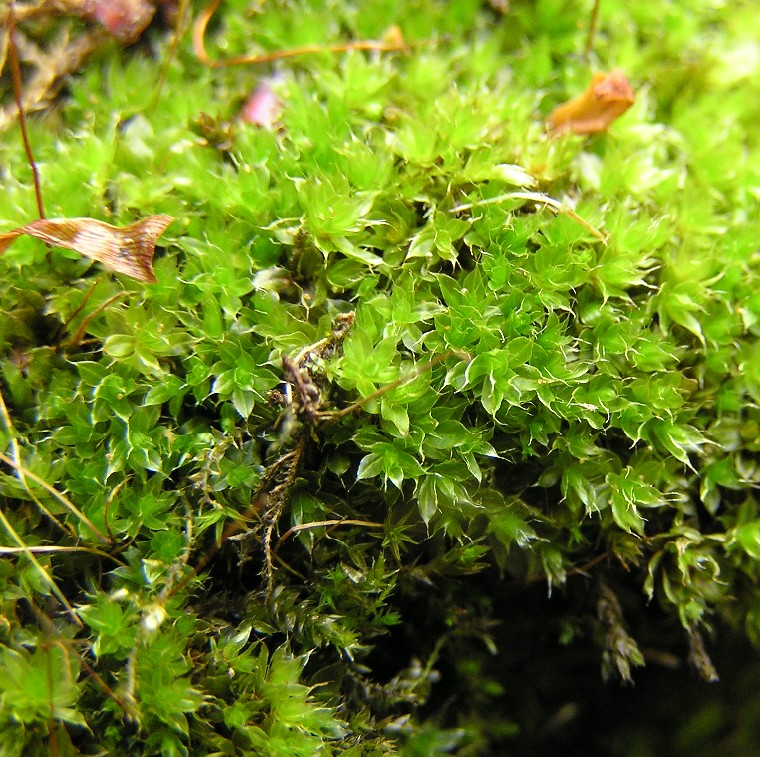

Scientific classification
- Kingdom: Plantae
- Division: Bryophyta
- Class: Bryopsida
- Subclass: Bryidae
- Order: Bryales
- Family: Bryaceae
- Genus: Rosulabryum
- Species: R. capillare

Binomial name
- Rosulabryum capillare (Hedw.) J.R. Spence

Synonyms
- Basionym: Bryum capillare Hedw.; Synonyms: Hypnum capillare (Hedw.) F.Weber & D.Mohr; Tayloria sinensis Müll.Hal.; Bryum abbreviatum Hampe; Bryum amoenum Broth.; Bryum aschersonii Müll.Hal.; Bryum baueri Hampe; Bryum capillare subsp. platyloma (Schwägr.) Podp.; Bryum capillare subsp. rufifolium Dixon; Bryum capillare subsp. sydowii (Podp.) Podp.; Bryum capillare var. arcuatum (Podp.) Pavletić; Bryum capillare var. arvense (Röll) Röll; Bryum capillare var. kaernabachii (Müll.Hal.) Podp.; Bryum capillare var. piliferum (Podp.) Pavletić; Bryum capillare f. pulvinatum (Warnst.) Podp.; Bryum cavum Müll.Hal.; Bryum chilense Reichardt; Bryum courtoisii Broth. & Paris; Rhodobryum luehmannianum (Müll.Hal.) Paris; Rhodobryum microcomosum (Müll.Hal.) Paris; Rhodobryum saprophilum Paris; Bryum decaryanum Thér.; Bryum erythroneuron Mitt.; Bryum fosteri Holz.; Bryum higoense Ochi; Bryum immarginatum Broth.; Bryum itatiayae Broth.; Bryum kaernbachii Müll.Hal.; Bryum laxulum Cardot; Bryum leptothecioides Broth. & Watts; Bryum longedecurrens Broth.; Bryum luehmannianum Müll.Hal.; Bryum microcomosum Müll.Hal.; Bryum nagasakense Broth.; Bryum nagasakense var. laxifolium Cardot; Bryum nanocoma Müll.Hal.; Bryum nanotorquescens Müll.Hal.; Bryum nigerianum Broth. & Paris; Bryum oligoloma P.de la Varde; Bryum pappeanum Müll.Hal.; Bryum picnoloma Müll.Hal. ex Wijk, Margad. & Florsch.; Bryum platyloma Schwägr.; Bryum plebejum Müll.Hal.; Bryum pobeguinii Broth. & Paris; Bryum polytrichoideum Müll.Hal.; Bryum pottiifolium Müll.Hal.; Bryum pseudotorquescens Müll.Hal.; Bryum rhomboidale Thér.; Bryum rimicola Cardot & Broth.; Bryum searlii R.Br.bis; Bryum siamense Dixon; Bryum spathulatulum Müll.Hal.; Bryum stephanii Herzog; Bryum streptophyllum Kindb.; Bryum sydowii Podp.; Bryum taitumense Cardot; Bryum teneriffae Hampe; Bryum terebellum Hampe; Bryum tosanum Cardot; Bryum triste De Not.; Bryum validicostatum Cardot & Dixon; Bryum vinoviride E.B.Bartram; Bryum vulcanicola Müll.Hal.; Bryum yuennanense Broth.; Bryum capillare var. nagasakense (Broth.); Bryum percrispifolium E.B.Bartram; Mielichhoferia cuspidifera Kindb.; Bryum rufifolium (Dixon) Demaret & R.Wilczek; Bryum capillare var. laxifolium (Cardot) Z.Iwats. & Nog.; Mnium capillare (Hedw.) With.; Mnium cylindricum Hornsch.; Bryum pallens subsp. amoenum (Broth.) Podp.; Bryum capillare f. arvense Röll; Bryum capillare var. pulvinatum Warnst.; Bryum capillare f. piliferum Podp.; Bryum capillare f. arcuatum Podp.; Rosulabryum platyloma (Schwägr.) Ochyra; Plagiobryum capillare (Hedw.) N.Pedersen; Ptychostomum capillare (Hedw.) Holyoak & N.Pedersen; Bryum capense (Müll.Hal.) Podp.; Bryum senopyxis Müll.Hal.; Polla cylindrica (Hornsch.) Brid.; Bryum baileyi Holz.; Bryum cylindricum (Hornsch.) Brid.; Bryum domingense Müll.Hal.; Bryum heteroneuron (Müll.Hal. & Kindb.); Bryum microsporum Broth.; Bryum rubicundum Stirt.; Bryum saprophilum Müll.Hal. ex Broth.; Bryum spininervium Dixon; Bryum squarrosum Kindb.; Bryum capillare var. acutifolium Podp.; Bryum capillare var. austriacum Podp.; Bryum capillare var. badense Podp.; Bryum capillare var. basalticum Podp.; Bryum capillare var. bivalens Marchal & É.J.Marchal; Bryum capillare var. brotheri Ihsiba; Bryum capillare subsp. capense (Müll.Hal.) Podp.; Bryum capillare var. cavifolium Breidl.; Bryum capillare var. coarctatum Warnst.; Bryum capillare var. courtoisii (Broth. & Paris) Podp.; Bryum capillare subsp. cuspidatum (Schimp.) Podp.; Bryum capillare var. cymbifolium Hook. & Wilson; Bryum capillare var. decurrens Luisier; Bryum capillare var. ellipticum Sendtn.; Bryum capillare var. erythroneurum Podp.; Bryum capillare var. fallax Lange; Bryum capillare subsp. graniticum Podp.; Bryum capillare subsp. heteroneuron Müll.Hal. & Kindb.; Bryum capillare var. imbricatum Sendtn.; Bryum capillare var. integrifolium Arn.; Bryum capillare var. julaceum Lindb.; Bryum capillare var. latifolium Mönk.; Bryum capillare var. longicollum H.Winter; Bryum capillare var. longifolium Röll; Bryum capillare var. longipilum Mönk.; Bryum capillare var. macrocarpum Huebener; Bryum capillare var. majus Bruch & Schimp.; Bryum capillare subsp. marginatum Podp.; Bryum capillare subsp. meridionale (Schimp.) Podp.; Bryum capillare var. microcarpum Warnst.; Bryum capillare f. microdictyon Latzel; Bryum capillare var. microphyllum Podp.; Bryum capillare var. mitogenum Podp.; Bryum capillare var. molle Péterfi; Bryum capillare var. normalia Podp.; Bryum capillare subsp. ovoideum Podp.; Bryum capillare f. pseudocapillare (Géneau & Maheu) Podp.; Bryum capillare var. radiculosum Piré; Bryum capillare var. robustum Röll; Bryum capillare var. rupestre Podp.; Bryum capillare subsp. ruraliforme Kindb.; Bryum capillare var. schimperi J.-P.Frahm; Bryum capillare var. semilimbatum Podp.; Bryum capillare subsp. siluricum Podp.; Bryum capillare var. simile J.-P.Frahm; Bryum capillare subsp. soederbergii Podp.; Bryum capillare var. speciosum Myrin; Bryum capillare var. spininervium Podp.; Bryum capillare var. submontanum Josef VelenovskýVelen.; Bryum capillare subsp. subsudeticum Podp.; Bryum capillare var. tectorum Warnst.; Bryum capillare var. teneriffae (Hampe) Geh.; Bryum capillare var. triste (De Not.) Limpr.; Bryum capillare var. ungeri Podp.; Bryum capillare var. upplandicum Podp.; Bryum capillare var. ustulatum G.Roth; Bryum capillare var. vaermlandicum Podp.; Bryum capillare var. vulgare Boulay; Bryum capillare var. weidmannii Podp.; Bryum donianum subsp. platyloma (Schwägr.) Podp.; Bryum donianum subsp. squarrosum Podp.; Bryum donianum subsp. sydowii (Podp.) Podp.; Bryum donianum subsp. teneriffae (Hampe) Podp.; Bryum elegans var. longipilum (Mönk.) Pavletić; Bryum nigerianum var. germainii P.de la Varde & Demaret; Bryum pallens var. pseudocapillare Géneau & Maheu; Bryum pallens subsp. triste (De Not.) J.J.Amann; Bryum pappeanum var. humile Müll.Hal.; Bryum caespiticium var. laxum Hook. & Wilson; Bryum capillare var. capense Müll.Hal.; Bryum capillare var. cuspidatum Schimp.; Bryum capillare var. meridionale Schimp.; Bryum capillare var. microcarpum H.Winter; Bryum capillare var. microcarpum J.J.Amann; Bryum capillare var. platyloma (Schwägr.) Schimp.; Bryum capillare var. rufifolium (Dixon) Podp.; Bryum rufifolium (Dixon) P.W.Richards & E.C.Wallace

= Rosulabryum capillare =

Species of moss

Rosulabryum capillare (formerly Bryum capillare) is a species of moss in the Bryaceae family. It has cosmopolitan distribution and is known by the common name capillary threadmoss.

Rosulabryum capillare can use artificial light to grow in places that are otherwise devoid of natural light, such as Crystal Cave in Wisconsin.
