= Platygyriella imbricatifolia =

Scientific classification
- Kingdom: Plantae
- Division: Bryophyta
- Class: Bryopsida
- Subclass: Bryidae
- Order: Hypnales
- Family: Hypnaceae
- Genus: Platygyriella
- Species: P. imbricatifolia

Binomial name
- Platygyriella imbricatifolia (R.S.Williams ex Cardot) Thér.

Synonyms
- Erythrodontium imbricatifolium R.S.Williams ex Cardot

Species of moss

Platygyriella imbricatifolia is a species of moss belonging to the genus Platygyriella. Before being named Platygyriella imbricatifolia, it was placed in the genus Erythrodontium by R.S. Williams and Jules Cardot. It was then transferred to the genus Platygyriella by Marie Hypolite Irénée Thériot in 1926.
