= Catagonium serrulatum =

Scientific classification
- Kingdom: Plantae
- Clade: Embryophytes
- Division: Bryophyta
- Class: Bryopsida
- Subclass: Bryidae
- Order: Hypnales
- Family: Catagoniaceae
- Genus: Catagonium
- Species: C. serrulatum

Binomial name
- Catagonium serrulatum (Cardot & Broth.) Broth.

Synonyms
- Taxiphyllum serrulatum (Cardot ex Broth. & Paris) S.H. Lin

Species of moss

Catagonium serrulatum is a species of moss from the genus Catagonium. It was described by Viktor Ferdinand Brotherus in 1925, from material collected in Panama.
