= Catagonium complanatum =

Scientific classification
- Kingdom: Plantae
- Division: Bryophyta
- Class: Bryopsida
- Subclass: Bryidae
- Order: Hypnales
- Family: Catagoniaceae
- Genus: Catagonium
- Species: C. complanatum

Binomial name
- Catagonium complanatum (Cardot & Broth.) Broth.

Species of moss

Catagonium complanatum is a species of moss from the genus Catagonium. It has discovered by Jules Cardot and Viktor Ferdinand Brotherus in 1925. Before the name Catagonium complanatum, it had a basionym named Calliergonella complanata by Cardot & Broth.
