= Platygyriella kirtikarii =

Scientific classification
- Kingdom: Plantae
- Division: Bryophyta
- Class: Bryopsida
- Subclass: Bryidae
- Order: Hypnales
- Family: Hypnaceae
- Genus: Platygyriella
- Species: P. kirtikarii

Binomial name
- Platygyriella kirtikarii (Cardot & Dixon) W.R.Buck

Synonyms
- Erythrodontium densum var. brevifolium Cardot; Erythrodontium imbricatifolium R.S.Williams ex Cardot

Species of moss

Platygyriella kirtikarii is a species of moss from the genus Platygyriella. It was discovered by Kirtikar (1990) in Asia and only occurs in Asia. Before the name Platygyriella kirtikarii, it was named Bryosedgwickia kirtikarii by Cardot & Dixon.
