= Platygyriella aurea =

Scientific classification
- Kingdom: Plantae
- Division: Bryophyta
- Class: Bryopsida
- Subclass: Bryidae
- Order: Hypnales
- Family: Hypnaceae
- Genus: Platygyriella
- Species: P. aurea

Binomial name
- Platygyriella aurea (Schwägr.) W.R. Buck

Synonyms
- Cylindrothecium aureum (Schwägr.) Paris; Leskea aurea (Schwägr.) Harv.; Pylaisia aurea (Schwägr.) Broth.

Species of moss

Platygyriella aurea is a species of moss belonging to the genus Platygyriella. It is found in Asia and only occurs in Nepal, India, and Laos.
