= Platygyriella aureoides =

Scientific classification
- Kingdom: Plantae
- Division: Bryophyta
- Class: Bryopsida
- Subclass: Bryidae
- Order: Hypnales
- Family: Hypnaceae
- Genus: Platygyriella
- Species: P. aureoides

Binomial name
- Platygyriella aureoides (Broth. & Paris) W.R. Buck

Synonyms
- Pylaisaea aureoides Broth. & Paris

Species of moss

Platygyriella aureoides is a species of moss from the genus Platygyriella. It is found in Africa.
