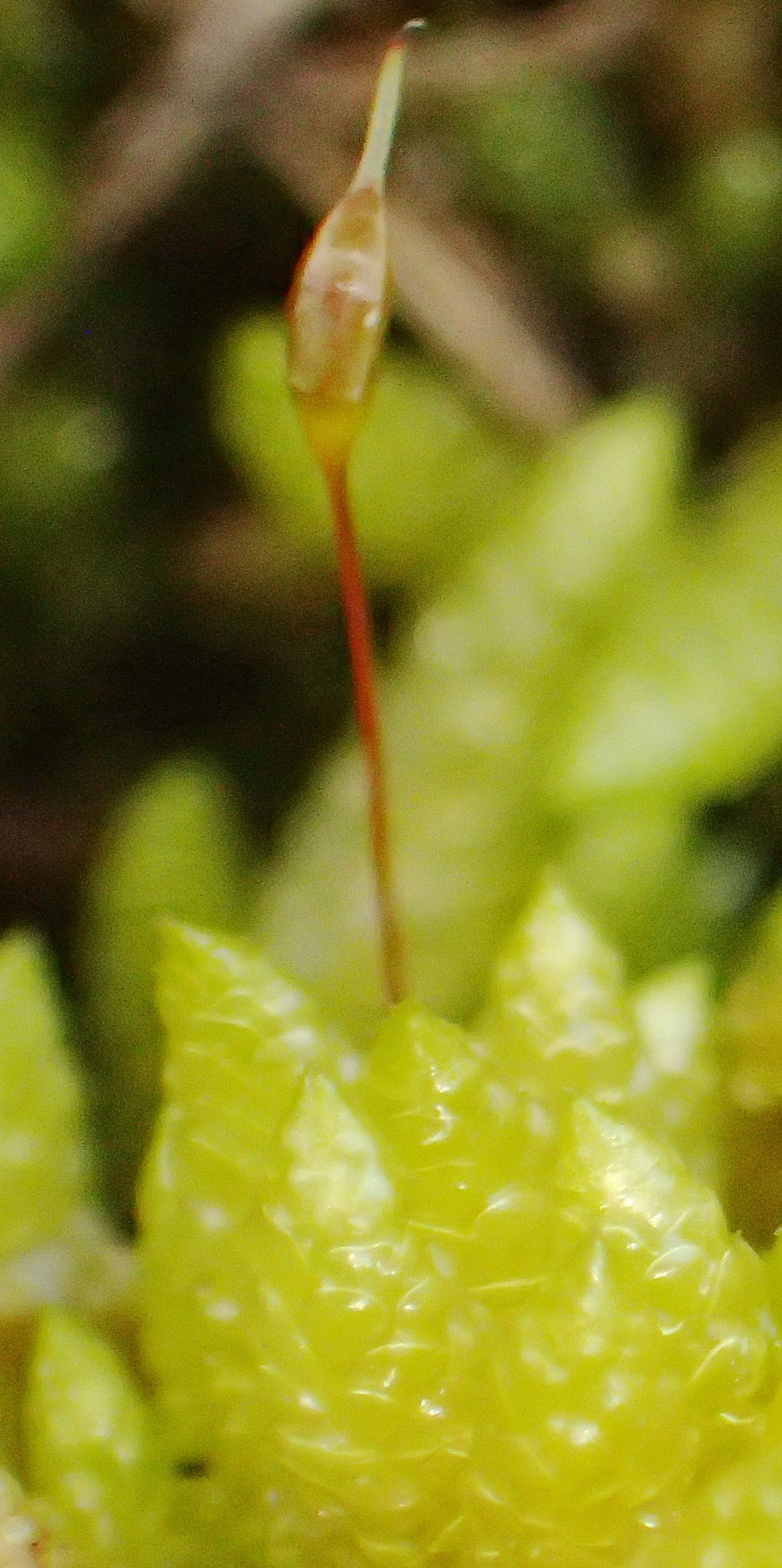
- Catagonium nitens

Scientific classification
- Kingdom: Plantae
- Clade: Embryophytes
- Division: Bryophyta
- Class: Bryopsida
- Subclass: Bryidae
- Order: Hypnales
- Family: Catagoniaceae; W.R.Buck & Ireland

Genera
- Catagonium Müll.Hal. ex Broth.

= Catagoniaceae =

Family of mosses

Catagoniaceae is a small family of mosses in the order Hypnales, distinguished by its hypnoid peristome characterized by well-developed, ornamented exostomial teeth and leaves with double costae. Species typically grow in compact tufts or dense mats on various substrates, including tree trunks (corticicolous), rocks (rupicolous), and soil (terricolous). The family has a disjunct distribution, primarily found in South America (especially Brazil's Atlantic Forest and Amazon Rainforest) and Oceania. In Brazil, these mosses inhabit diverse vegetation types such as ombrophilous forests and high-altitude environments.

== Morphology ==
Catagoniaceae species are relatively small, forming dense green mats. They feature:

- Ascending stems (caulidia) with irregular or simple branching
- Cylindrical or flattened shoots
- Rhizoids with projections at the stem base
- Clustered oblong-ovate to elliptic leaves with abruptly apiculate tips
- Dioicous sexuality
- A double-layered peristome (exostome and endostome)

== Distribution ==
=== Phytogeographic Domains ===
- Amazon rainforest (Brazilian Norte region)
- Atlantic Forest (Brazilian Nordeste, Sudeste, and Sul regions)

=== Geographic Range ===
In Brazil, recorded in:

- Norte: Amazonas, Pará
- Nordeste: Alagoas
- Sudeste: Espírito Santo, Minas Gerais, Rio de Janeiro, São Paulo
- Sul: Paraná, Rio Grande do Sul, Santa Catarina

== Genera and species ==
The family is monogeneric, containing only Catagonium with nine recognized species:

- Catagonium brevicaudatum Müll.Hal. ex Broth.
- Catagonium emarginatum S.H.Lin
- Catagonium nitens (Brid.) Cardot
- Catagonium nitidum (Hook.f. & Wilson) Broth.
- Catagonium politum (Hook.f. & Wilson) Dusén ex Broth.
- Catagonium serrulatum (Cardot) Broth.
- Catagonium mucronatum (A.Jaeger) Broth.
- Catagonium gracile (Besch.) Broth.
- Catagonium complanatum (Cardot & Broth.) Broth.

== Phylogeny ==
Catagoniaceae belongs to the Hypnales order, a monophyletic group of pleurocarpous mosses. Molecular studies suggest close relationships with Brachytheciaceae and Hypnaceae, though robust phylogenetic data remain limited. The family was established to accommodate Catagonium, previously classified in other Hypnalean families.
