= Platygyriella pringlei =

Scientific classification
- Kingdom: Plantae
- Clade: Embryophytes
- Division: Bryophyta
- Class: Bryopsida
- Subclass: Bryidae
- Order: Hypnales
- Family: Hypnaceae
- Genus: Platygyriella
- Species: P. pringlei

Binomial name
- Platygyriella pringlei (Cardot) W.R. Buck

Species of moss

Platygyriella pringlei is a species of moss from the genus Platygyriella. It was discovered in the Americas (especially Mexico). Before the name Platygyriella pringlei, it was named Erythrodontium pringlei by Cardot.
