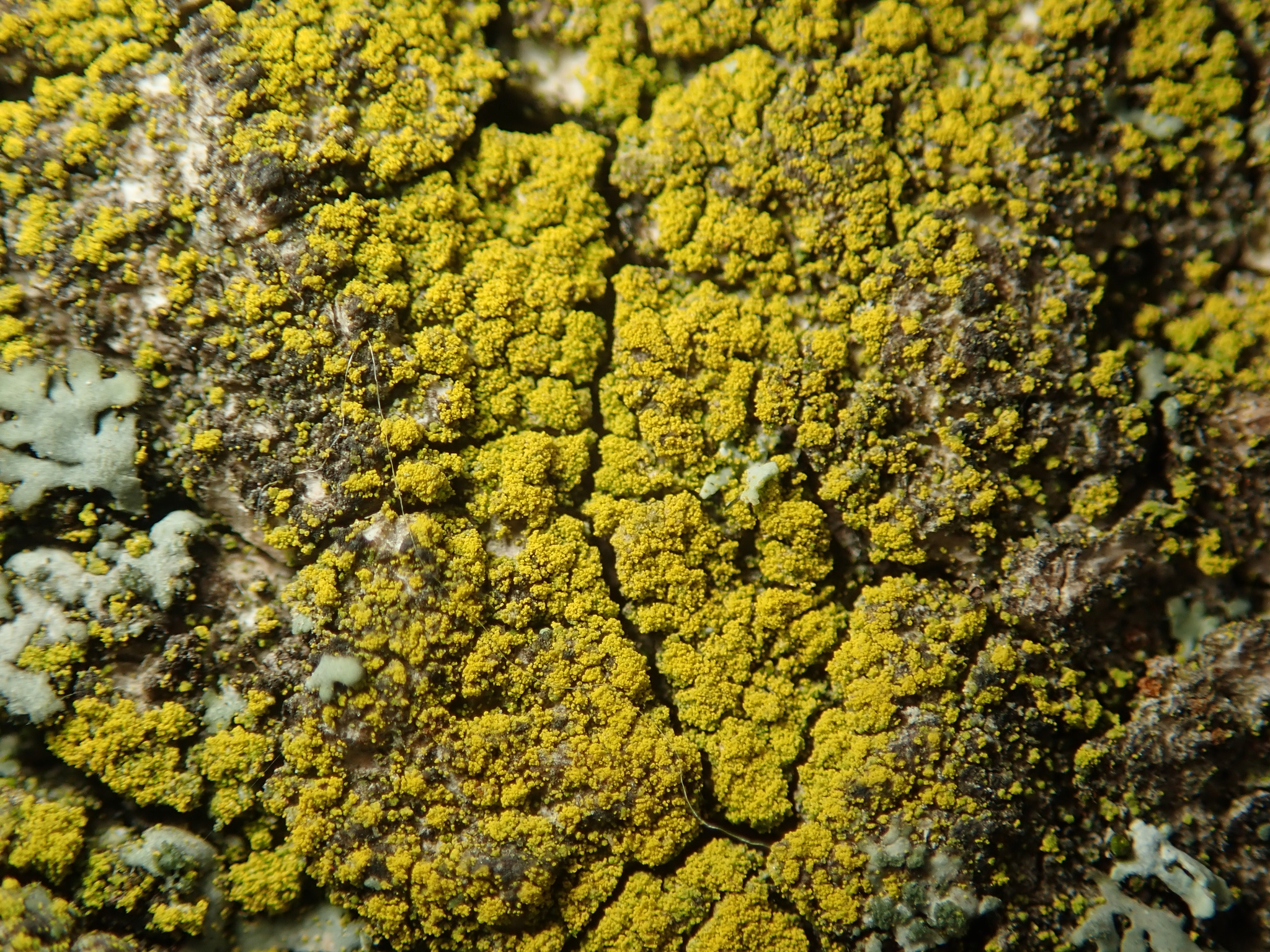

Conservation status
- Secure (NatureServe)

Scientific classification
- Kingdom: Fungi
- Division: Ascomycota
- Class: Candelariomycetes
- Order: Candelariales
- Family: Candelariaceae
- Genus: Candelariella
- Species: C. efflorescens

Binomial name
- Candelariella efflorescens R.C.Harris & W.R.Buck (1978)

= Candelariella efflorescens =

Species of lichen-forming fungus

Candelariella efflorescens, commonly known as the powdery goldfleck lichen, is a sorediate, corticolous (bark-dwelling) crustose lichen in the family Candelariaceae. It is widespread in temperate parts of North America and Europe and has also been confirmed from Asia (Pakistan) by DNA sequence data. The thallus consists of minute yellow areoles that quickly "effloresce" into fine yellow soredia to form a continuous powdery crust; fruiting bodies (apothecia) are rare and small. When fertile, the species has multispored asci (typically 24–30 ascospores), a character separating it from several superficially similar eight-spored species now recognised alongside it.

== Taxonomy ==
Candelariella efflorescens was formally described as a new species in 1978 by Richard C. Harris and William R. Buck. The type specimen was collected by Buck from Hog Island Point State Forest Campground (Michigan, USA); there, at the edge of a swamp, it was found growing on Populus balsamifera. An integrative study combining morphology and internal transcribed spacer (ITS) rDNA data showed that specimens identified as C. efflorescens from Europe form a well-supported clade together with North American material, confirming the species concept across both continents and clarifying earlier misapplications of names.

That study also resolved a complex of sorediate, bark-dwelling Candelariella species: three eight-spored taxa (C. reflexa, C. rubrisoli and C. xanthostigmoides) and two polyspored taxa (C. efflorescens and C. pulchella, the latter described there as new). C. efflorescens and C. pulchella belong to Candelariella in the strict sense (sensu stricto) and are allied to C. xanthostigma and C. vitellina.

== Description ==
The thallus of C. efflorescens is areolate and yellow to green-yellow. Areoles are usually minute (to about 0.25 mm across) and soon become inconspicuous as they dissolve into soredia, though larger areoles can occur; a thin cortex (about 10–15 μm thick) of one to three layers of near-isodiametric cells may be present. Soralia originate in the areoles, initially discrete, convex and well delimited (roughly 0.15–0.4 mm), then coalescing to form extensive continuous sorediate crusts. Soredia are fine (about 20–55 μm in diameter), yellow, with 10–15 chlorococcoid photobiont cells (7–14 μm) surrounded by slightly elongated fungal cells often tinged yellow-brown.

Fruiting bodies (apothecia) are infrequent and small (about 0.2–0.4 mm), lecanorine in form, and have a flat to somewhat convex yellow-orange disc the same colour as the thallus. A distinct proper margin is generally lacking; the thalline margin is thin and may become sorediate or excluded in older apothecia. In section, the thalline margin shows an indistinct pseudocortex of thin-walled, non-gelatinised hyphae; the proper excipulum comprises radiating hyphae with rectangular cells. The hypothecium is colourless; the epihymenium is reddish yellow to yellow-brown; the hymenium is about 70–75 μm tall. Paraphyses are mostly simple with slender tips. Asci are clavate and typically 24–30-spored. Ascospores are simple (rarely thinly septate), oblong to narrowly ellipsoid, about 10–15 × 3.5–5.0 μm.

== Similar species ==
Sterile, sorediate yellow Candelariella on bark can be difficult to determine confidently. C. efflorescens typically has initially visible, tiny areoles that soon effloresce into fine soredia and, when fertile, multispored asci. C. pulchella (polyspored) differs in having coarser soredia and larger apothecia with a persistent proper margin and broader paraphyses tips; C. rubrisoli and C. xanthostigmoides (both eight-spored) tend to show more distinct, often greener areoles and soralia that less readily merge into a continuous crust. Where diagnostic characters are lacking, sterile material is sometimes recorded as Candelariella efflorescens agg. (referring to a species complex)

== Habitat and distribution ==
Candelariella efflorescens grows on well-lit bark of both deciduous and coniferous trees, and it can also occur on wood. It is often encountered along roadsides and in other nitrogen-enriched settings, and may be common locally in such habitats. NatureServe treats it as globally secure (G5).

The species is widespread in temperate North America and Europe. ITS sequences also confirm its presence in Asia (Pakistan), where some sterile specimens had previously been reported as C. xanthostigmoides. Earlier sources treated the species as eastern North American, but material from both continents matches in diagnostic features and clusters together in molecular analyses.
