= Peperomia williamsii =

Scientific classification
- Kingdom: Plantae
- Clade: Tracheophytes
- Clade: Angiosperms
- Clade: Magnoliids
- Order: Piperales
- Family: Piperaceae
- Genus: Peperomia
- Species: P. williamsii

Binomial name
- Peperomia williamsii C.DC.

Species of plant

Peperomia williamsii is a species of an Epiphyte Peperomia Plant. It is endemic to Bolivia. It is named after Robert S. Williams. The Species can be found at Jalopampa in Bolivia at an elevation of 36,000 m (118,000 ft).
