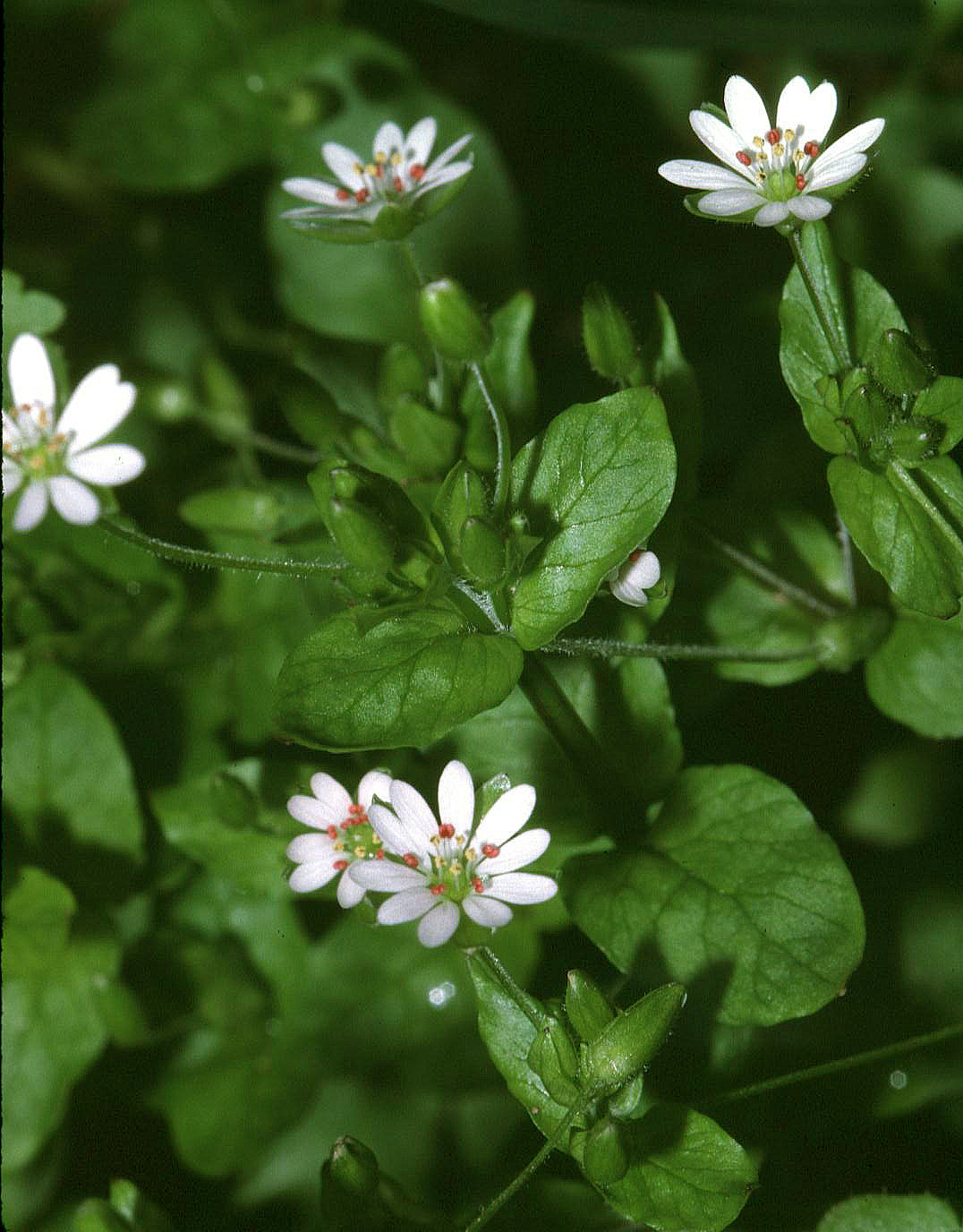

Conservation status
- Least Concern (IUCN 3.1)

Scientific classification
- Kingdom: Plantae
- Clade: Embryophytes
- Clade: Tracheophytes
- Clade: Angiosperms
- Clade: Eudicots
- Order: Caryophyllales
- Family: Caryophyllaceae
- Genus: Stellaria
- Species: S. neglecta

Binomial name
- Stellaria neglecta (Lej.) Weihe.

= Stellaria neglecta =

Species of flowering plant in the carnation family

Stellaria neglecta, greater chickweed, is an annual to short-lived herbaceous perennial flowering plant in the family Caryophyllaceae. It is native to Europe and Asia, where it grows in hedges and woodland margins on neutral to slightly acid, damp soils, and is widespread but rarely abundant. It has been introduced to North America, where it has been spreading in recent decades.

== Description ==
A sprawling annual (to short-lived perennial) with weak branching stems that are usually decumbent at the base, ascending distally to around 80–90 cm (31–35 in), often supported by other plants. The stems are cylindrical and glabrous except for a single line of hairs that runs lengthways, changing sides at each node. Other parts of the plant are usually entirely glabrous. The leaves are arranged in opposite pairs, the lower ones having long (2−5 cm), narrowly winged stalks and a broadly oval-triangular blade about 3 cm long by 1.5 cm wide. The upper leaves are sessile or only very shortly petiolate, slightly larger and more oval. The leaves have one strong central vein along the midrib and about 5 lateral veins on each side.

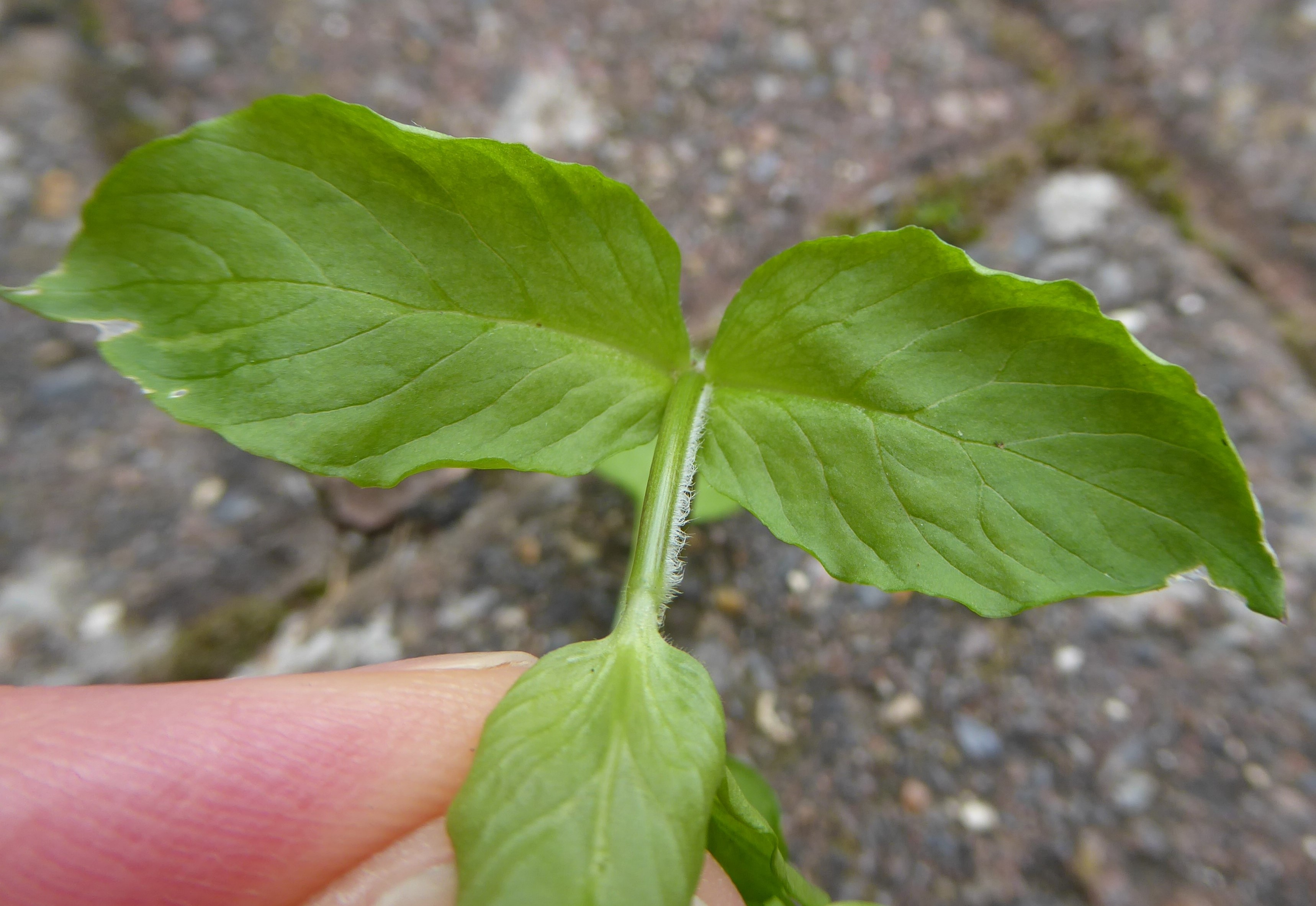
The upper leaves are sessile and somewhat rectangular in outline.

The flowers are borne singly in the uppermost leaf axils on slender 2−3 cm stalks, initially spreading and reflexed, later erect. Each flower has five sepals, 5−6.5 mm long, lanceolate, glabrous or rarely pubescent, with an acute apex. There are also five white petals which are divided almost to the base, giving the impression that there are ten. The petals are usually about the same length as the sepals or just slightly shorter, the whole flower being about 10 mm in diameter. There are 8−10 stamens with reddish anthers, and three styles.

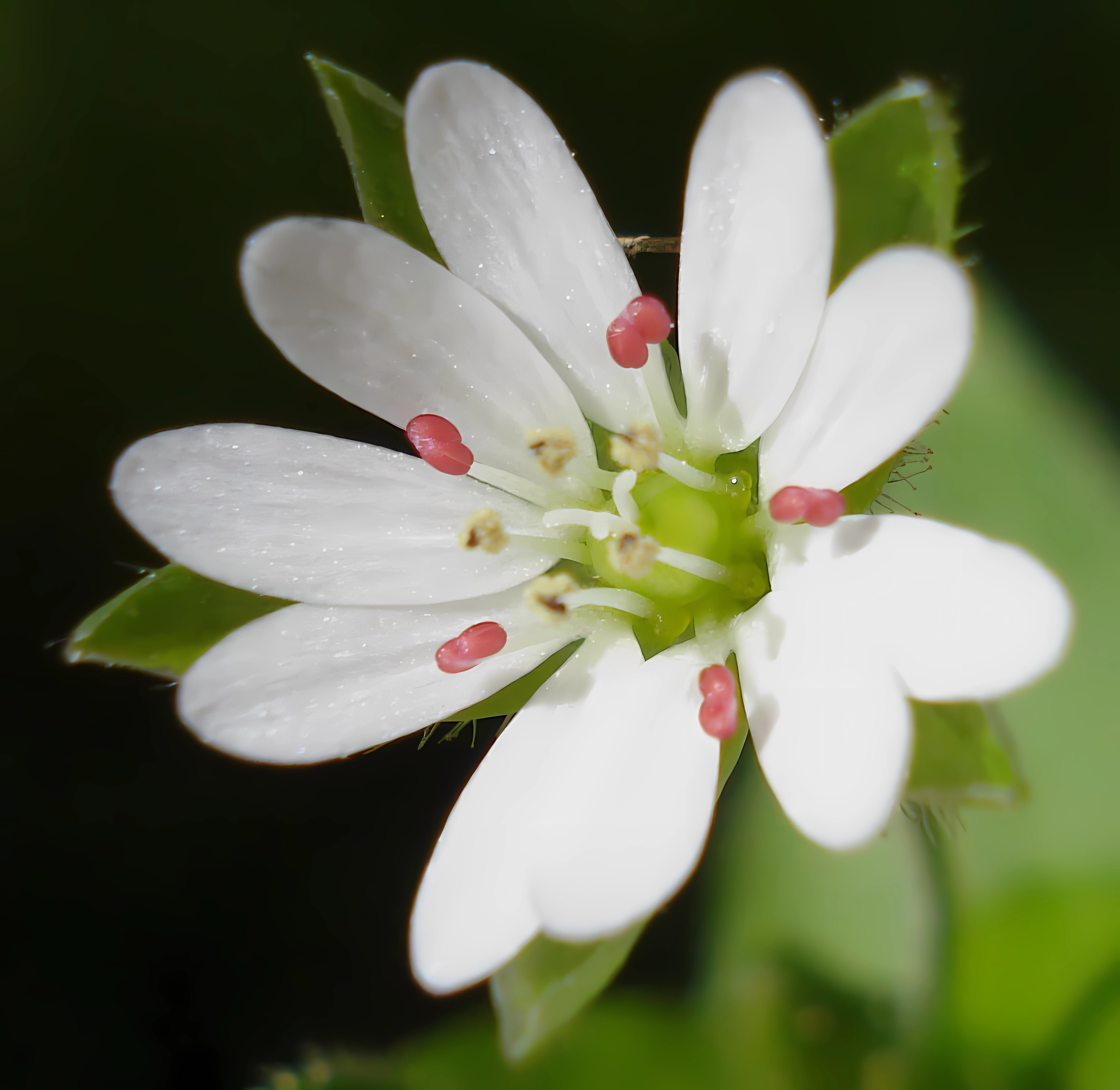
The flowers have ten stamens, although sometimes only the filaments remain.

It flowers between April and July in Northern Europe. The stems can remain alive and produce tillers which overwinter and flower the following year. Seeds are tuberculate, dark reddish-brown, 1.3−1.7 mm in diameter. The tubercles are conical, with an acute apex.

== Taxonomy ==
This species was first published by Alexandre Louis Simon Lejeune in 1825 as Alsine neglecta, which is therefore the basionym. It was then (the same year) moved to the genus Stellaria L. by Carl Ernst August Weihe and this name is accepted to this day. Over the years many synonyms have been coined, such as Alsine decandra Schur (in 1866), Stellaria media var. decandra Fenzl (in 1842) and Stellaria decandra Schur ex Prodan (in 1953). A full list is given by the Synonymic Checklists of the Vascular Plants of the World.

Numerous subspecies, varieties and forms have been named, but none is currently accepted and it is not known to hybridise with any other species.

Its chromosome number is 2n = 22.

The scientific name Stellaria means "like a star" in reference to the flowers, and neglecta is in acknowledgement that it was long overlooked, as it often still is to this day.

== Identification ==
Three species of chickweed have a single line of hairs down the stem. There are various features which can be used to separate them: Stellaria apetala usually has 1–3 stamens and no white petals; S. media has 3–8 stamens and white petals up to 3 mm long; whereas S. neglecta usually has 10 stamens and petals up to 4 mm. As the anthers often fall off, it is best to count the filaments.

In the absence of flowers, the size of the plants (up to 10 cm; 25 cm; 100 cm) is a useful character, as are the leaves (up to 7 mm; 25 mm; 50 mm respectively), which also look rather different on the various species.

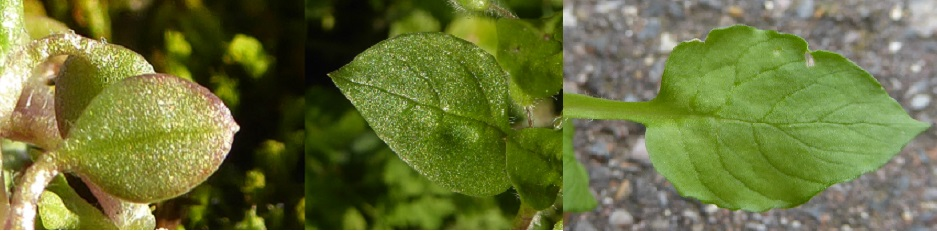
A leaf of Stellaria apetala (left), S. media (middle) and S. neglecta (right). Not to scale.

== Distribution and status ==
Greater chickweed is widely distributed throughout Europe and southern Asia as far east as Japan. In Great Britain, it is most common in the south and west. In North America, it was formerly rare, but it has spread rapidly in recent decades and is now considered a weed in a number of states, from Maryland to California.

The international status of greater chickweed has not been evaluated, but in Britain it is classified as "Least Concern" on the grounds that it is still widespread, albeit declining. In France it is similarly not threatened except in the Alsace region, where it is considered to be vulnerable.

== Habitat and ecology ==
Greater chickweed grows in lightly shaded situations on slightly damp, base-rich and moderately fertile soils. Its Ellenberg values in Britain are L = 6, F = 7, R = 6, N = 7, and S = 0. It is often found in old hedges and on the margins and paths of ancient deciduous woodland, where it is generally sparsely distributed and tends to occur in small patches.

In terms of the British National Vegetation Classification it is recorded in MG1 false oatgrass swards on woodland edges, W6 crack willow woodland by rivers, in W10 oak woodland and W24 bramble scrub in hedges. Because it is quite scarce and declining, and largely restricted to old hedges and woods, it is considered an axiophyte in some counties.

It is a lowland plant, reaching its altitudinal limit of 345 m (1,132 ft) in Britain on Stapeley Hill in Shropshire.

Presumably because it is such a little-known plant, there are no recorded instances of insect associations with this species in Britain. There are also no known galls, rusts or smuts.
