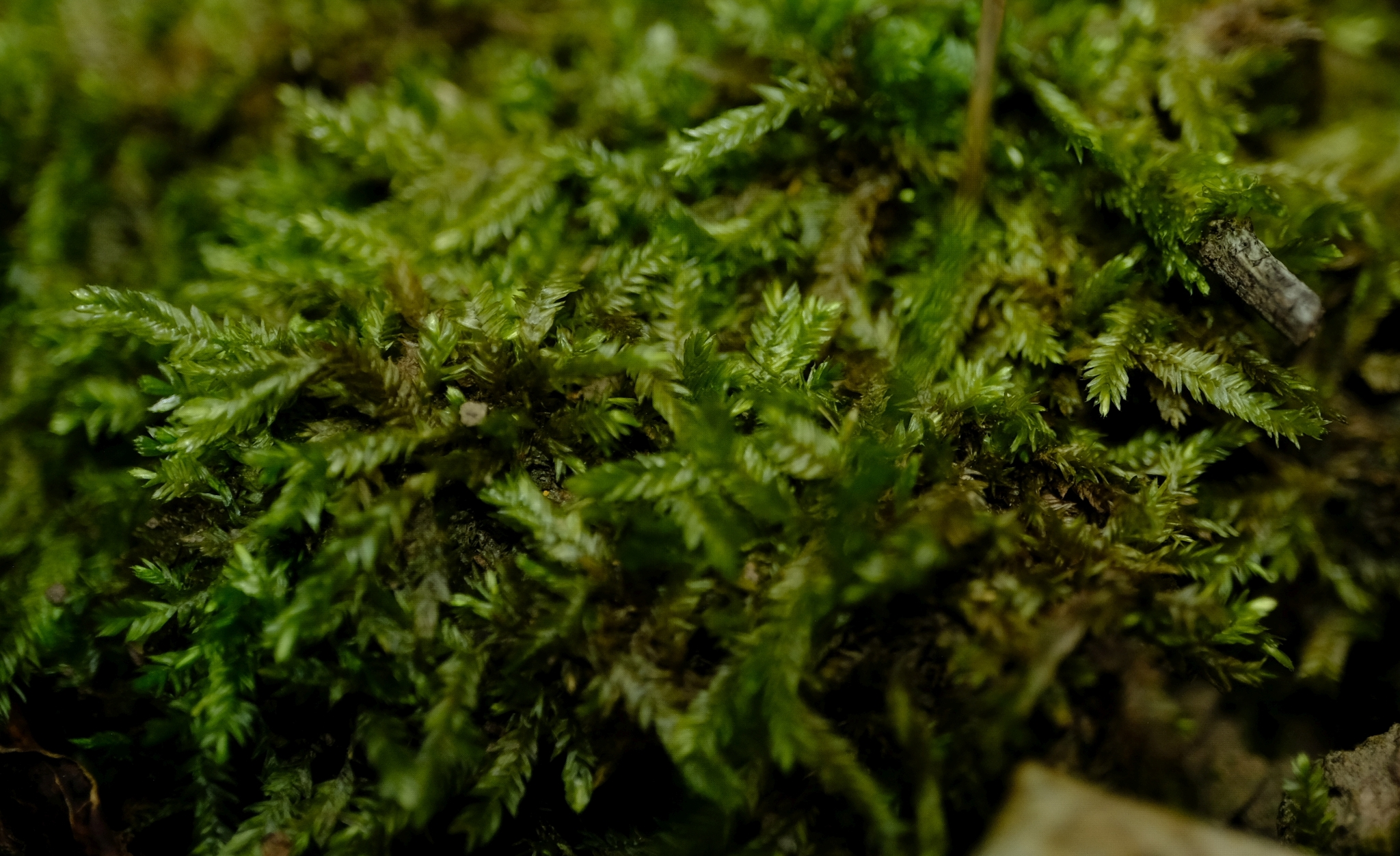
- Catagonium nitens

Scientific classification
- Kingdom: Plantae
- Division: Bryophyta
- Class: Bryopsida
- Subclass: Bryidae
- Order: Hypnales
- Family: Catagoniaceae
- Genus: Catagonium; Müll. Hal. ex Broth.

Species
- Species

= Catagonium =

Genus of moss

Catagonium is a genus of moss belonging to the family Catagoniaceae. It has a all over the world, especially in the Tropical Region.

== Species ==
There are 9 species:

- Catagonium brevicaudatum Müll. Hal. ex Broth.
- Catagonium complanatum (Cardot & Broth.) Broth.
- Catagonium emarginatum S.H. Lin
- Catagonium gracile (Besch.) Broth.
- Catagonium mucronatum (A. Jaeger) Broth.
- Catagonium nitens (Brid.) Cardot
- Catagonium nitidum (Hook. f. & Wilson) Broth.
- Catagonium politum (Hook. f. & Wilson) Dusén ex Broth.
- Catagonium serrulatum (Cardot) Broth.
