= Platygyriella jamaicensis =

Scientific classification
- Kingdom: Plantae
- Division: Bryophyta
- Class: Bryopsida
- Subclass: Bryidae
- Order: Hypnales
- Family: Hypnaceae
- Genus: Platygyriella
- Species: P. jamaicensis

Binomial name
- Platygyriella jamaicensis E.B.Bartram

Species of moss

Platygyriella jamaicensis is a species of moss belonging to the genus Platygyriella. It was discovered in Jamaica in 1936 by E.B. Bartram It has branches with a size length of about 1–1.5 cm (0.39–0.59 in). It has leaves with the length of about 1.4 mm (0.055 in) with an erect top, straight edges, and curved below. It has perichaetal erect leaves (different from the other leaf) spreading, plant with 4–6 mm (0.16–0.24 in) leaves, which are very smooth and thin with an oblong-cylindrical and can reach up to 1.4 mm (0.055 in). It has a basilar crown with are 15–20 μm and yellow.
