= Catagonium gracile =

Scientific classification
- Kingdom: Plantae
- Division: Bryophyta
- Class: Bryopsida
- Subclass: Bryidae
- Order: Hypnales
- Family: Catagoniaceae
- Genus: Catagonium
- Species: C. gracile

Binomial name
- Catagonium gracile (Besch.) Broth.

Synonyms
- Acrocladium gracile Besch.

Species of moss

Catagonium gracile is a species of moss from the genus Catagonium. It was described by Viktor Ferdinand Brotherus in 1908.
