= Catagonium brevicaudatum =

Scientific classification
- Kingdom: Plantae
- Clade: Embryophytes
- Division: Bryophyta
- Class: Bryopsida
- Subclass: Bryidae
- Order: Hypnales
- Family: Catagoniaceae
- Genus: Catagonium
- Species: C. brevicaudatum

Binomial name
- Catagonium brevicaudatum Müll. Hal. ex Broth.

Synonyms
- Catagonium brasiliense Broth.

Species of moss

Catagonium brevicaudatum is a species of moss from the genus Catagonium. It was founded by Müller and Brotherus in 1897. It is commonly found in the Americas, with concentrations in Colombia. Before the name Catagonium brevicaudatum, it has other names including: Eucatagonium brevicaudatum, Hypnum brevicaudatum, and Isopterygium brevicaudatum. The stems of Catagonium brevicaudatum are mostly 2–10 cm.
