= Platygyriella densa =

Scientific classification
- Kingdom: Plantae
- Division: Bryophyta
- Class: Bryopsida
- Subclass: Bryidae
- Order: Hypnales
- Family: Hypnaceae
- Genus: Platygyriella
- Species: P. densa

Binomial name
- Platygyriella densa (Hook.) W.R.Buck

Synonyms
- Entodon pallidissimus Müll. Hal.; Erythrodontium subdensum Broth. & Thér.; Platygyriella helicodontioides Cardot

Species of moss

Platygyriella densa is a species of moss from the genus Platygyriella. Platygyriella densa occurs in the Americas (especially Mexico) and Africa.
