= Platygyriella frahmii =

Scientific classification
- Kingdom: Plantae
- Division: Bryophyta
- Class: Bryopsida
- Subclass: Bryidae
- Order: Hypnales
- Family: Hypnaceae
- Genus: Platygyriella
- Species: P. frahmii

Binomial name
- Platygyriella frahmii (W.R.Buck) T.Arikawa

Species of moss

Platygyriella frahmii is a species of moss from the genus Platygyriella. It was first described as Pylaisiella frahmii by W.R. Buck in 1993 and transferred to Platygyriella by T. Arikawa in 2004. It is found in Africa at an elevation of 2100 meters.
