= Platygyriella fragilifolia =

Scientific classification
- Kingdom: Plantae
- Division: Bryophyta
- Class: Bryopsida
- Subclass: Bryidae
- Order: Hypnales
- Family: Hypnaceae
- Genus: Platygyriella
- Species: P. fragilifolia

Binomial name
- Platygyriella fragilifolia (Dixon) W.R. Buck

Species of moss

Platygyriella fragilifolia is a species of moss in the genus Platygyriella. It was first described as Trachyphyllum fragilifolium by Hugh Neville Dixon in 1938. It was discovered in India and only occurs in Asia.
