= Acroporium aciphyllum =

Scientific classification
- Kingdom: Plantae
- Division: Bryophyta
- Class: Bryopsida
- Subclass: Bryidae
- Order: Hypnales
- Family: Sematophyllaceae
- Genus: Acroporium
- Species: A. aciphyllum

Binomial name
- Acroporium aciphyllum Dixon

Species of moss

Acroporium aciphyllum is a species of moss in the Sematophyllaceae family discovered in the Malay Peninsula.
