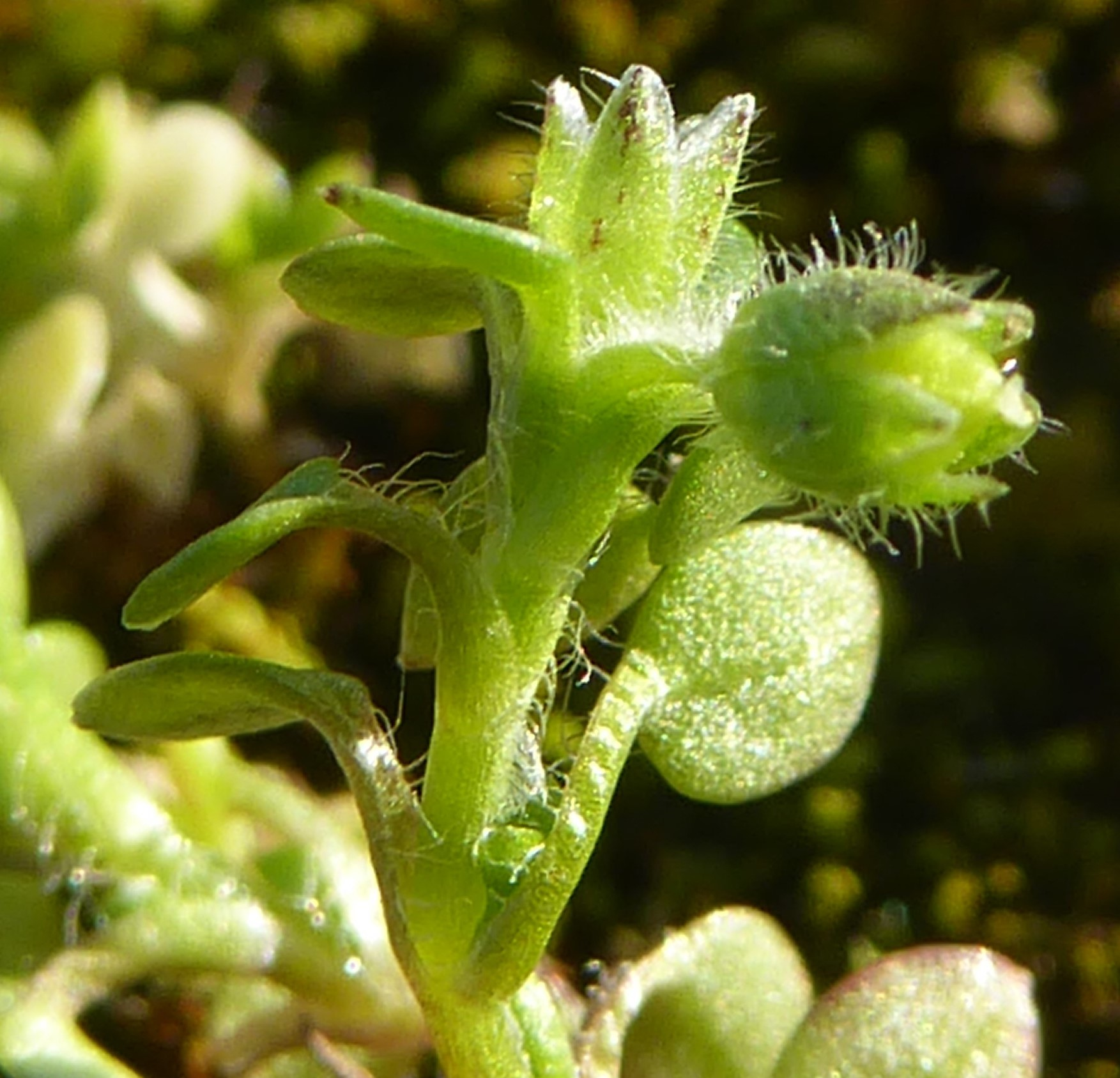

Conservation status
- Least Concern (IUCN 3.1)

Scientific classification
- Kingdom: Plantae
- Clade: Embryophytes
- Clade: Tracheophytes
- Clade: Spermatophytes
- Clade: Angiosperms
- Clade: Eudicots
- Order: Caryophyllales
- Family: Caryophyllaceae
- Genus: Stellaria
- Species: S. apetala

Binomial name
- Stellaria apetala Ucria

Synonyms
- List: Alsine glabella Jord. & Fourr.; Alsine pallida Dumort.; Stellaria abortiva Gay; Stellaria boraeana Jord.; Stellaria homotricha Bég.; Stellaria pallida (Dumort.) Crép.; Stellularia abortiva (Gay) Kuntze; Stellularia media var. apetala (Ucria) Doell. ex Kuntze

= Stellaria apetala =

Species of flowering plant in the carnation family

Stellaria apetala (syn. S. pallida), lesser chickweed, is an annual herbaceous plant in the flowering plant family Caryophyllaceae. It occurs in short, sandy grassland by the sea and, less often, in similar habitat inland. It is native to Europe and is well established as an introduced species worldwide.

== Description ==
Lesser chickweed is a low-growing, patch-forming annual herb with a distinctly yellowish-green colour. It has a dense, spreading root mat which makes it difficult to dislodge from the ground. The stems, which are sometimes tinged purple, spread out along the ground without rooting at the nodes, and lengthen to about 10 cm (3.9 in) long. They are terete and glabrous, with a single line of hairs down one side, which alternates at the nodes. The leaves are opposite, pale green and ovate, 4–7 mm long by 2–3 mm wide, with a pale green or sometimes purple hydathode at the pointed tip and stomata on both sides. The petioles are flattened, hairy and about 3–5 mm long, except at the tip of the stem, where the leaves appear sessile.

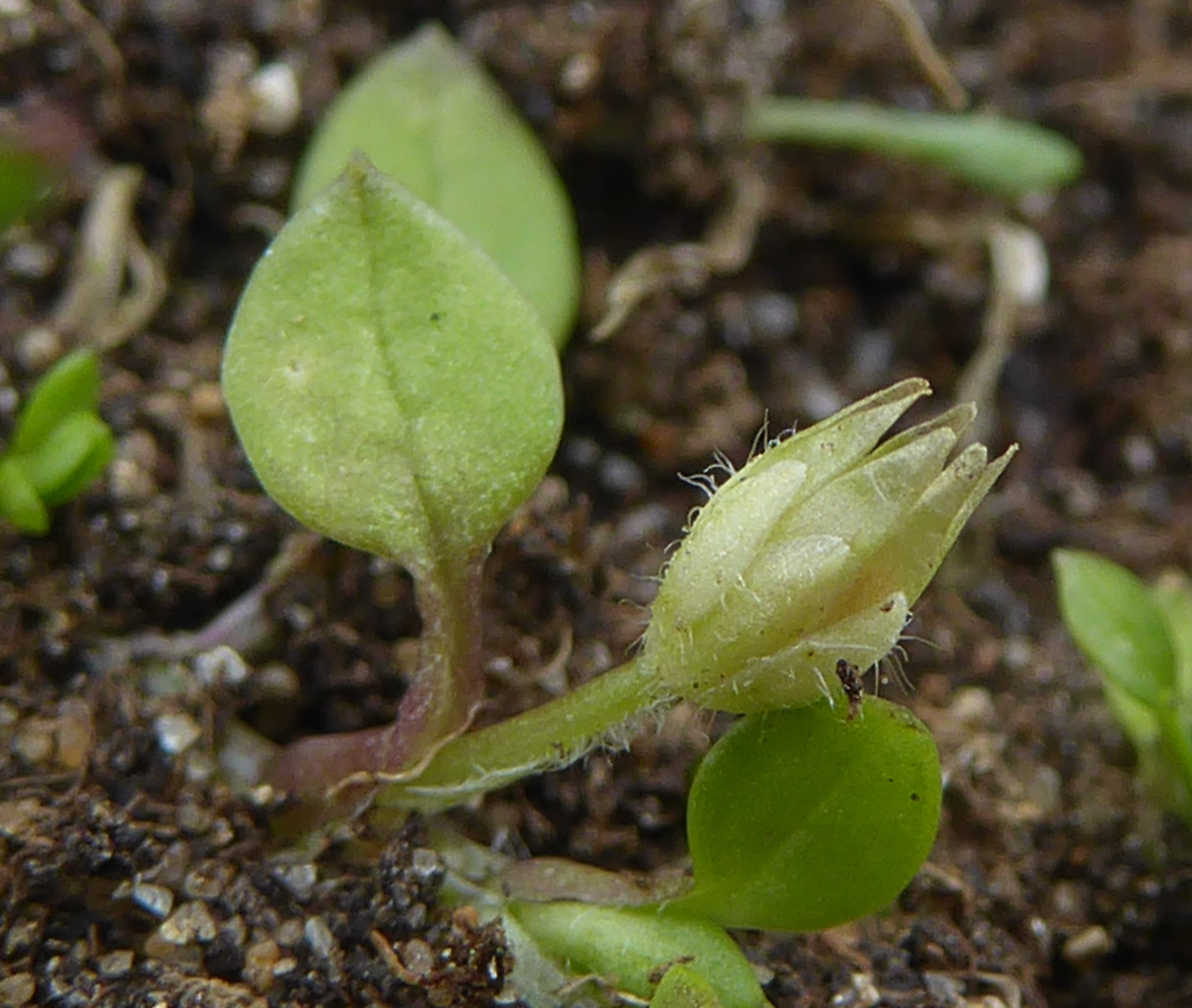
A flower with petals

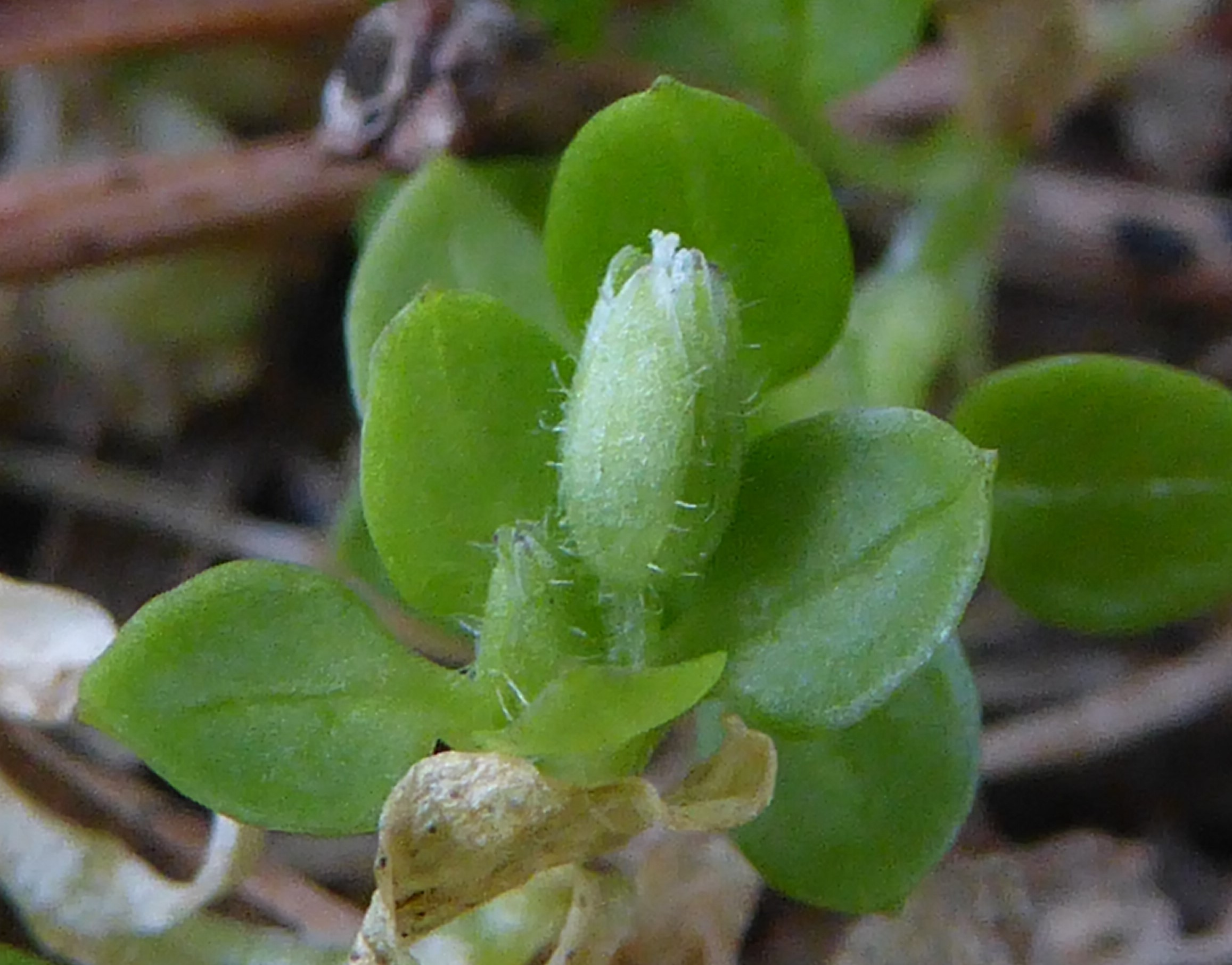
The sepals sometimes have a narrow scarious margin towards the tips.

Flowering occurs in the early spring, February–May in Northern Europe. The inflorescences are terminal and consist of a short cyme of up to six flowers, which are small, 2–3 mm in diameter. There are four or five hairy oval/lanceolate green sepals 2–3.5 mm long. Most flowers have no petals at all, but a small proportion have five deeply bifid green/scarious petals about 1 mm longer than the sepals, which never open widely. There are usually between one and three stamens, sometimes none, with grey-violet anthers, and three styles.

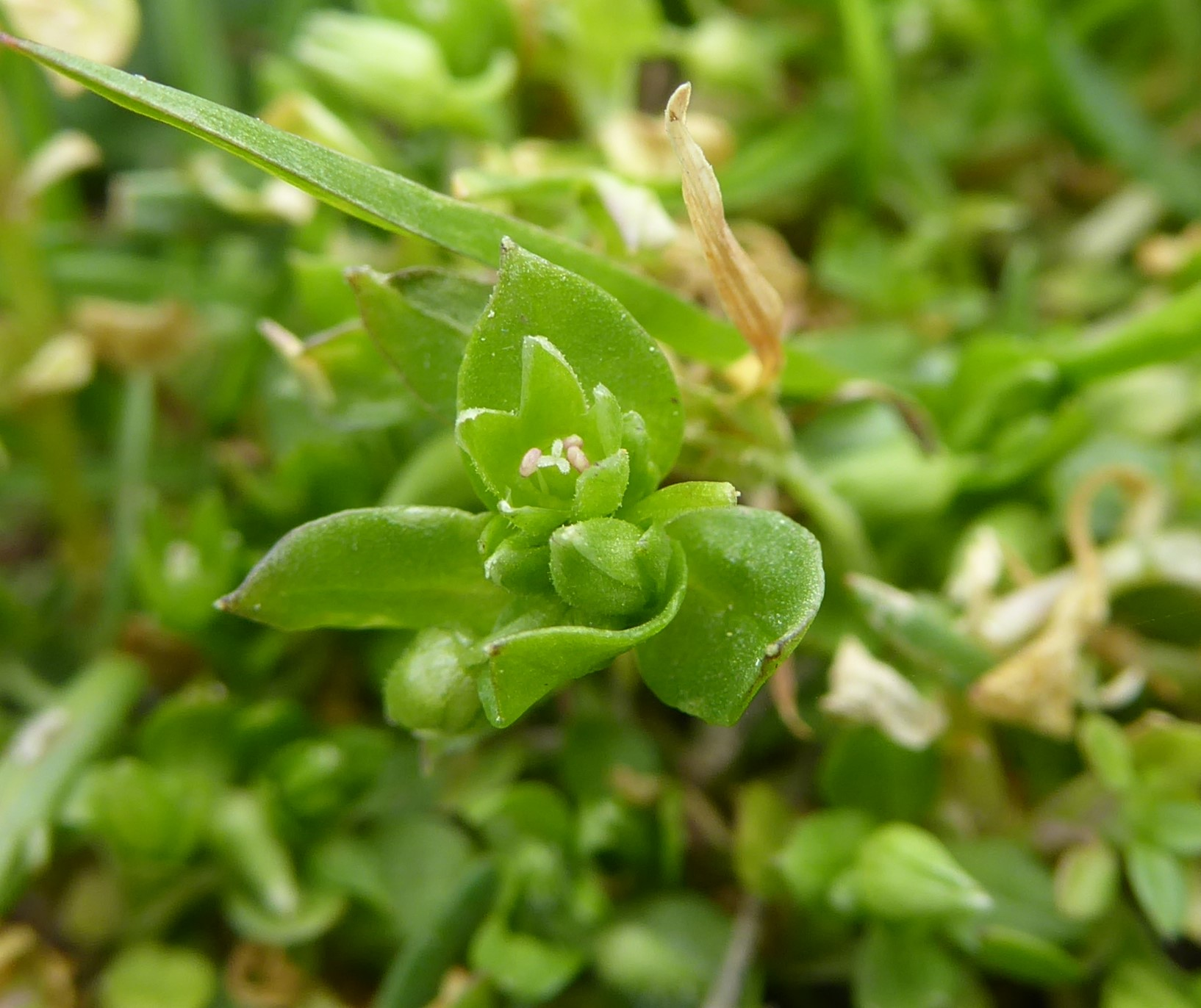
Flowers typically have three or fewer stamens

The fruits are formed a week or two after flowering and consist of an oval green capsule about 3 mm long, which remains surrounded by the sepals. Each fruit contains about 6–8 yellowish-brown disc-shaped seeds which are released when the tip of the fruit opens by six spreading teeth. The seeds are 0.5–0.8 mm in diameter, with a ring of small, blunt tubercles around the rim.

Stellaria apetala is self-pollinating and, because the flowers do not open widely, is often cleistogamous.

== Taxonomy ==
Stellaria apetala forms part of a complex that also includes S. media and S. neglecta. It was first described by Ucria in 1796. In 1828, Du Mortier, describing a form found in Belgium, applied the name Alsine pallida, which Piré (1863) transferred to the genus Stellaria.

The taxonomic status of Stellaria apetala (Dumort.) Piré has been confused. Dandy (1958) and Clapham, Tutin and Warburg (1962) adopted the name Stellaria pallida but while Clapham et al. treated S. apetala Ucria as a synonym, Dandy considered this to be a synonym of S. media L., as also did Chater and Heywood. Whitehead and Sinha, having failed to locate any specimens matching the description in the Flora Europaea, concluded that S. apetala Ucria or S. apetala auct. could be regarded as synonyms of S. pallida (Dumort.) Piré. Stellaria pallida is now considered a junior synonym of Stellaria apetala.

Its chromosome number is 2n = 22.

The name Stellaria is from the Latin stella, for a star, and describes the appearance of the flowers of plants in this genus (not so much this particular species). The prefix "a-" derives from the Ancient Greek, and means "without" or "lacking" and therefore refers to the absence of petals in most specimens. The synonym pallida comes from the Latin pallens, pallidus = pale, and is most likely a reference to the yellowish colour of the foliage.

== Identification ==
Lesser chickweed is easily confused with common chickweed, especially small plants without petals (Stellaria media var. apetala Gaudin). The only certain way to separate them is by a chromosome count, but the following field characters are useful. Lesser chickweed is yellowish, not bright green; the sepals are only up to 3 (not 5) mm long; it has 3 or fewer stamens (media has 3–10); the fruiting capsules are less than 5 mm long; the fruiting pedicels are short and not reflexed; and the ripe seeds are less than 0.9 mm long.

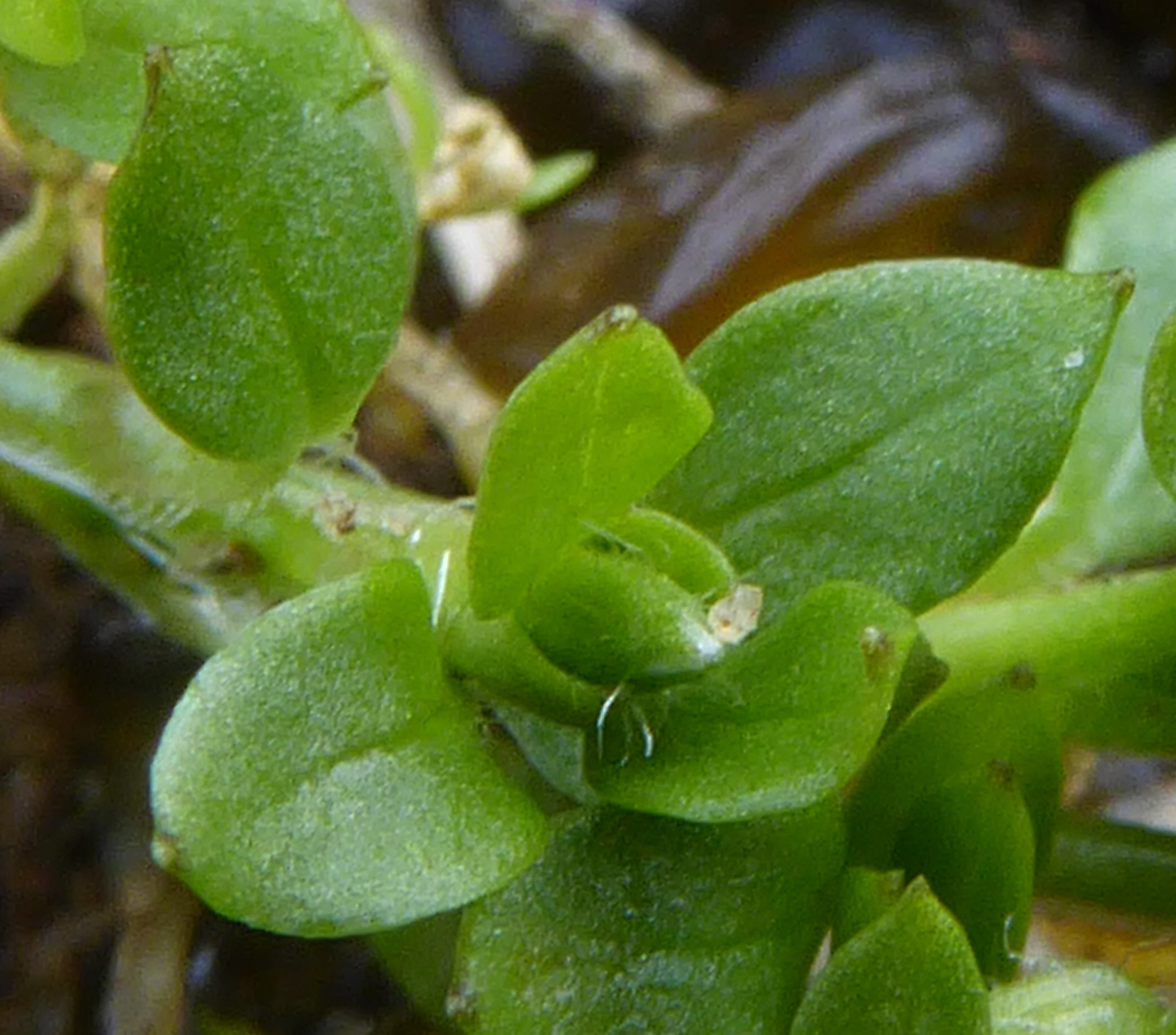
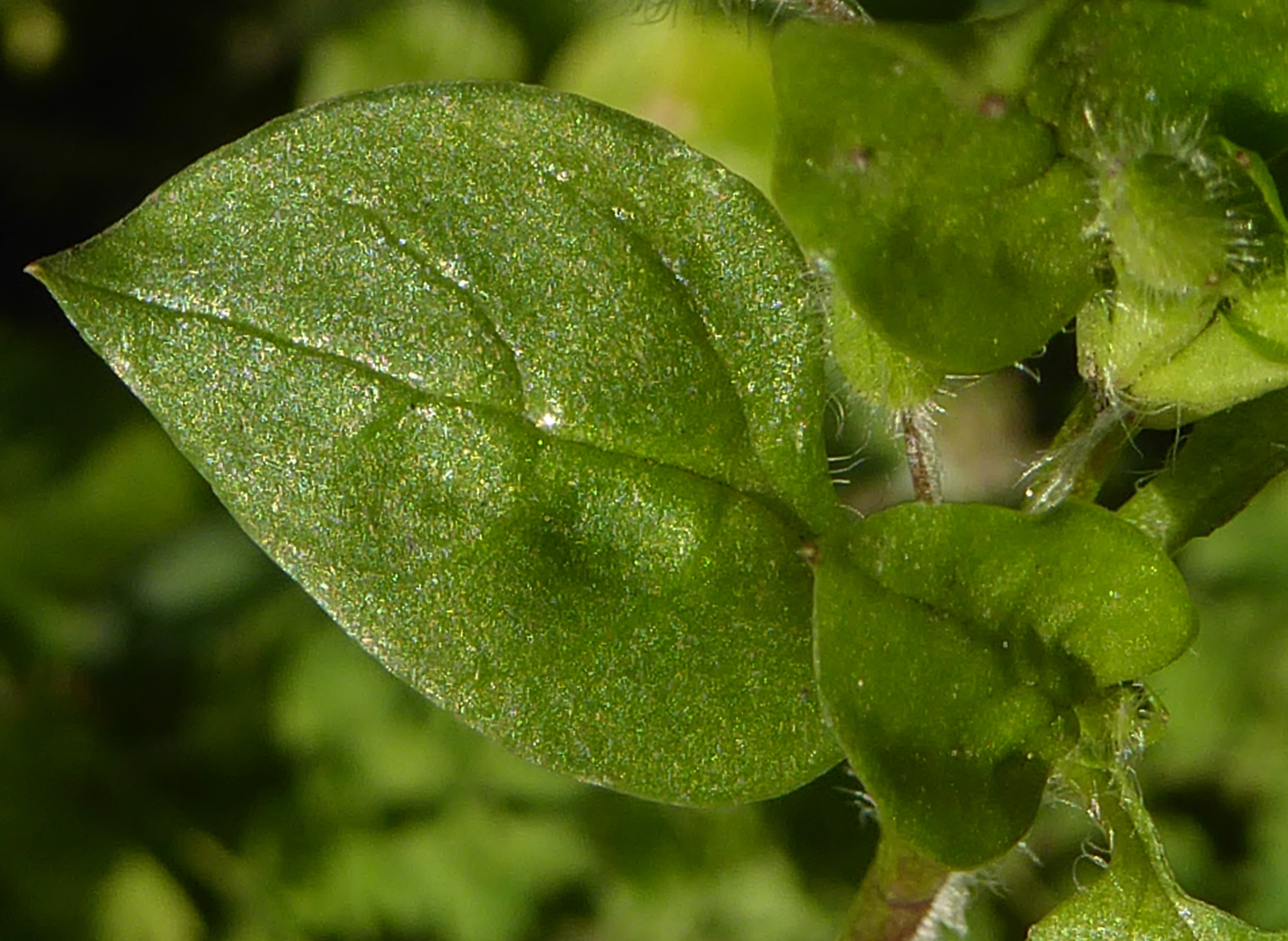
The leaves of lesser chickweed (left) have only one prominent vein, whilst common chickweed (right) has several lateral veins.

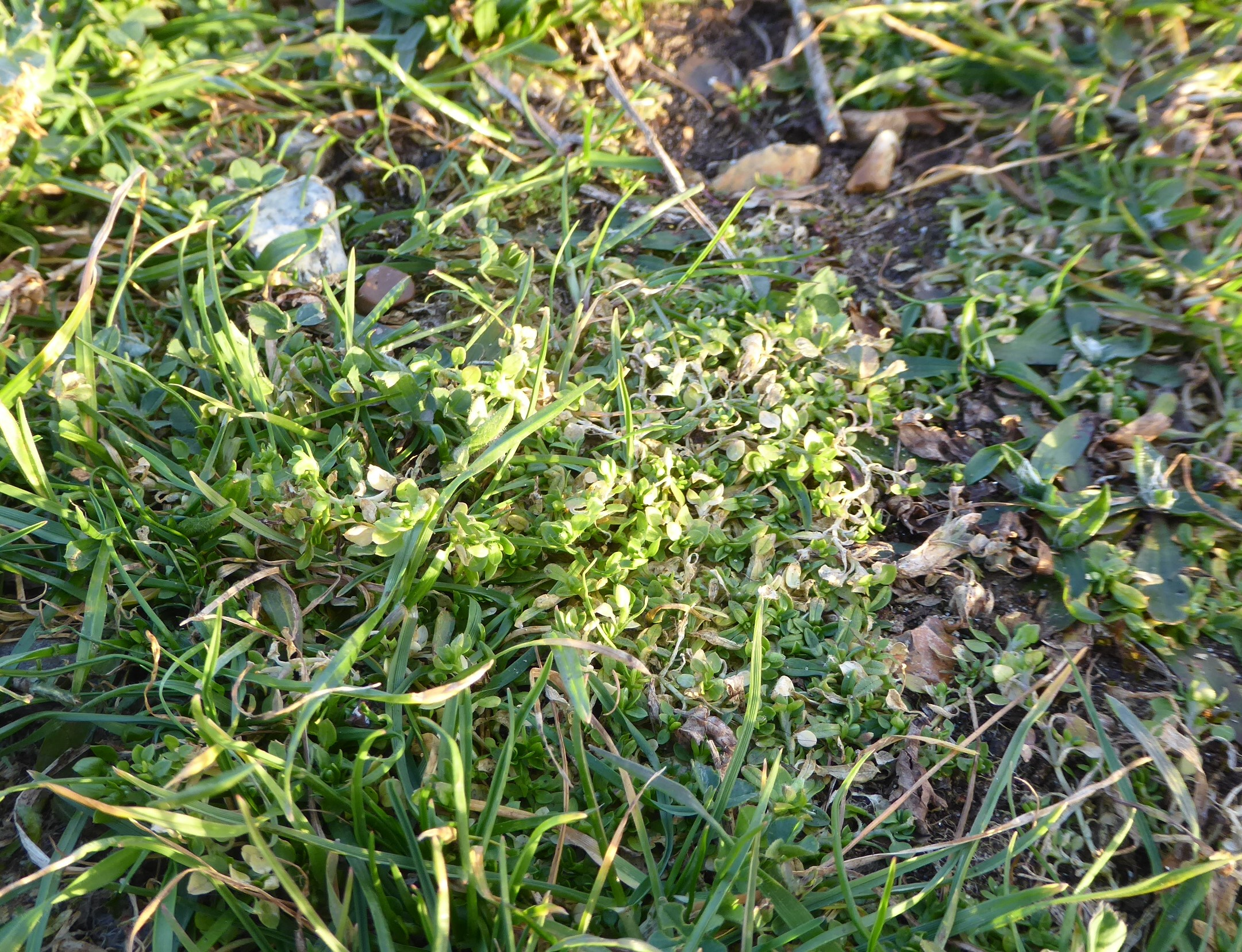
Lesser chickweed has a distinctive yellow/green colour.

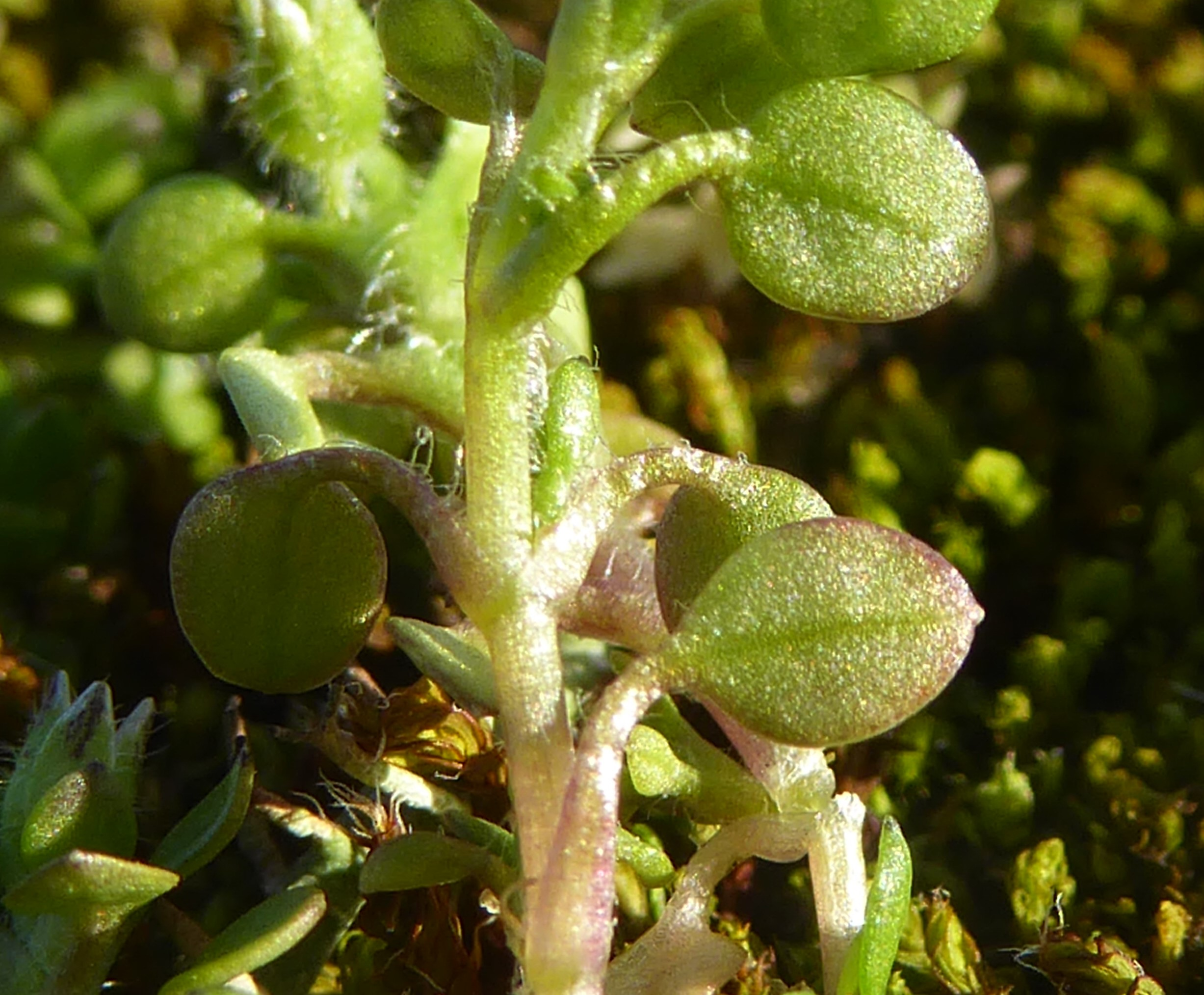
The leaves are oval with a prominent midrib and a pointed tip.

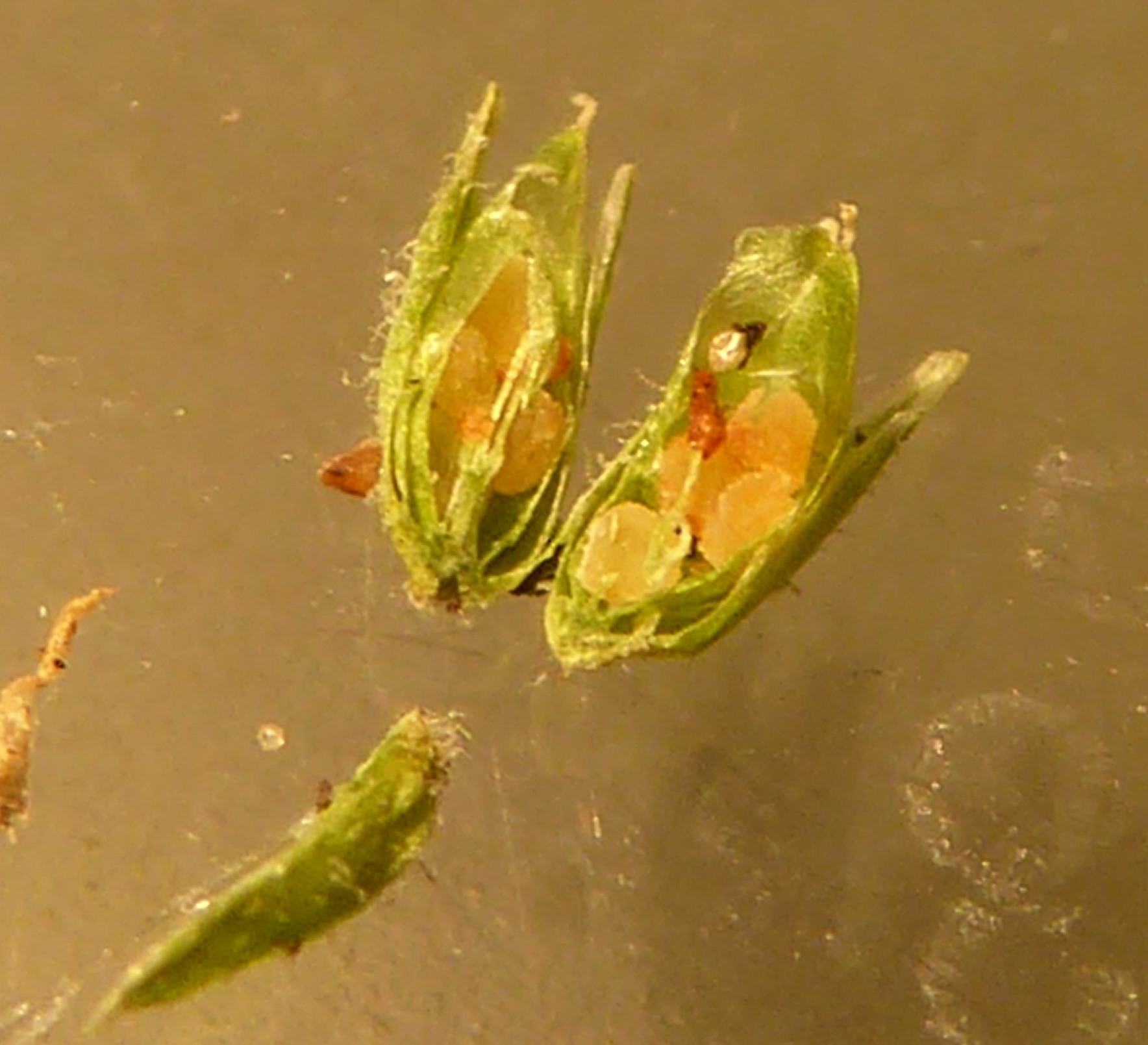
Fruits and seeds

== Distribution and status ==
Stellaria apetala has a widespread, though local, distribution across Europe, from southern Spain and the Mediterranean islands to Lapland, and from the British Isles to Ukraine. In North America it is found as an introduced species from Ontario, Canada, to Mexico and throughout the United States, from the east coast (Virginia, North and South Carolina, and Florida) to the west coast (California and Washington). It is also established in many other countries worldwide.

In the European Union its threat status has not yet been evaluated, but in Britain it has been designated Least Concern.

== Habitat and ecology ==
The main habitat for this species is in sandy and gravelly grassland close to the shore. It grows on well-drained soils and is able to withstand a fair amount of trampling and grazing. Away from the sea it occurs in sandy areas and is found on woodland rides, waste ground and eroded hillsides. In Europe it is often found growing under the shade of Scots Pine in woodland on light glacial sands, whereas in Britain it often occurs in the distinctive U1 Rumex acetosella grassland, where it is sometimes considered an axiophyte of species-rich habitat.

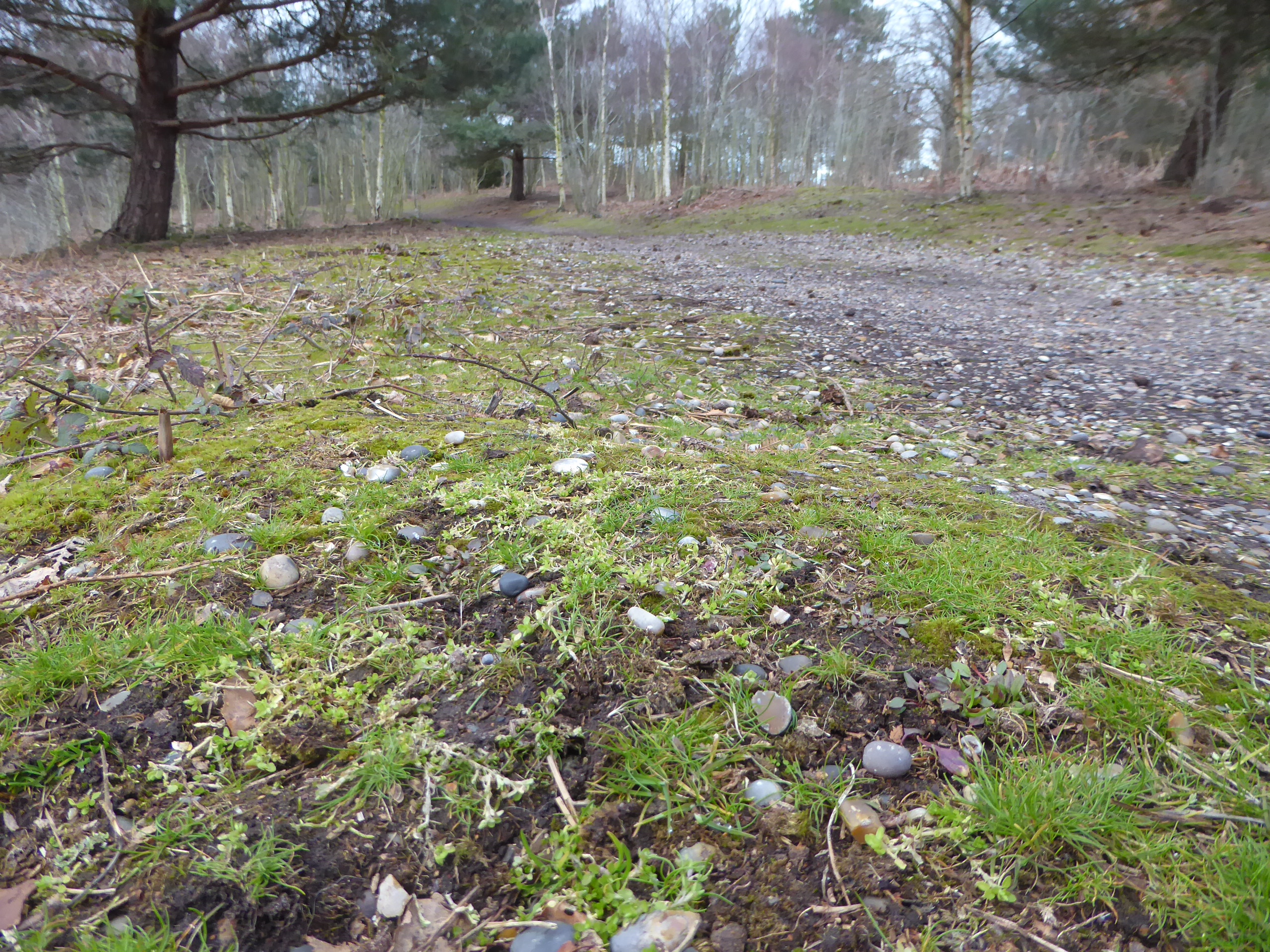
Lightly trampled woodland rides are a typical habitat.

Its Ellenberg values in Britain are L = 7, F = 4, R = 4, N = 4, and S = 0, which signifies a brightly lit situation with dry, somewhat acidic soil, low fertility and no salt.

The flowers are cleistogamous and are not visited by pollinating insects. The UK's Database of Insects and their Food Plants lists no species that feed on lesser chickweed, although there are several Diptera and other insects which are known to attack chickweeds (Stellaria spp.) generally.

Two species of fungi have been recorded on lesser chickweed in Europe: Peronospora alsinearum is a downy mildew and Puccinia arenariae creates pustules on the leaves.
