= Candelariella rubrisoli =

Scientific classification
- Kingdom: Fungi
- Division: Ascomycota
- Class: Candelariomycetes
- Order: Candelariales
- Family: Candelariaceae
- Genus: Candelariella
- Species: C. rubrisoli

Binomial name
- Candelariella rubrisoli D.Liu & Hur (2019)

Synonyms
- Opeltiella rubrisoli (D.Liu & Hur) S.Y.Kondr. (2020)

Species of lichen

Candelariella rubrisoli is a sorediate, corticolous (bark-dwelling) crustose lichen in the family Candelariaceae. It was described in 2019 from Yunnan, China; the specific epithet refers to the red soils of the type locality. Subsequent work combining morphology with DNA sequence data has shown that C. rubrisoli is also widespread in Europe and that many European records previously using the name C. xanthostigmoides actually belong here. The species forms tiny yellow-green patches that break into powdery propagules called soredia (microscopic clumps of algal cells wrapped in fungal threads used for asexual dispersal). When fertile, its spore sacs (asci) usually contain eight spores, a point of difference from similar species with many-spored asci.

== Taxonomy ==
Candelariella rubrisoli was described by Dong Liu and Jae-Seoun Hur in 2019 from bark of Pinus armandii near Huagou Village, Dongchuan District, Yunnan. It was transferred to Opeltiella in 2020 as O. rubrisoli, but an integrative study in 2025 treated it within Candelariella in the strict sense (sensu stricto) alongside sorediate bark-dwelling members of the genus and clarified application of names in Europe. In that study, European and Asian material of C. rubrisoli formed a well-supported group in internal transcribed spacer (ITS) rDNA analyses, split into two subclades. Despite genetic divergence (roughly 93–95% ITS similarity between subclades), no consistent morphological or ecological differences were found, and the authors adopted a broad species concept pending further multi-locus work.

== Description ==
The thallus of C. rubrisoli is areolate—broken into small "islands" (areoles)—that are often well developed and slightly lifted so as to appear somewhat scale-like (subsquamulose). Areoles are green to green-yellow, commonly ascending, to about 0.35 mm across, with a thin cortex about 10 micrometres (μm) thick. Powder-producing patches (soralia) arise from the areoles; they begin as small, convex, sharply delimited spots (roughly 0.15–0.35 mm) that can merge with age but usually do not form the extensive continuous powdery crusts seen in some related species. Soredia are fine (about 20–50 μm in diameter), yellow, and consist of 5–15 algal cells surrounded by slightly elongated fungal cells; the photobiont is chlorococcoid (about 6–15 μm).

Fruiting bodies (apothecia) are infrequent and small (about 0.3–0.5 μm). They are lecanorine in form (rimmed by tissue of the thallus itself) with a flat yellow-orange disc; a thin thalline rim may become obscure in older apothecia. In section, the rim shows an indistinct cortex of near-isodiametric cells; the proper excipulum is well developed. The hymenium is about 65–75 μm tall; paraphyses are mostly simple with slender tips. Asci are club-shaped (clavate) and (4–)8-spored, and the ascospores are simple (rarely thinly septate), narrowly ellipsoid, about 11–18 × 5.5–7.0 μm. Reported chemistry includes calycin and pulvinic acid derivatives.

== Habitat and distribution ==
Candelariella rubrisoli grows on trunks and twigs of a wide range of trees in both open landscapes and forests. Well-developed fertile material (i.e., with apothecia) has mostly been found on half-shaded bark, often of Salix, in humid deciduous woodland. Robust sterile thalli also occur on more exposed bark in open sites.

The species is known from Asia (China) and is widespread in Europe, with records from Austria, the Czech Republic, Denmark, Germany, the Netherlands and Sweden; material from Switzerland and Ukraine likewise appears to belong here. European use of the name C. xanthostigmoides for eight-spored, sorediate, bark-dwelling Candelariella has been shown to refer largely to C. rubrisoli; there is currently no evidence that C. xanthostigmoides occurs in Europe.

== Similar species ==
Sterile, sorediate yellow Candelariella on bark can be difficult to name with certainty. In practice, C. rubrisoli tends to have more conspicuous, often greener areoles and discrete soralia that are less prone to coalesce into a continuous crust. Candelariella efflorescens usually has very fine soredia that quickly blanket the thallus and, when fertile, multispored asci (typically 24–30 spores), whereas C. rubrisoli is eight-spored. Where diagnostic features such as spore number cannot be observed, some collections remain ambiguous.
