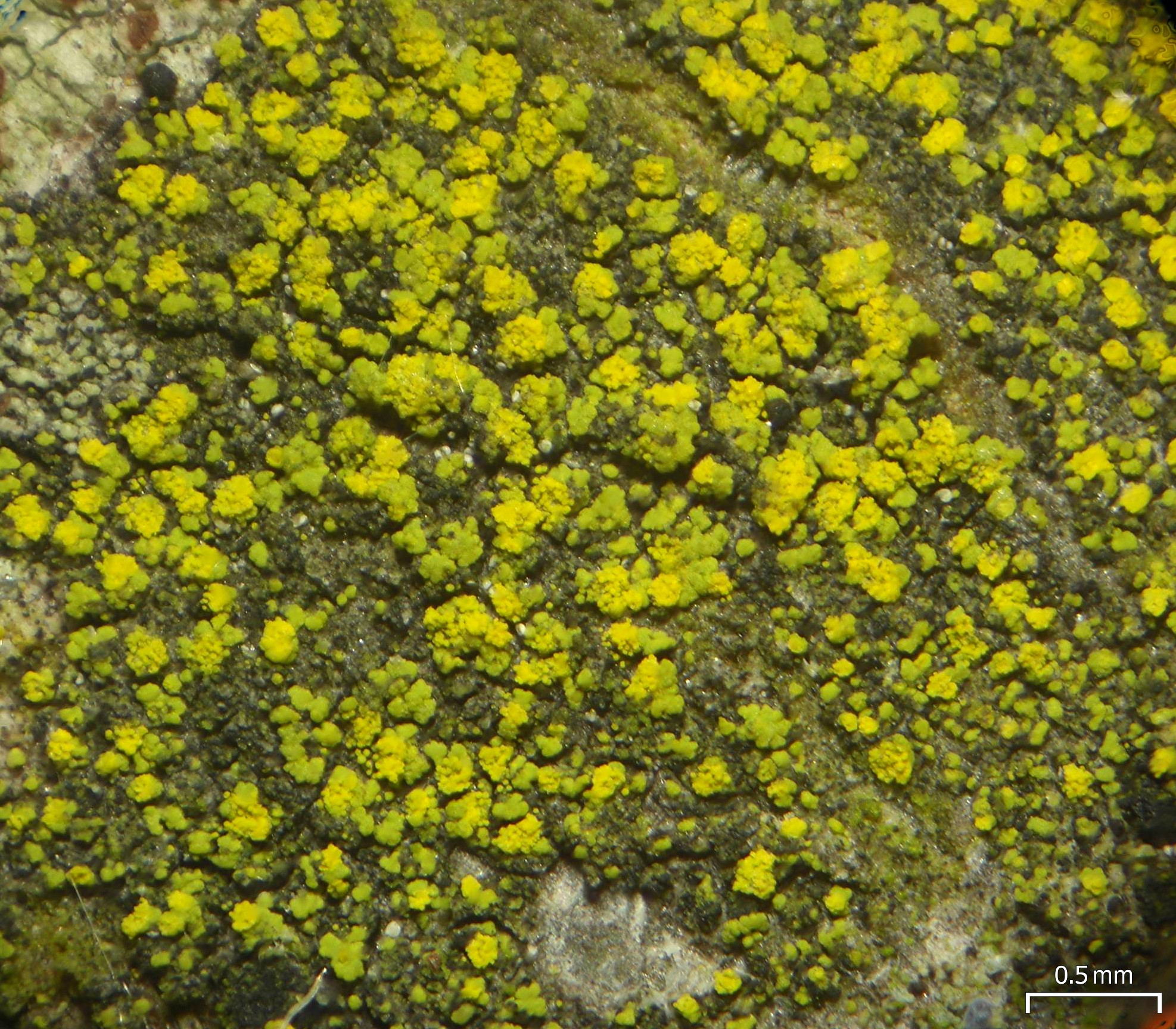

Scientific classification
- Kingdom: Fungi
- Division: Ascomycota
- Class: Candelariomycetes
- Order: Candelariales
- Family: Candelariaceae
- Genus: Candelariella
- Species: C. xanthostigmoides

Binomial name
- Candelariella xanthostigmoides (Müll.Arg.) R.W.Rogers (1982)

Synonyms
- Lecanora xanthostigmoides Müll.Arg. (1882); Candelaria xanthostigmoides (Müll.Arg.) Müll.Arg. (1893); Placodium xanthostigmoides (Müll.Arg.) Gyeln. (1933); Candelariella makarevichiae S.Y.Kondr., Lőkös & J.-S.Hur (2018); Candelariella subsquamulosa D.Liu & J.-S.Hur (2019)

= Candelariella xanthostigmoides =

Species of lichen

Candelariella xanthostigmoides is a sorediate, corticolous (bark-dwelling) crustose lichen in the family Candelariaceae. Typical thalli consist of small, deep-yellow patches that break into powdery propagules called soredia—microscopic clumps of algal cells bound by fungal filaments that serve for asexual dispersal. Apothecia (disc-like fruiting bodies) are uncommon; when present, the spore sacs (asci) are eight-spored. The species is known from Australia, Asia (including Japan and South Korea), North America and South America (Argentina). European records formerly using this name have been shown to represent Candelariella rubrisoli instead.

== Taxonomy ==
Johannes Müller Argoviensis formally described the species in 1882 as Lecanora xanthostigmoides from bark in Australia; it was later combined in Candelaria (1893) and Placodium (1933) before Roderick Westgarth Rogers placed it in Candelariella in 1982. An integrative study of sorediate, bark-dwelling Candelariella species using morphology and internal transcribed spacer (ITS) rDNA data treated C. xanthostigmoides as one of three eight-spored species worldwide, alongside C. reflexa and C. rubrisoli, and clarified application of names in Europe. That study further concluded that the names C. makarevichiae (2018) and C. subsquamulosa (2019) fall within the variation of C. xanthostigmoides and should be regarded as synonyms.

== Description ==
The thallus of C. xanthostigmoides is areolate—that is, broken into small "islands" (areoles)—which are scattered to aggregated, often becoming slightly raised so as to appear shallowly scale-like (subsquamulose). Areoles are green-yellow to yellow, sometimes notched (incised), measuring to about 0.3 mm across. Powder-producing patches (soralia) originate in the areoles; they begin as small, convex, sharply delimited spots roughly 0.15–0.35 mm in diameter that may merge in older material but usually do not form extensive, continuous powdery crusts. Soredia are fine (about 25–45 μm), bright yellow; the photobiont consists of round green algal cells (roughly 8–13 μm).

Apothecia are infrequent and small (about 0.2–0.4 mm), lecanorine in form (rimmed by thallus tissue) with a flat yellow-orange disc and a thin yellow margin that can become indistinct in older apothecia. Published anatomical details are incomplete, but the hymenium is reported to be colourless, up to about 70 μm tall. Asci are eight-spored; ascospores are colourless, simple, narrowly ellipsoid, and measure roughly 11–16 × 4–6 μm.

== Habitat and distribution ==
Candelariella xanthostigmoides occurs mainly on bark and twigs of deciduous trees, but it also grows on conifers; it is occasionally found on wood or stone. It favours well-lit bark but can occur in both open sites and woodland settings.

The species is known from Australia, parts of Asia (Japan, South Korea), North America and Argentina in South America. In Europe, specimens once called C. xanthostigmoides have been re-identified as C. rubrisoli, and there is currently no evidence that C. xanthostigmoides occurs there.

== Similar species ==
Sterile sorediate yellow Candelariella on bark can be difficult to separate. C. xanthostigmoides typically shows deep-yellow areoles that produce bright yellow soredia and, when fertile, eight-spored asci. C. rubrisoli is also eight-spored but often has greener, more conspicuous areoles and soralia that are less prone to coalesce; Candelariella efflorescens usually develops finer soredia that soon blanket the surface and has many-spored asci. In practice, sterile material may remain ambiguous without DNA data or fertile structures.
