= Catagonium emarginatum =

Scientific classification
- Kingdom: Plantae
- Clade: Embryophytes
- Division: Bryophyta
- Class: Bryopsida
- Subclass: Bryidae
- Order: Hypnales
- Family: Catagoniaceae
- Genus: Catagonium
- Species: C. emarginatum

Binomial name
- Catagonium emarginatum S.H.Lin

Species of moss

Catagonium emarginatum is a species of moss from the genus Catagonium. It was discovered by Shan Hsiung Lin in Bolivia.
