= Carl Ernst August Weihe =

German botanist and physician

Carl Ernst August Weihe (1779–1834) was a German botanist and medical doctor.

Weihe was born on 30 January 1779 at Mennighüffen, the second of 12 children born to KarlJustus Weihe (1752–1829), a pastor, and his wife Anna (née Rebeker). As he later described himself as "Mindensis", it is probable that he received his schooling at the Gymnasium in Minden. Weihe was apprenticed to a pharmacist in Bielefeld, before attending the university at Halle, where he studied medicine and botany, receiving his doctorate in September 1802. He worked as a doctor at Lüttringhausen (near Remscheid) and Bünde, before moving back to Mennighüffen, where he established a small botanical garden on land owned by his father. In 1822, Weihe moved to Herford, where his children were at school, and where he died in 1834.

During his career Weihe described some 160 new plant species. In particular, he made important contributions to the study of the genus Rubus. Weihe was the first to realise that the bramble, Rubus fruticosus, was not in fact a single species but a complex of similar species; among specimens collected in the vicinity of his home at Mennighüffen he distinguished 18 separate species. Between 1822 and 1827, Weihe and his collaborator, Christian Gottfried Nees von Esenbeck, a taxonomic botanist, published a monograph of the German brambles, Rubi Germanici descripti et illustrati, in which they described 49 species of Rubus.

Between 1817 and 1830 Weihe issued the exsiccata Deutsche Gräser. Für Botaniker und Oekonomen getrocknet ....

The genus Weihea (now treated as a synonym of Geissorhiza) was named in his honour.
