= Louis Alexandre Henri Joseph Piré =

Belgian botanist (1827-1887)

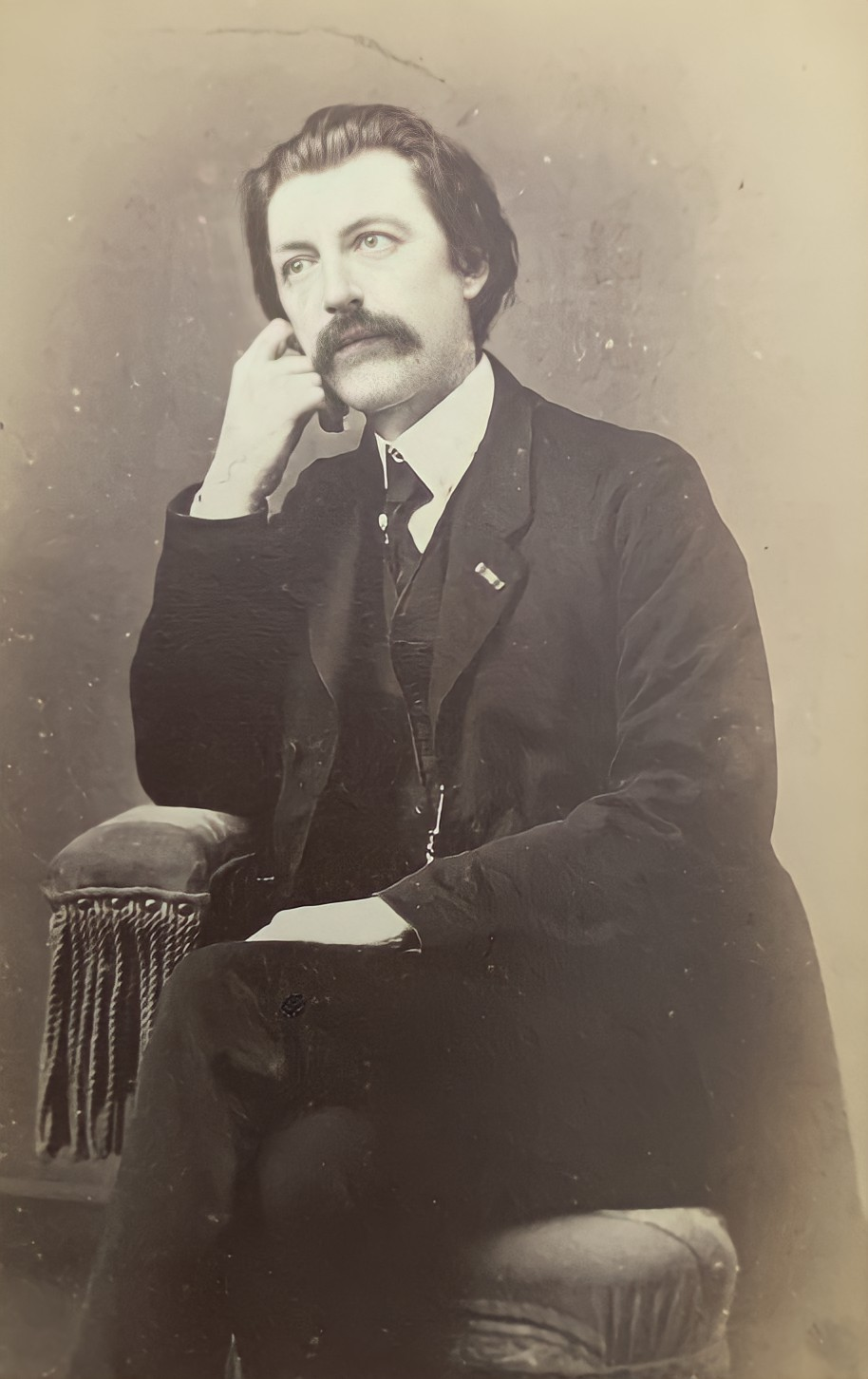
- Born: 3 March 1827
- Died: 16 July 1887 (aged 60)

Academic work
- Discipline: botany
- Institutions: Université Libre de Bruxelles
- Notable works: Les Mousses de la Belgique

Louis Alexandre Henri Joseph Piré (1827–1887) was a Belgian botanist. He held the position of Professor of Botany at the Université libre de Bruxelles. He issued the exsiccata Les Mousses de la Belgique (1870–1871).

== Works ==
- Flore analytique du centre de la Belgique (with Félix Muller) (Victor Devaux et Cie, Bruxelles,1866)
- Revue des mousses acrocarpes de la flore belge (C Annoot-Braeckman, Gand, 1869)
- Opuscules de botanique. II: Notice sur l'Alsine pallida Dmtr. (Bulletins de la Société royale de botanique de Belgique, tome II, n. 1)
- Opuscules de botanique. III: Deuxième herborisation de la Société royale de botanique de Belgique (Bulletins de la Société royale de botanique de Belgique, tome II, n. 3, Juin 1863)
- Opuscules de botanique. IV: Troisième herborisation de la Société royale de botanique de Belgique (Bulletins de la Société royale de botanique de Belgique, tome III, n. 3, Juillet 1864)
- Biographie de Charles Linné, a biography of Carl Von Linné, 1872
