= Irénée Thériot =

French botanist (1859-1947)

- Born: 21 December 1859
- Died: 25 March 1947 (aged 87)
- Occupation: school teacher
- Known for: study of mosses
- Scientific career
- Fields: bryology

Marie Hypolite Irénée Thériot, credited as Irénée Thériot (English: /tɛrˈjoʊ/, French: [iʁene teʁjo]; 21 December 1859 – 25 March 1947), was a French bryologist and school teacher.

He was orphaned as a child, trained as a teacher and became head of a school in Le Havre from 1888 until 1920. He married but his wife (died 1938) and son (died 1917, aged 30) pre-deceased him.

He was a member of the Société Botanique de France. He was particularly interested in mosses, which he studied in his spare time. He described over 1000 new species and genera. These came from many parts of the world, obtained by exchanging specimens with others. He continued to study mosses and liverworts, including using a microscope, into his early 80s. Thériot edited the exsiccata Musci et Hepaticae Novae-Caledoniae exsiccati.

Thériot's personal herbarium collection is currently housed at the Muséum national d'histoire naturelle. Jules Cardot named the genus Theriotia in honor of Thériot.

The standard author abbreviation Thér. is used to indicate this person as the author when citing a botanical name.

== Publications ==
He was the author or co-author of scientific publications and books about the floras of North America, Tunisia, China and New Caledonia. They include:

- The mosses of Alaska by J. Cardot and I. Thériot about collections made during the Jules Cardot and Harriman expedition to Alaska in 1899. Published as a book in 1904 (probably), from an initial publication in the Proceedings of the Washington Academy of Sciences in 1902 (volume 4, pages 293–372).
