= Christian Friedrich Schwägrichen =

German botanist

Christian Friedrich Schwägrichen (16 September 1775, Leipzig – 2 May 1853, Leipzig) was a German botanist specializing in the field of bryology.

In 1799, he obtained his medical doctorate from the University of Leipzig, where he was later an associate professor of natural history (1803–1815) and afterwards a full professor on the same subject (1815–1852). Concurrently, he served as an associate professor of botany (1807–1852) at Leipzig.

Prior to 1837, he was director of the botanical garden at Leipzig, being succeeded by Gustav Kunze, a specialist in the field of pteridology. Schwägrichen died on 2 May 1853 as the result of a fall down a flight of stairs.

He is the taxonomic authority of the bryophyte families Polytrichaceae and Funariaceae. The genus Schwaegrichenia and also a street in Leipzig's Musikviertel neighbourhood are named in his honour.

== Published works ==
- "Topographiae botanicae et entomologicae Lipsiensis", four volumes, (1799-1806).
- "Joannis Hedwig...species muscorum frondosorum descriptae et tabulis aeneis lxxvii coloratis illustratae /opus posthumum, editum a Friderico Schwaegrichen". Lipsiae (Leipzig) : sumtu J. A. Barthii; Parisiis, A. Koenig, 1801. (as editor, main author Johann Hedwig).
  - "Catalogue of the Hedwig-Schwägrichen Herbarium (G)". by Michelle J Price, (2005).
- Leitfaden zum Unterrichte in der Naturgeschichte für Schulen, two volumes, (1803) - Guide towards the teaching of natural history in schools.
- Anleitung zum Studium der Botanik, Leipzig (1806) - Guide to studies of botany.
- "Historiae muscorum hepaticorum prodromus", Leipzig (1814).

In 1873, J. B. Calmet edited an exsiccata work with the title Moussier de Schwaegrichen ... Fac-simile du recueil et de la correspondence inédite de Schwaegrichen, conservés dans le cabinet de M. Casimir Roumeguère.
