= Robert Statham Williams =

American botanist (1859–1945)

- Robert S. Williams
- Born: May 6, 1859; Minneapolis, Minnesota
- Died: March 14, 1945 (aged 85); Minneapolis, Minnesota
- Scientific career
- Fields: Bryology
- Institutions: New York Botanical Garden
- Author abbrev. (botany): R.S.Williams

Robert Statham Williams (May 6, 1859 – March 14, 1945) was an American bryologist who specialized in the mosses of the Yukon and South America. The standard author abbreviation R.S.Williams is used to indicate this person as the author when citing a botanical name.

== Early life ==
Williams was born in Minneapolis, Minnesota on May 6, 1859. Since childhood, he had always been interested in natural history, particularly in birds and plants. As a teen, he published a series of nature columns in a Minneapolis newspaper. Williams, captivated by ornithology, prepared an almost complete set of taxidermied skins of birds from Minnesota. He sold his collection to the Minnesota Museum of Natural History to fund his later explorations, a decision which he regretted later in life.

== Career ==
In 1879, at the age of 20, Williams moved from his hometown of Minneapolis, Minnesota to Montana. Here, he made a living working as a miner, businessman, and explorer. Williams lived as a homesteader, and built the first cabin in what became the city of Great Falls, Montana. While living in Montana, Columbia College, on behalf of Elizabeth Britton, gave Williams a grant to collect bryophytes in the area.

In 1898, Williams followed the Klondike Gold Rush, taking the Chilkoot Trail to the Yukon. Williams conducted business rather than searching for gold, which earned him a small fortune. In his spare time, he began to collect plants. The specimens he gathered during 1898 and 1899 represent the first extensive collections made in the Klondike.

In 1899, Williams traveled to New York. He arrived at the New York Botanical Garden with his plant collections and determinations, and was hired as a museum aide by Nathaniel Britton. It was at that time that he distributed the exsiccata series Mosses From Montana Collected by R. S. Williams 1896. In 1901, under direction of Henry Hurd Rusby, Williams was sent to Bolivia and Peru. He worked as a botanist for an exploration party, collecting seeds and materials from more than 200 species of vascular plants found in the Amazon basin for use by the Garden. He also collected moss specimens for his personal research.

In 1903, he was sent to the Philippines to collect specimens on the islands of Luzon and Mindanao. He returned in 1905. His last expedition was to Panama in 1908. He also collected specimens of exotic and local birds, many of which are now in the collection of the American Museum of Natural History.

In 1906, he was named assistant curator of the New York Botanical Garden, and in 1910, he advanced to administrative assistant. From 1924 to 1930, he served as president of the Sullivant Moss Society. In 1932, his title became research assistant in bryology at the New York Botanical Garden. In 1936, he took a permanent leave of absence from the garden and returned to his childhood home in Minneapolis, where he remained until his death.

== Legacy ==
A genus of flowering plants, Williamsia (syn. Praravinia), and two genera of mosses, Williamsia and Williamsiella (both syn. of Leptodontium), were named in his honor. Several species of flowering plants from areas of his expeditions also bear his name.

== Selected publications ==
- Williams, Robert Statham (1899). "Botanical notes on the way to Dawson, Alaska". Plant World. 2: 177–181.
- Williams, Robert Statham (1901). "Contributions to the botany of the Yukon Territory. 2. An enumeration of the mosses collected". Bull. N. Y. Bot. Gard. 2: 105–148.
- Williams, Robert Statham (1901). Bolivia, 1901-1902. New York Botanical Garden.
- Williams, Robert Statham (1903). New Or Interesting Mosses from Panama. Smithsonian Institution.
- Williams, Robert Statham (1903). "A collecting trip to Bolivia". The Plant World. 6 (6): 132–135. JSTOR 43477187.
- Williams, Robert Statham (1903). "Bolivian mosses. Part I." Bull. N. Y. Bot. Gard. 3: 104–134.
- Williams, Robert Statham (1909). "Bolivian mosses. Part II". Bull. N. Y. Bot. Gard. 6: 227–261.
- Williams, Robert Statham (1914). Philippine Mosses. New York Botanical Garden.

== See also ==
- Category:Taxa named by Robert Statham Williams
