= Edwin Bunting Bartram =

American botanist and bryologist (1878-1964)

- Born: July 28, 1878
- Died: December 2, 1964 (aged 86); Bushkill, Pennsylvania, US
- Board member of: Academy of Natural Sciences; Philadelphia Botanical Club; Torrey Botanical Club; Sullivant Moss Society; British Bryological Society
- Scientific career
- Fields: Botany, Bryology
- Author abbrev. (botany): E.B.Bartram

Edwin Bunting Bartram (July 28, 1878 – December 2, 1964) was an American botanist and bryologist. He described many dozens of new species in bryology, and contributed 143 works, including a number of books. He was a member of the Academy of Natural Sciences, Philadelphia Botanical Club, Torrey Botanical Club, New England Botanical Club, Sullivant Moss Society and British Bryological Society.

His collections and publications contributed to the growth of the Farlow Herbarium of Cryptogamic Botany. The Academy of Natural Sciences of Drexel University in Philadelphia also preserves some of his collected specimens. He contributed 143 publications, including several books, to bryology.
