= Jules Cardot =

French botanist (1860–1934)

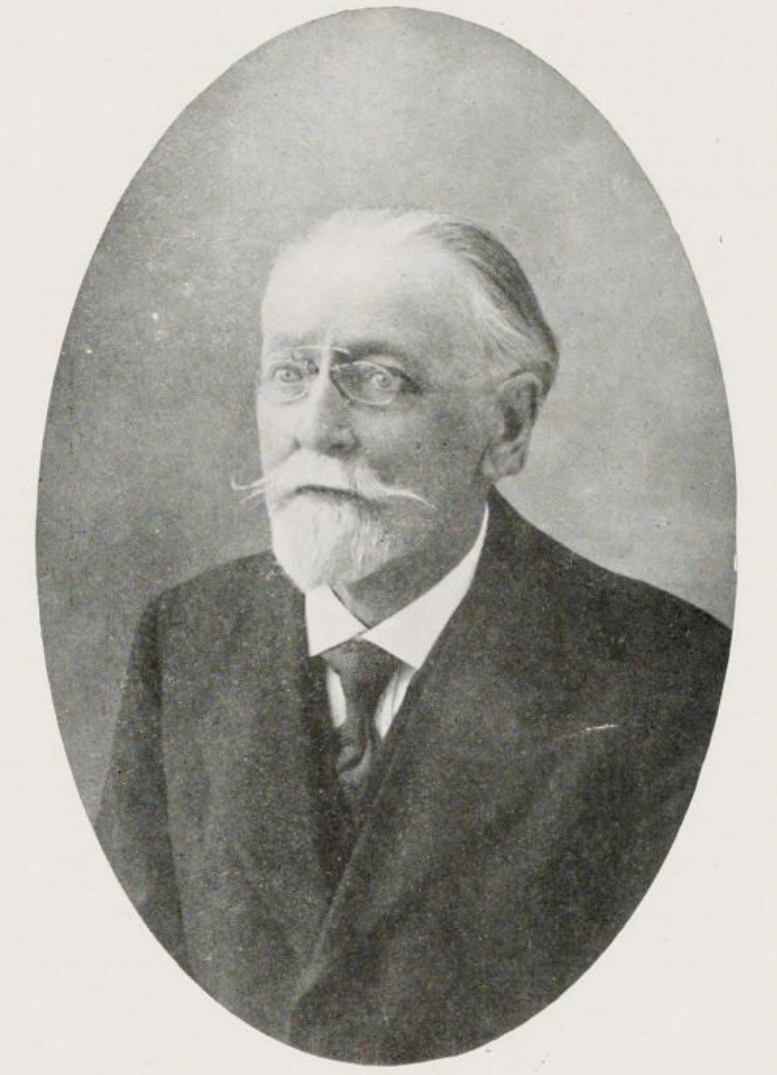
- Born: 18 August 1860
- Died: 22 November 1934; Charleville
- Occupations: Botanist; botanical collector; scientific collector
- Spouse: Marie Cardot
- Awards: Chevalier of the Legion of Honour
- Scientific career
- Fields: Botany, bryology, moss
- Author abbrev. (botany): Cardot

Signature
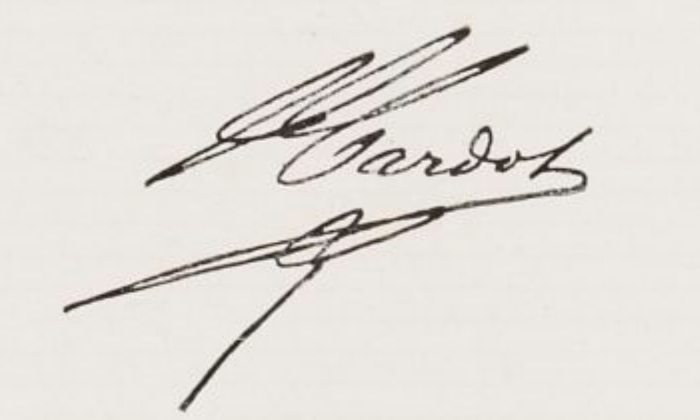

Jules Cardot (French: [ʒyl kaʁdo]; 18 August 1860 – 22 November 1934) was a French botanist and bryologist considered in his time one of the world's leading experts on the mosses of Antarctica.

He was the son-in-law of botanist Louis Piré. His collection of herbarium specimens at his laboratories in Charleville was heavily looted and damaged during World War I. The French Academy of Sciences awarded the 1893 "Prix Montague" to Cardot for his work on mosses. Cardot named 40 genera and 1200 species.

== Works ==
- Cardot, J. Nouvelle contribution à la flore bryologique des îles atlantiques. // Bull.Herb.Boissier.Sér.2., Geneva. Impr. Romanet. Vol. v (2). Feb. 1905

With Ferdinand Renauld he edited and distributed two exsiccata series, namely Musci Americae Septentrionalis exsiccati and (1892-1908) and Musci Europaei exsiccati (? 1902-1908).
