= Viktor Ferdinand Brotherus =

Finnish botanist (1849–1929)

- Born: 28 October 1849; Sund, Åland
- Died: 9 February 1929 (aged 79)
- Scientific career
- Fields: Bryology
- Author abbrev. (botany): Broth.

Viktor Ferdinand Brotherus (28 October 1849 – 9 February 1929) was a Finnish botanist who studied the mosses (Bryophyta). He is best known for authoring the treatment of 'Musci' in Engler and Prantl's Die Naturlichen Pflanzenfamilien.

== Personal life ==
Brotherus was born in Skarpans in Sund, Åland while Finland was under Russian rule. He had 13 brothers and sisters of whom six died young.

He took his Candidate of Philosophy degree in 1870 at Imperial Alexander University (later University of Helsinki) and began medical studies but gave them up after getting blood poisoning and became a teacher. He married Aline Mathilde Sandman (born 1853), daughter of Jonas Sandman, a Justice in the Court of Appeal, in 1879 at the age of thirty, and had four children. She died in 1894. He did not remarry.

He taught natural history and mathematics at the Swedish girls' school in Vaasa City from 1878 to 1917, carrying on his career as a botanist in parallel. At his funeral, his grand-nephew describes:

"Foreign guests arrived to his funeral, he was praised in the funeral orations, last respects were read from distant lands. The staff of the school was astonished. They had no idea that he was also something else but their dear old junior lecturer [original in Finnish]."

== Biological works ==
His earliest major work was on the moss flora of the Kola Peninsula (Brotherus and T. Saelan. 1890. Musci Lapponiae Kolaensis. Acta Societas pro Flora et Flora Fennica 6: 1-100.) His other major European work was Die Laubmoose Fennoskandias (1923). He also studied, through collections sent to him by botanists abroad, the mosses of Turkmenistan, Africa, Australia, Brazil, and New Guinea, among others, and was known as an authority on extra-European mosses. His work on the Musci of Die Natürlichen Pflanzenfamilien covered Archidiales, Andreaeales, and Bryales, and continued to the second edition.

By invitation of Heinrich von Handel-Mazzetti, he authored the section on Chinese mosses in the Symbolae Sinicae. His collaborations and correspondence with other bryologists of the day were extensive. In particular, he was well acquainted with Max Fleischer, and used Fleischer's new 'natural' system of moss classification, which was outlined in the latter's Die Musci der Flora von Buitenzorg, in his own systematic description of the mosses in Die Naturlichen Pflanzenfamilien. Brotherus's unique achievement was his synthesis of moss taxonomy for the world-wide distribution, and his mastery of the identification and classification of the estimated 20 000 species of mosses then known to him.

== Miscellaneous ==
Brotherus's personal herbarium (comprising 120 000 moss specimens), in particular the extra-European collections, was purchased by the University of Helsinki herbarium (H) and is maintained as a separate collection (H-BR).

He published several exsiccatae, among others the series Bryotheca Fennica and Musci Turkestanici. The specimens are deposited in major herbaria around the world (e.g. B, BM, FH, K, L, M, P). The standard botanical abbreviation of his name is Broth. The journal Bryobrothera, published by the Finnish Bryological Society, is named in his honor. Numerous genera and species of mosses, e.g. Brothera, Brotherella, Brotherobryum, are named for him. Members of his family (see Brotherus) are still resident in Finland today.
