= William Russel Buck =

American bryologist

- Born: December 27, 1950 (age 75); Jacksonville, Florida, United States of America
- Scientific career
- Fields: Bryology
- Author abbrev. (botany): W.R.Buck

William Russel Buck (born December 27, 1950) is an American bryologist.

The standard author abbreviation W.R.Buck is used to indicate this person as the author when citing a botanical name.

Buck received both his Bachelor's and Master's degrees at the University of Florida, in 1972 and 1974, respectively. In 1979, he completed his PhD at the University of Michigan in Ann Arbor.

Since 1979, Buck has worked at the New York Botanical Garden. He became the curator for bryophytes in 1986, and senior curator in 2000. Since 1986, he has also been an adjunct professor at the City University of New York.

== Publications ==
- Buck, W. R., Vitt, D. H. (1986) Suggestions for a new familial classification of pleurocarpous mosses. Taxon 35 (1): 21–60.
- Buck, W. R., Goffinet, B. (2000) Morphology and classification of mosses. pp. 71–123 in Shaw, A. J. & B. Goffinet (eds.) Bryophyte Biology, 1st ed. Cambridge University Press. ISBN 0-521-66097-1
- Buck, W. R., Cox, C. J., Shaw, J., Goffinet, B. (2004) Ordinal relationships of pleurocarpous mosses, with special emphasis on the Hookeriales. Systematics and Biodiversity 2: 121–145.
- Goffinet, B., Buck, W. R. (2004) Systematics of the Bryophyta (Mosses): From molecules to a revised classification. Monographs in Systematic Botany [Molecular Systematics of Bryophytes] 98: 205–239. ISBN 1-930723-38-5
- Goffinet, B., Buck, W. R., Shaw, A. J. (2008) Morphology and Classification of the Bryophyta. pp. 55–138 in Goffinet, B. & J. Shaw (eds.) Bryophyte Biology, 2nd ed. Cambridge University Press.
- Goffinet, B., Buck, W. R., Shaw, A. J. (2012) Classification of the Bryophyta (efter Goffinet, Buck, & Shaw, 2008)

He edited the exsiccata Bryophytorum Typorum Exsiccata (1981-1985), distributed by The New York Botanical Garden.

== See also ==
- Category:Taxa named by William Russel Buck
