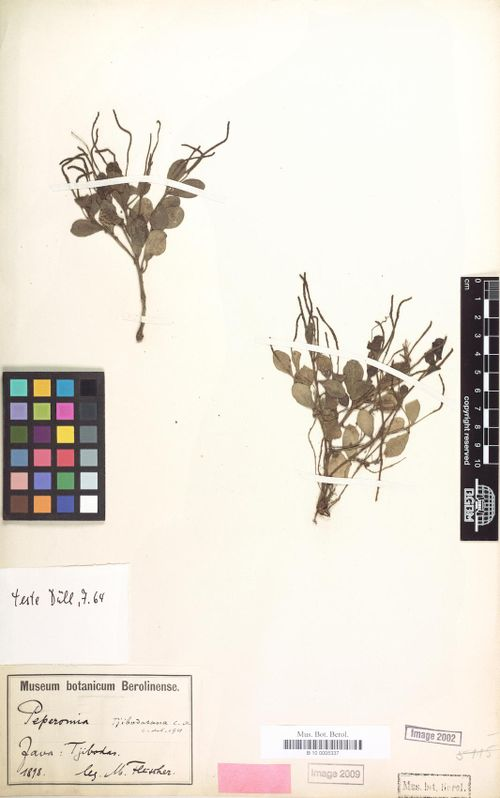

Scientific classification
- Kingdom: Plantae
- Clade: Tracheophytes
- Clade: Angiosperms
- Clade: Magnoliids
- Order: Piperales
- Family: Piperaceae
- Genus: Peperomia
- Species: P. tjibodasana

Binomial name
- Peperomia tjibodasana C.DC.

= Peperomia tjibodasana =

Species of flowering plant

Peperomia tjibodasana is a species of flowering plant in the genus Peperomia. It primarily grows on wet tropical biomes. Its conservation status is Threatened.

== Taxonomy and naming ==
It was described in 1909 by Casimir de Candolle in "Verhandelingen der Koninklijke Akademie van Wetenschappen te Amsterdam", from collected specimens by Max Fleischer in 1818. It gets its name from Tjibodas, where first specimens were collected.

== Distribution and habitat ==
It is endemic to Java.
