= Dieng temples =

Hindu temple in Indonesia

Coordinates: 7.2°S 109.9°E

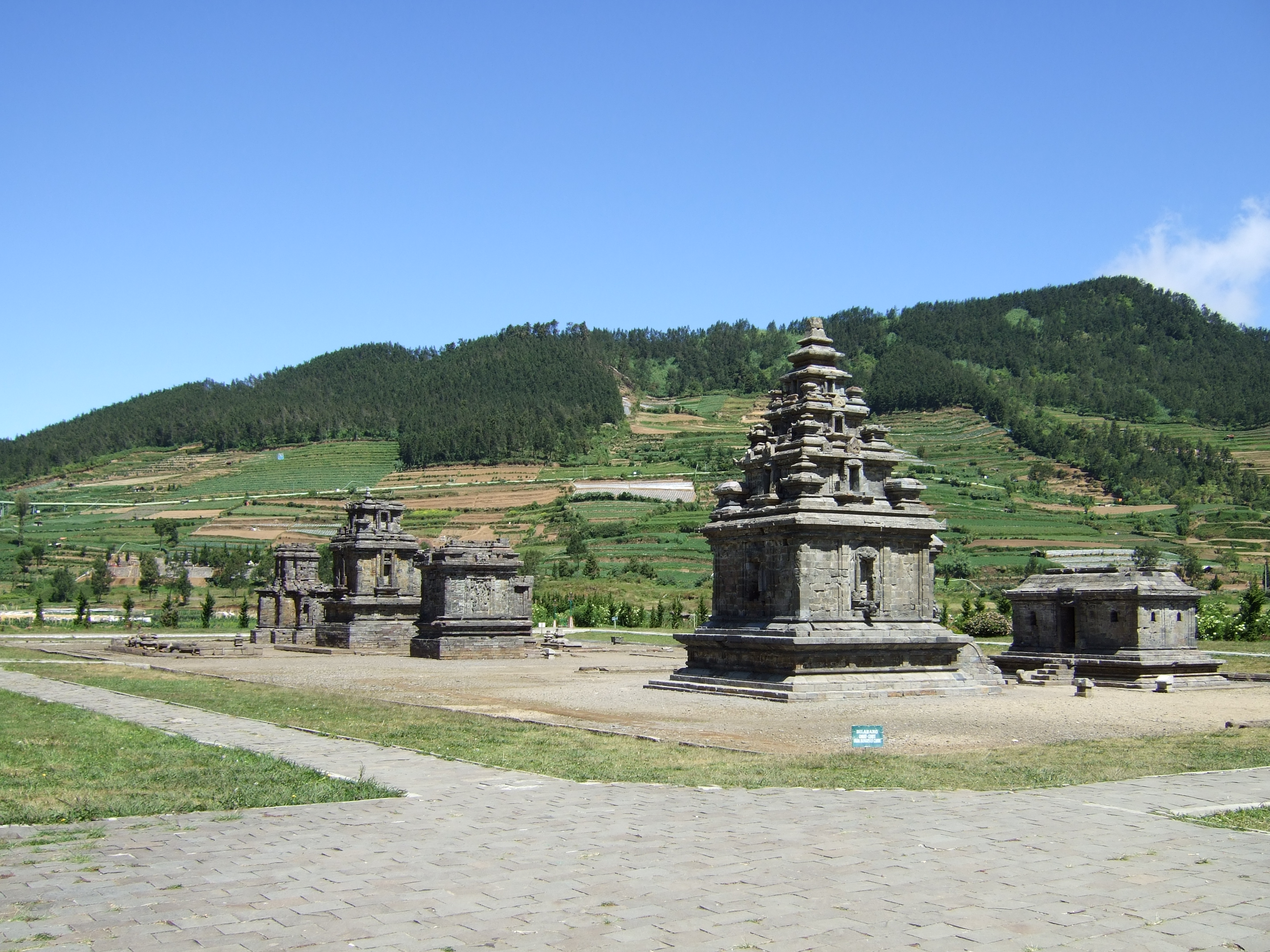
Dieng temple compound, the Arjuna temple nearest.

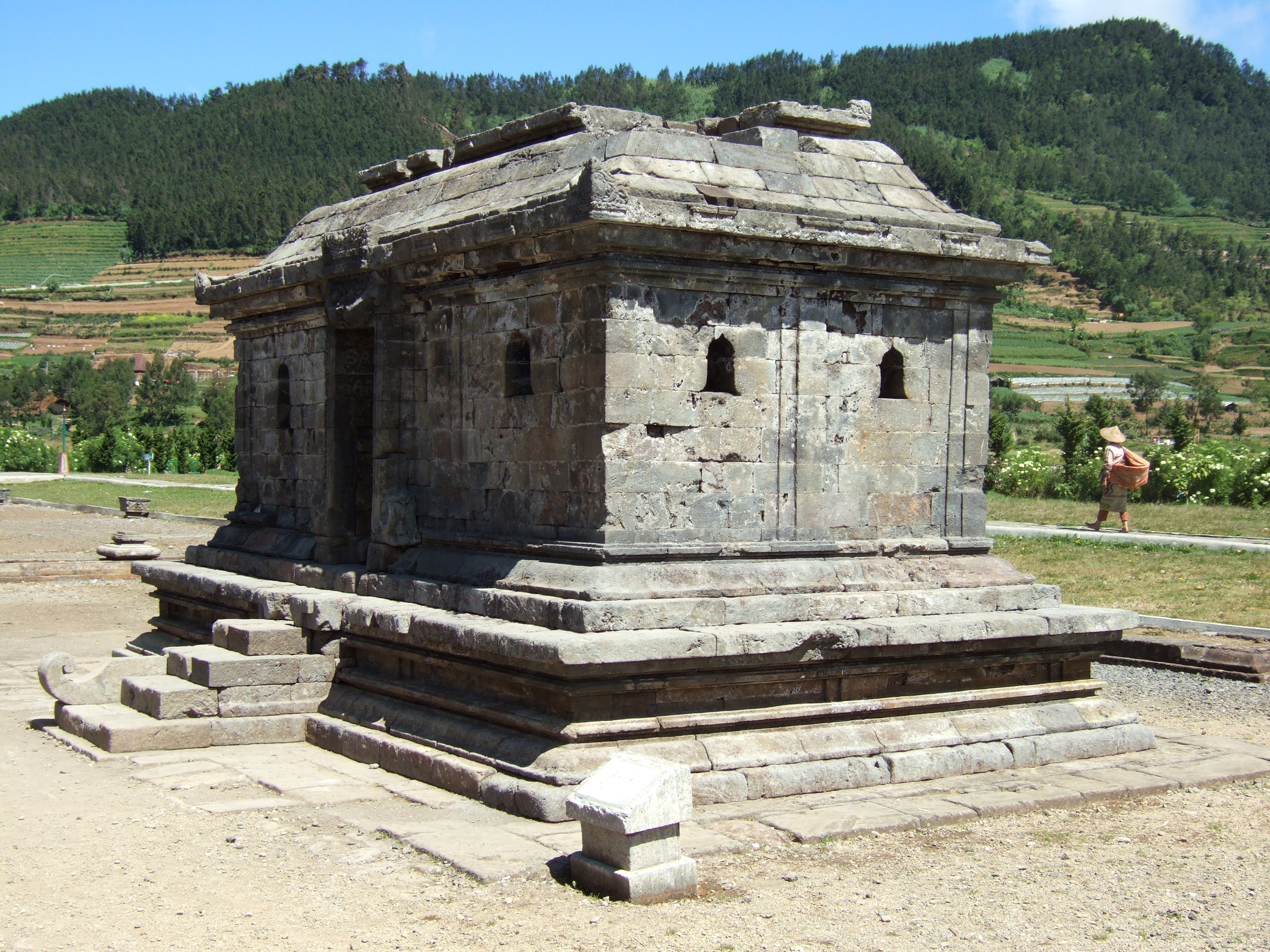
Semar temple

Dieng temples (Indonesian: Candi Dieng) are a group of 7th and/or eighth-century Hindu candi or temple compounds located in Dieng Plateau, near Banjarnegara, Central Java, Indonesia. These edifices originate from the Kalingga Kingdom. The plateau is home to eight small Hindu temples that are among the oldest surviving religious structures ever built in Java and the earliest Hindu temples in Indonesia. The temples show many features of Indian Hindu temple architecture.

The real name of the temples, the history, and the king responsible for the construction of these temples were unknown. This is because of the scarcity of data and inscriptions connected to the construction of these temples. The local Javanese population named each temple according to Javanese wayang characters, mostly taken from the Mahabharata epic.

The Kailasa museum nearby contains many pieces of sculpture removed from the temples.

== History ==
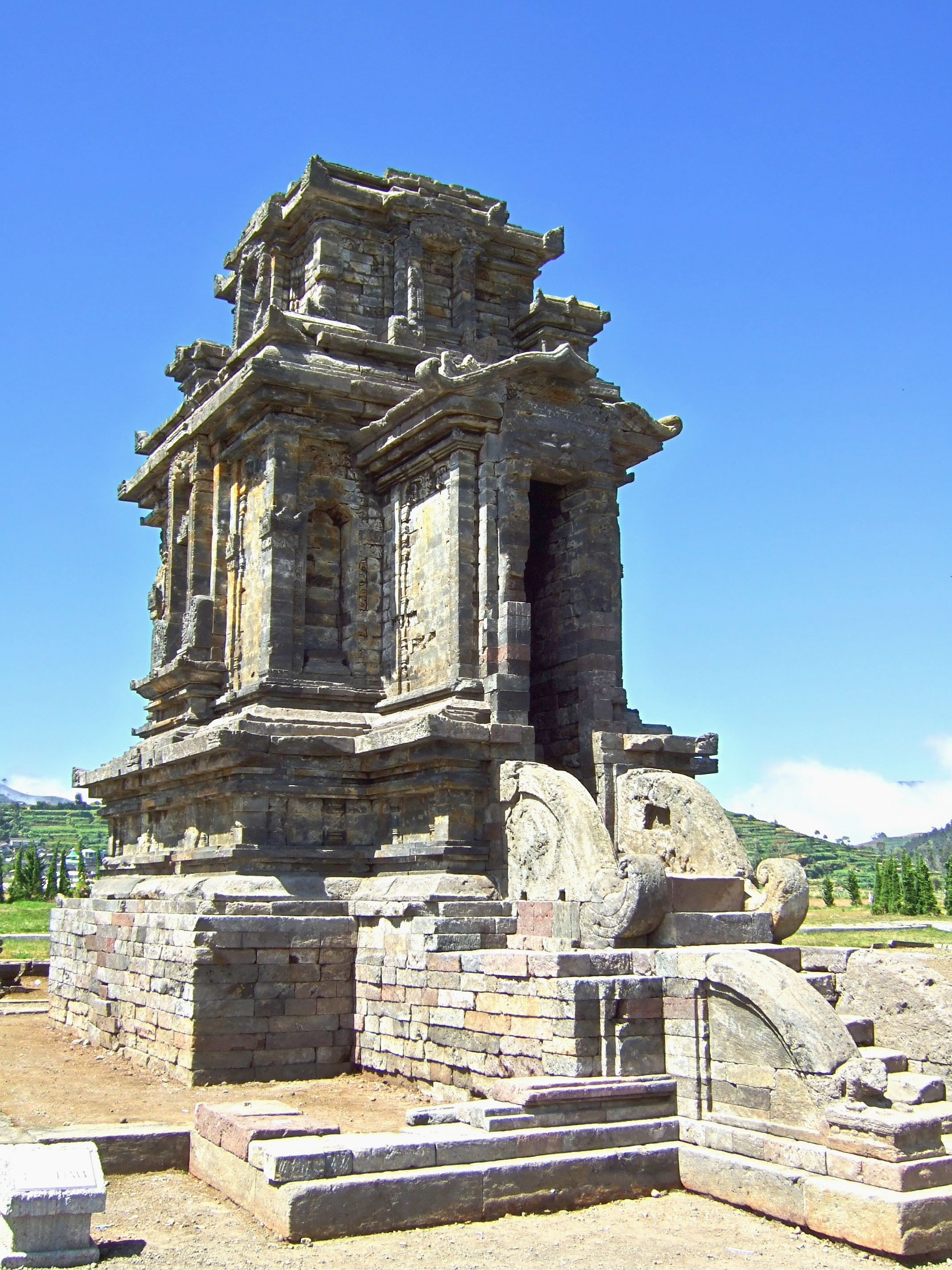
The Candi Puntadewa

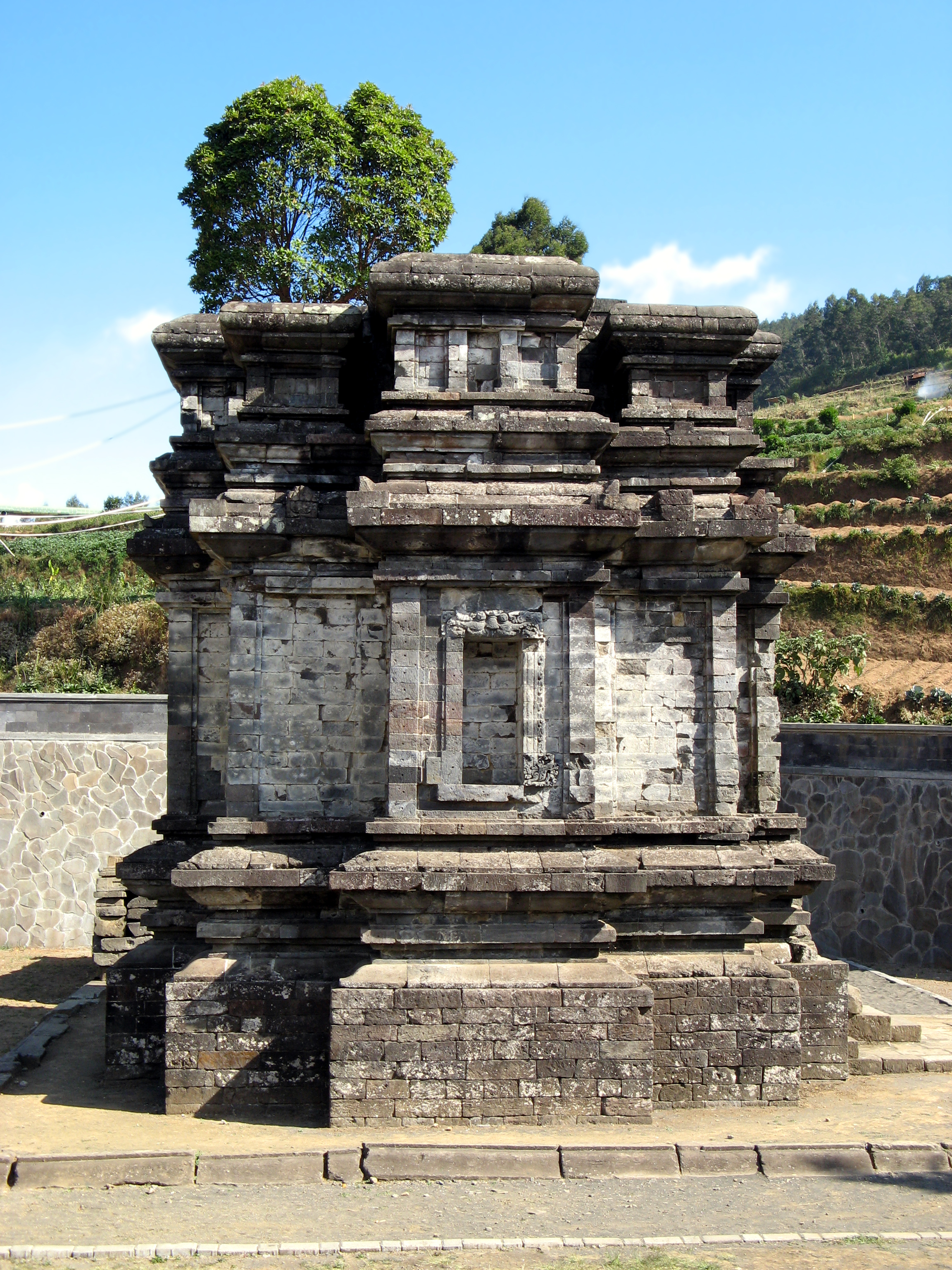
The Candi Gatokaca

It is unclear when they were built, and were estimated to range from mid 7th century to the end of the 8th century CE; they are the oldest known standing stone structures in Central Java. They are originally thought to have numbered 400 but only eight remain after local farmers removed stone following the draining of the lake in the 19th century.

Examining the Javanese temple architectural styles, archaeologists grouped the Dieng temples within the Northern Central Javanese style, together with Gedong Songo temples, and to some extent also includes the East Javanese Badut temple, and West Javanese Cangkuang and Bojongmenje temple, and suggested that all of these temples are built within the same period, ranges from 7th to 8th century. An inscription discovered near Arjuna temple in Dieng was dated circa 808-809 CE, it was the oldest surviving specimen of old Javanese script, which revealed that the Dieng temple was continuously inhabited from mid 7th to early 9th century.

The Dieng temples were rediscovered in 1814 by a visiting British soldier who spotted temple ruins lying in the middle of a lake. At that time the plain surrounding the Arjuna cluster was flooded with water which formed a small lake. In 1856, Isidore van Kinsbergen led an effort to drain the lake to reveal the temples. The Dutch East Indies Government continued the reconstruction project in 1864, followed by further study and photographs taken by Van Kinsbergen. The temples are now believed to have been named after the heroes of the Hindu epic Mahabharata.

== Temple compound ==
The temples are clustered around three groups; Arjuna, Dwarawati, and Gatotkaca clusters, while Bima temple was constructed as a separate single temple.

=== Arjuna cluster ===
The main temple compound clustered around the Arjuna temple in the plain surrounded by mountains and hills. Arjuna cluster located in the central area of the Dieng plateau, consists of four temples that lined elongated in north-south direction. Arjuna temple is located at the north end, then successively to the south are the Srikandi, Puntadewa, and Sembadra temple. Right in front of Arjuna temple stands Semar temple. The four temples in this cluster face west, except for Semar temple which faces east right the opposite of Arjuna temple. This temple compound is the most intact compared to the other temple groups clustered in the Dieng area.

- Arjuna Temple Compared to other temples, the Arjuna temple is quite intact with the complete reconstruction of the roof section. Photographs from the 19th century show that the top levels had fallen.
- Semar temple
- Srikandi temple
- Puntadewa temple
- Sembadra temple

=== Gatotkaca cluster ===
Gatotkaca group also consists of five temples; the Gatotkaca, Setyaki, Nakula, Sadewa, and Gareng temples. Today only the Gatotkaca temple remains stands, the other four temples have fallen into ruin.

- Gatotkaca temple

=== Dwarawati cluster ===
Dwarawati group consisted of four temples, namely Dwarawati, Abiyasa, Pandu, and Margasari temple. However, currently, only Dwarawati remain relatively intact, the rest are in ruins.

- Dwarawati temple

=== Bima temple ===
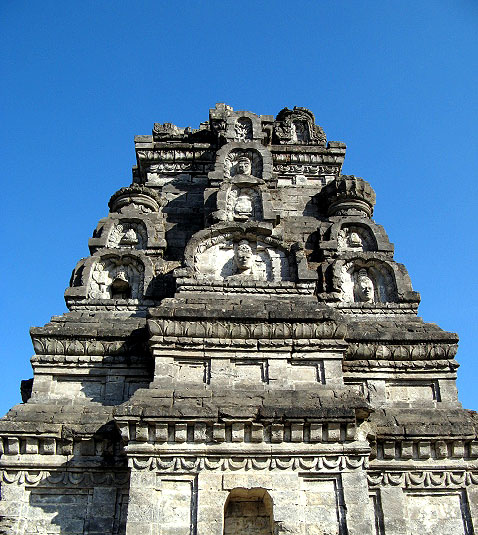
Candi Bima temple, Dieng temples, 8th century

Bima temple is a single temple situated on a hill separated from the rest of the Dieng temples. This temple is the largest and tallest building in the Dieng temple compound. The shape is different from temples in Central Java in general, and the other temples at this site, and relates more closely to Indian temples. In particular, it has been compared to the Parashurameshvara Temple (c. 650) in Bhubaneswar, Odisha, and the very different temple at Bhitargaon. The 7th-century Laxman Temple at Sirpur is closer.

The temple base has a square ground plan, and the facade on each side is slightly protruding out. The front facade protrudes about 1.5 m and serves as a porch before entering the temple's main chamber. Facades on the other three sides form niches where originally statues or images were stored, currently, all niches are empty.

The roof of the temple consists of 5 levels, with each level decreasing in size upward. Each level is decorated with lotus double seam and gavaksha or kudu niches. These are "window"-shaped arches common as a motif in Hindu temple architecture. Here each contains a head looking out. Such ornaments also can be found in other Javanese temples, such as Kalasan, Gebang, and Merak temple. The pinnacle of the roof is missing and its original form is unknown. There are amalaka-type segmented rings at the corners at one level, and the ornament with corbels, leaves, and festoons on the lower cornices, below the gavakshas, suggest influence from Chinese Buddhist art.

== Architecture ==
The temples are small shrines built as monuments to the god's ancestors and dedicated to Shiva. The Hindu shrines are miniature cosmic mountains based on plans in Indian religious texts, although Schoppert suggests that though the plans follow Indian texts, the ornament has "design motifs which for the most part have no clear correlate in India". In 2011, in a review published by Romain, the temples were related to Dravida and Pallava-style temples of South India.

The temples all have a single chamber inside, with one entrance, sometimes extended to make a small vestibule. The chambers are raised on plinths, and a cornice outside indicates their height inside. There is (or in some cases was) a high superstructure rising above the chamber, for which a variety of Indian forms are used in different temples.

Early North Central Javanese temple architecture is noted for its smaller size, simplicity, and relatively lack of ornaments compared to richly decorated and massive temples of Southern Central Java, such as Kalasan, Sewu, and Prambanan. The temples of North Central Java are grouped in irregular clusters, with individual variations of temple styles. This is in contrast to the concentric mandala plan of Southern Central Java temples with the uniform design of perwara (ancillary) temples.

The earliest architectural usage of the Javanese kala demonic masks and Makara marine monsters are exhibited along the niches and doorways of the remaining structures.

The Dieng structures were small and relatively plain, but stone architecture developed substantially in only a matter of decades resulting in masterpieces such as Prambanan and Borobudur.

== Gallery ==
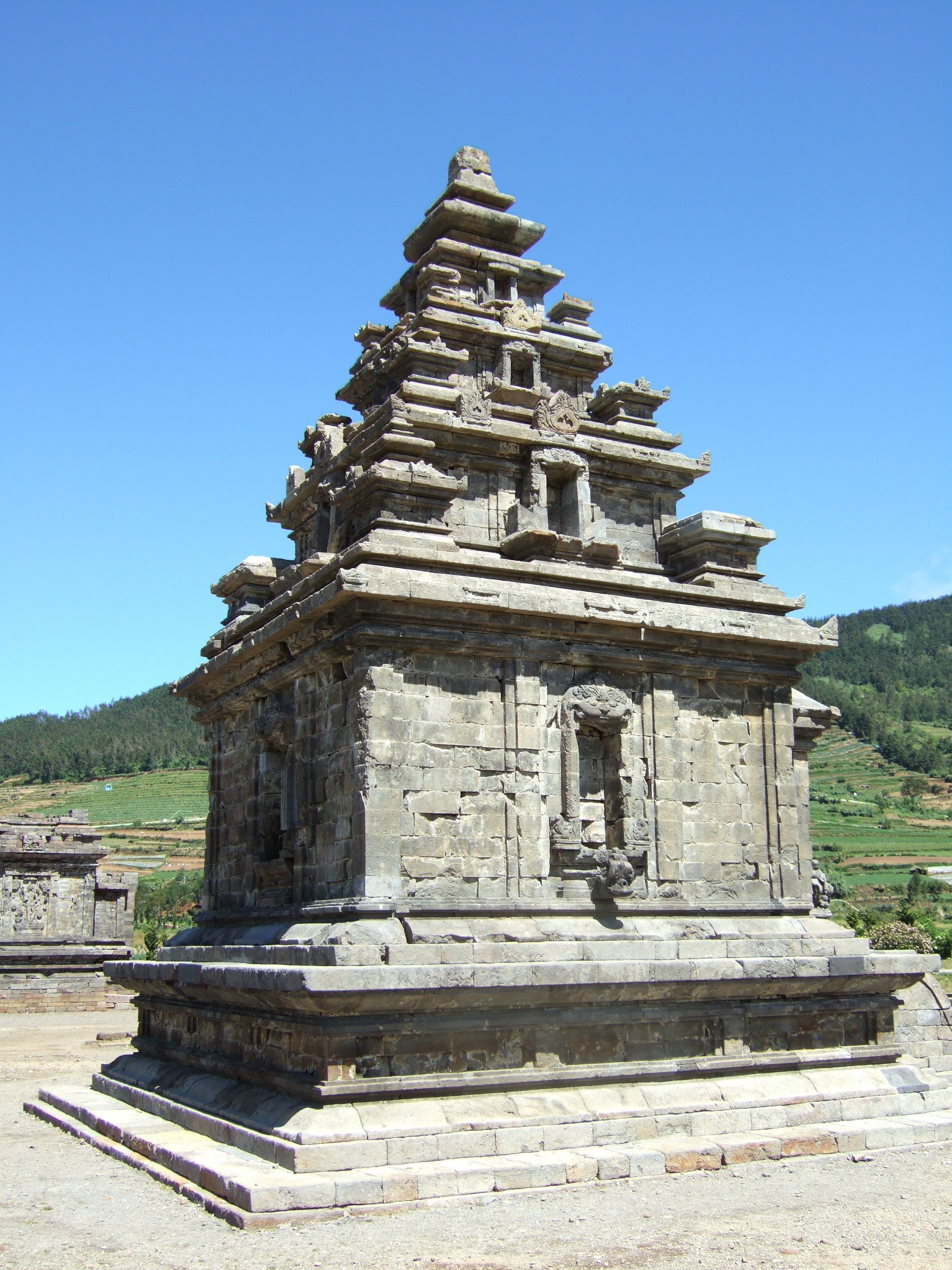
Arjuna temple

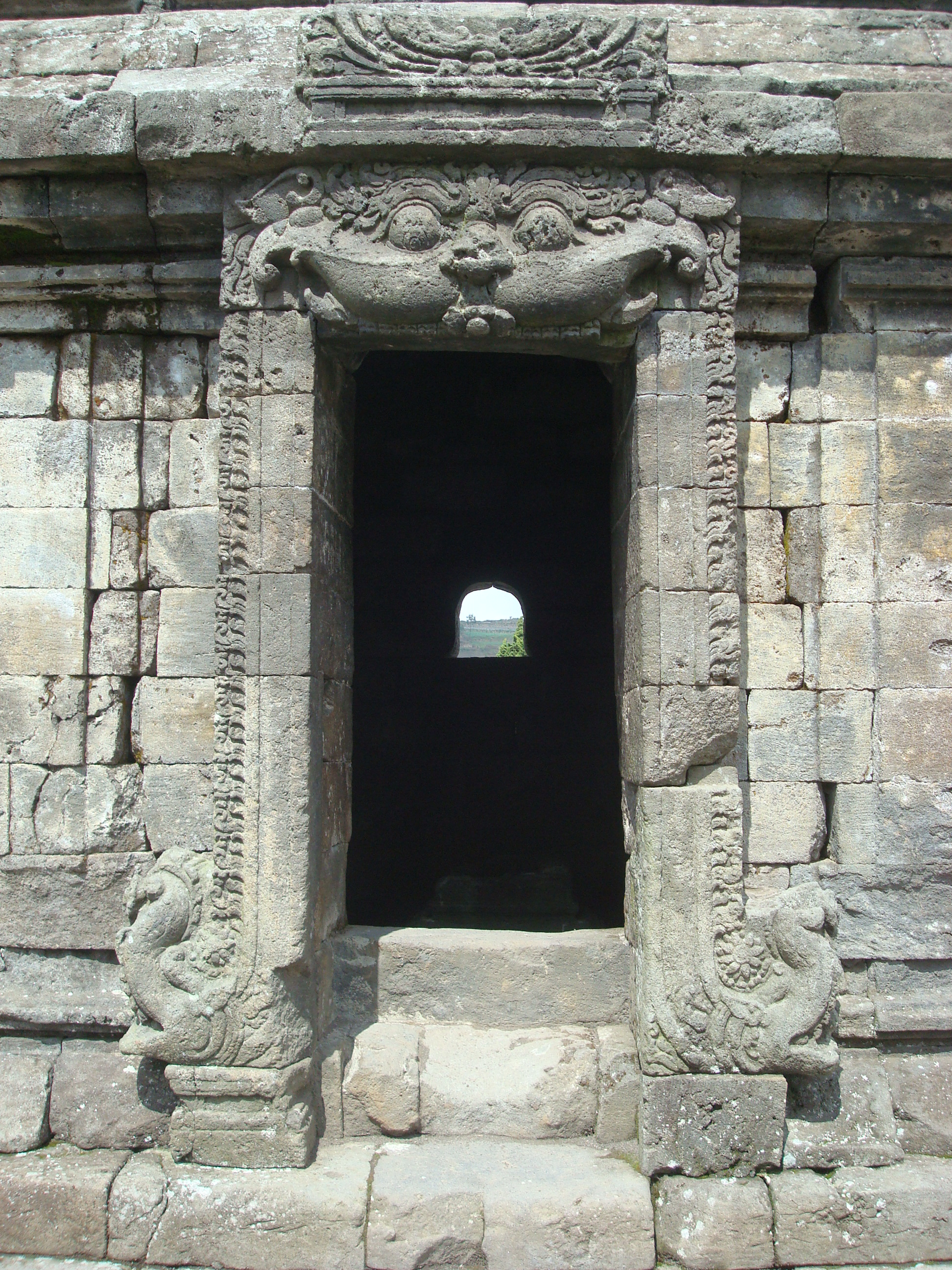
Doorway of the Arjuna temple

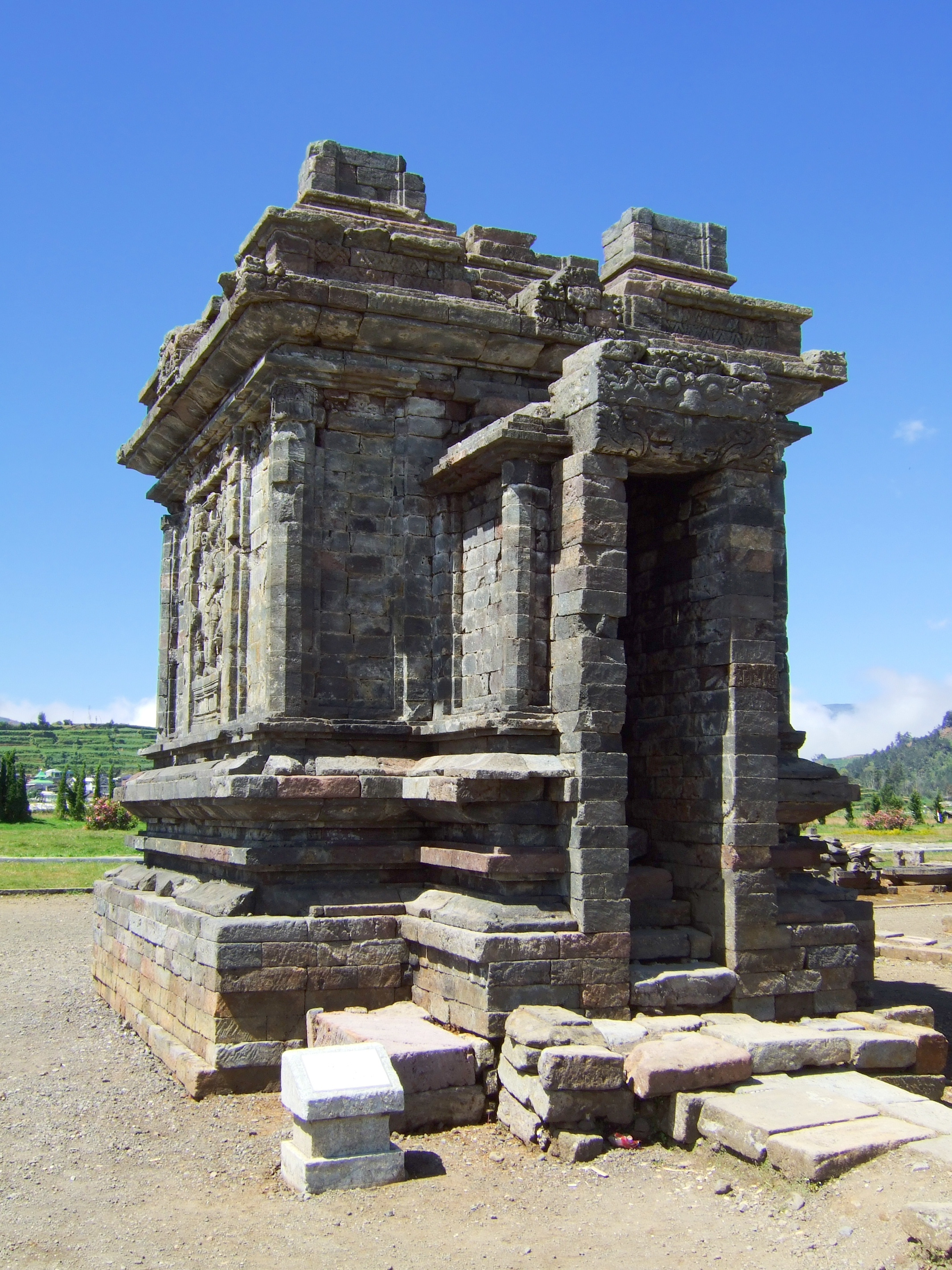
Srikandi temple

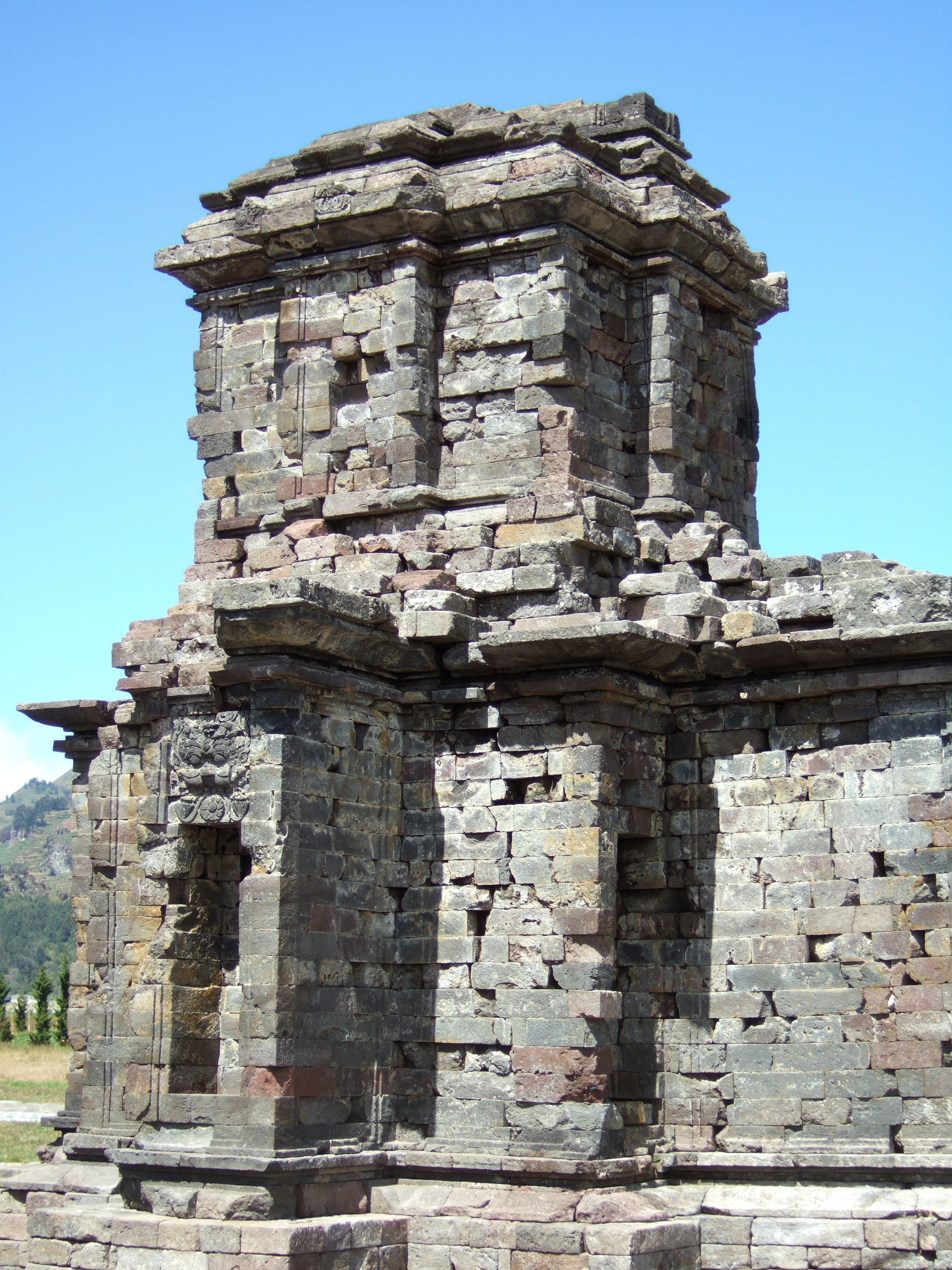
Sembadra temple

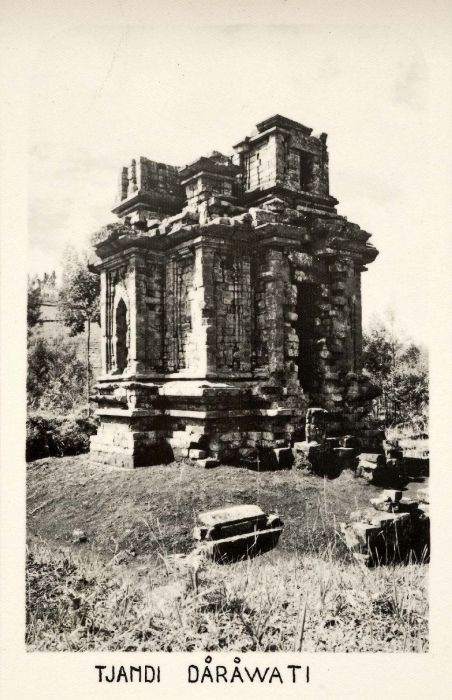
Dwarawati temple

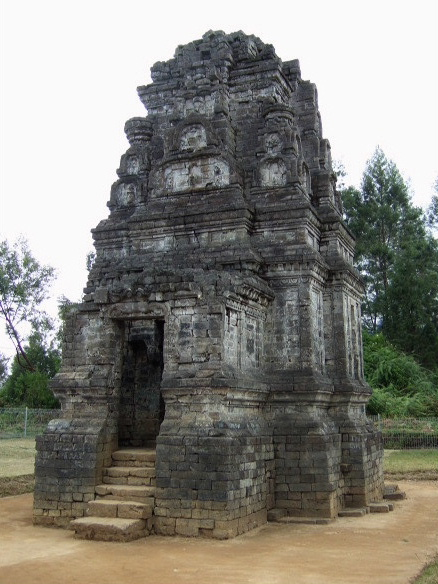
Bima temple

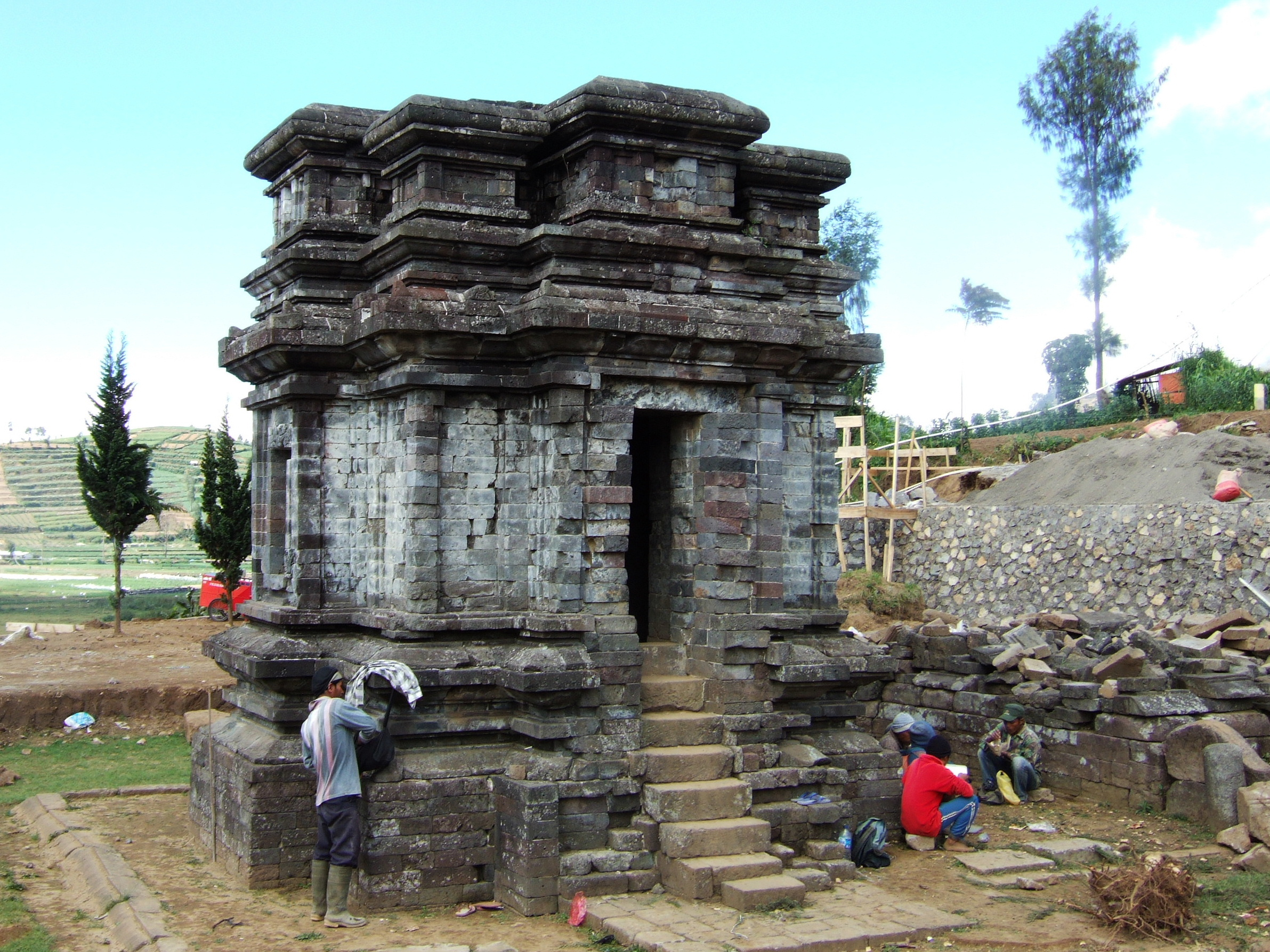
Gatotkaca temple

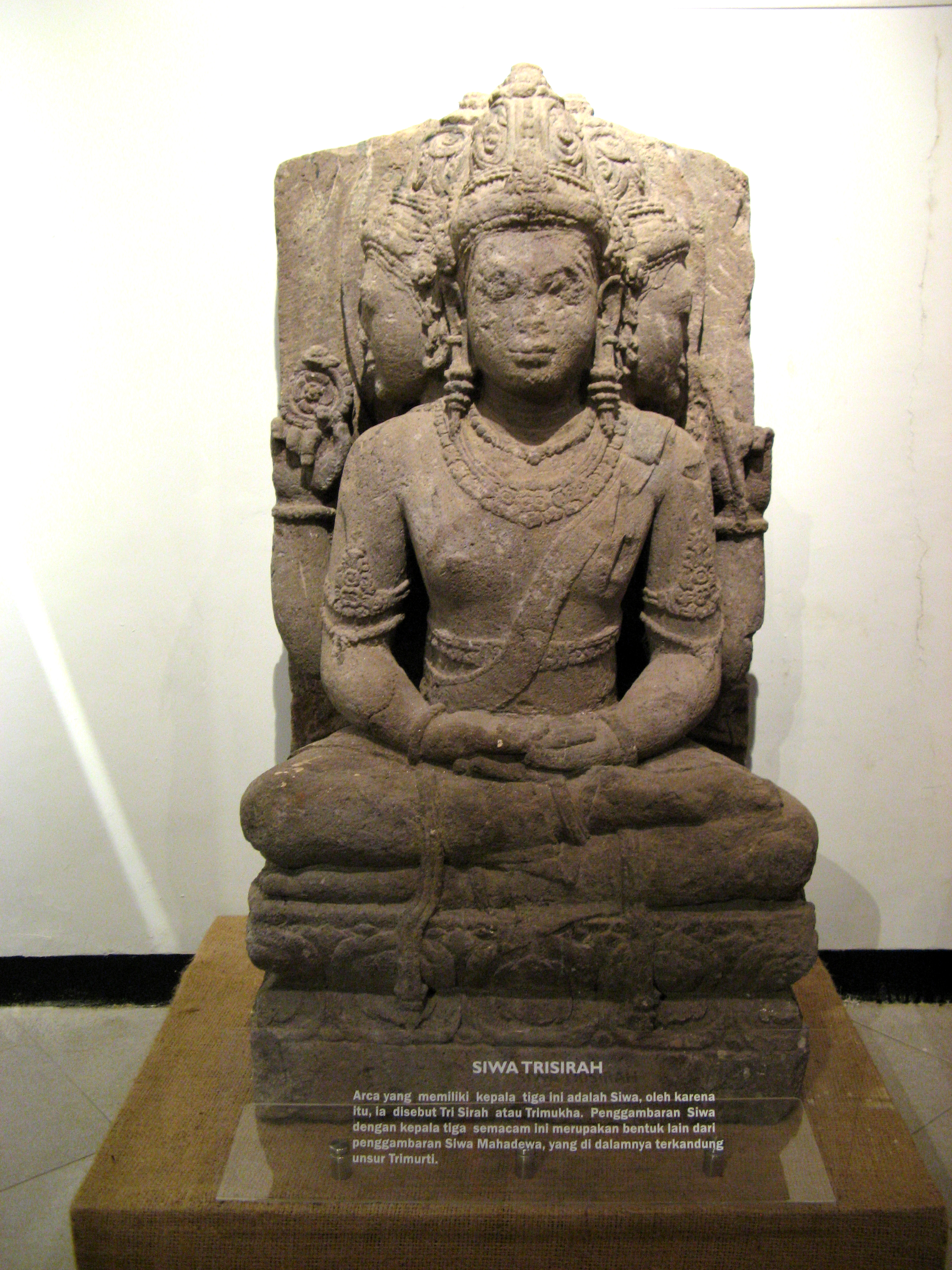
Sculpture of Shiva Trimukha, Kailasa Museum

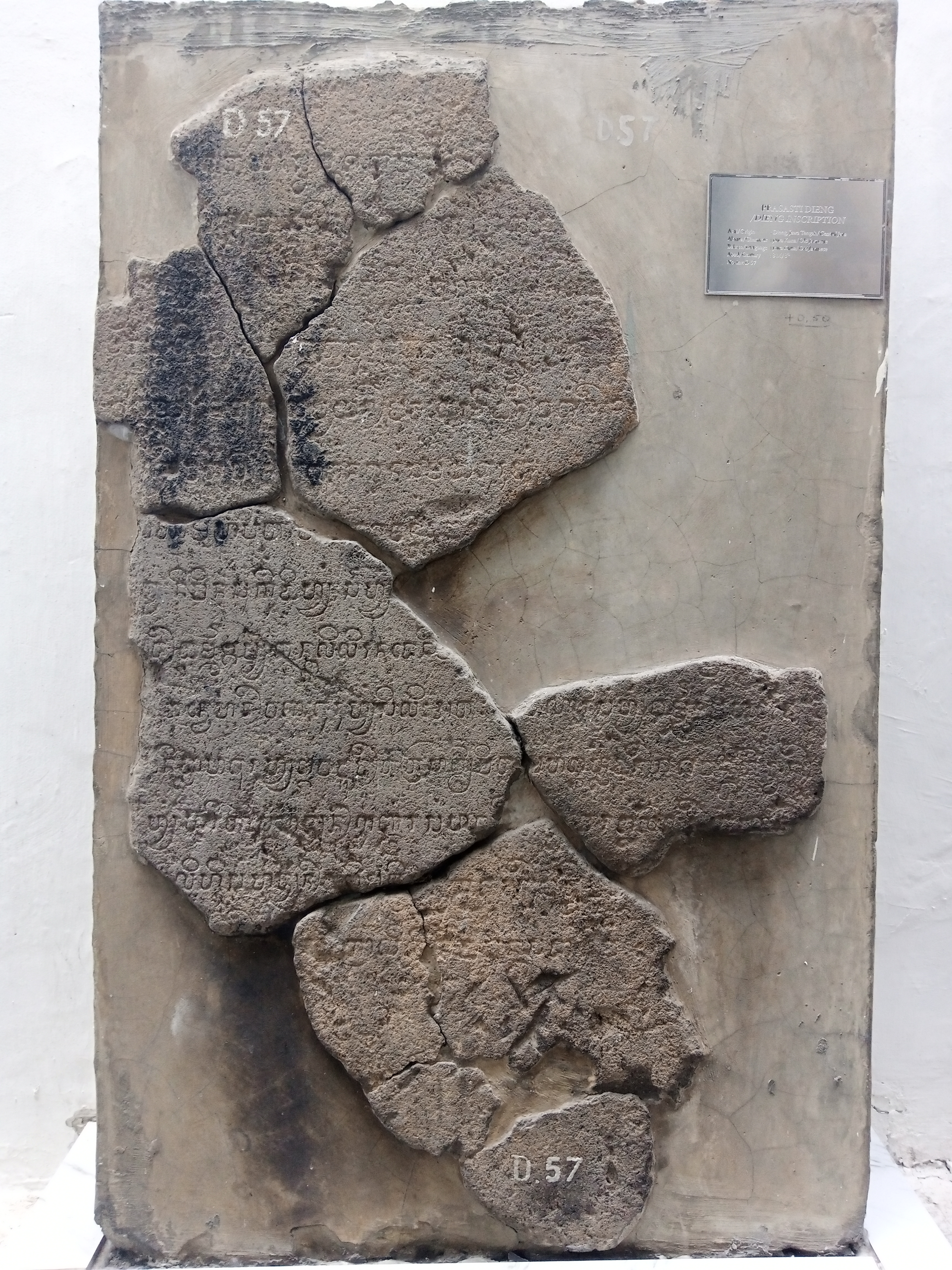
Dieng inscription (809 CE), National Museum of Indonesia

== Location ==
Dieng's misty location is almost 2,093 m above sea level, and its poisonous effusions and sulphur-coloured lakes make it a particularly auspicious place for religious tribute. The theory that poisonous effusions make it auspicious is now disputed as volcanic activity in this area from the 7th to 9th century is yet to be established, and records suggest the temple was abandoned after volcanic eruptions became common in central Java.

== See also ==
- Dieng Volcanic Complex
- Candi of Indonesia
- Indonesian architecture

== Bibliography ==
- Backshall, Stephan et al. (1999) Indonesia The Rough Guide London Penguin ISBN 1-85828-429-5 pp. 190–195
- Dalton, Bill Indonesia Handbook fourth edition pp. 280–283
- Dumarcay, J and Miksic J. Temples of the Dieng Plateau in Miksic, John N. 1996 (editor) 1996 Ancient History Volume 1 of Indonesian Heritage Series Archipleago Press, Singapore. ISBN 981-3018-26-7
- Michell, George, (1977) The Hindu Temple: An Introduction to its Meaning and Forms". pp. 160–161. University of Chicago Press. ISBN 978-0-226-53230-1
- Witton, Patrick (2003). Indonesia (7th ed.). Melbourne: Lonely Planet. pp. 209–211. ISBN 1-74059-154-2.
