= Indonesia Handbook =

Bill Dalton's Indonesia Handbook, published by Moon Publications in California, was the main English language tourist guide book for the whole of Indonesia between the 1970s and the 1990s.

== History ==
The book originated in 1973 as a typewritten publication, A Traveler's Notes: Indonesia, printed by Dalton when he was travelling in Australia. This led Dalton to form his company, Moon Publications, when he returned to California, and expand and publish his Travel Notes as a full book, the Indonesia Handbook.

The earlier editions in the late 1970s were much smaller than the later editions. During the Suharto era the guide book was at times banned. By the time of the last edition, published in 1995, the book was 1,380 pages long.

Moon expanded its range to publish a large number of travel handbooks, following the successful format of the Indonesia Handbook, to cover other areas, for example the South Pacific Handbook by David Stanley.

Dalton sold his interest in Moon Publications in 1999, and the new owners dropped the title.

== Other publications ==
The Department of Information of the Government of Indonesia published a volume with the same title between 1970 and 1977 - and it had been compiled and produced by Japenpa Foreign Languages Publishing Institute.

In 1996 the title Indonesia Handbook was used for a new guide book by Footprint Books, publisher of the South American Handbook.

== Publication details ==
- Dalton, Bill. 1982 Indonesia handbook 2nd ed., Chico, Calif.: Moon Publications.(rights in Hong Kong - location of printer) (486 p.) ISBN 978-0-9603322-0-5
- Dalton, Bill. 1985 Indonesia handbook 3rd ed., updated and rev. Chico, CA : Moon Publications. (588 p.) ISBN 0-918373-04-2
- Dalton, Bill. 1988 Indonesia handbook 4th ed. Chico, Calif., USA Moon Publications. (1058 p.) ISBN 0-918373-12-3
- Dalton, Bill. 1995 Indonesia handbook 6th ed. Chico, Calif., USA Moon Publications. (1380 p.) ISBN 978-1-56691-062-0
