= Max Fleischer (disambiguation) =

Max Fleischer (1883–1972) was a Polish-American cartoonist and animation pioneer, known for Betty Boop and Popeye the Sailor.

Max Fleischer may refer to:

- Max Fleischer (architect) (1841–1905), Austrian architect
- Max Fleischer (painter) (1861–1930), German painter and botanist
- Max Fleischer (author) (1880–1941), German-Austrian jurist and author

== See also ==
- Fleischer Studios
