= British Guild of Travel Writers =

The British Guild of Travel Writers Limited is described as a community of accredited writers, photographers, and broadcasters; the trusted body for independent editorial comment and expert content on worldwide travel. The organisation was founded in 1960.

The organisation is managed by a board of directors led currently (2026) by a Joint Chair, Daniel James Clarke and Renate Ruge.

== Members of the new limited company ==
The ten initial subscribers to the Memorandum of Association are automatically members of the new private company. Other members will be admitted in due course, provided that they meet the criteria for membership laid down in the Articles of Association. The antecedent voluntary association made provision for retired members (and others who were no longer professionally active) to retain a connection with BGTW as Associate Members. This category continues, but Associate Members will not be deemed to be members of British Guild of Travel Writers Limited under the terms of the Companies Act 2006.

== Scope of members' work ==
Texts, broadcasts and images created by members of the old voluntary association appear virtually daily in the UK media and on the Internet, and to a lesser extent in non-UK print and broadcast media, with BGTW members reporting on travel and tourism issues from across the world. Many Guild members are established writers of guide books and narrative travel books, others frequently lecture on their specialist areas, while yet others comment critically on the history of travel or travel writing or on contemporary issues in transport and tourism.

BGTW members write about destinations; they write about journeys, and they write about travel issues. The latter routinely include public transport, civil aviation, overland travel, ecotourism, slow travel, travel technology, consumer protection in the travel industry, medical tourism and travel medicine, and the development of and prospects for travel literature.

With the opportunities in travel writing shifting further away from print journalism, a diminishing number of BGTW members would describe themselves as journalists per se. But there are nonetheless still many members contributing to mainstream media. Narrative travel books written by current BGTW members have won the Dolman Best Travel Book Award and the Wales Book of the Year. The BGTW considers applications from those who "weave words with style, take wonderful pics or cut a dash in other travel media genres."

== AGM and Yearbook ==
Until its dissolution in 2015, the association held an annual conference, restricted to members. The association's most recent annual meetings were held in the Scottish Highlands (2007), Malta (2008), York (2009), Tenerife (2010), Mussanah in Oman (2011), Boulogne on the north coast of France (2012), Zakopane in Poland (2013), Weimar in Germany (2014) and Milan (2015).

From 2016, the Company's AGMs are conducted under the rules laid down by the Companies Act 2006, and so are strictly restricted to company business; those members not in attendance will be able to take advantage of new arrangements for proxy voting. The first AGM held under the new regulations was held in Tenerife in January 2016. It was funded by Hume Whitehead, a London-based public relations company. The Company also held AGMs in Charleston, SC in 2019, then in the Canary Islands in 2022, Malta in 2023, and the Isle of Man in 2024. In 2025 and 2026, the Annual General Meeting itself was held in London independently from the members' trip, which was to Sri Lanka (2025) and Paphos, Cyprus (2026).

The association's Yearbook was usually published in March each year; it enjoyed circulated widely within the UK travel trade and was also available for purchase by the public. The last yearbook was published in May 2015, carrying the date 2015-2016. The members' director has since moved online and can be viewed on the BGTW's new website.

In 2026, to celebrate the association's 65th Anniversary, the BGTW published Around the World in 65 Years (Journey Books by Bradt), an inspiring travel anthology of 101 travel stories, experiences and photography written by acclaimed members. Spanning both time and place, the anthology revives articles from the last six decades of the travel industry, right up to today,

== BGTW awards programmes ==
Through its annual Tourism Awards, the voluntary association recognised innovation and excellence in the tourism industry, both in the British Isles and more widely. The awards were reserved for projects that make a creative contribution to the experience and understanding of travellers. The project must be environmentally and socially responsible. The new company has not announced if this awards programme will continue.

The award presentations were made each November at an annual awards dinner in London hosted on the eve of the World Travel Market (WTM). The BGTW voluntary association was often successful in securing sponsorship of its annual awards dinner including support from Las Vegas Convention and Visitors Authority and tourist authorities in Malta, Jersey, Turkey and Belgium. The successor company has not yet announced sponsorship arrangements for the 2015 dinner and subsequent events.

At the annual awards dinner, the Guild had also made awards to its own members, recognising excellence in various categories of travel writing, as well as for travel photography, radio and television programmes related to travel, etc. The principal award is for the Travel Writer of the Year, based upon a portfolio of about half a dozen published articles and evaluated by an independent panel of assessors.

The Guild also, from time to time, made a Lifetime Achievement Award to an individual who had made, over a sustained period, a notable and positive contribution to the development of worthwhile travel, either through published work or other initiatives. Recipients of the BGTW Lifetime Achievement Award include Hilary Bradt, the founder of the pioneering travel guidebook company Bradt Travel Guides, and the distinguished British travel writers Eric Newby and Patrick Leigh Fermor. The last such award was made in 2011.

For many years, the British Guild of Travel Writers ran an annual travel writing competition to encourage new writing talent. The programme was discontinued in early 2014.
