= Hilary Bradt =

British publisher and writer

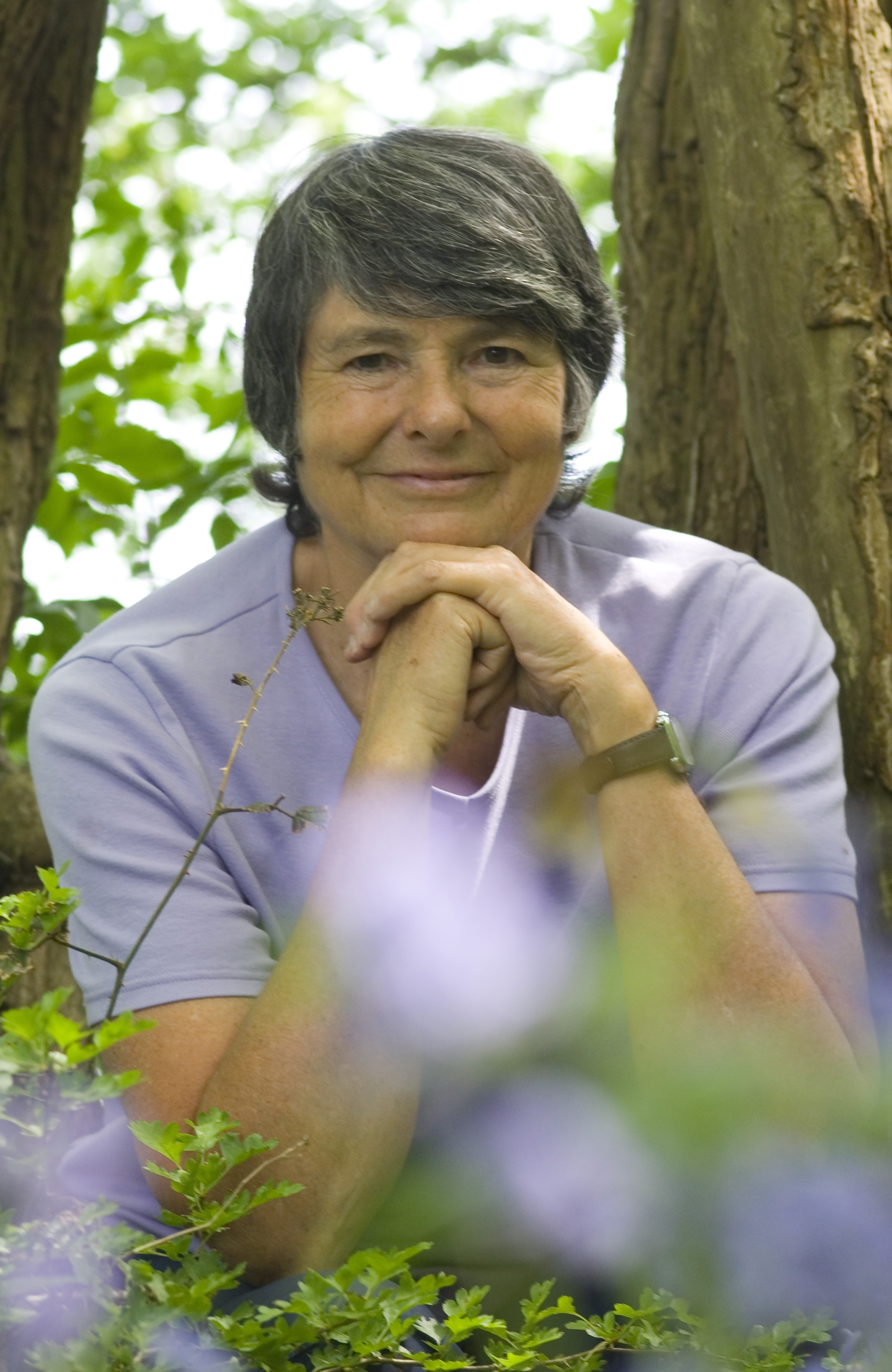
- Hilary Bradt in 2006
- Born: 17 July 1941 (age 85)
- Occupations: Author and publisher
- Writing career
- Language: English
- Period: 1974 to present day
- Genre: Travel guide books
- Subjects: Madagascar, Peru, Devon
- Notable awards: MBE for services to the tourist industry and to charity, 2008; British Guild of Travel Writers' Lifetime Achievement Award, 2009
- Website: www.hilarybradt.com

Hilary Bradt MBE (born 17 July 1941) is the founder of Bradt Travel Guides, a publisher which became an increasingly visible presence in the travel guide book world starting in the mid-1970s.

From 1972, Bradt spent 18 months backpacking from Colombia to Tierra del Fuego and then Argentina and Brazil with her then husband George, with whom she subsequently co-founded Bradt Travel Guides. Their first book was Backpacking along Ancient Ways in Peru and Bolivia.

The Bradt guides began by covering exotic or off-beat destinations, such as Rwanda and Albania, and have continued to target this niche, frequently publishing guides to countries not yet covered by any other travel publisher. The Bradt books have won a number of awards. The company is based in Chalfont St Peter, England.

After running the company for 35 years, Bradt announced her retirement in 2007, but retains an involvement as a director of the company. She also continues to write after her retirement, authoring a guide book to Devon and contributing articles to national newspapers and magazines, as well as in a collection of travellers tales.

Bradt has also worked extensively as a tour leader. Her area of special expertise is Madagascar and she has written several books on this African island nation. Bradt is a long-standing member of the British Guild of Travel Writers, from which she received a Lifetime Achievement Award in November 2009.

She was appointed Member of the Order of the British Empire (MBE) in the 2008 Birthday Honours for services to the tourist industry and to charity. Amongst other charity work, Bradt is patron of the British charity Money for Madagascar, which has been raising funds for projects in the country since 1986.
