= William Henry Koebel =

William Henry Koebel (1872–1923) was an English author and businessman. He is best remembered today for his books on trade and travel within Portugal (and Madeira), the Caribbean, Central America and South America. His books continue to be studied today by academics.

== Life ==
Koebel was born in Forest Hill, London, England. Having focused on Portugal in his earlier years as a writer, painting a detailed and colourful portrait of the country in its final months under a monarchy, he travelled the Caribbean, Central and South America. He worked to expand British trade in the regions, most successfully in Chile and especially the port of Valparaíso which was a major British trading port before the construction of the Panama Canal. His most successful and influential book is the South American Handbook, which was first published in 1921 and continues to be edited and reprinted as recently as 2014.

== Works ==
- Portugal, Its Land and People (1909)
- Madeira: old and new (1909)
- In the Maoriland bush [1911]
- South American Handbook (1921) ISBN 9781907263774
- British Exploits in South America: A History of British Activities in Exploration, Military Adventure, Diplomacy, Science, and Trade, in Latin America (1917)
- Paraguay (1917)
- Argentina, Past & Present (1922)
- Uruguay... (1923)
- South America (1913)
- Modern Argentina, the El Dorado of To-Day, with Notes on Uruguay and Chile (1923)
- South America: An Industrial and Commercial Field (1923)
- In Jesuit Land, the Jesuit Missions of Paraguay (1923)
- Modern Chile; With Illustrations and Map (1923)
- The Great South Land; the River Plate and Southern Brazil of To-day (1923)
