= Max Fleischer (painter) =

German artist and botanist (1861–1930)

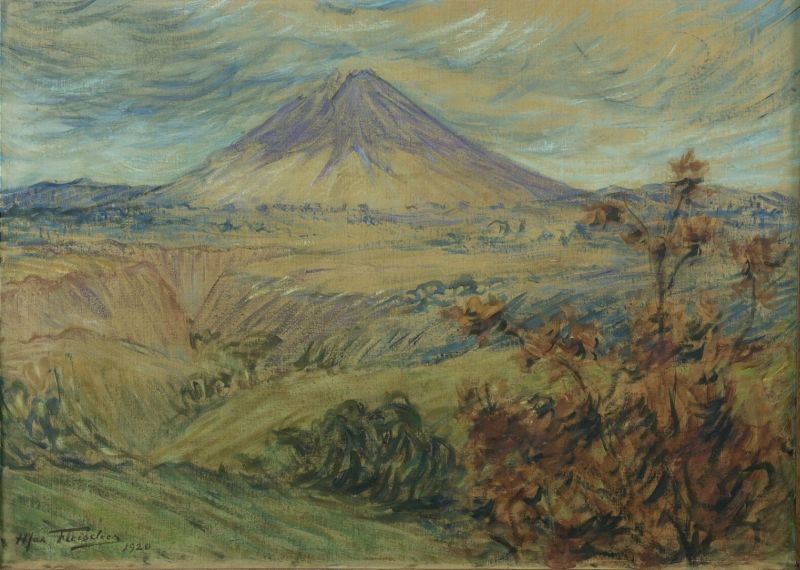
Volcano on Java

Richard Paul Max Fleischer (4 July 1861, Lipine in Oberschlesien, Kingdom of Prussia – 3 April 1930, Menton, France) was a German painter and bryologist. As a botanist, he is remembered for his work with Javan mosses.

== Biography ==
He took art classes in Breslau, qualifying as an art teacher in 1881. He furthered his studies in Munich and Paris, where his interest in natural sciences grew. He subsequently moved to Zurich in 1892 in order to study geology. In the latter part of the 1890s, he was invited by botanist Melchior Treub to Java as an illustrator. On Java, along with his artistic duties, he collected regional botanical specimens and conducted investigations of the island's mosses. Fleischer distributed several exsiccatae, among them Musci frondosi Archipelagi Indici exsiccati and – together with Carl Friedrich Warnstorf – Bryotheca Europaea Meridionalis. During his time spent in the Dutch East Indies, he also learned the technique of creating batik prints from vegetable dyes.

After several years on Java, he traveled to New Guinea, the Bismarck Archipelago, Australia, New Zealand and South America, prior to returning to Germany in 1903. From 1908 to 1913, he revisited Maritime Southeast Asia, where he collected mostly bryophytes but also orchids and fungi on Java.

In 1914 he began work at the botanical museum in Berlin and three years later, he was appointed a professor of botany at the University of Berlin. In 1925 he traveled to the Canary Islands in order to paint and to study the regions' mosses. During the following year, he relocated to The Hague, and in 1927 he returned to the Canaries with his second wife, P.G. Haigton. After his death in 1930, his private collections and library were purchased by an antiquarian in Leipzig.

== Gallery ==
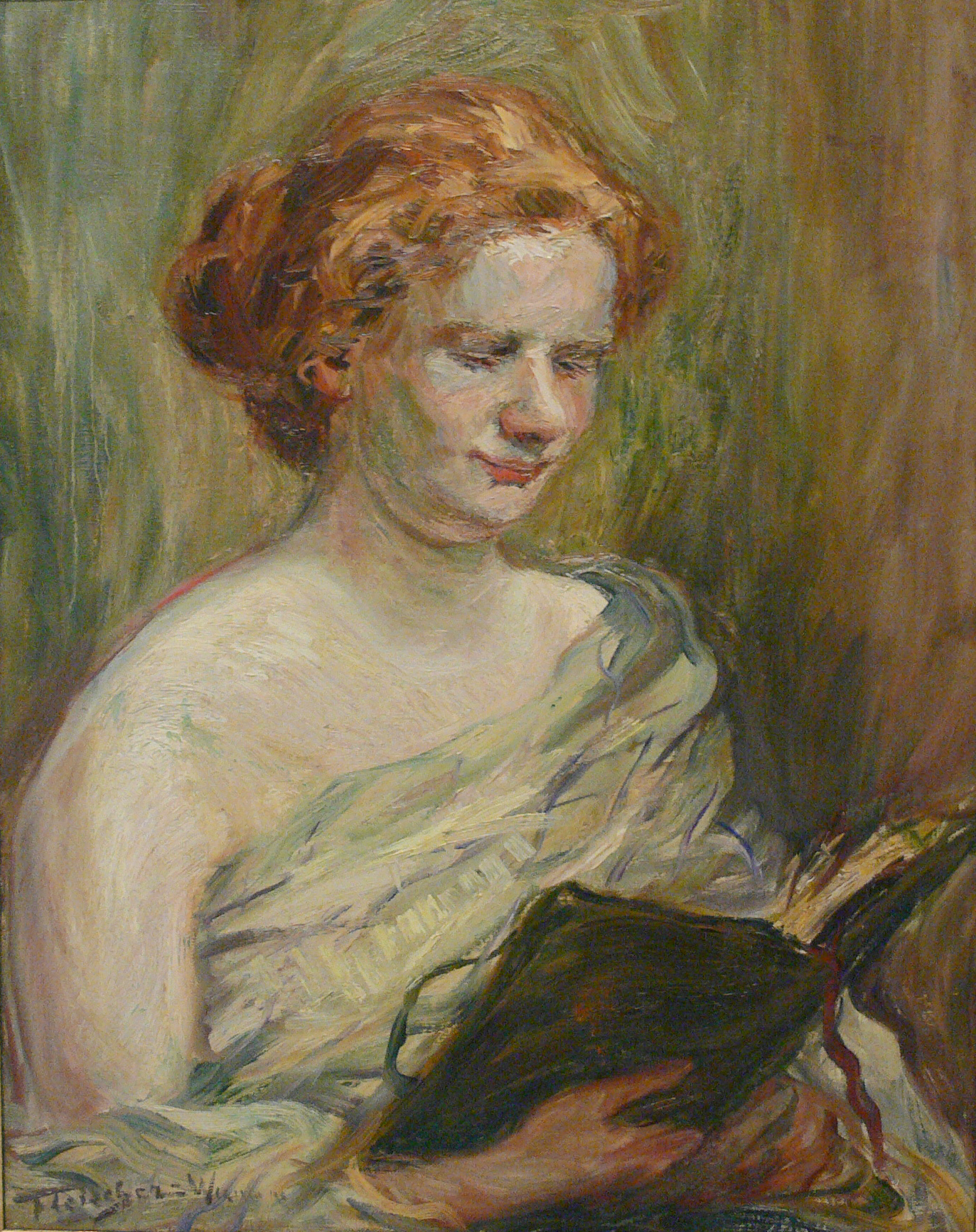
Painting of a female student

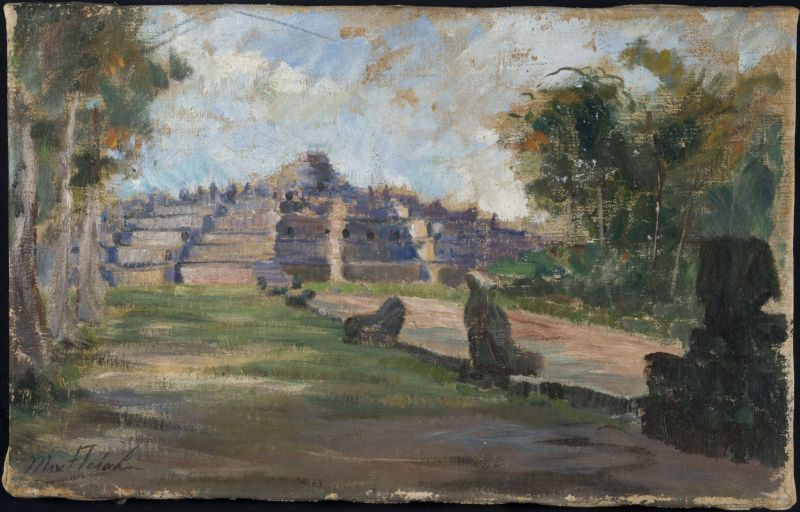
Painting of Borobudur

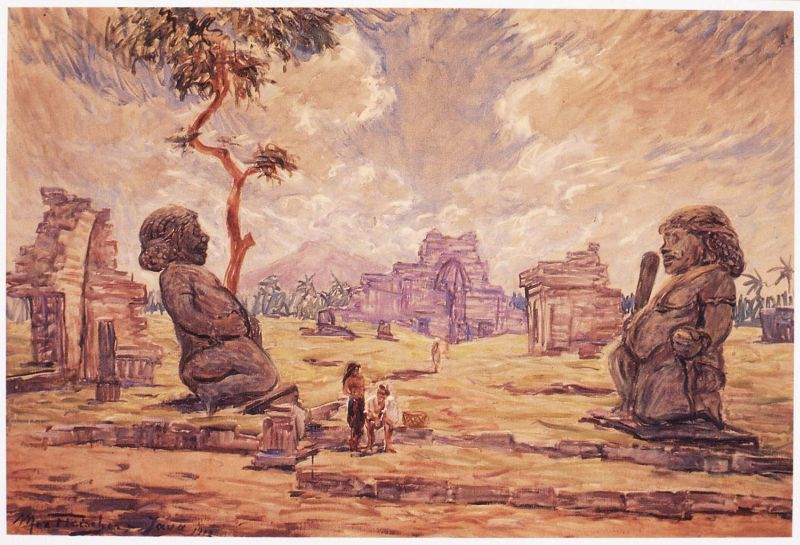
Ruins of Candi Sewu

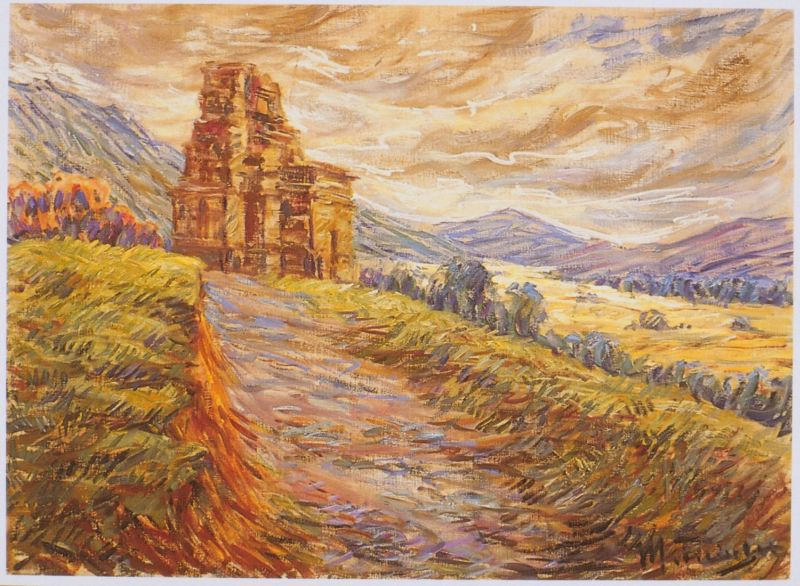
Painting of Candi Bima in Dieng Plateau

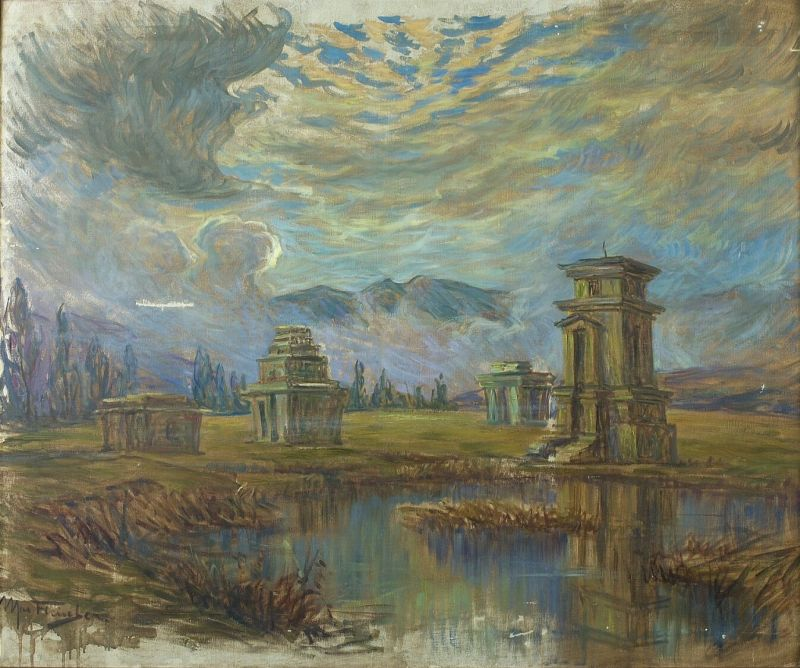
Candi Arjuna in Dieng Plateau

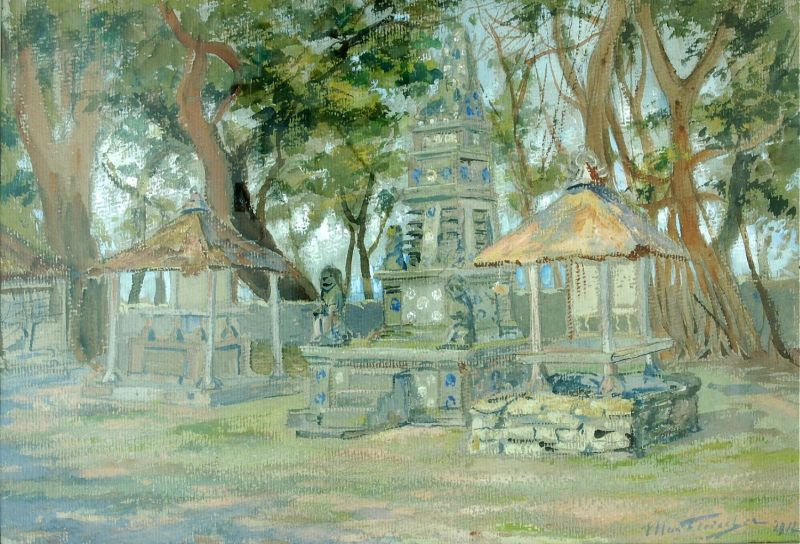
Painting of Balinese Temple

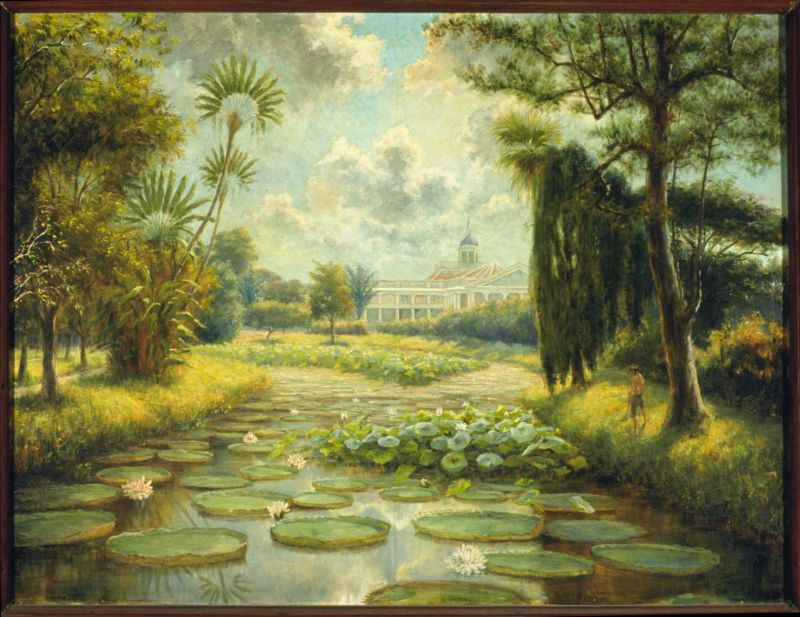
Painting of Bogor Botanical Garden, where Max Fleischer work with Dr. Melchior Treub.

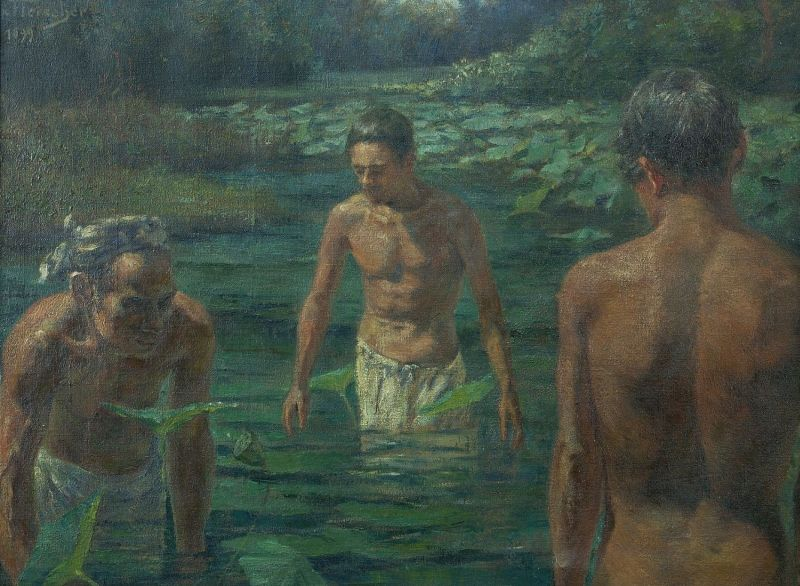
Painting of 3 Javanese men in a pond

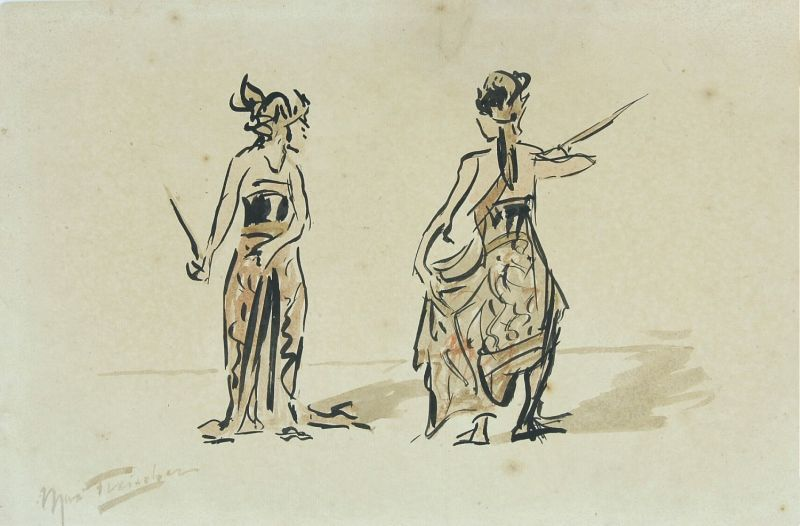
Painting of Javanese dancers

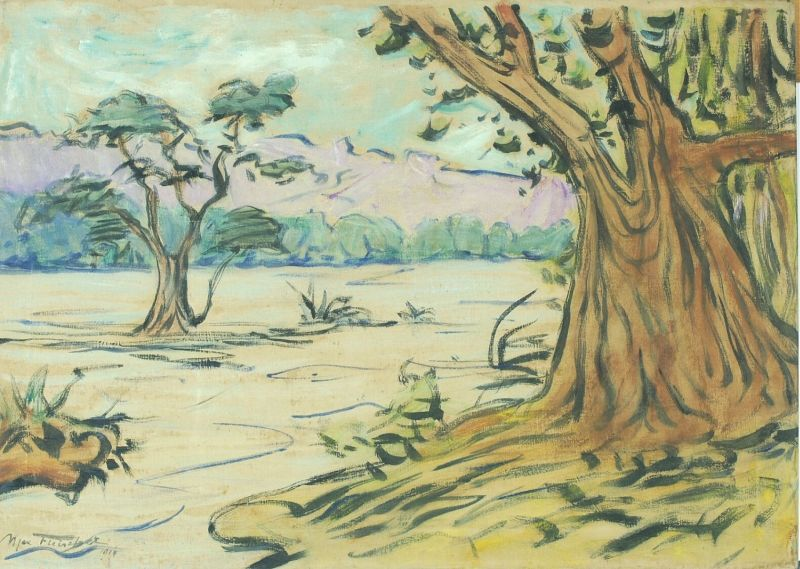
A Javanese river landscape

== Publications ==
- "Die Musci der Flora von Buitenzorg : zugleich Laubmoosflora von Java / bearbeitet von Max Fleischer; Enthaltend alle aus Java bekannt gewordenden Sphagnales und Bryales, nebst kritischen Bemerkungen vieler Archipelarten, sowie, indischer und australischer Arten"; Series: Flore de Buitenzorg; pt. 5. Leiden : E.J. Brill, (1900–1922). In the fourth volume of this work, he delineated a new natural system of classifying mosses that was subsequently adopted by Viktor Ferdinand Brotherus in his second edition of Musci in Adolf Engler's Die Natürlichen Pflanzenfamilien.

== See also ==
- List of German painters
