= South American Handbook =

English-language travel guide

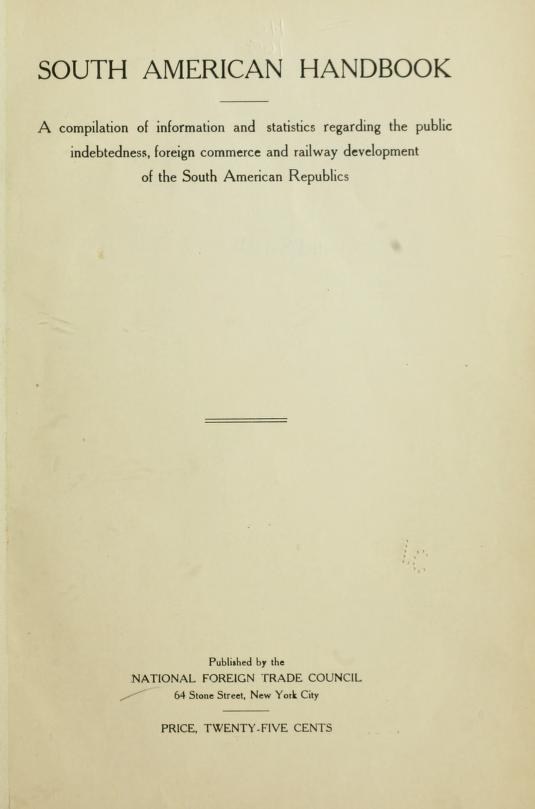
- Publisher: National Foreign Trade Council
- Publication date: 1915

The South American Handbook is a travel guide to South America, published in the United Kingdom by Bradt Guides. It is the longest-running travel guide in the English language. In 2010 it was chosen as the Best South American Handbook by Sounds and Colours.

== History ==
The handbook was first published in 1921 as the Anglo-South American Handbook. It was founded and compiled by William Henry Koebel (1872–1923), a prolific author who had a particular interest in promoting trade with South America. It was compiled as a guide to South America, as well as Mexico and Cuba, for the business traveller, and published by the Federation of British Industry.

Two editions later the book was 'privatised' and in 1924 it became the South American Handbook, published by Trade and Travel Publications Ltd, a Royal Mail Steam Packet Company subsidiary incorporated in December 1922. At the time, travel was by sea and the handbook gave all the details needed for the long voyage from Europe, including a full account of the journey from Liverpool up the Amazon to Manaus, some 5,898 miles without changing cabin. It also imparted such invaluable etiquette advice as to 'pack a good saddle and a set of starched collars'.

From about the 1930s the Mendip Press of Bath, Somerset printed the book. Early in the 1970s Royal Mail Lines sold Trade and Travel Publications to the Mendip Press's parent company, Dawson and Goodall Ltd. The handbook continued to be published annually and received updates from readers, including figures such as Paul Theroux and the novelist Graham Greene, who addressed his updates to 'The publishers of the best travel guide in the world, Bath, England'.

Over the years the handbook expanded its coverage to include all the countries of South America, Central America, Mexico and the Caribbean. It continued to include data for businessmen, but by the 1970s was increasingly aimed at leisure travellers, particularly backpackers following the Gringo Trail. In 1989 the 65th edition was almost 1,400 pages long.

In 1990 the handbook was split. The Mexico & Central America Handbook and the Caribbean Islands Handbook were published as separate volumes, and from then on the South American Handbook covered only South America.

Trade and Travel Publications changed its name to Footprint Handbooks Ltd in August 1996.

== The Handbook today ==
The book's publisher, Footprint, was acquired by Bradt Guides in 2019, after which there were a few years without new editions due to the impact of the COVID-19 pandemic on the global travel industry. A special Centenary Edition of the South American Handbook was published on the book's 101st anniversary in 2025, and contains 1,824 pages. New editor Daniel Austin took over the role from Ben Box, who had written for the handbook since 1980 and been its editor since 1989.
