= Bradt Travel Guides =

Publisher of travel guides

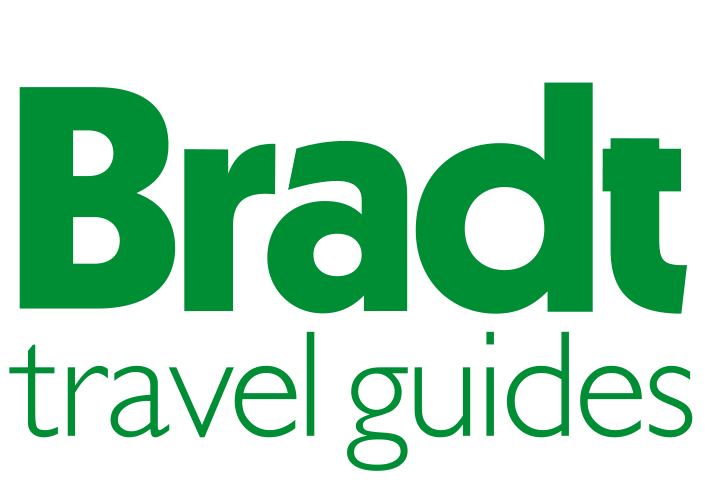
- Founded: 1974
- Founder: Hilary Bradt
- Country of origin: United Kingdom
- Headquarters location: Chalfont St. Peter, Buckinghamshire
- Distribution: Grantham Book Service
- Publication types: Books
- Nonfiction topics: Travel guides
- Official website: www.bradtguides.com

Bradt Travel Guides is a publisher of travel guides founded in 1974 by Hilary Bradt and her husband George, who co-wrote the first Bradt Guide on a river barge on a tributary of the Amazon.

Since then Bradt has grown into a independent travel publisher, with growth particularly in the last decade. It has a reputation for tackling destinations overlooked by other guide book publishers. Bradt guides have been cited by The Independent as covering "parts of the world other travel publishers don't reach", and nearly two-thirds of the guides on the publisher's list have no direct competition in English from other travel publishers.

These include guides to parts of Asia, Latin America and Africa, in particular, which traditionally have not been widely covered by guidebook publishers, or do not have a long history of tourism. Bradt also has an extensive list of regional European guides to destinations such as the Peloponnese, the Vendée and the Basque Country.

The guides give a brief summary of the history of the destination. Each guide then covers the basics such as geography and climate, wildlife, languages and culture, healthcare and media. Subsequent chapters are usually arranged on a geographical basis, addressing the main cities or regions of the destination in systematic order. According to Michael Palin: "Bradt Guides are expertly written and longer on local detail than any others".

Bradt guides are often written by writers who live in the country or region they are writing about or have travelled there extensively over many years, rather than professional travel writers. As such, they may be written somewhat unconventionally compared with normal tourist guides. Bradt guides often relay information about the nature of the local people, based on the experiences of the author. The health chapters are written in collaboration with a well-travelled doctor: Jane Wilson-Howarth or Felicity Nicholson.

In 2010 Bradt launched the Slow Travel series of UK regional guides, now 16 titles strong. And the publisher also has a list of travel narratives and nature writing from authors such as Jonathan Scott, Brian Jackman and Princess Michael of Kent.

Bradt Travel Guides is based in Chalfont St Peter in Buckinghamshire, England and co-publishes with Globe Pequot in Guilford, Connecticut in the United States.

Bradt has won or been shortlisted for many awards, including: Sunday Times Small Publisher of the Year in 1997; Gold Award in the Wanderlust Best Guidebook Awards in 2009, 2011, 2015, 2016, 2018 and 2019; Which? magazine's Top Recommended Travel Guide Publisher in 2011 and 2012; and a shortlisting for Independent Publisher of the Year at the British Book Awards, 2017. In 2008 Hilary Bradt was appointed an MBE for services to the Tourist Industry and to Charity.

In 2019, Bradt acquired competitor Footprint Travel Guides.

== Countries/areas covered by the guides ==
=== Africa ===
- Africa (overland)
- Angola
- Botswana
- Burkina Faso
- Cameroon
- Cape Verde
- Congo
- Equatorial Guinea
- Eritrea
- Ethiopia
- Gabon
- The Gambia
- Ghana
- Ivory Coast
- Kenya
- Madagascar
- Malawi
- Mauritius (incl. Rodrigues and Réunion)
- Mozambique
- Namibia
- Nigeria
- Rwanda
- São Tomé and Príncipe
- Senegal
- Seychelles
- Sierra Leone
- Somaliland
- South Africa
- South Sudan
- Sudan
- Swaziland
- Tanzania (and Northern) and Zanzibar
- Uganda
- Zambia
- Zimbabwe
- Saint Helena, Ascension Island and Tristan da Cunha

=== Americas and Caribbean ===
- Amazon
- Argentina
- Canada (Nova Scotia)
- Chile
- Colombia
- Dominica
- Ecuador
- Falkland Islands
- Grenada
- Guyana
- Haiti
- Panama
- Paraguay
- Peru (Trekking)
- Suriname
- United States (Rail guide)
- Uruguay
- Venezuela

=== Wildlife ===
- Antarctica
- Arctic
- Australia
- British Isles
- Central and Eastern Europe
- China
- Galápagos Islands
- Madagascar
- Pantanal
- Peru
- Southern Africa
- Sri Lanka

=== Europe ===
- Albania
- Armenia (and Nagorno-Karabakh)
- Azores
- Belgium (Flanders, Mons and Waterloo)
- Bosnia and Herzegovina
- Bulgaria
- Croatia (and Istria)
- Cyprus (Northern)
- Estonia
- Faroe Islands
- France (Lille, the Basque Country and the Vendée)
- Georgia
- Finland (Lapland)
- Greece (Peloponnese)
- Hungary
- Iceland
- Italy (Abruzzo, Emilia-Romagna and Liguria)
- Kosovo
- Luxembourg
- Malta (and Gozo)
- Montenegro
- North Macedonia
- Portugal (Alentejo)
- Romania (Transylvania)
- Scotland (Outer Hebrides)
- Serbia
- Slovenia
- Slovakia (Bratislava)
- Svalbard (Spitsbergen)
- Sweden (West)
- Switzerland (Rail, road and lake)
- Ukraine
- The Northern Lights
- World War One Battlefields

==== Slow Guides to the United Kingdom ====
- Cornwall
- Cheshire
- Cotswolds
- Devon (North Devon, South Devon, East Devon & the Jurassic Coast)
- Dumfries and Galloway
- New Forest
- Norfolk
- Northumberland
- North York Moors and Yorkshire Wolds
- Peak District
- Shropshire
- Suffolk
- Sussex
- Yorkshire Dales

=== Asia, Central Asia and the Middle East ===
- Bangladesh
- Borneo
- Iran
- Iraq
- Israel
- Jordan
- Kashmir
- Kazakhstan
- Kyrgyzstan
- Maldives
- Mongolia
- North Korea
- Oman
- Palestine
- Sri Lanka
- Taiwan
- Tajikistan
- Tibet
- Turkmenistan
- Uzbekistan
- Yemen
