= Fontinalis duriaei =

Scientific classification
- Kingdom: Plantae
- Division: Bryophyta
- Class: Bryopsida
- Subclass: Bryidae
- Order: Hypnales
- Family: Fontinalaceae
- Genus: Fontinalis
- Species: F. duriaei

Binomial name
- Fontinalis duriaei Schimp.

Synonyms
- Fontinalis hypnoides duriaei

Species of moss

Fontinalis dueriaei is a species of moss belonging to the family Fontinalaceae. It is notable for large, flat, concave leaves, reddish stems, and for being the fastest grower of the Fontinalis genus. It regrows in fall and winter.

It is closely related to Fontinalis hypnoides, often being referred to as a variation of the species.

It is native to Eurasia and Northern America.
