= Cryphaea lamyana =

Scientific classification
- Kingdom: Plantae
- Division: Bryophyta
- Class: Bryopsida
- Subclass: Bryidae
- Order: Hypnales
- Family: Cryphaeaceae
- Genus: Cryphaea
- Species: C. lamyana

Binomial name
- Cryphaea lamyana (Mont.) Müll. Hal.

Species of moss

Cryphaea lamyana is an aquatic moss found in unpolluted rivers, It is local or rare throughout its range and in the UK is restricted to a few sites in Cornwall and Devon and a number of sites on the River Teifi where it is most commonly found.

Its common name is multi-fruited river moss so named because of the spherical orange capsules in which it bears its spores.
