= Fontinalis dalecarlica =

Scientific classification
- Kingdom: Plantae
- Clade: Embryophytes
- Division: Bryophyta
- Class: Bryopsida
- Subclass: Bryidae
- Order: Hypnales
- Family: Fontinalaceae
- Genus: Fontinalis
- Species: F. dalecarlica

Binomial name
- Fontinalis dalecarlica Bruch & Schimp.

Species of moss

Fontinalis dalecarlica, commonly referred to as slender water moss or cupped water moss, is a species of moss from the genus Fontinalis, in the family Fontinalaceae. It is a submerged freshwater aquatic plant native to Europe and North America.

== Description ==
F. dalecarlica often has a green or yellowish color (sometimes reddish) with a nearly black stem. Stems are often 10-50 cm long, although they may grow as long as 100 cm. The leaves are 2-4mm long, ovate-lanceolate to lanceolate in shape, and lack a midrib. When wet, the leaves are deeply cupped, and the stem of this species is long-attenuate and floppy. When dry, the leaves become flattened with very reflexed margins. The stem is resistant to considerable abrasion, which allows it to persist in environments with swift water. Branches are long attenuated as well, and the tips are tight and budlike. Egg-shaped capsules are 2mm in length and are covered by the leaves. It attaches to a substrate with strongly bound rhizoids.

== Distribution and habitat ==
F. dalecarlica is native to North America and parts of Europe. In North America, its range extends north to south from the Northwest Territories to Georgia and Alabama, and east to west from Newfoundland and Labrador to the Northwest Territories. It is also found in Greenland and many northern European countries. It has been observed growing in first, second, and third order streams, in rapids, pools, and lakes on rocky and woody substrates. F. dalecarlica can be found in shallower areas that are intermittently above the water level due to its ability to persist out of the water for at least a year. Many similar aquatic plants cannot persist in such habitats.

== Reproduction ==
F. dalecarlica can reproduce asexually by stoloniferous branches and sexually via an archegonium and an antheridium, although the exact method by which sperm are consistently transported to eggs upstream in swift currents is not well documented.
