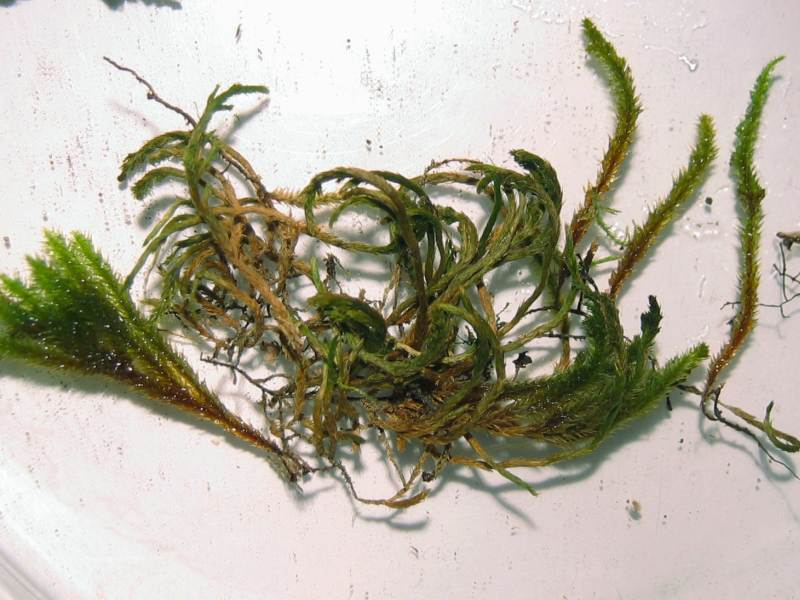

Scientific classification
- Kingdom: Plantae
- Division: Bryophyta
- Class: Bryopsida
- Subclass: Bryidae
- Order: Hypnales
- Family: Leucodontaceae
- Genus: Leucodon
- Species: L. sciuroides

Binomial name
- Leucodon sciuroides (Hedw.) Schwägr.

= Leucodon sciuroides =

Species of moss

Leucodon sciuroides is a species of mosses belonging to the family Leucodontaceae.

It has cosmopolitan distribution.
