= Fänggen =

Female wood sprites from Tyrolean folklore

A Fängge (plural Fänggen) is a wood sprite or a subtype of wild women in German folklore, found in German-speaking parts of the Alpine Region into more northerly non-Alpine parts of Bavaria (Upper Palatinate).

The Fängge has been conceived of strictly as female, a hairy, ugly giantess (counterpart of the moss-grown male giant (Note: German: Riesen.) or wild man). However, the gender demarcation is vague. Also, the spirit when called by the variant name Fankerl or Waldfänken tends to be regarded as a dwarf. They are called Fankel, Fank (var. Fengge; and feminine Fanka, Fanga) in some parts of Austria (Note: Around Vorarlberg.) where they are considered to be "wild folk" of either sex, but less monstrous.

== Nomenclature ==
The singular term is Fangga, Fanggin, or Fängge (also transcribed as Faengge). Plural terms are Fanggen, we Fänggen, Wildfangg, Wildfanggen or Wildfängl (Note: Reiser cited by Bäschlin (1930), p. 1186, n42) (Note: Cf. Hinterstein legend about the male Wildfängl eradicated by woodsmen.) (both wild = 'wild', latter diminutive), wilde Weiber (wild women).

Fängge in the broad sense refers to a nature spirit, either gigantic or dwarfish, in Bavaria (Upper Palatinate), Liechtenstein, Tyrol, as well as in Switzerland, in the Canton of Grisons (called Graubünden in German; e.g. villages of Furna and Davon (Note: Runberg asserts ambivalence regarding the stature: "Waldfänken [of the Canton of Grisons] are not so grim as the ""Fanggen"" yet they, too, are giant-like and hairy,.. Sometimes they are said to be dwarf-like".)) and Canton of St. Gallen (e.g. Sargans). They are considered the Tyrolean equivalent of (local subtype of) the generic "wild women".

The Fängge (var. Fangga) is a giantess as tall as a tree, according to the lore of Tyrol and the Bavarian Alps.

The Fankerl (plural Fankerln) is a type of bearded dwarf with flashy red eyes living on the Pfreimd River according to the lore of the Upper Palatinate, Bavaria, and it is counted as a type of Fängge. It is noted that Fankerl is a word for the 'devil' across Bavaria into Austria, (Note: Citing Grimm and Seidl.) and since the term Fankerl term Fanken also occurs as a diminutive of Fan 'devil' in Nordic languages (Swedish, Danish), (Note: Schmeller lists only the definitions as 'devil' or 'naughty boy', but notes the term to be a diminutive (hypocorism) of Fant, Fantel which he identifies to be the Spadi-Fantl (Jack of Spades) of playing cards.) so Alfred Bäschlin (1930) notes that the term applied to a folkloric spirit is probably usage in the secondary and marginal sense of the word.

The Waldfänken, the mythical wood-dwellers of Switzerland, also resemble dwarves (though sometimes milder-tempered giants also), with superhuman strength. The term Fänken is glossed in Swiss dialect as Mannli (standard German: Mannlein; English: 'mannikin'); thus they are also called Wildmannli ('wild mannikin'), though this term (var. wilde Männlin) appears to denote the men-folk, while terms such as Waldfänken or Holzmüzen were reserved for the women-folk. Cf. lore around the village of Furna, below. (Note: Serehnard, Nicolin (1872) [from year 1742], quoted in Bäschlin (1930), p. 1186, and cited as n17.)

The variants Fankel, Fank in the lore of Tyrol and Vorarlberg, Austria has the female Fanka, Fanga in company. This Fankel said to denote "wild folk" (wilde Leute) turned devil, as happens with various creatures of pagan belief. (Note: Grimm speculates the Fankel must have originally been a light elf (shining or radiating spirit), which can readily be connected to Funk[e] 'spark" and similar such words ("lichtelbe (ljósálfar) gelten aber fur leuchtende, strahlende geister und keine schwierig hat es auch die benennungen fank oder feng auf fanke funke oder fangen, fängen incendere zu beziehen".)

There are also the Fengge (var. Fengg; pl.: Fenggen) of Vorarlberg, which are described as less sinister, (Note: As compared with the Tyrolean waldfänken (actually Fan) described by von Alpenburg.) or smaller-sized yet powerful.

== General description ==
As stated, Fängge or Fangga in the lore of Tyrol and the Bavarian Alps is that of an ogress. The giantess is as tall as a tree. (Note: Cf. Nassereith forest under § Folktales and legends.) Its body is hairy or bristled. Her head hair is black, strewn with strands of beard lichen (Note: The obsolete Latin species name Lichen barbatus, given by various sources, is synonymous to accepted taxon Usnea barbata. Another sources less precisely state that her hair is "interspersed with lichen" or with lichen and moss. It appears that Baumbart according to original sources (beard lichen) was mistaken for Baumbast (tree bast) by Bäschlin.) and hang down her back. She is the female counterpart (wife) of the male giant of the region, who is also grown over with lichen and moss.

The Fängge's gaping mouth reaches from ear to ear, and her voices are deep as a man's. Her eyes are black, but sometimes glows or flashes like lightning. She wears a jackets made from tree bark, and apron/skirt (Note: Shurze.) made from wildcat pelts, or shaggy skirts (Note: Zottelshurze.) made from fox or other animal pelt.

The life of the Fänggen is bound to the trees of the forest, with a special affinity to large and old trees. If such a tree is felled or dies, then the respective Fangga has to die. If the whole forest is logged, the Fänggen disappear altogether. The Fängge being a personification of giant trees, each Fängge individual bears a proper name like a human: e.g., Stutzfärche, Stutzferche or Stutzforche (all: 'Pruned-Pine/Fir'), (Note: The name is glossed as Stutzföhre, where Föhre has been defined as "(Scotch) fir" with Latin name Pinus sylvestris, and this species actually answers to common name of "Scotch Pine". Taylor glosses the name Stutzfärche as "the fir". Taylor also renders the thicket of Tanne ("fir") as "the pines".) (Note: The names normalized in German as Stutzföhre ("fir, pine") or Stutz-Katze ("Cat") are discussed but the meaning of the prefix Stutz is not explicitly clarified by Taylor. German-English dictionary renders Stutz as "anything curtailed", with compounds for a clipped tail or a pruned bush; cf. stutzen "trim a beard; prune a tree".) Rauhrinde, Rohrinta or Rohrinde (all: 'Rough-Bark'), Hochrinta or Hoachrinta (both: 'High-Bark'), and Stuzza-Muzza, Stutzemutze or Stutzamutza (all: 'Clipped-Cat'[?]). These names which vary occur in the folktale (several versions) regarding a Fängge-girl hired as housemaid. (Note: Cf. the maid story with variant under § Folktales and legends)

The Fänggen are man-eaters, preferring the flesh of children (which is why children should never leave the house in the evening), but they will also eat adult persons. They also steal children as well as women who just gave birth. (Note: "sie rauben Wöchnerinnen und Kinder". Cf. below, the Paznaun tale of bearded Fangga in the kitchen, trying to replace the mother she killed.) They further exchange newborn unbaptized children for changelings (recension in Swiss German). (Note: Bäschlin (1930), p. 1186, n15, citing Schw. Id. (Schweizerisches Idiotikon).)

Fänggen (in the narrower sense) are always female, their husbands being the Waldriesen (forest giants; sg. Waldriese), wilde Männer (wild men; sg. wilder Mann) or Waldmänner (forest men; sg. Waldmann). Those giants are a danger to their own offspring, though, which is why the Fänggen give their daughters away to human farms for them to serve there as maids. Such a Fangga-maid will never take on the Christian faith and will return to the woods as soon as she hears that one of her kind has died.

As already noted, some local notions of this wild woman is regarded as dwarfish, whether the Waldfänken of Switzerland, or Fengge of Austria. However, rather than there being regional differences as to the conception of size, one explanation offered is that even where the giant waldmuter ("wood-mother") carrying a whole fir-tree as a staff had been part of folklore, the stature of the being was diminished as time passed on, becoming a wilde fänkenmannli (Note: i.e., a "wild fänke diminutive human") barely 3 feet tall, also swapping their forest dwellings for cave-holes.

In an 18th-century commentary on the Swiss Waldfänken back in the days when the hamlet of Furna only had a few settlements, the wild folk (wilde Leuthe) dwelled nearby in the Valley of Davos (Note: Original text gives "Vall Dafos".) (within Grisons canton). These Waldfänken were human-like but thicker and shorter and covered with hair except for the eyes. They lived there until driven away by the church bells of Furna. In this Swiss account, the men-folk were called wilde Männlin while the women were called Waldfänken or Holzmüzen. And extraordinarily, these women had sagging breasts "so long that she can throw them over her shoulders", which have been compared to the wild woman with drooping breasts described in the Arthurian Romance Wigalois. (Note: This pendulous-breasted she-monster called Rûel is not explicitly called a wild woman in Wigalois.) (Note: Cf. also the tales re the Fangga named Langtüttin ("Long breast"), below.)

The chamois are the livestock herds of the Fänggen which is why the Fänggen are hostile to chamois-hunters. In one tale, a Fangga visits a hunter who stayed at a huntsman's hut with the chamois he gunned down, and she threatens to tear him to pieces for killing one of their cows. When the hunter counters he will shoot her, she retracts her threat, but shows the man their stable where one stall is left empty, and the man decided never to take another chamois again. Similar legends about protection of the chamois is ascribed to the Salige Frau or the wilde Fräulein.

== Folktales and legends ==
A tale tells of a maid of great strength but unknown identity hired by a peasant in Fließ. The maid refused to learn anything of Christianity. Once the peasant was coming home from the Imst market, and passed through the Bannwald (protected forest) when he heard a loud cry addressing him: "Yoke-bearer", (for he was shouldering the yokes after selling off the oxen at the market) "tell Stutzamutza, Hoachrinta is dead". When he reported this back home, the maid cried "Mother, mother!" and bolted off towards the forest. Later reports arrived that she was stealing and devouring children, inheriting the role of her mother. A variant where the Fangge's forest is described as lying between Landeck and Ladis on the bank of the Inn River, a local shepherd from Urgen hamlet (part of Fließ, in the foregoing tale version) (Note: Both Urgen and Fließ are approximately between Landeck and Ladis on the map.) takes in a girl as maid, similar development ensues, two local men bring news to "Tell Stutz-Färche ('fir') that Rohrinde ('rough bark') is dead". These tales are recognized as paralleling the "Death of Pan" motif. (Note: As suggested by Taylor's paper in which these tales are given as examples.)

The Fangga of the Nassereith forest in Tyrol was reputed to be the size of a medium-sized tree, and preyed on young boys. She would sniff the boys as if taking a pinch of snuff up her up her nose. or kill them cruelly by rubbing the boys against prickly-branched trees, until they were grated into dust. Wilhelm Mannhardt compared this to the Bohemian Forest folklore of the Zutodekitzeln ("Death-Tickle"), which can be explained as the natural phenomenon of whirlwind (causing lacerations).

In another legend, a Fangga came to a peasant's home in Paznaun, Tirol, and abducted a new mother who just delivered a baby, tearing her to pieces. The Fangga then assumed a spot in the kitchen, trying to take a place of the dead mother, though she tricked the daughter, the ugly woman with a shaggy bearded could not pass herself off to the husband.

The story of a peasant who pretended his name was "Saltton" (meaning "Dunnit-myself" (Note: Explained in standard German as Selbtan or Selbstgetan.)) to escape the Fangga is a story of the Polyphemus type. (Note: Where the cyclops Polyphemus receives no help by screaming he was hurt by "Nobody", which was Odysseus's fake name.) A peasant of Arzl in Oberinntal while out hunting for firewood gets captured and was about to be eaten, but suggests he would taste better cooked than raw. While the Fangga was trying to split a log apart with her hands, he removed the wedge so that it snapped shut trapping her hand. She made an outcry shouting that Saltton (Did-it-Myself) was responsible for her misery, to which the would-be helper only replied "Saltton, salt g'litten (Did it yourself, then suffer yourself)". (Note: Explained in standard German as Selbstgelitten.)

According to the lore of Hinterstein, Oberallgäu, Bavaria, a hairy and rough male Wildfängl lived in the mountain slopes of the Hintersteinertal and was hostile to the local folk, causing much mischief. The woodcutters were working at the local Erzstieg trail near Erzberg mountain, with the Erzbach stream nearby forming a ravine. They saw the Wildfängl and bribed him with gifts, and connived him into sticking his hand in a wedged split log, then made it snap shut. The Wildfängl howled in agony but the lumberjacks mercilessly cut the huge tree down and tumbled it down the ravine, the victim and all. The Wildfängl was not seen again.

There is also the legend of the Tirolean Fangga named Langtüttin ("Long breast"). (Note: Langtüttin is not specified as Fangga in original tale (ed. Zingerele), but so identified by Mannhardt and by Runeberg.) From one breast flowed milk, but from the other breast flowed venom (pus). She forcibly insists on breastfeeding the boy and cooking for him, detaining him a few days, but the boy makes a getaway, taking advantage of the presence of a cross which she is unable to go beyond. Oversized breasts are discussed as generally symbolic of vegetative divinities.

== See also ==
- Basajaun and Basandere - Basque wild man and wild woman, abhor church bells, outwitted by human fake name (Polyphemus motif).

== Bibliography ==
- Bächtold-Stäubli, Hanns [in German]; Hoffmann-Krayer, Eduard, eds. (1927–1987) [1927–1941]. Handwörterbuch des Deutschen Aberglaubens. Berlin: Walter de Gruyter.
  - Reprint 2000, ISBN 978-3-11-016860-0
  - Band 2 (1930) C – Frautragen.
  - Band 4 (1932) Hieb- und stichfest-Knistern.
  - Band 6 (1935) Mauer-Pflugbrot
- Alpenburg, Johann Nepomuk von [in German] (1857). Mythen und Sagen Tirols. Zürich: Meyer und Zeller.
- Bernheimer, Richard (1952). Wild Men in the Middle Ages. Cambridge, MA: Harvard University Press; snippet (Reprint: New York : Octagon books, 1979, ISBN 0-374-90616-5)
- Mannhardt, Wilhelm (1904) [1875]. Wald- und Feldkulte. Vol. 1 (2 ed.). Berlin: Gebrüder Borntraeger. (reprint: Elibron Classics, 2005, ISBN 978-1-42124740-3)
- Vonbun, Franz Josef [in German] (1862). "II. Elbische wesen. 3. Fänken". Beiträge zur deutschen Mythologie. Chur: Leonhard Hitz. pp. 44–65.
- Zaunert, Paul (1921). "5tes Buch. Der Wald/Die wilden Leute". Deutsche Natursagen: I. Von Holden und Unholden. Jena: Eugen Dietrich. pp. 66–. (reprint: Paderborn: Salzwasser Verlag 2012, ISBN 978-3-84600253-7)
