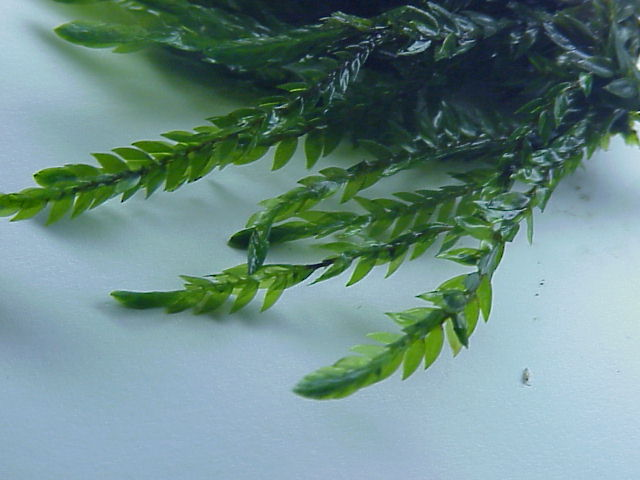

Scientific classification
- Kingdom: Plantae
- Division: Bryophyta
- Class: Bryopsida
- Subclass: Bryidae
- Order: Hypnales
- Family: Fontinalaceae
- Genus: Fontinalis
- Species: F. antipyretica

Binomial name
- Fontinalis antipyretica Hedw.

= Fontinalis antipyretica =

Species of aquatic moss

Fontinalis antipyretica, greater water-moss, or common water moss, is a species of submerged aquatic moss belonging to the subclass Bryidae. It is found in both still and flowing freshwater in Europe, Asia, Greenland and Africa. In North America it is found in most Canadian provinces with a seaboard and most US states except the most southern.

== Description ==
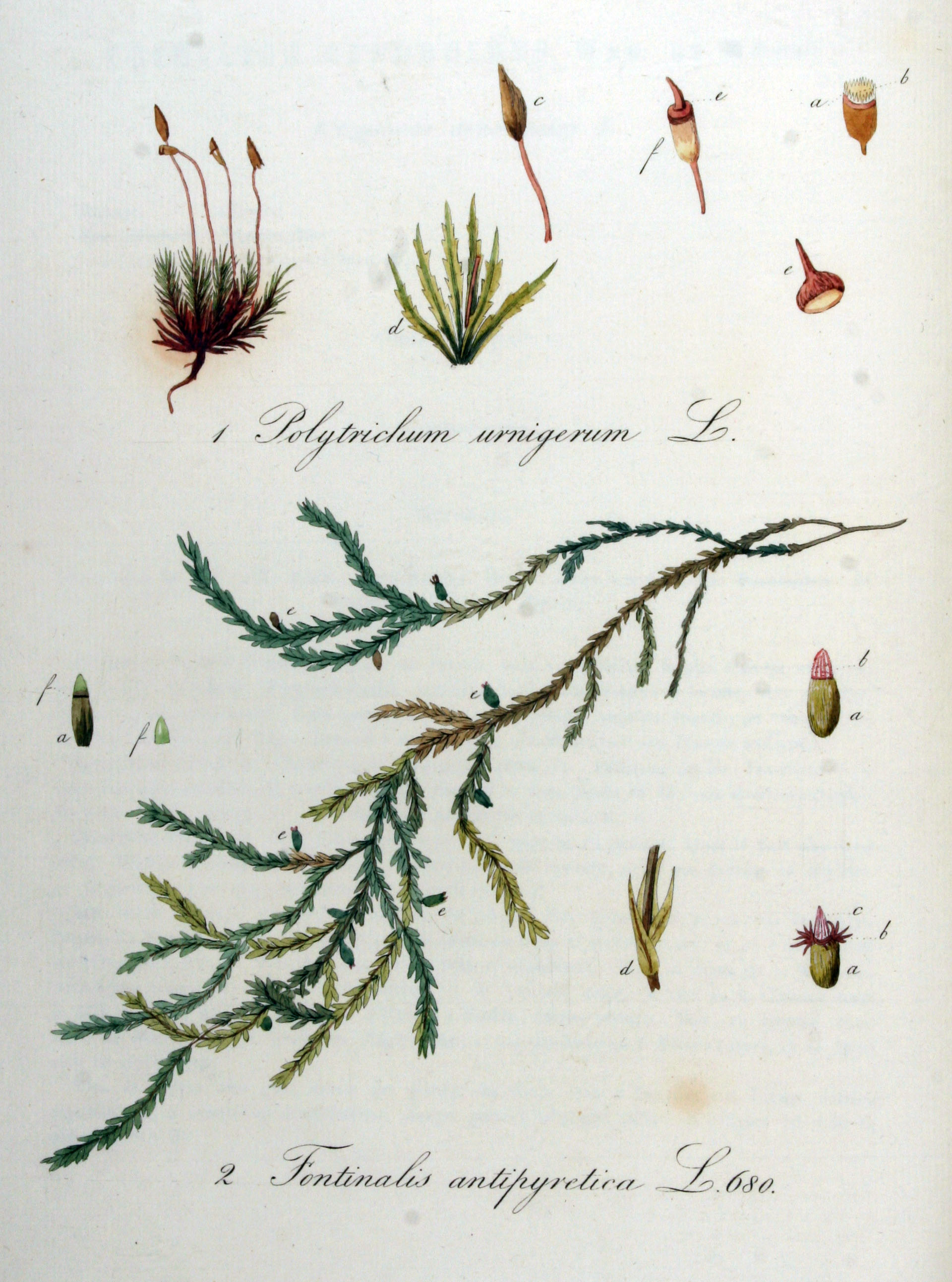
Fontinalis antipyretica (below) in Flora Batava, 1846

F. antipyretica (Note: The name is new Latin, from Latin fons, spring (of water), anti, against, and Greek πυρ (pyr), fire, meaning "the water moss that stops fire", because of its use in medieval europe to extinguish fires.) has branched, trailing stems that are triangular in cross-section and may be as long as 60 cm (24 in). The leaves are quite stiff and are arranged in three overlapping rows. Each leaf is lance-shaped or egg-shaped, with a keel and a sharp point, some 4 to 9 mm (0.16 to 0.35 in) long. There are no flowers but minute spores are sometimes produced in smooth sporangia (capsules) between 2 and 2.6 mm (0.08 and 0.10 in) long.

== Distribution and habitat ==
F. antipyretica is found in Europe, Asia and parts of Africa. It grows attached to submerged rocks in fast-flowing water. It also occurs attached to the substrate in lakes and as floating masses in still water, and may be cast up on beaches at the waterside. It thrives in shady positions and prefers acidic water, with a pH of around 8.4 being the maximum tolerated. It is replaced in highly acid mountain and moorland streams in the UK by Fontinalis squamosa.

== Biology ==
Reproduction is mostly by stolons or by the rooting of detached fragments. Sexual reproduction does also occur, in the spring in North America, but is relatively unimportant as a means of reproduction. Individual plants are either male or female and the capsules housing the spores are seldom observed.

The species is the first aquatic gametophyte plant to have its genome documented, as well as the first of the Fontinalis genus to be documented. It has 16,538 total genes with a genome that's 385.2 Mbp in size. It is monophyletic.

== Ecology ==
F. antipyretica grows in large clumps and mats and provides refuge for fish eggs and fry. Numerous invertebrates shelter among the fronds; Chironomid larvae hide in the bases of the leaves and mayfly, caddisfly and stonefly larvae cling to the fronds, and in fast-flowing water black fly larvae are often present. Diatoms and other microscopic algae grow epiphytically on the fronds.

== Heavy metal adsorption ==
It has been found that F. antipyretica can adsorb cadmium and zinc, with maximum biosorption of cadmium being 28 milligrams (0.43 gr) per gram of dried moss, and of zinc 11 to 15 milligrams (0.17 to 0.23 gr) (depending on water temperature). The biosorption of cadmium was unaffected by the hardness of the water but that of zinc was affected by rising calcium levels.

== Aquarium uses ==
F. antipyretica was traditionally used in cool-water aquaria, but in tropical aquaria the similarly structured "Java moss" ( a Vesicularia species) takes its place.
