= Dendropogonella =

Scientific classification
- Kingdom: Plantae
- Division: Bryophyta
- Class: Bryopsida
- Subclass: Bryidae
- Order: Hypnales
- Family: Cryphaeaceae
- Genus: Dendropogonella; E. Britton 1906
- Species: D. rufescens

Binomial name
- Dendropogonella rufescens (Schimp.) E.Britton

Synonyms
- Cleistostoma elegans Bruch; Clidostoma rufulus Mart.; Cryphaea rufescens (Schimp.) Müll. Hal.; Dendropogon rufescens Schimp.

Genus of mosses

Dendropogonella is a genus of mosses (Bryophyta) with only one known species, Dendropogonella rufescens. It is found in South America (Brazil, Costa Rica, Guatemala, Mexico, Venezuela).
