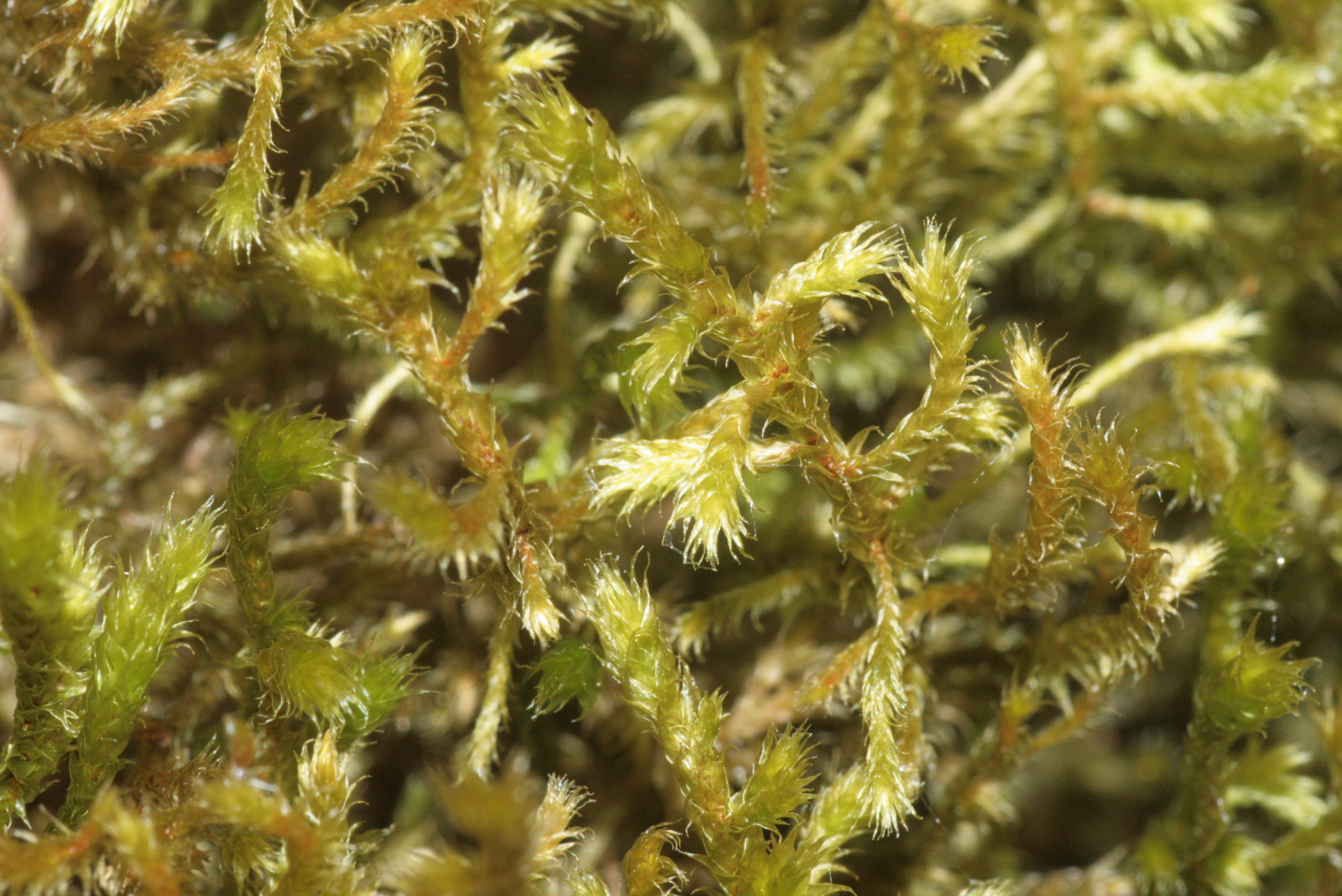
- Antitrichia curtipendula close up

Scientific classification
- Kingdom: Plantae
- Clade: Embryophytes
- Division: Bryophyta
- Class: Bryopsida
- Subclass: Bryidae
- Order: Hypnales
- Family: Leucodontaceae
- Genus: Antitrichia
- Species: A. curtipendula

Binomial name
- Antitrichia curtipendula Bridel-Brederi

= Antitrichia curtipendula =

Species of moss

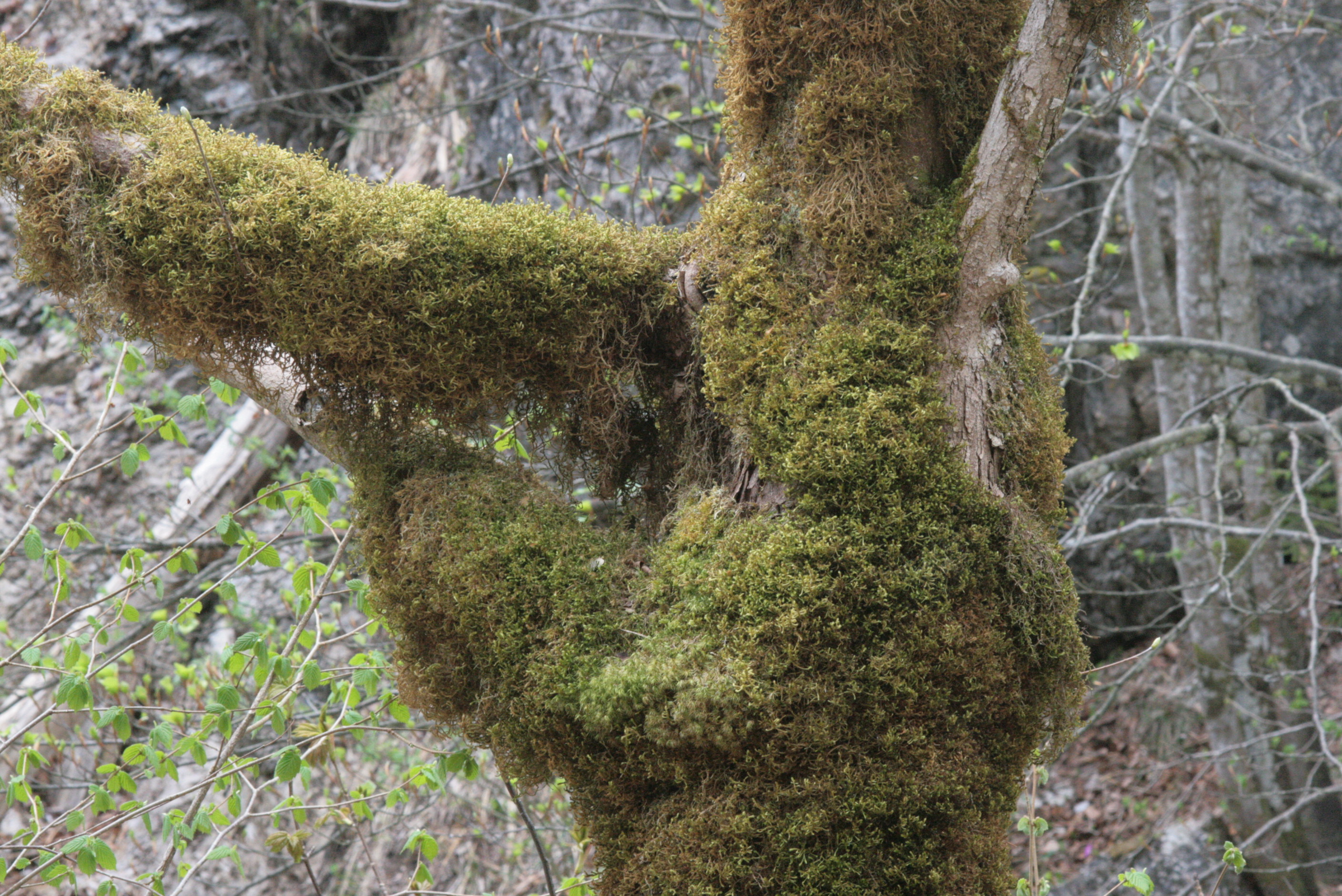
Antitrichia curtipendula on a tree

Antitrichia curtipendula (also known as pendulous wing moss or hanging moss) is a species of feather-moss found predominantly in western North America and the western coast of Europe.

== Description ==
Antitrichia curtipendula has dark red stems and green “leaves” that give the overall mat of intertwined stems a rusty yellow looking color. This color varies in intensity depending on the level of moisture being held within the organism. The stems of Hanging Moss can grow up to 15–30 cm long and are host to a leaf with, upon close examination, three midribs. One main and longer midrib going down the center and two fainter and shorter ones on either side. This particular aspect of the leaf sets it apart from other similar Epiphytes like the Rhytidiadelphus loreus (Lanky Moss). Found higher in the canopy than some mosses, Antitrichia curtipendula likes to form large clumps on branches, stumps, and tree trunks, looking like a cross between a blanket and a carpet.

== Biogeography ==
Antitrichia curtipendula is native to North America, spanning the western coastline from southern Alaska down to northern California. In California particularly, this moss’ distribution is almost entirely similar to that of the coastal redwoods. This moss likes a moderate coastal climate that renders its habitat seasonally moist. Some other locations that this particular species has been found are Denmark, the Eastern coast of Norway near Stockholm, Austria, the Western coast of France, and the Western coast of Spain. The locations in Western Europe where Hanging Moss has been found are much smaller areas than those in Western North America, where the moss’ habitat is more extensive. This moss prefers a temperate climate with moderate temperatures and moderate to high amounts of precipitation. This moss is found in low to high elevation forests, ranging from around 0–2100 meters in elevation that are predominantly coniferous type trees. They can be found in the forest canopy growing on limbs, branches, stumps and sometimes rocks.

== Ecology ==
While not being parasites, Epiphytes need a host to grow on. Unlike parasites, they do not cause any damage to the host on which they grow. Their host plant only provides support and a vantage point at which to reach the nutrients needed to grow. Hanging moss does not grow roots into the ground, instead growing complex root systems upon their host plant, that weave themselves into a tight mat and provide structure and support to the overall moss community. Living up off the forest floor allows these epiphytes to gain access to the precipitation falling through the forest canopy. Epiphytes engage in photosynthesis, gaining their energy from the incoming solar radiation. Living in the canopy not on the forest floor also gives these organisms access to more sunshine than they would get otherwise. They obtain nutrients and water from the air, eliminating the need for roots that occupy the soil.

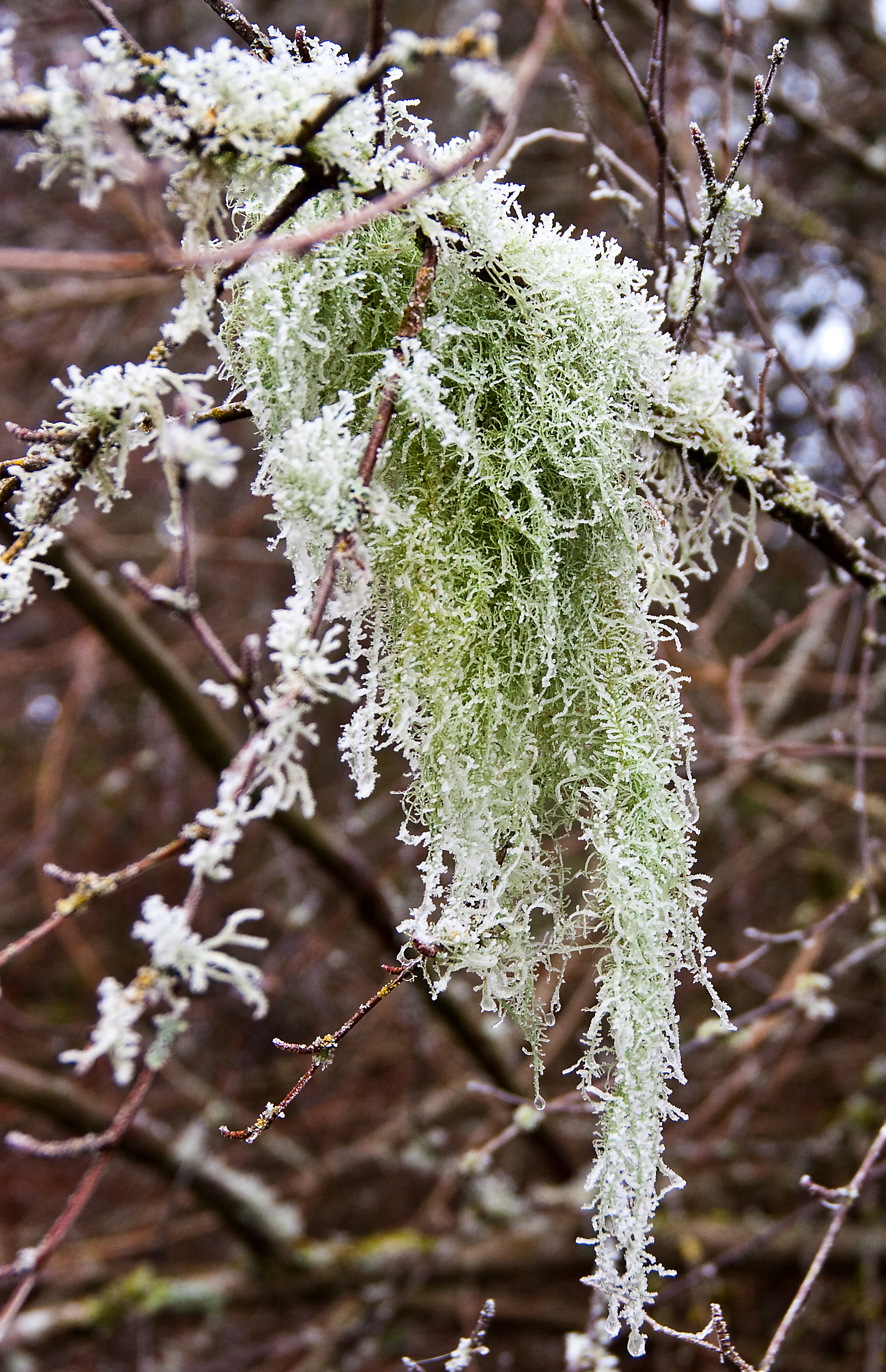
Hanging moss with ice crystals (8404478990)

== Taxonomy ==
Similar to Rhytidiadelphus mosses, Antitrichia curtipendula is close to Rhytidiadelphus loreus (Lanky Moss) a moss which also has red stems and green leaves and forms mat like structures with their root systems. Unlike Antitrichia curtipendula, this epiphyte will sometimes grow on the ground, climbing upwards with long creeping branches. Unlike the Antitrichia curtipendula, which has three midribs on its leaf, Rhytidiadelphus loreus has a double midrib leaf. Like Antitrichia curtipendula, Rhytidiadelphus loreus and other Rhytidiadelphus species thrive in coastal maritime environments with high potential evapotranspiration. Also related to Antitrichia curtipendula is Rhytidiadelphus squarrosus or bent-leaf moss. As its name implies, the leaf of Rhytidiadelphus squarrosus is characteristically bent and it prefers to grow in open shady areas where persistent moisture is present and other vegetation is minimal, instead of in the forest canopy.

== Reproduction ==
Mosses prefer a shady environment that allows for a consistently moist environment. Antitrichia curtipendula is a small flowerless and seedless plant that reproduces by spores. After germination and when first developing, moss will develop a thin, felt like structure on damp soil, rocks, tree bark, or rocks. This transitional stage in the life cycle of moss leads to the growth of gametophore which then develops into stems and leaves. Wind is an important distributor of moss spores. Since these mosses do not want to grow on the forest floor, they cannot simply fall to the ground and take root. Wind distribution allows for the moss spores to reach a greater distance than they otherwise would and allows for the spores to attach to surfaces within the canopy. Along with wind, insects and birds play a role in helping the reproduction of epiphytes like the hanging moss. When birds and insects land on or brush against moss, they can retain spores on their bodies, carrying them through the forest to where ever they land next. This process has the ability to spread moss spores even farther than the wind might.

== Current threats ==
Antitrichia curtipendula is susceptible to anything that threatens the hosts on which they grow. Since epiphytic mosses generally grow on trees, factors that threaten tree growth and health also threaten their growth. Threats such as deforestation alter the habitat in which these mosses grow. After this habitat is altered, they need to wait for the tree canopy to grow back before they are able to then inhabit the area once again. These mosses tend to inhabit mid to old growth forests for the particular reason that these forests are already established enough to provide good structural support for these epiphytes. Also, because these mosses are slow growing, which means to get a structurally sound community in one spot, they need to develop over time.

== Bibliography ==
- C.C. Newberry. (Accessed 2019). Antitricia Curtipendula, Flora of North America, vol 28, p591-593. Retrieved from http://dev.semanticfna.org/Antitrichia_curtipendula
- H. Warnst. (Accessed 2019). Introduction to Bryophytes, The Public Face of Biology. Retrieved from http://blogs.ubc.ca/biology321/?page_id=983
- K. Fretwell, I. Cruickshank, B. Starzomski. (2014). Biodiversity of the Central Coast: Hanging wing-moss, hanging moss, Antitrichia Curtipendula. Retrieved from https://www.centralcoastbiodiversity.org/hanging-wing-moss-bull-antitrichia-curtipendula.html
- K. Fretwell, B. Starzomski. (2013). Biodiversity of the Central Coast: Lanky Moss, Rhytidiadelphus Loreus. Retrieved from https://www.centralcoastbiodiversity.org/lanky-moss-bull-rhytidiadelphus-loreus.html
- Montana Field Guides. An Antitrichia Moss- Antitrichia Curtipendula. Retrieved from http://fieldguide.mt.gov/%5C/speciesDetail.aspx?elcode=NBMUS0D020
- R.Welch.(2007). Epiphytes: An ecosystem contained within an ecosystem. Retrieved from http://jrscience.wcp.muohio.edu/fieldcourses07/PapersCostaRicaArticles/Epiphytes.Anecosystemcont.html
