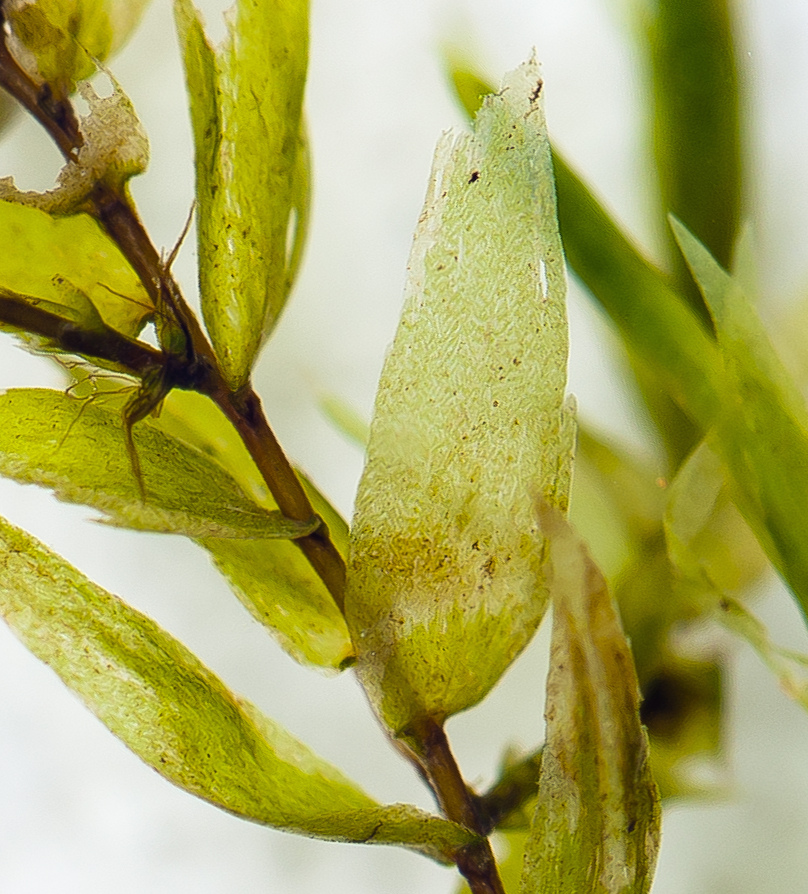

Scientific classification
- Kingdom: Plantae
- Division: Bryophyta
- Class: Bryopsida
- Subclass: Bryidae
- Order: Hypnales
- Family: Fontinalaceae
- Genus: Fontinalis
- Species: F. hypnoides

Binomial name
- Fontinalis hypnoides C.J.Hartman, 1843

= Fontinalis hypnoides =

Species of moss

Fontinalis hypnoides is a species of moss belonging to the family Fontinalaceae.

It is native to Eurasia and Northern America.
