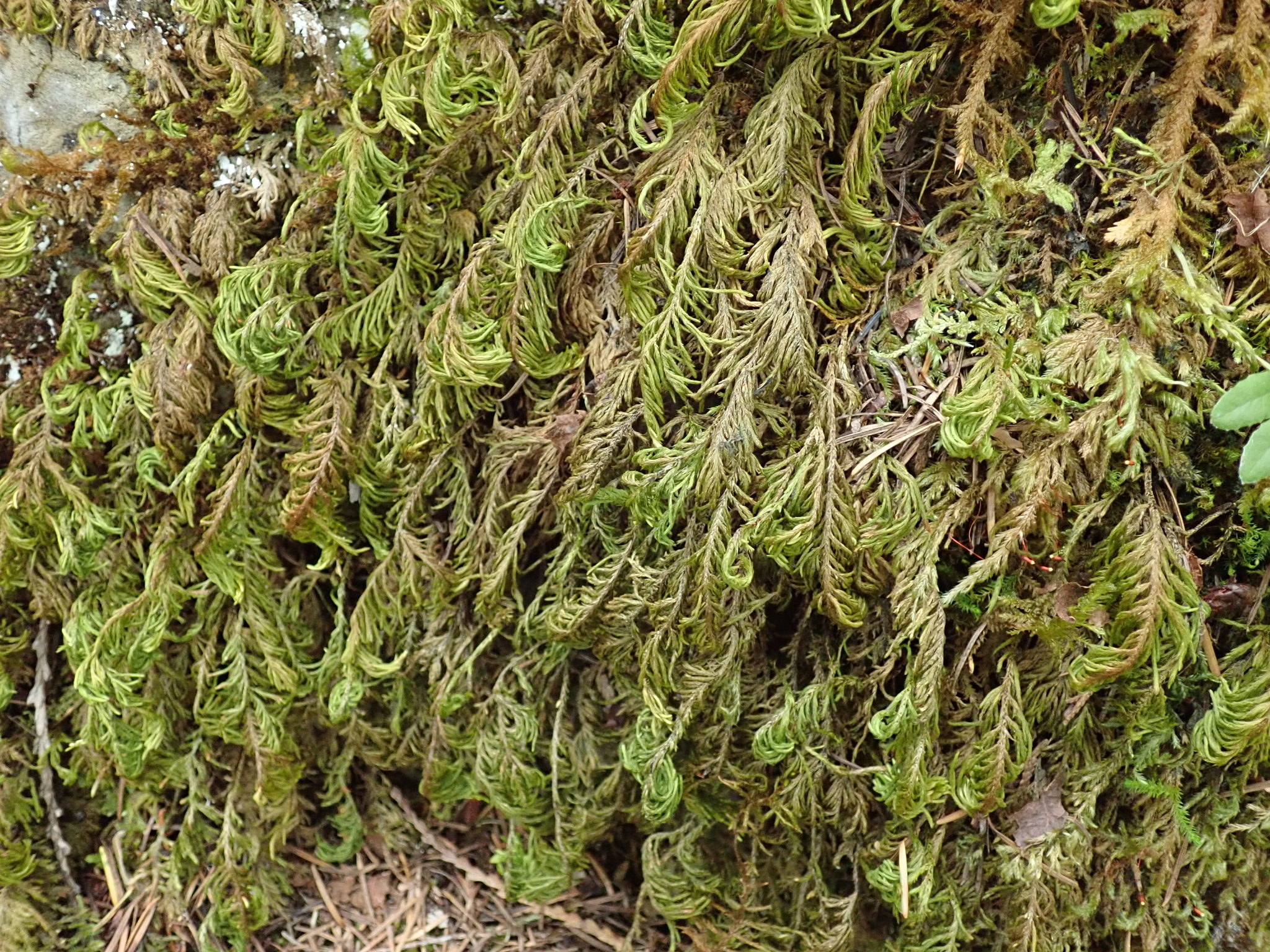

Scientific classification
- Kingdom: Plantae
- Division: Bryophyta
- Class: Bryopsida
- Subclass: Bryidae
- Order: Hypnales
- Family: Cryphaeaceae
- Genus: Dendroalsia; E.Britton
- Species: D. abietina

Binomial name
- Dendroalsia abietina (Hook.) E.Britton

= Dendroalsia =

Genus of mosses

Dendroalsia abietina is a species of moss. The only species in the genus Dendroalsia, it is a rather large and conspicuous moss. It's easy to recognize when dry, because each stem curls downward like a clenched fist.

== Range ==
Dendroalsia is common moss throughout the Pacific Northwest (California, Oregon, Washington, and into British Columbia). Its range extends from Los Angeles County and the Channel Islands to Vancouver Island. It is very common in the oak woodlands of the Inner Coast Ranges, Sacramento Valley, and Willamette Valley.

== Habitat ==
It often covers whole tree trunks, leaving little room for competition, but also occurs on rocks. While other mosses such as Antitrichia california/Antitrichia curtipendula favor the bases of oak trees, Dendroalsia is more common on the trunks.
