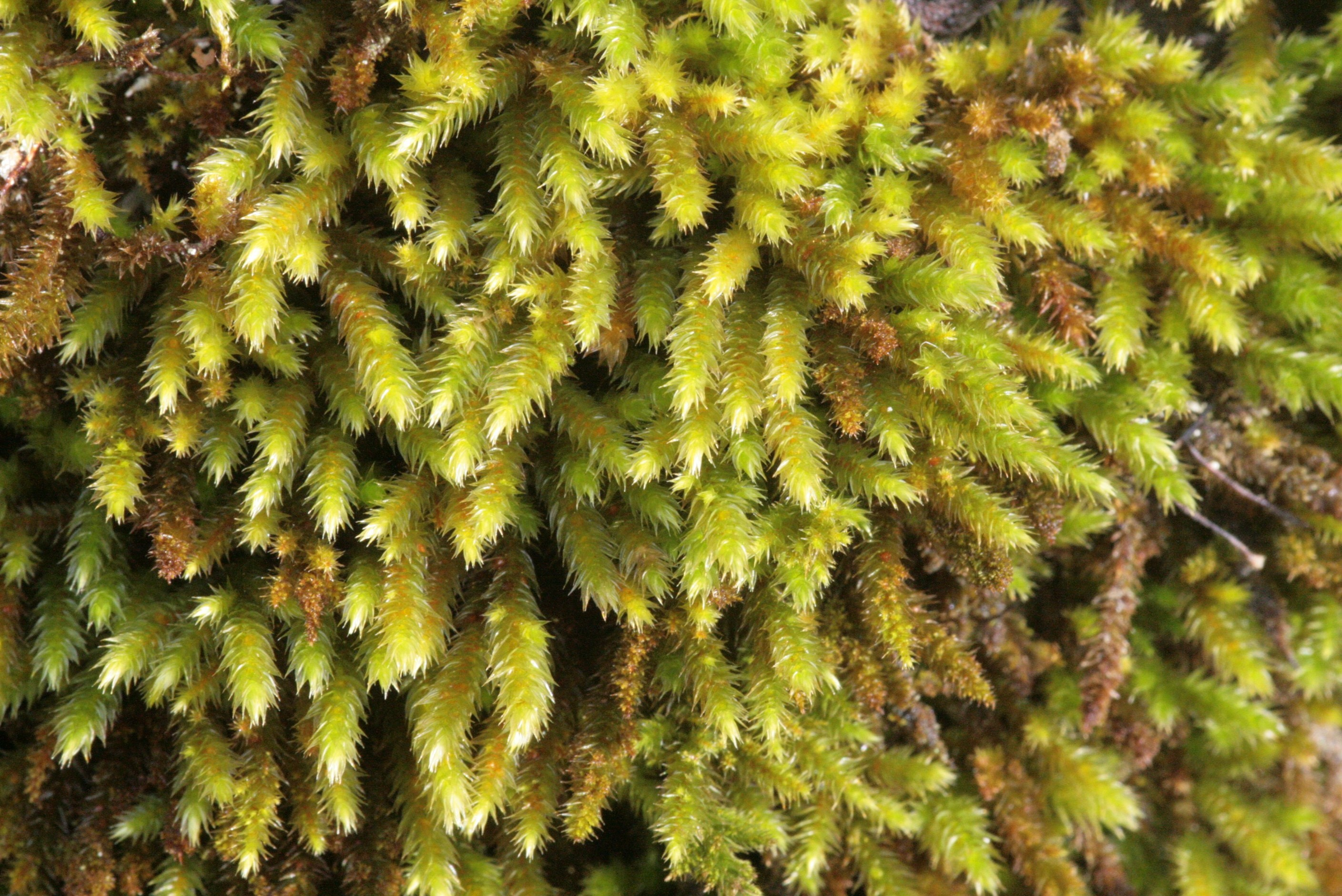
- Leucodon sciuroides

Scientific classification
- Kingdom: Plantae
- Division: Bryophyta
- Class: Bryopsida
- Subclass: Bryidae
- Order: Hypnales
- Family: Leucodontaceae
- Genus: Leucodon; Schwägr., 1816

= Leucodon =

Genus of mosses

Leucodon is a genus of mosses belonging to the family Leucodontaceae.

The genus was first described by Christian Friedrich Schwägrichen in 1816.

The genus has cosmopolitan distribution.

== Taxonomy ==
=== Species ===
- Leucodon andrewsianus (H. A. Crum & L. E. Anderson) W. D. Reese & L. E. Anderson
- Leucodon atrovirens Nog.
- Leucodon brachypus Bridel
- Leucodon coreensis Cardot
- Leucodon flagellaris Lindb. ex Broth – Whip-like moss
- Leucodon immersus Lindb.
- Leucodon julaceus (Hedwig) Sullivant – Smooth hook moss
- Leucodon nipponicus Nog.
- Leucodon pendulus Lindb.
- Leucodon sapporensis Besch. – Sapporo white-toothed moss
- Leucodon sciuroides (Hedw.) Schwägr. – Squirrel-tail moss
- Leucodon secundus (Harv.) Mitt.
- Leucodon sinensis Thér.
- Leucodon sohayakiensis H. Akiyama
- Leucodon temperatus H.Akiyama
- Leucodon treleasei (Cardot) Paris
