= Cryphaea =

Cryphaea is the scientific name of two genera of organisms and may refer to:

- Cryphaea (moth), a genus of insects in the family Geometridae
- Cryphaea (plant), a genus of mosses in the family Cryphaeaceae
