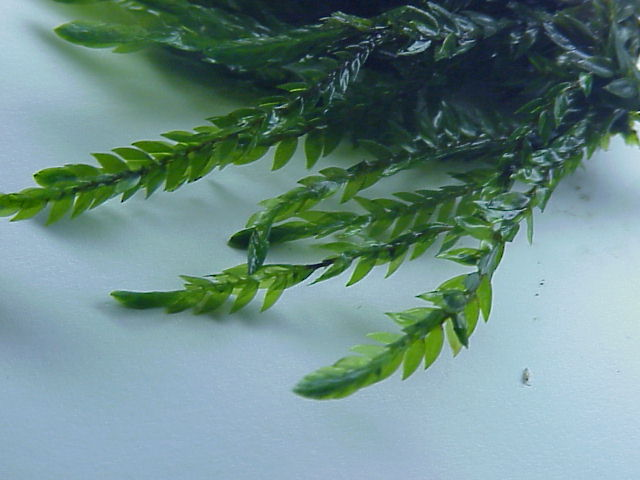
- Fontinalis antipyretica

Scientific classification
- Kingdom: Plantae
- Clade: Embryophytes
- Division: Bryophyta
- Class: Bryopsida
- Subclass: Bryidae
- Order: Hypnales
- Family: Fontinalaceae
- Genus: Fontinalis

= Fontinalis =

Genus of mosses

Fontinalis is a genus of submerged aquatic mosses belonging to the subclass Bryidae. These mosses are also called willow moss, fountain moss, brook moss and water moss. The genus is widespread in the Northern Hemisphere and includes both species that occur in still water and in flowing water.

== Biology ==
Fontinalis is characterized by its dark green color, and irregularly branching stems covered with small to large glossy, sharply ridged leaves. However, different species of it may be characterized by different traits—Fontinalis antipyretica has keeled leaves, while Fontinalis novae-angliae has small teeth towards the tip and rolled leaves. Other variations are seen in size and curvature of the branches.

Bruce Allen describes the genus's physical characteristics as such. "The axillary hairs are remarkably long, to over 900 μm. The leaves have a multistratose basal region that has been interpreted as a rudimentary costa. The perichaetial leaves are usually lacerated across their apices. There are sporophytic character-complexes within Fontinalis that show meaningful taxonomic patterns at the species level; however, since the genus is dioicous, sporophytes are rare. Aquatic adaptations of sporophyte-associated features in Fontinalis include: perigonia with few antheridia (1, 2, or 4–6); enlarged, well-developed vaginula; immersed or emergent, very thick-walled capsules; lack of stomata; and peristomes with endostomial trellises."

The species Fontinalis antipyretica is the first aquatic gametophyte plant to have its genome documented, as well as the first of the Fontinalis genus to be documented. It has 16,538 total genes with a genome that's 385.2 Mbp in size. It is monophyletic.

== Habitat ==
Fontinalis occurs primarily in clean, acidic freshwater across Afro-Eurasia, Iceland, and the Americas, attached to submerged rocks and logs. Some species of this genus can live in suboptimal conditions, like concrete ditches impacted by rocky substrata from run-offs. It generally prefers cool, darker environments – with temperature preferences varying between 10 and 15 °C depending on the species. However, higher temperatures don't necessarily kill them, as it generally only causes a temporary cessation to their growth.

== Ecology ==
This genus plays an important role in its ecosystem, often providing a habitat for stream invertebrates and even some fish eggs. The family of nematoceran flies, Chironomidae, is known to use these moss as a habitat, alongside other insects such as Pteronarcys, Hydropsychidae, Rhyacophila, Ephemerella, Leuctra, Nemouridae, and even Simulium in areas where the water is sufficiently fast. These moss also provide a home for algae and many microorganisms.

Fontinalis is also particularly sensitive to heavy metals, with water coming from copper pipes known to damage the genus over extended exposure. It is not known to be uniquely sensitive to cadmium, but it may be sensitive to other metals. However, this in turn can benefit the surrounding ecosystem, as these mosses are useful as heavy metal accumulators, making it useful in cleaning up surrounding ecosystems. Additionally, these plants do not release these metals when they die, adding to their usefulness.

== Life cycle ==
Fontinalis produces largely asexually, with new organisms coming from either old stems or rhizomes from the previous year. Young Fontinalis mosses emerge between late winter and early spring, going through intense growth spurts in the mid-summer. However, growth slows in late summer, and in autumn these mosses adopt an unhealthy appearance, turning olive green, then brown, then black during the winter. This is when new life begins to form, jumpstarting the lifecycle. They predominantly use stolons, plant fragments, and spores to reproduce. However, the species is capable of sexual reproduction, developing these organs in late summer and early autumn.

Janice M. Glime, a leading expert on the Fontinalis genus, speculates that "it is possible that these mosses, like many overwintering structures of higher plants, have experienced a required cold period (at 1 °C) and are preparing for a burst of activity similar to that exhibited by higher plants each spring."

== Aquarium uses ==
Fontinalis is notable for its usage in freshwater aquariums and garden ponds as a low-maintenance means of water oxygenation. The moss also can serve as a spawn receiver, especially for fish that breed towards the bottom of a tank such as Characidium fasciatum. Fontinalis antipyretica in particular is sought after for its willow-like appearance that can resemble Java moss.

== Species ==
List of all known species:

- Fontinalis antipyretica
- Fontinalis dalecarlica
- Fontinalis duriaei
- Fontinalis flaccida
- Fontinalis howellii
- Fontinalis hypnoides
- Fontinalis neomexicana
- Fontinalis novae-angliae
- Fontinalis sphagnifolia
- Fontinalis squamosa
- Fontinalis sullivantii
- Fontinalis redfearnii
- Fontinalis welchiana
