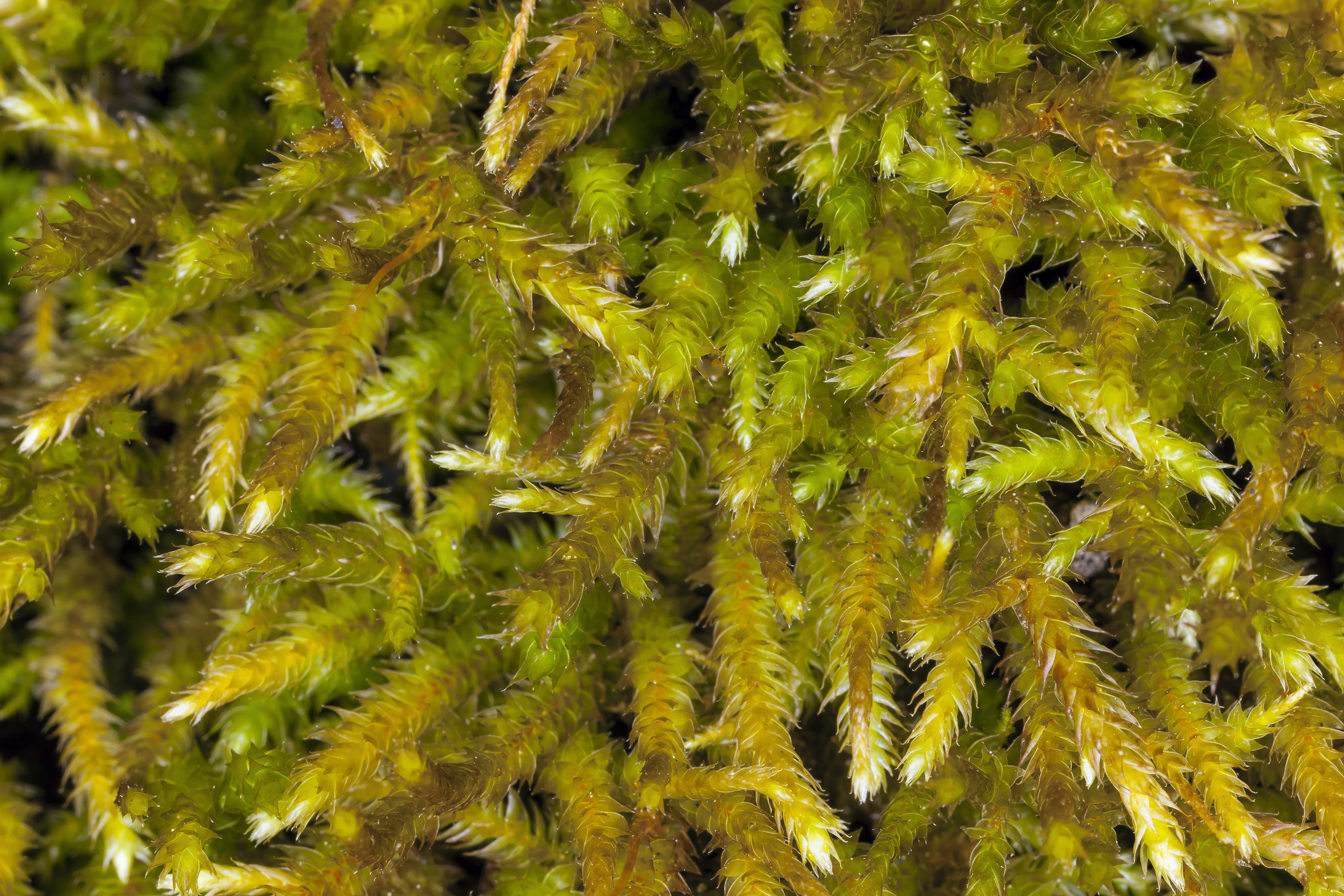
- Antitrichia californica

Scientific classification
- Kingdom: Plantae
- Division: Bryophyta
- Class: Bryopsida
- Subclass: Bryidae
- Order: Hypnales
- Family: Leucodontaceae
- Genus: Antitrichia; Brid.

= Antitrichia =

Genus of mosses

Antitrichia is a genus of mosses belonging to the family Leucodontaceae with a cosmopolitan distribution.

== Species ==
The following species are recognised in the genus Antitrichia:

- Antitrichia californica Sullivant
- Antitrichia curtipendula Bridel
- Antitrichia kilimandscharica Brotherus
- Antitrichia pseudocalifornia Kindb.
