= Pterogonium =

Scientific classification
- Kingdom: Plantae
- Division: Bryophyta
- Class: Bryopsida
- Subclass: Bryidae
- Order: Hypnales
- Family: Leucodontaceae
- Genus: Pterogonium; Sm.

Genus of mosses

Pterogonium is a genus of mosses belonging to the family Leucodontaceae.

The species of this genus are found in Eurasia, Africa and Northern America.

Species:

- Pterogonium ambiguum Hook.
- Pterogonium apiculatum (Brid.) Schwägr.
