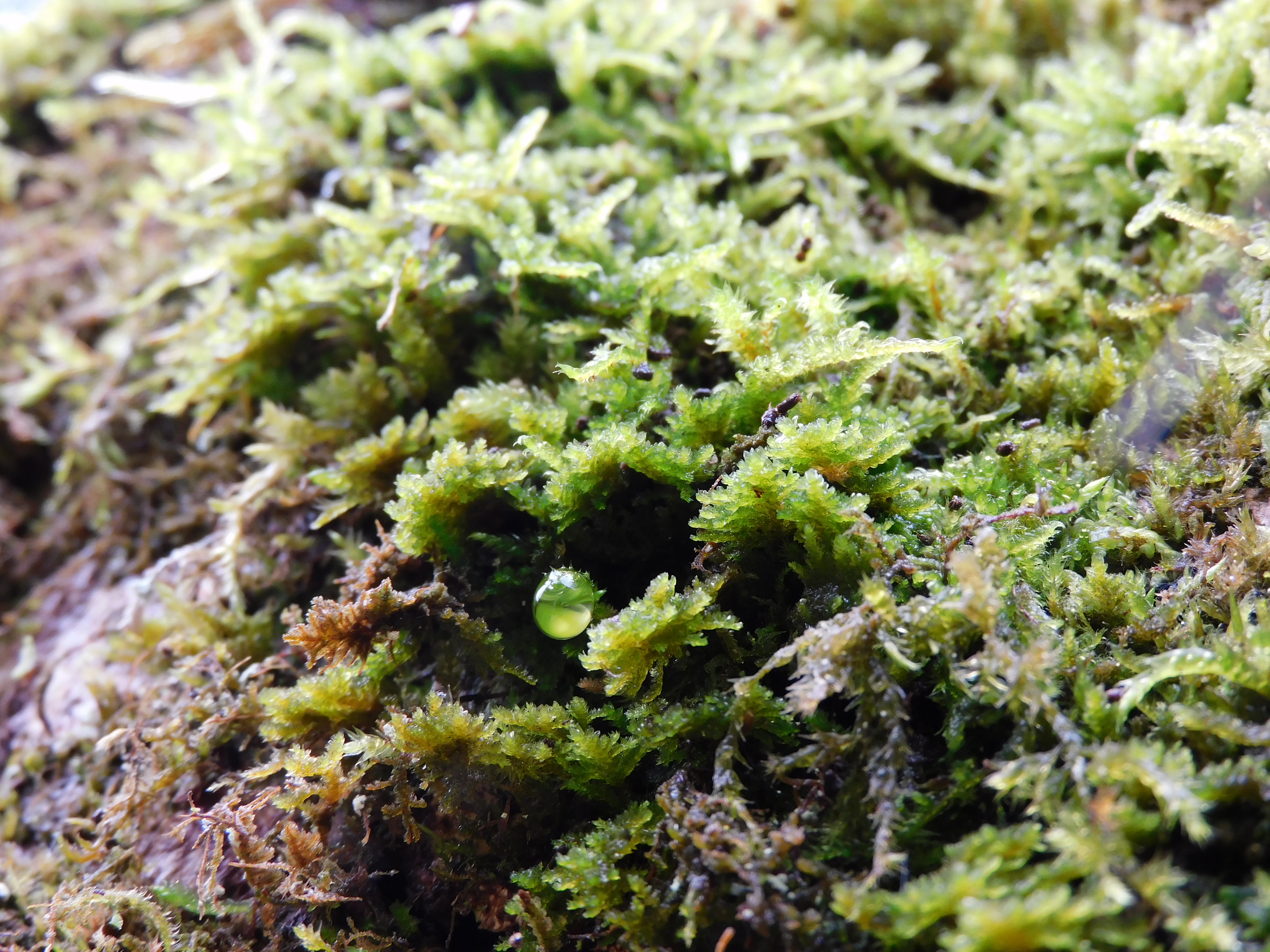
- Leptodon smithii

Scientific classification
- Kingdom: Plantae
- Clade: Embryophytes
- Division: Bryophyta
- Class: Bryopsida
- Subclass: Bryidae
- Order: Hypnales
- Family: Leptodontaceae; Schimper, W.Ph., 1856. Corollarium Bryologiae Europaeae 98.

= Leptodontaceae =

Family of plants

Leptodontaceae is a family of mosses belonging to the order Hypnales. There are 3 genera with a worldwide distribution.

Most of the genera of family Leptodontaceae, originally came from family Neckeraceae, Such as Caduciella came into Leptodontaceae in 1991.

It originally comprised Alsia, Forsstroemia, and Leptodon. Recently described or relocated genera in the family include Caduciella Enroth, Cryptoleptodon Renauld & Cardot, and Taiwanobryum Noguchi (J. Enroth 1992). Molecular evidence indicates that this small family may not be monophyletic.

Family Leucodontaceae now contains Forsstroemia and Alsia. Although some sources note that they are back within the Neckeraceae family. Later Cryptoleptodon moved into family Pterobryaceae, and Taiwanobryum moved into family Prionodontaceae.

== Description ==
The plants are medium sized, forming loose tufts, dark green to yellow green. Corticolous (growing on bark) or saxicolous (growing on rock). The secondary stems are erect, sometimes incurved when dry and generally pinnately branched. The branches are in single plane, they have pseudoparaphyllia (the trichome-like or foliose structures on moss stem surfaces).

They are defined by the combination of epiphytic habit, branching pattern of clusters of branches alternate with unbranched intervals bearing inflorescences, double sporophytic phenological cycle in which two cohorts of sporophytes mature simultaneously with embryos overwintering, subfoliose pseudoparaphyllia, cucullate calyptrae, sheathing post-fertilization perichaetial leaves (the leafy involucre surrounding the fruit stalk), central strands lacking in shoots, shortened setae (bristles), no annuli, and an exostome (the outer ring of peristome teeth) that flexes open when moist and flexes inward when dry (hydrocastique), thus serving to disperse spores during wet periods.

== Genera ==
As accepted by GBIF

- Caduciella Enroth (2)
- Leptodon D.Mohr (17)
- Pseudocryphaea E.G.Britton (1)

Figures in brackets are how many species per genus
