= Dayvon =

Dayvon is an English-language masculine given name, often found among African Americans. Notable people with the given name include:

- King Von (real name Dayvon Bennett; 1994–2020), American rapper

== See also ==
- Davon
- Devin
