= Dichelyma =

Scientific classification
- Kingdom: Plantae
- Division: Bryophyta
- Class: Bryopsida
- Subclass: Bryidae
- Order: Hypnales
- Family: Fontinalaceae
- Genus: Dichelyma; Myrin

Genus of mosses

Dichelyma is a genus of mosses belonging to the family Fontinalaceae.

The species of this genus are found in Eurasia and Northern America.

Species:

- Dichelyma brevinerve Kindb.
- Dichelyma capillaceum Myrin, 1833
