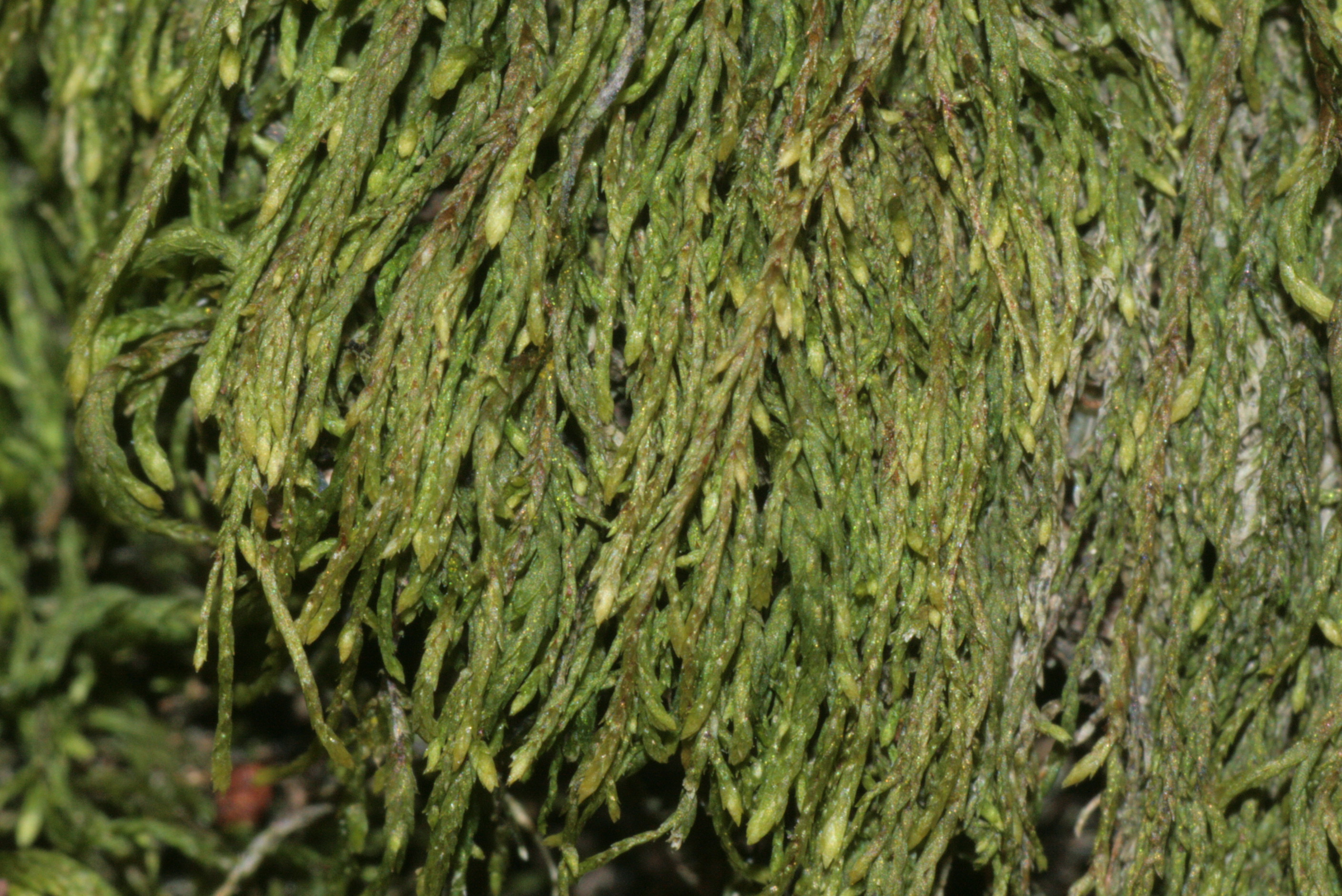

Scientific classification
- Kingdom: Plantae
- Division: Bryophyta
- Class: Bryopsida
- Subclass: Bryidae
- Order: Hypnales
- Family: Pterigynandraceae
- Genus: Pterigynandrum
- Species: P. filiforme

Binomial name
- Pterigynandrum filiforme Hedwig, 1801

= Pterigynandrum filiforme =

Species of moss

Pterigynandrum filiforme is a species of moss belonging to the family Pterigynandraceae.

It has cosmopolitan distribution.
