= Tree moss =

Tree moss is a common name for several organisms and may refer to:

- Climacium, a genus of mosses which resemble miniature trees
  - Climacium dendroides, a common species of Climacium
- Evernia, a genus of lichens which grow on trees
- Usnea, a genus of lichens which grow on trees
