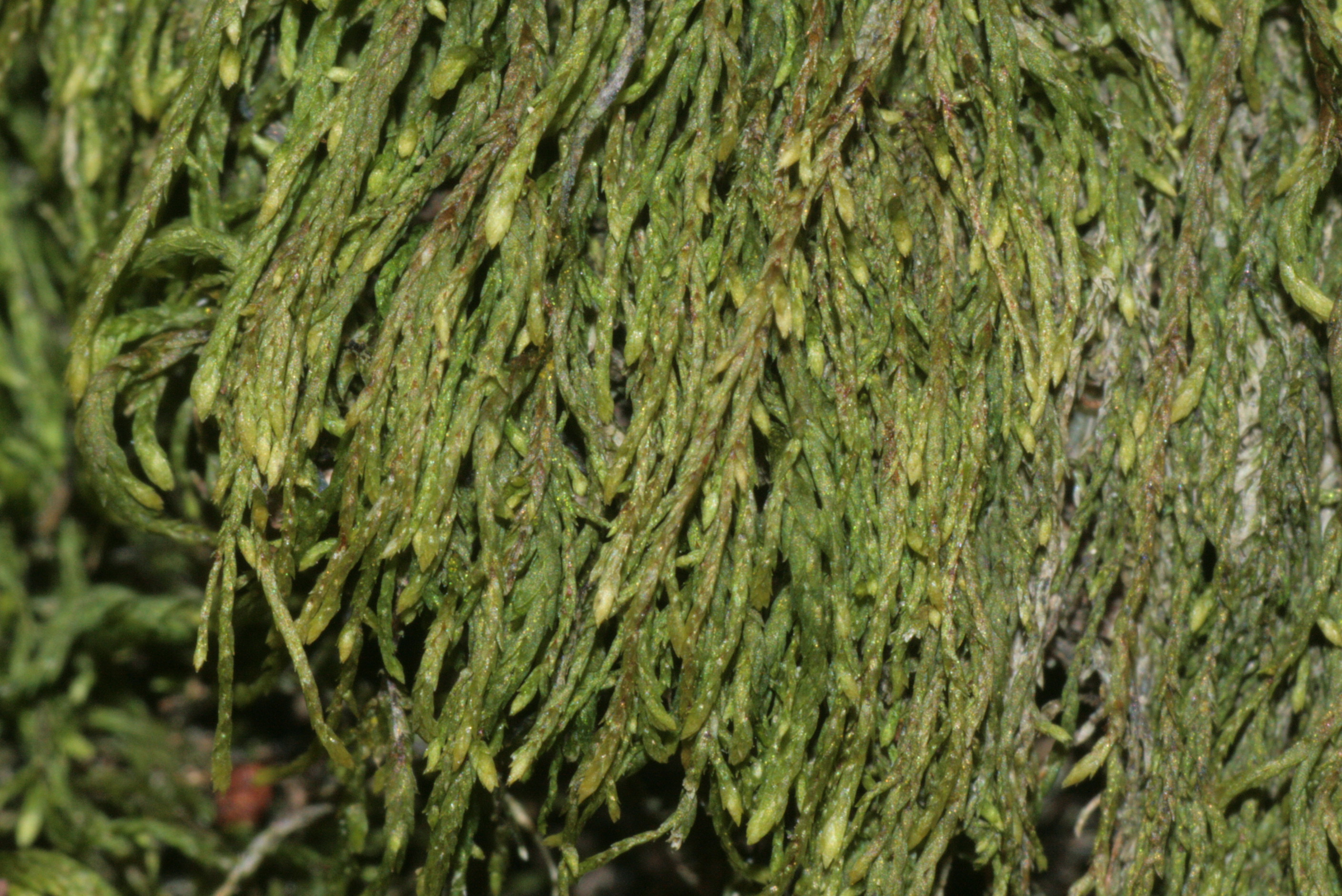
- Pterigynandrum filiforme

Scientific classification
- Kingdom: Plantae
- Division: Bryophyta
- Class: Bryopsida
- Subclass: Bryidae
- Order: Hypnales
- Family: Pterigynandraceae
- Genus: Pterigynandrum; Hedw.

= Pterigynandrum =

Genus of mosses

Pterigynandrum is a genus of mosses belonging to the family Pterigynandraceae.

The genus was first described by Johann Hedwig.

The genus has cosmopolitan distribution.

Species:

- Pterigynandrum filiforme Hedwig, 1801
