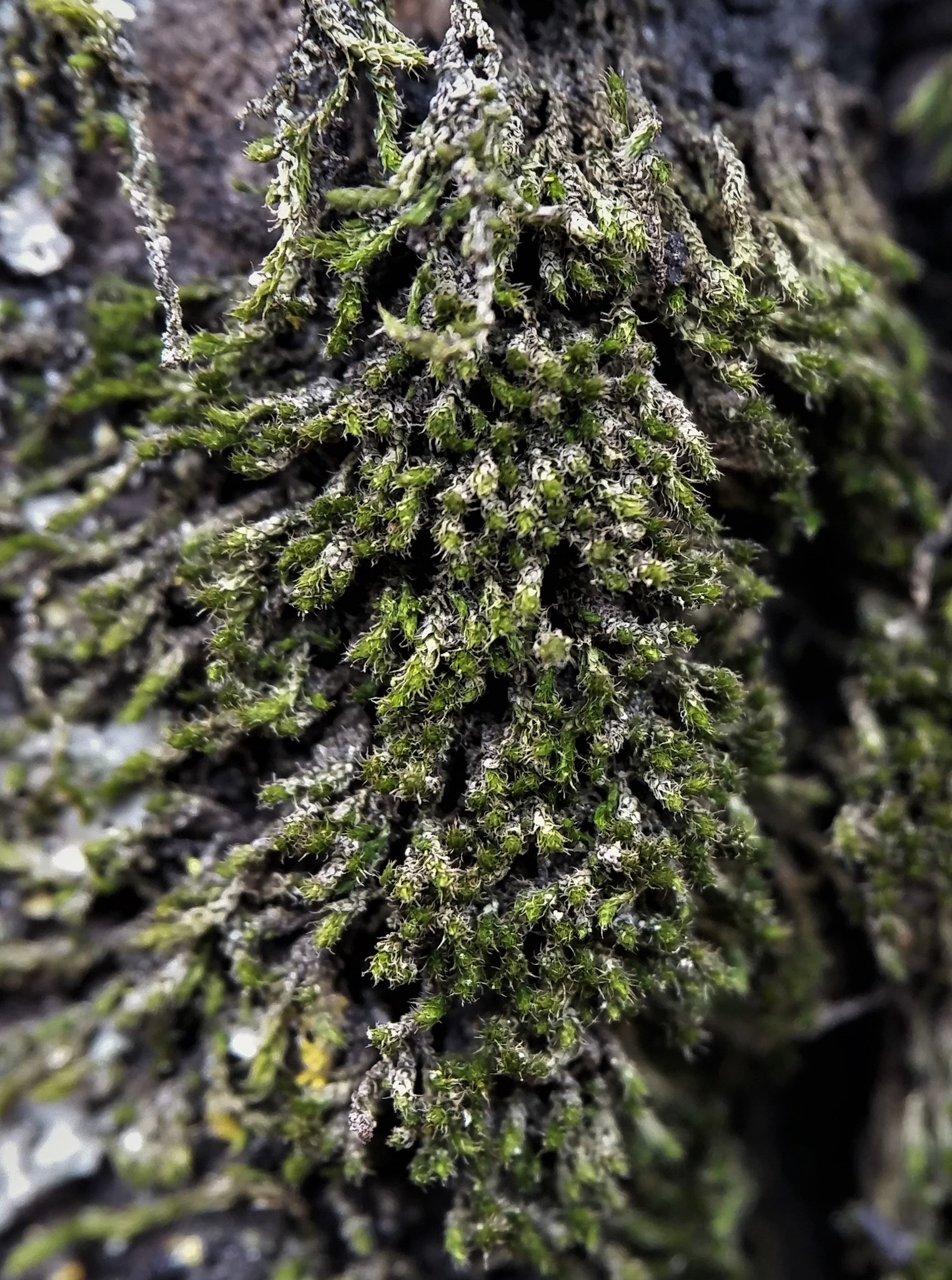
- Fabronia ciliaris

Scientific classification
- Kingdom: Plantae
- Division: Bryophyta
- Class: Bryopsida
- Subclass: Bryidae
- Order: Hypnales
- Family: Fabroniaceae; Schimper, W.Ph., 1856. Corollarium Bryologiae Europaeae 102.

= Fabroniaceae =

Family of plants

Fabroniaceae is a family of mosses belonging to the order Hypnales. It has a worldwide distribution, in temperate and tropical regions.

The Fabroniaceae were established by Schimper (in 1855) to accommodate three genera: Fabronia Raddi, Anacamptodon Brid. and Anisodon Schimp.(= Clasmatodon Hook. & Wilson). Only Fabronia is still considered a member of the family (Buck & Goffinet 2000; Goffinet & Buck 2004; Goffinet et al.2009). The Fabroniaceae are well represented in the tropics with few species occurring in the North Temperate Zone.

== Description ==
They are tropical mosses that grow on tree trunks and have erect branches and exserted capsules with the operculum (a cap-like structure) beaked. The gametophyte, is pleurocarpous (side-fruited), forming patches, or growing through other Bryophytes. It has primary stems that are procumbent (and homomallous or uniformly bending). The leaves of main stems and branches are similar in form. The leaves are nerveless, or single-nerved. The leaf blade margins are flat; unistratose (single layer of cells) and finely crenulate or entire. The walls of basal leaf cells are thick and straight. They are dioecious.

== Taxonomy ==
The following genera are recognised in the family Fabroniaceae. Figures in brackets represent the number of species per genus:

- Dimerodontium Mitt. (3)
- Fabronia Raddi (62)
- Ischyrodon Müll.Hal. (1)
- Levierella Müll.Hal. (2)

In a 2012 phylogenetic study, Câmara and Buck stated that the genus Levierella should be nested within the family Entodontaceae, with Dimerodontium among taxa traditionally associated with the family Leskeaceae.
