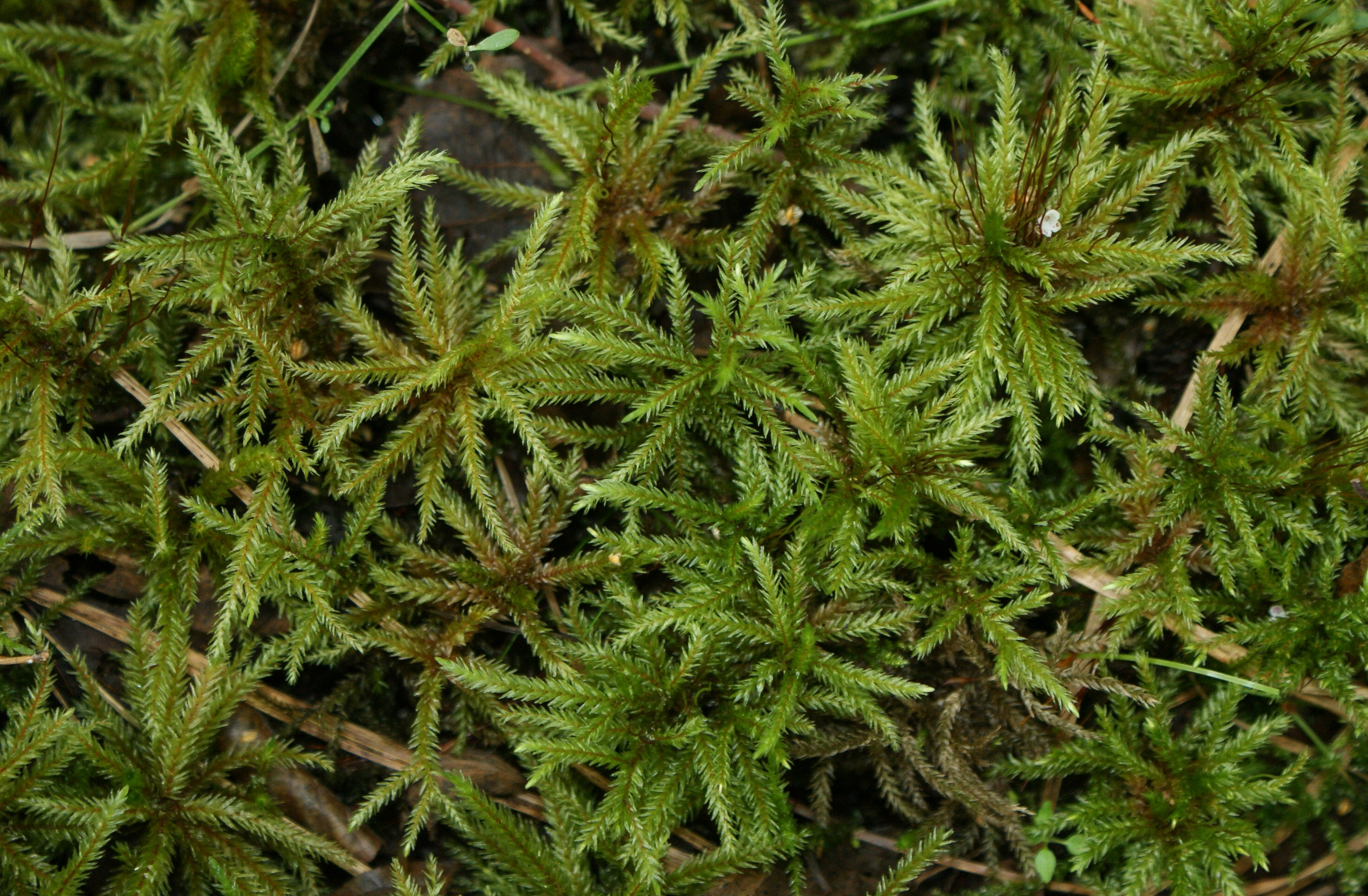
- Climacium dendroides

Scientific classification
- Kingdom: Plantae
- Division: Bryophyta
- Class: Bryopsida
- Subclass: Bryidae
- Order: Hypnales
- Family: Climaciaceae
- Genus: Climacium; F.Weber & D.Mohr

= Climacium =

Genus of mosses

Climacium is a genus of mosses belonging to the family Climaciaceae. The species of this genus are found in Eurasia, North America, and Australia.

== Species ==
The following species are recognised in the genus Climacium:

- Climacium acuminatum Warnst.
- Climacium americanum Brid.
- Climacium dendroides Weber & D.Mohr, 1804
- Climacium japonicum Lindb.
