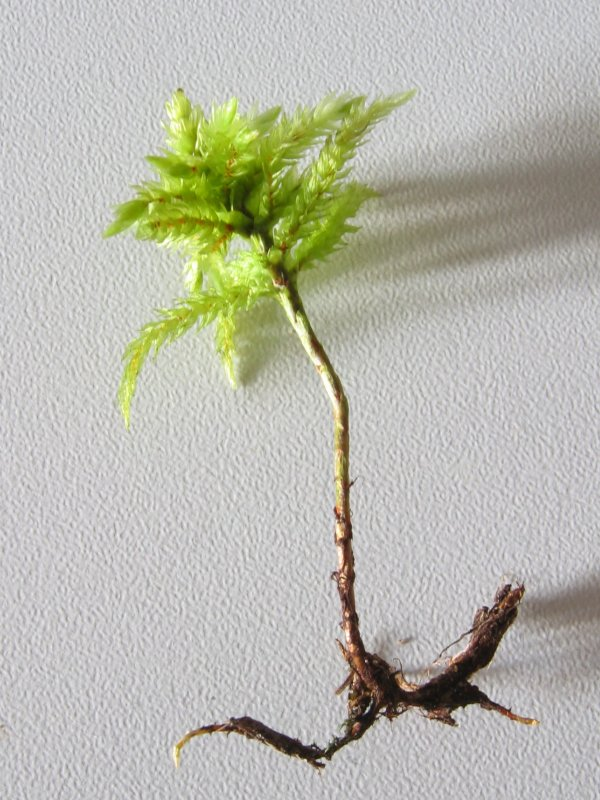

Scientific classification
- Kingdom: Plantae
- Division: Bryophyta
- Class: Bryopsida
- Subclass: Bryidae
- Order: Hypnales
- Family: Climaciaceae
- Genus: Climacium
- Species: C. dendroides

Binomial name
- Climacium dendroides (Hedw.) F. Weber & D. Mohr

= Climacium dendroides =

Species of moss

Climacium dendroides, also known as tree climacium moss, belongs in the order Hypnales and family Climaciaceae, in class Bryopsida and subclass Bryidae. It is identified as a "tree moss" due to its distinctive morphological features, and has four species identified across the Northern Hemisphere. The species name "dendroides" describes the tree-like morphology of the plant, and its genus name came from the structure of the perforations of peristome teeth. This plant was identified by Weber and Mohr in 1804. They often have stems that are around 2-10 cm tall and growing in the form of patches, looking like small palm-trees. They have yellow-green branches at the tip of stems. The leaves are around 2.5-3 mm long, with rounder stem leaves and pointier branch leaves. Their sporophytes are only abundant in late winter and early spring, and appears as a red-brown shoot with long stalk and cylindrical capsules.

== Habitat and range ==
This species mostly dominate in moist and damp regions such as swamps, peatland and lake edges, as well as humus-rich woods, areas where water fluctuates periodically. They can be terrestrial or dominating woods and logs, they rarely grow on rocks and regions that lack moisture. They are often found in sea-level to subalpine elevations and in alpine tundras. This species is relatively widespread but not common, they are found in northern to central Europe and Asia, the South Island of New Zealand, and North America. In North America, it can be found in the Northeastern region above 45°N, and as south as the Western regions of New Mexico. They can also be found in some regions in Asia, like Japan and Korea.

== Description ==
The colour of this plant is dark green to yellow, and they can be glossy as well when they are dry. They also have separate stem and branch leaves with different structure. The stem leaves appears to have an obtuse apex, flatter against the stem and broader then the branch leaves. They are not pleated and near insertion area they contain multiple laminal cells. Their insertions are well-spaced and all have round tips. For the branch leaves, they are narrower and has a toothed margin near the tip with longitudinal folds. They have a similar shape with the stem leaves, both are egg-shaped but branch leaves are narrower. They have elongated leaf cells, and around the basal angles the stem and branch leaves contain enlarge hyaline cells with thin walls. The leaves are around 2.5-3 mm long in size. The arrangement of leaves gives the plant a palm tree-like appearance, with 2-3 cm tall stems arising from prostrate primary stems that looks like rhizomes. The attachment region of branch leaves to stem appears flat and continuous with the leaf outline, it is round to cordate and auriculate from the flexion of the margins. The stems are reddish-brown and can be short in dry areas, they appear tree-like in areas with plenty of moisture. The upright stems contains small green filaments, and the branched horizontal stems is where the tree-like structure (2-10cm) grows out from. Their capsules are upright and oblong-cylindric, ranging from 1.5-4 mm, they are quite rare to encounter since male plants are more rare than female ones.

== Life cycle ==
In contrast with vascular plants that only has two sets of chromosomes (diploid), bryophytes are known to have a haploid generation with a single set of chromosomes, this happens in the sporophyte stage of their life cycle.

The life-cycle starts with a haploid spore that germinates to produce a protonema, which are thread-like filaments or thalloid. Protonema is a combination of chloronema, caulonema and rhizoids. Chloronema are usually first formed, they are irregularly branched, has transverse crosswalls that are not pigmented, and round chloroplasts with no buds forming yet. Later on, the caulonema forms that are regularly branched, has pigmented and oblique crosswalls, spindle-shaped chloroplasts and has buds forming. Rhizoids are also present here, it helps the gametophyte that forms later on to attach to its substrate. The protonema then produces the gametophore that is structurally differentiated into stems and leaves, one or more gametophores can be formed from a single protonema. The gametophyte is formed from the caulonema buds and they undergo mitosis to produce haploid sex gametes (sperm and eggs).

The gametophores also produce specialized sexual structures that houses the sperm and eggs on separate gametophytes (since Climacium dendroides are dioecious). The female structure produced is called the archegonia and are surrounded by a group of modified leaves known as the perichaetium. The archegonia are small flask-shaped structure with a neck-like structure called the venter down which the male sperm swim to the enclosed female eggs. This is also where fertilization occurs. The male structures are known as antheridia and are protected by modified leaves called the perigonium.

Fertilization will occur with the aid of water, sperm will be transported from antheridia to archegonia and travel down its venter to reach the egg, where fertilization will happen. Producing a diploid sporophyte. The sperm is biflagellate, they have two flagellae that aid in propulsion. The immature sporophyte then grows out from the archegonial venter. A sporophyte contains a seta (that holds up the sporangium), a capsule with an operculum cap, and a coat enclosing the capsule called the calyptra that grew from the venter of archegonia and is the only haploid structure in sporophyte. When the sporophyte is fully mature the calyptra falls off and reveals the peristome teeth within. Meiosis occurs in the sporangium and haploid spores are produced and released through the control of peristome teeth. The spores are usually carried by the wind to their new substrate where the life cycle repeats again.

== Reproduction ==
Sporophytes are not often found except during late winter and early spring near areas with plenty of moisture. The short cylindric capsules of this species often mature in the fall. This species is known to have a dioecious gametophore (having male and female gametophores on different plants. They have a long seta with sporangium at the terminal end. The spores are released when the operculum dehisces and can be aided via hygroscopic dehiscence. They also contain peristome teeth that controls the release of the spores. The spores are unicellular.

== In culture ==
Climacium dendroides was named Moss of the Year in 2017 by the Latvian Botanists' Association.

== Similar species ==
- Leucolepis acanthoneuron also has a miniature tree-like structure but does not arise from a creeping shoot. They have whitish and narrowly triangular stem leaves whereas for Climacium they have green and heart-shaped stem leaves. For Leucolepis their sporophytes are frequent in spring and has a nodding sporangia, compared to erect sporangia for Climacium.
