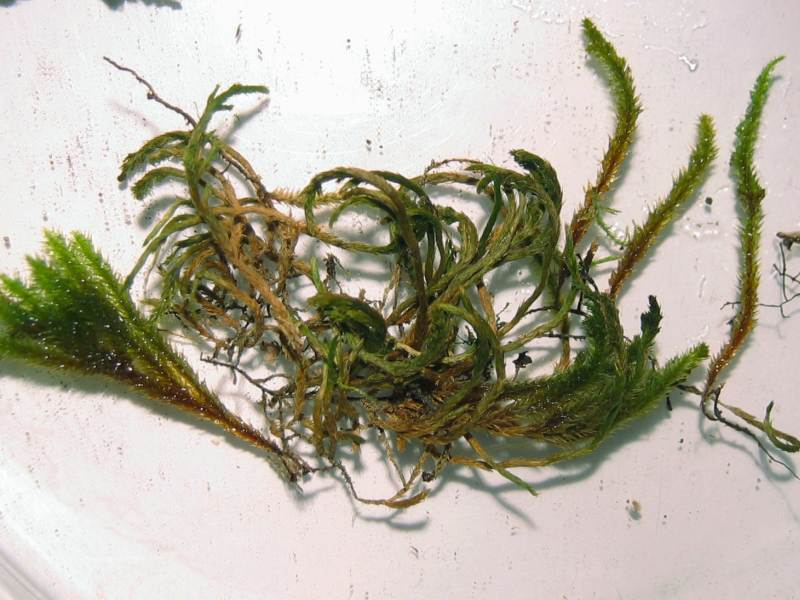
- Leucodon sciuroides

Scientific classification
- Kingdom: Plantae
- Division: Bryophyta
- Class: Bryopsida
- Subclass: Bryidae
- Order: Hypnales
- Family: Leucodontaceae; Schimp.

= Leucodontaceae =

Family of mosses

Leucodontaceae is a family of mosses belonging to the order Hypnales.

== Genera ==
Genera:

- Dozya Sande Lac.
- Eoleucodon H.A.Mill. & H.Whittier
- Leucodon Schwägr.
- Pterogoniadelphus M.Fleisch.
- Scabridens E.B.Bartram

=== Formerly included ===
- Antitrichia Brid. – now in Antitrichiaceae
- Dendroalsia E.Britton ex Broth. – now in Cryphaeaceae
- Dusenia Broth. – synonym of Forsstroemia
- Felipponea Broth. – synonym of Pterogoniadelphus
- Nogopterium Crosby & W.R.Buck – now in Lembophyllaceae
- Pterogonium Sw. – synonym of Pterigynandrum
