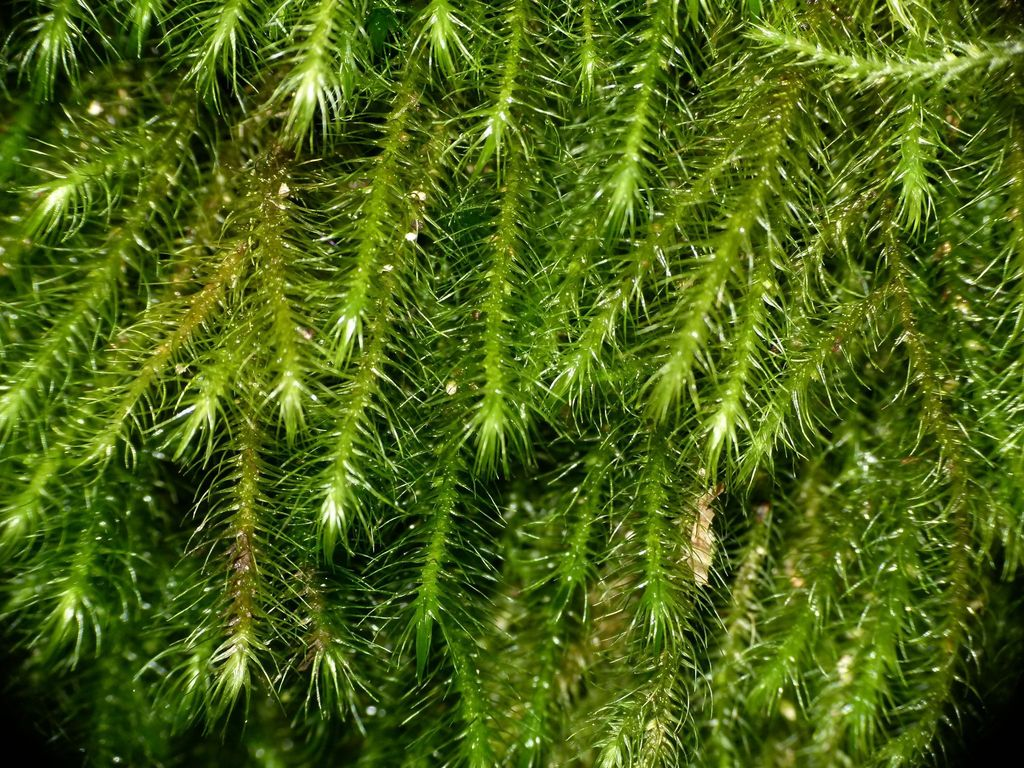

Scientific classification
- Kingdom: Plantae
- Clade: Embryophytes
- Division: Bryophyta
- Class: Bryopsida
- Subclass: Bryidae
- Order: Hypnales
- Family: Echinodiaceae; Broth.

Genera
- See genus

= Echinodiaceae =

Family of mosses

Echinodiaceae is a monogeneric family of moss from the order Hypnobryales. It is found worldwide (especially the Americas and Oceania).

== Classification ==
It has only 1 genus:

Echinodium Jur.
