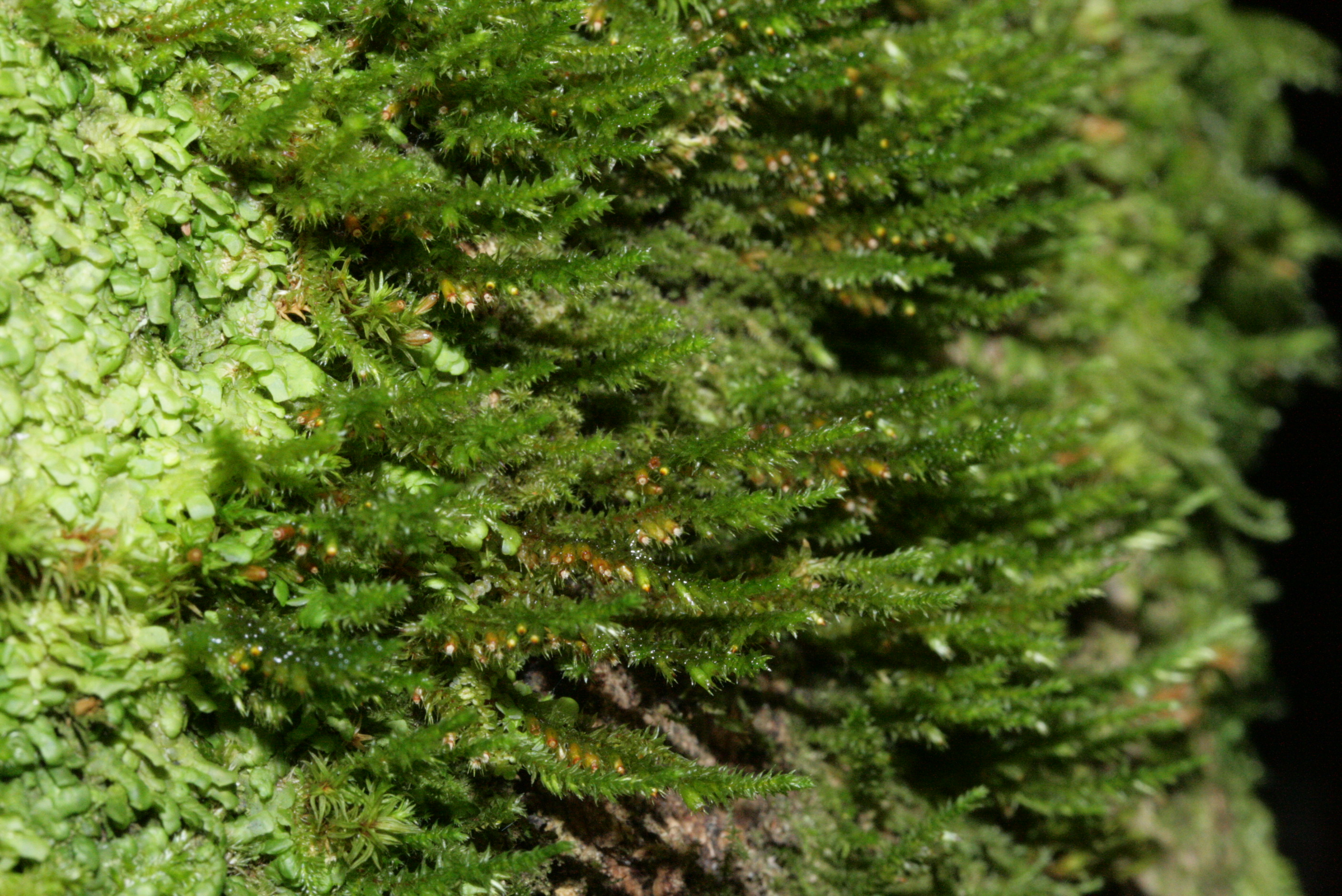
- Cryphaea heteromalla

Scientific classification
- Kingdom: Plantae
- Division: Bryophyta
- Class: Bryopsida
- Subclass: Bryidae
- Order: Hypnales
- Family: Cryphaeaceae
- Genus: Cryphaea; D.Mohr

= Cryphaea (plant) =

Genus of moss

Cryphaea is a genus of mosses, (Bryophyta), containing at least 26 accepted species.

== Species ==
There have been 165 plant names of the rank of species that have been used for the genus Cryphaea, although only 26 are now accepted species names within modern nomenclature.

- Cryphaea acuminata Hook. f. & Wilson
- Cryphaea apiculata Schimp.
- Cryphaea evanescens Müll. Hal.
- Cryphaea exigua (Müll. Hal.) A. Jaeger
- Cryphaea filiformis (Hedw.) Brid.
- Cryphaea glomerata Schimp. ex Sull.
- Cryphaea heteromalla (Hedw.) D. Mohr
- Cryphaea hygrophila Müll. Hal.
- Cryphaea jamesonii Taylor
- Cryphaea lamyana (Mont.) Müll. Hal. (Multi-fruited river moss/multi-fruited cryphaea)
- Cryphaea leucocolea (Mitt.) H. Rob.
- Cryphaea nitens (Müll. Hal.) Schimp. ex Paris
- Cryphaea orizabae Schimp.
- Cryphaea ovalifolia (Müll. Hal.) A. Jaeger
- Cryphaea patens Hornsch. ex Müll. Hal.
- Cryphaea pilifera Mitt.
- Cryphaea protensa Bruch & Schimp. ex Müll. Hal.
- Cryphaea raddiana (Brid.) Hampe
- Cryphaea ragazzii (Brizi) Broth.
- Cryphaea rhacomitrioides Müll. Hal.
- Cryphaea rutenbergii Müll. Hal.
- Cryphaea schiedeana (Müll. Hal.) Mitt.
- Cryphaea songpanensis Enroth & T.J. Kop.
- Cryphaea tasmanica Mitt.
- Cryphaea tenella (Schwägr.) Hornsch. ex Müll. Hal.
