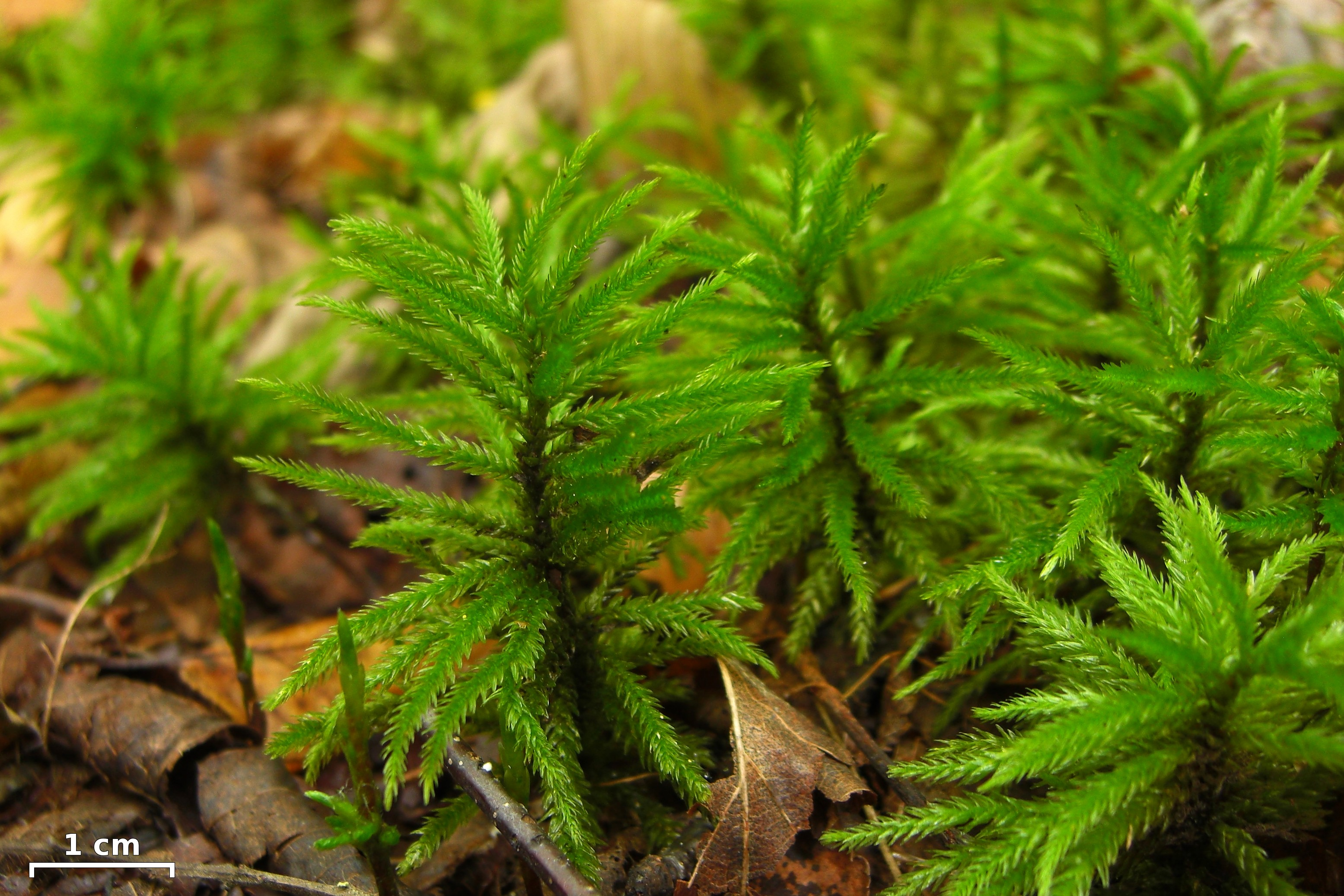
- Climacium dendroides

Scientific classification
- Kingdom: Plantae
- Division: Bryophyta
- Class: Bryopsida
- Subclass: Bryidae
- Order: Hypnales
- Family: Climaciaceae; Kindb.

= Climaciaceae =

Family of mosses

Climaciaceae is a family of mosses belonging to the order Hypnales.

Genera:

- Climacium F. Weber & D.M.H. Mohr in D.M.H. Mohr, 1803
- Pterobryon Hornschuch in C.F.P. Martius, 1840
- Girgensohnia (S.O. Lindberg) Kindberg, 1896
