= Davon =

Davon is a given name. Notable people with the name include:

- Davon Booth (born 2002), American football player
- Davon Coleman (born 1991), American football player
- Davon Drew (born 1985), American football tight end who is currently a free agent
- Davon Godchaux (born 1994), American football player
- DaVon Hamilton (born 1997), American football player
- Davon House (born 1989), American football cornerback for the Green Bay Packers
- Davon Jefferson (born 1986), American professional basketball player in the Israeli Basketball Premier League
- Davon Raubenheimer (born 1984), professional rugby union rugby player
- Davon Williams (born 1972), former West Indian cricketer

== See also ==
- Auf und davon – Mein Auslandstagebuch, German documentary television series, broadcast on VOX since 16 April 2007
- Mehr davon (More of it) is a song by Die Toten Hosen
- Mehr davon! Die Single-Box (More of it!) is a single box by the German punk band Die Toten Hosen
- Mehr davon! Die Single-Box 1995–2000 (More of it!) is a single box by the German punk band Die Toten Hosen
- Davron
- Dolavon
- Donavon (disambiguation)
