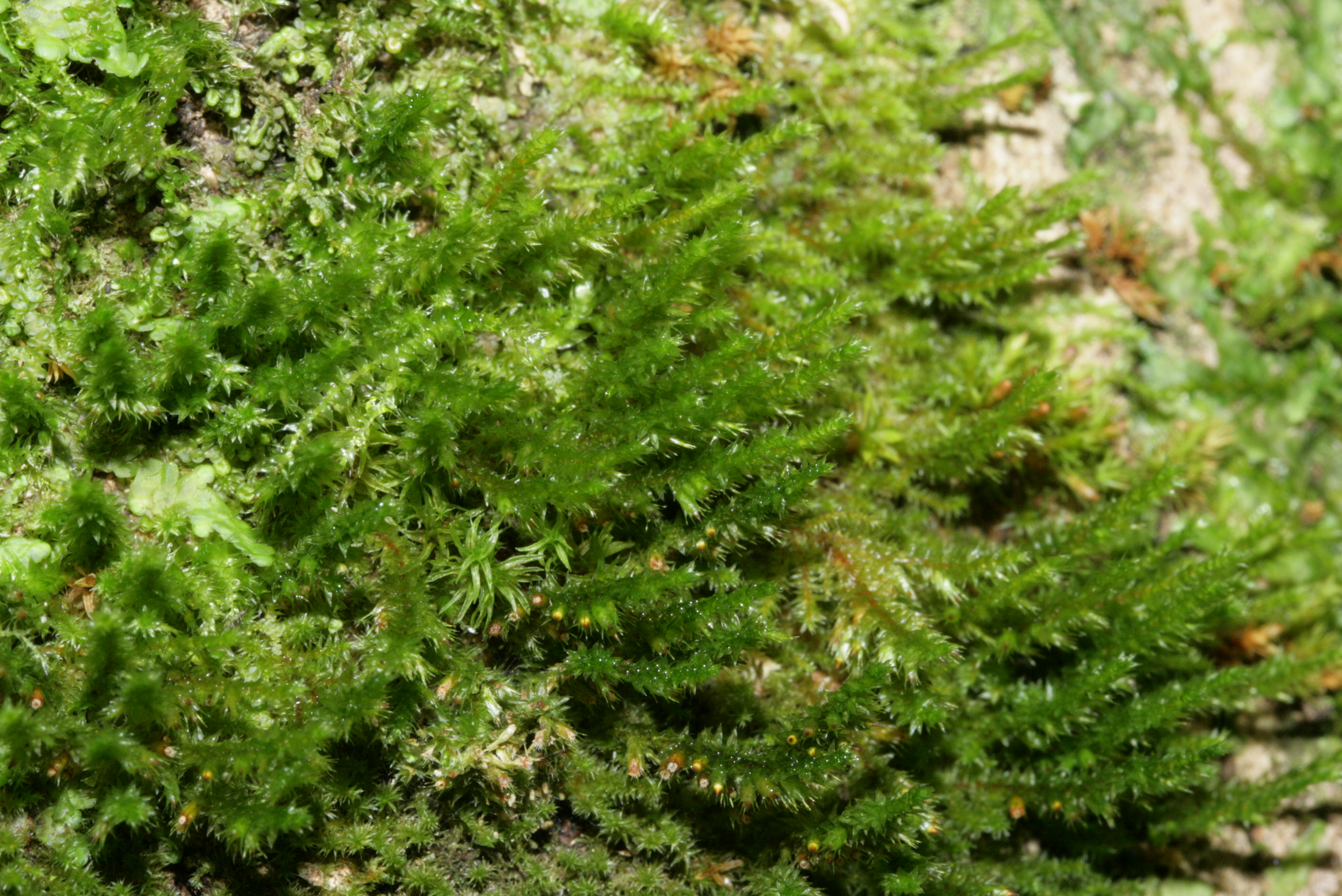
- Cryphaea heteromalla

Scientific classification
- Kingdom: Plantae
- Division: Bryophyta
- Class: Bryopsida
- Subclass: Bryidae
- Order: Hypnales
- Family: Cryphaeaceae; Schimp.

= Cryphaeaceae =

Family of mosses

Cryphaeaceae is a family of mosses (Bryophyta).

== Genera ==
Tha family Cryphaeaceae contains the following genera:

- Cryphaea D. Mohr
- Cryphaeophilum M. Fleisch.
- Cryphidium (Mitt.) A. Jaeger
- Cyptodon (Broth.) M. Fleisch.
- Cyptodontopsis Dixon
- Dendroalsia E. Britton
- Dendrocryphaea Broth.
- Dendropogonella E. Britton
- Pilotrichopsis Besch.
- Schoenobryum Dozy & Molk.
- Sphaerotheciella M. Fleisch.
