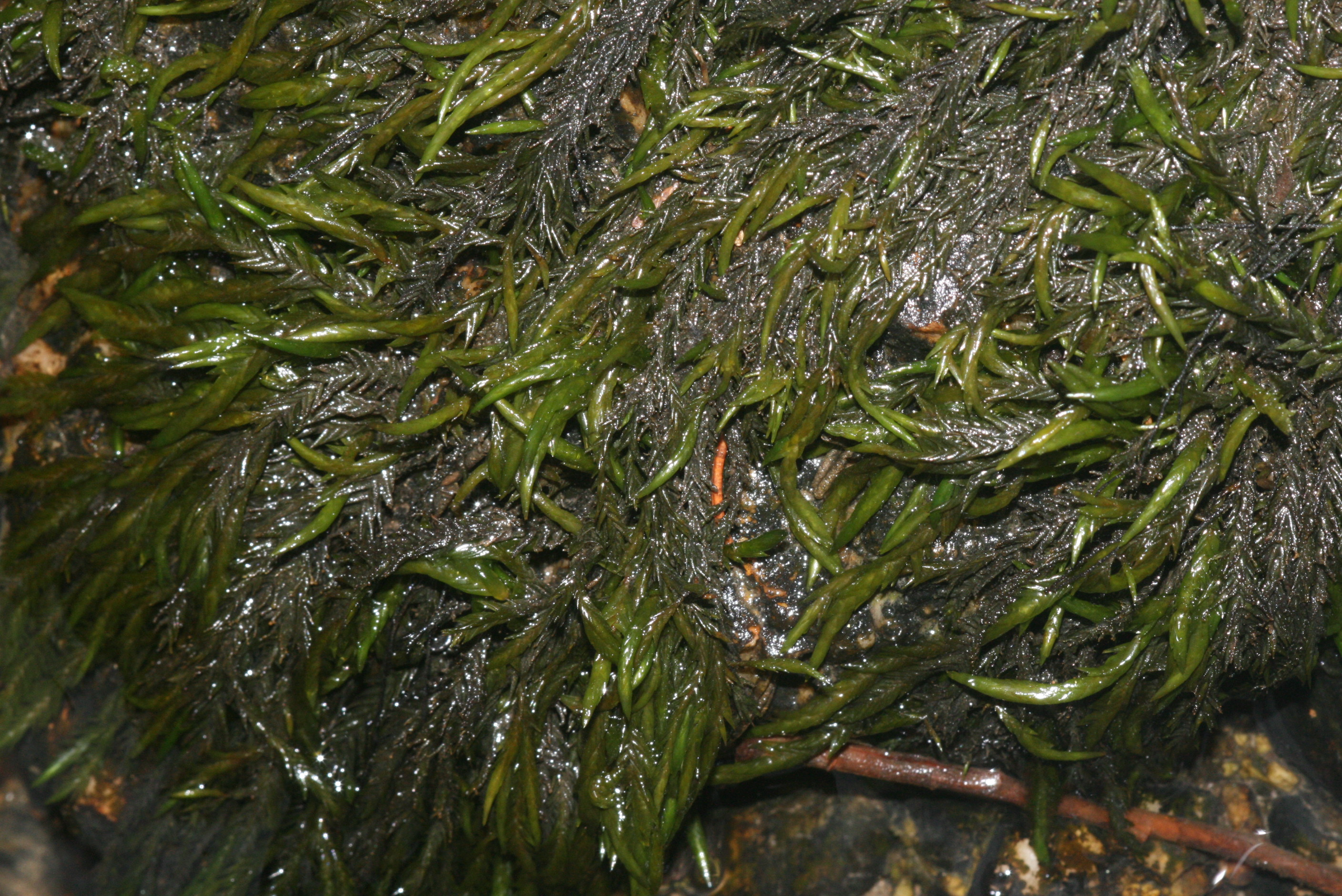
- Fontinalis squamosa

Scientific classification
- Kingdom: Plantae
- Division: Bryophyta
- Class: Bryopsida
- Subclass: Bryidae
- Order: Hypnales
- Family: Fontinalaceae; Schimp.

= Fontinalaceae =

Family of mosses

Fontinalaceae is a family of mosses belonging to the order Hypnales.

Genera:

- Brachelyma Schimp. ex Cardot (1)
- Cryphaeadelphus (Müller Hal.) J.Cardot, 1904
- Dichelyma Myrin (10)
- Fontinalis Hedw. (76)

Figures in brackets are approx. how many species per genus.
