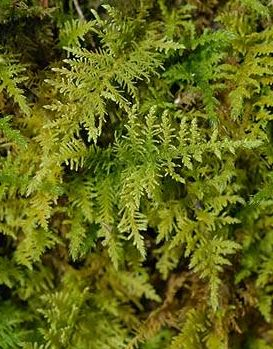
- Thuidium tamariscinum

Scientific classification
- Kingdom: Plantae
- Division: Bryophyta
- Class: Bryopsida
- Subclass: Bryidae
- Superorder: Hypnanae
- Order: Hypnales; W.R. Buck & Vitt

Families
- See text.

Synonyms
- Hypnineae M.Fleisch.; Hypnobryales M.Fleisch.; Isobryales M.Fleisch.; Leucodontales W.R.Buck & Vitt

= Hypnales =

Order of mosses

Hypnales, synonyms including Isobryales, is an order of Bryophyta or leafy mosses. This group is sometimes called feather mosses, referring to their freely branched stems. The order includes more than 40 families and more than 4,000 species, making them the largest order of mosses.

== Description ==
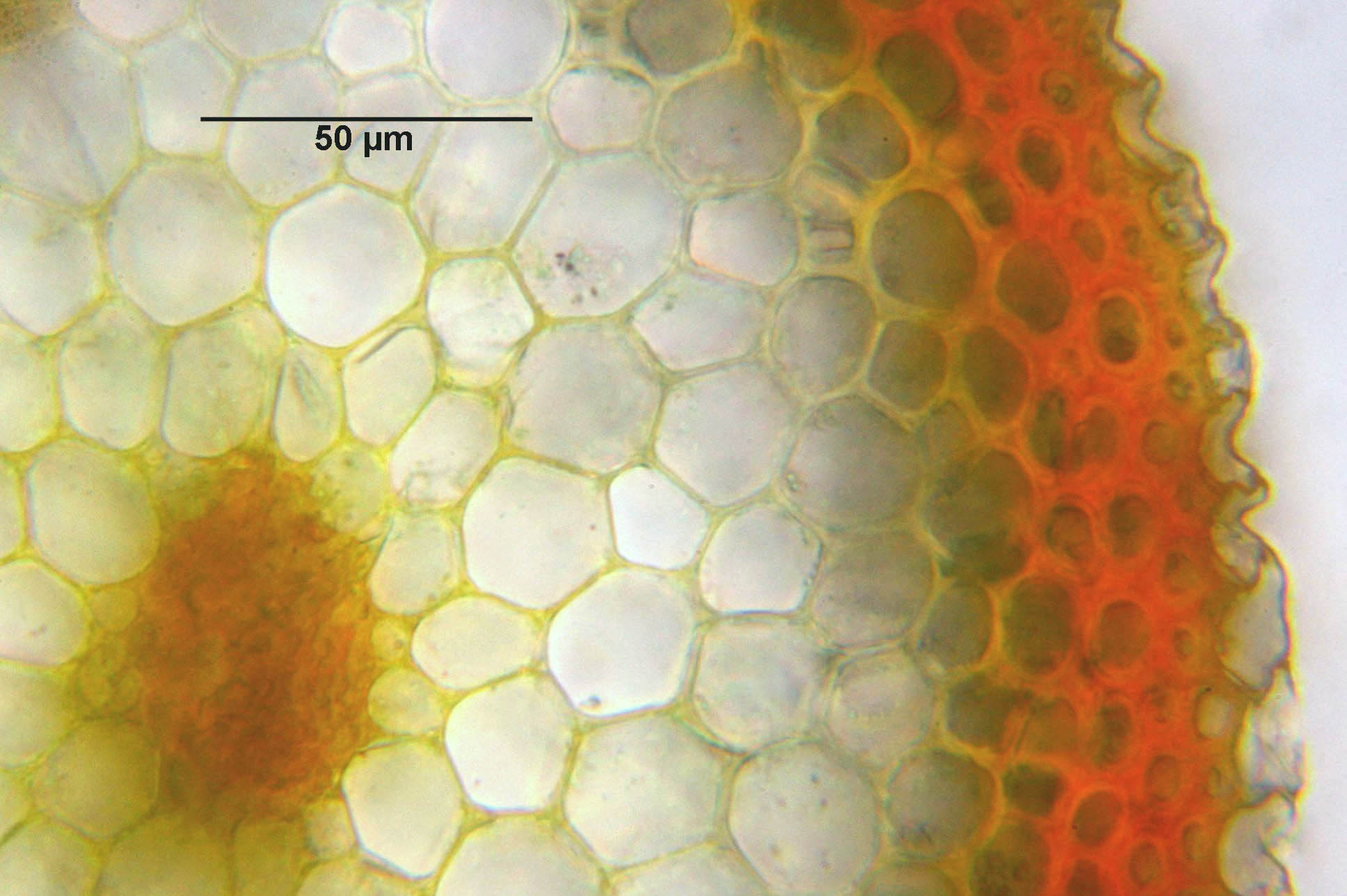
Hypnum lindbergii, cross section of the stem with the central vascular bundle

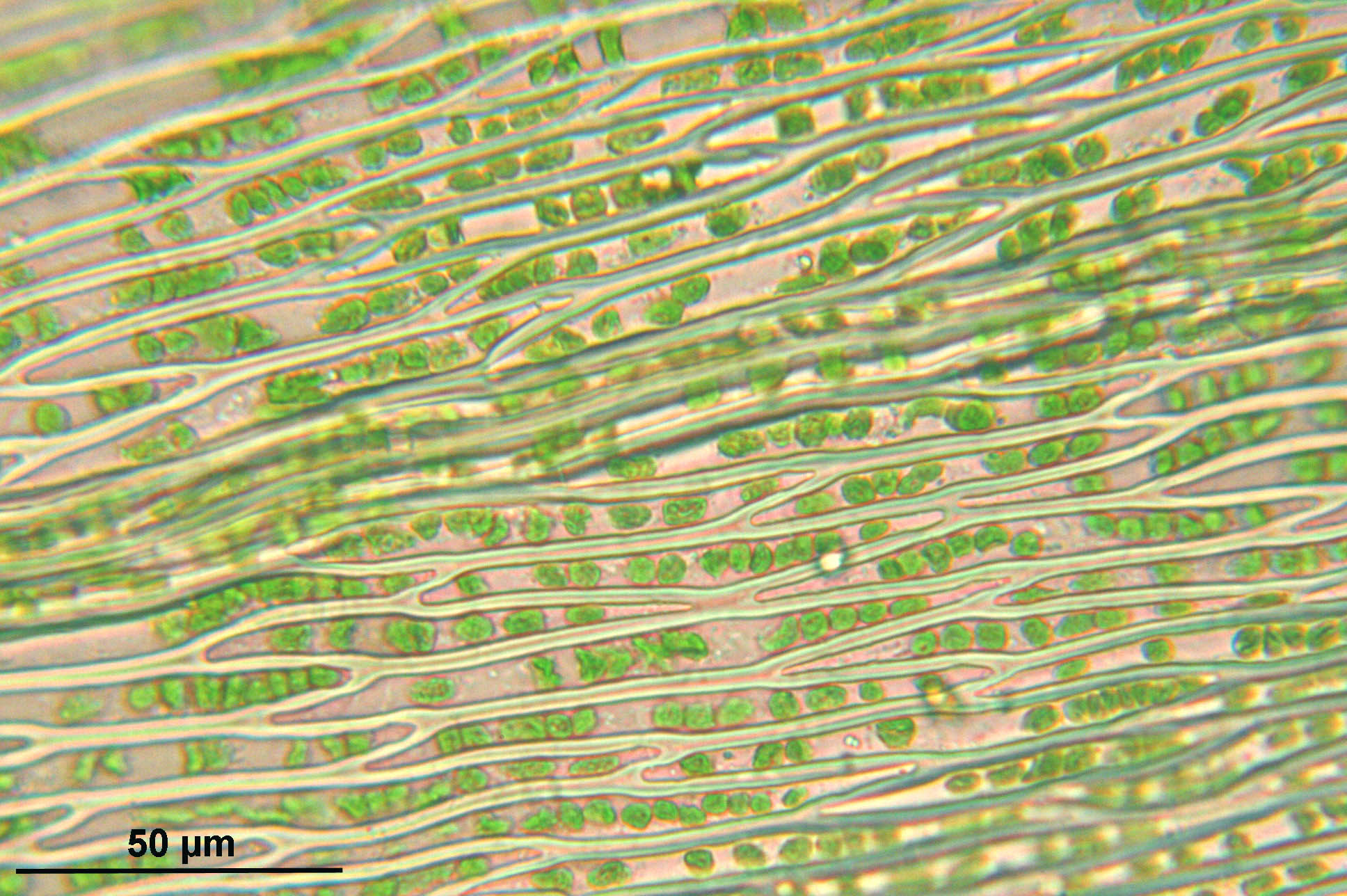
River feather-moss, Brachythecium rivulare, prosenchymatic leaf blade cells

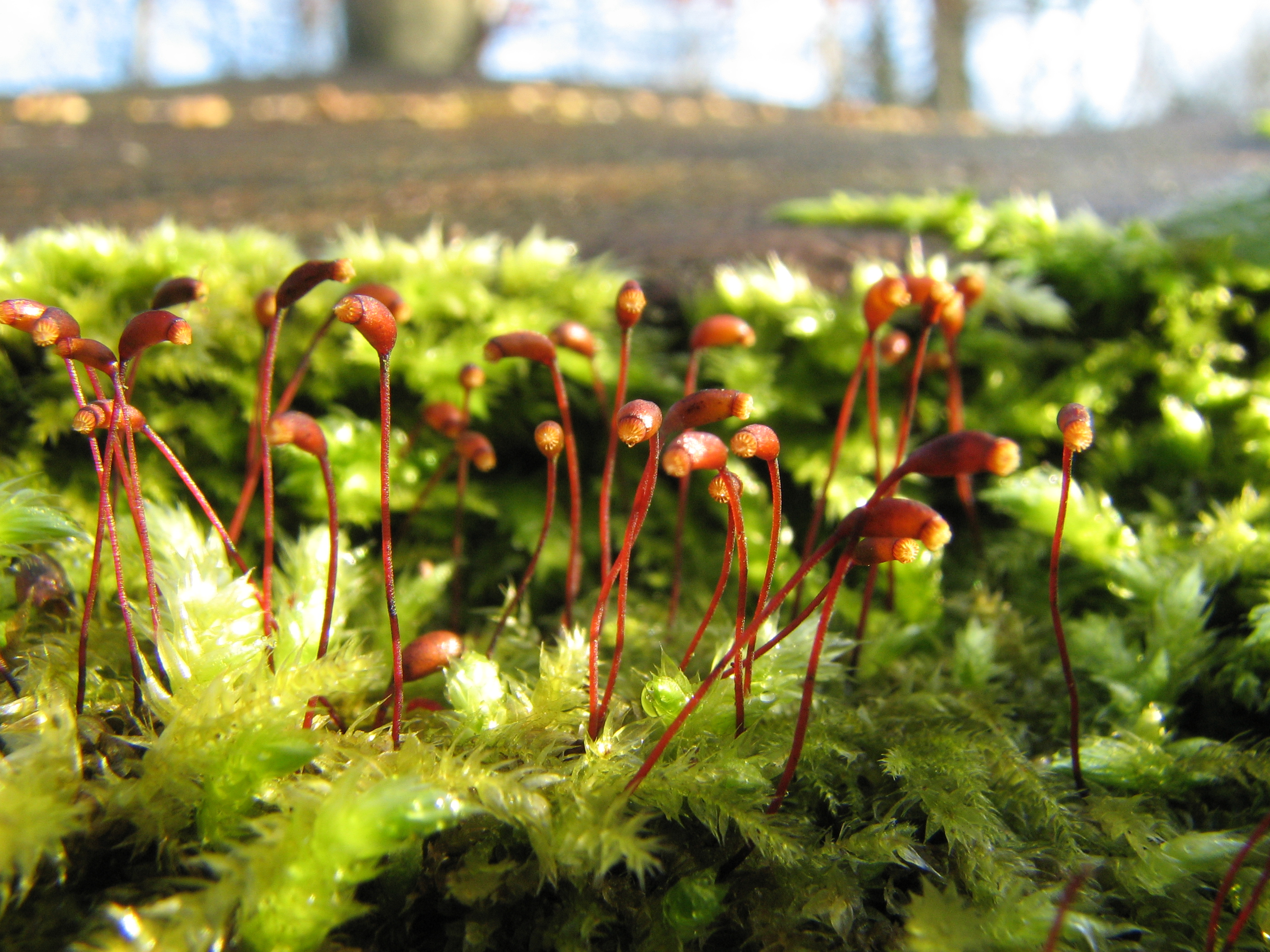
Detail of a sporangium with a beak-shaped operculum

Hypnales are mosses with pinnately or irregularly branched, reclining stems, with varying appearances. The stem contains only a reduced central vascular bundle, which is seen as a recent derived trait in mosses. The stems are covered with paraphyllia or pseudoparaphyllia, reduced filamentous or scaly leaves.

The ordinary stem leaves are ovate to lanceolate, often with leaf wing cells. The midvein is often limited to the lower half of the leaf blade, or has completely disappeared. The cells of the leaf blade are prosenchymatic, many times longer than wide, with pointed ends interlocking.

The sporophyte consists of a regularly shaped sporangium on a long stalk or seta. The spores are distributed via a ring-shaped opening with two rows of teeth, the peristome, which before ripeness is closed by a beak-shaped operculum. The enlarged venter or calyptra is cap-shaped and smooth.

== Habitat, distribution and paleobiology ==
Hypnales are terrestrial, epiphytic or lithophytic plants that occur in the most diverse biotopes and are distributed worldwide. Many species of this family are not picky concerning their substrate and habitat. The earliest fossils of representatives of the Hypnales are known only from the Tertiary, indicating that this group is young compared to other groups of mosses.

'Feathermoss' is a term used in classifying and describing certain boreal forests. An example of this occurrence is within the Black Spruce/Feathermoss climax forest, often having moderately dense canopy and featuring a forest floor of feathermosses including Hylocomium splendens, Pleurozium schreberi and Ptilium crista-castrensis. These weft-form mosses are shaped to allow the needles to fall into them rather than covering them, so they grow over the needles.

== Classification ==
In 2010, genetic research suggests that the Fabroniaceae are the sistergroup of all other Hypnales. Next to branch-off are the Catagoniaceae. According to this analysis, some of the remaining taxa may be polyphyletic (Lembophyllaceae, Neckeraceae, Brachytheciaceae), others paraphyletic (Lepyrodontaceae enclose Stereophyllaceae, part of the Brachytheciaceae enclose Symphyodontaceae and two separate parts of the Lembophyllaceae, part of the Neckeraceae enclose the remaining Brachytheciaceae, another part of the Lembophyllaceae enclose Rigodiaceae and Pterigynandraceae and a second part of the Neckeraceae). The rest of the families, the third part of the Neckeraceae and the fourth part of the Lembophyllaceae could be monophyletic.

Originally, the Leucodontales were treated as a separate order, which were defined by a reduced peristome. However, molecular analyses rejected separation of the Leucodontales and the Hypnales. The former was absorbed into the latter.

== Families ==
As of 2024, GBIF accepts the following families:

Immediate children

- Acrocladiaceae (5)
- Amblystegiaceae (284)
- Anomodontaceae (45)
- Antitrichiaceae (6)
- Brachytheciaceae (867)
- Callicladiaceae (6)
- Calliergonaceae (36)
- Catagoniaceae (16)
- Climaciaceae (12)
- Cryphaeaceae (90)
- Echinodiaceae (11)
- Entodontaceae (161)
- Fabroniaceae (98)
- Fontinalaceae (53)
- Habrodontaceae (4)
- Helodiaceae (14)
- Heterocladiellaceae (4)
- Hydropogonellaceae (2)
- Hylocomiaceae (77)
- Hypnaceae (781)
- Jocheniaceae (3)
- Lembophyllaceae (157)
- Lepyrodontaceae (10)
- Leskeaceae (152)
- Leucodontaceae (56)
- Meteoriaceae (293)
- Microtheciellaceae (2)
- Miyabeaceae (19)
- Myriniaceae (13)
- Myuriaceae (61)
- Neckeraceae (454)
- Orthostichellaceae (30)
- Phyllogoniaceae (4)
- Plagiotheciaceae (195)
- Pleuroziopsaceae
- Prionodontaceae (8)
- Pseudoleskeaceae (58)
- Pseudoleskeellaceae (14)
- Pterigynandraceae (6)
- Pterobryaceae (218)
- Pylaisiaceae (107)
- Pylaisiadelphaceae (456)
- Regmatodontaceae (9)
- Rhizofabroniaceae (6)
- Rhytidiaceae (8)
- Rutenbergiaceae (17)
- Scorpidiaceae (34)
- Sematophyllaceae (722)
- Sorapillaceae (3)
- Stereodontaceae (33)
- Stereophyllaceae (56)
- Symphyodontaceae (148)
- Taxiphyllaceae (73)
- Theliaceae (4)
- Thuidiaceae (174)
- Trachylomataceae (14)

Figures in brackets are approx. how many species per genus.

Former familia (with new orders); Climaciaceae (-> Leucodontales), Cryphaeaceae (-> Leucodontales), Echinodiaceae (-> Hypnobryales), Fontinalaceae (-> Isobryales), Lembophyllaceae (-> Bryales), Leptodontaceae (-> Leucodontales), Lepyrodontaceae (-> Isobryales), Leucodontaceae (-> Leucodontales), Meteoriaceae (-> Leucodontales), Microtheciellaceae (-> Orthotrichales), Neckeraceae (-> Leucodontales), Prionodontaceae (-> Isobryales), Pterobryaceae (-> Leucodontales), Regmatodontaceae (-> Isobryales), Rutenbergiaceae (-> Isobryales) and Sorapillaceae (-> Dicranales)
