= Penny (given name) =

Penny is a feminine given name and nickname, often a short form (hypocorism) of Penelope.

== Given name ==
- Penny Abernathy (born 1951), American journalist
- Penny Abeywardena, American foreign policy advisor
- Penny Alison (born 1983), South African sailor
- Penny Allman-Payne (born 1970), Australian politician
- Penny Anderson (rugby union) (born 1977), Australian rugby player
- Penny Anderson, British ecologist
- Penny Arcade (performer) (born 1950), American performance artist, playwright and actress
- Penny Asbell, American ophthalmologist
- Penny Axtens (born 1974), New Zealand composer
- Penny Bacchiochi (born 1960), American Republican politician
- Penny Drue Baird, American interior designer
- Penny Baker (born 1965), American model and actress
- Penny Balfour, American actress
- Penny Ballem, Canadian physician and government administrator
- Penny Banner (1934–2008), American professional wrestler
- Penny Barg (born 1964), American tennis player
- Penny Barker (born 1985), Canadian curler
- Penny Bethke (1950–2011), Canadian community leader
- Penny Bickle, British archaeologist and academic
- Penny Boudreau, Canadian woman
- Penny Boumelha, Academic administrator and English literature scholar
- Penny Bovell (born 1956), Australian artist
- Penny Boxall (born 1987), Scottish poet
- Penny Brahms (born 1951), British actress
- Penny Bright (1954–2018), New Zealand activist
- William Penny Brookes (1809–1895), British doctor, campaigner and a progenitor of the modern olympic movement
- Penny Budoff (1939–2008), American doctor and medical researcher
- Penny Busetto, South African writer
- Penny Carnaby (born 1949), New Zealand librarian and Professor of Digital Knowledge Systems
- Penny Casdagli (born 1948), Greek actress
- Penny Chapman, Australian television producer
- Penny Chuter (1942–2024), British rower, rowing coach and official
- Julia Penny Clark (born 1945), American attorney
- Penny Clark (born 1975), British sailor
- Penny Collenette, Canadian lawyer, professor, and politician
- Penny Colman (born 1944), American author
- Penny Cook (1957–2018), Australian actress, writer and presenter
- Penny Coomes (born 1989), English ice dancer
- Penny Cooper (born 1969), Canadian field hockey player
- Penny Cousineau-Levine (born 1947), Canadian photography theorist, curator, artist and professor
- Penny Crissman (born 1943), American politician
- Penny Crone (born 1935), American reporter
- Penny Cula-Reid (born 1988), Australian rules footballer
- Penny Dale (born 1954), English illustrator and writer
- Penny Daniels (born 1954), American writer and reporter
- Penny Dann (1964–2014), British children's book illustrator
- Penny J. Davies, Scottish mathematician
- Penny Lee Dean (born 1955), American long distance swimmer
- Penny DeHaven (1948–2014), American singer-songwriter
- Penny Dhaemers (1926–2022), American designer, artist
- Penny Downie (born 1954), Australian actress
- Penny Drake (born 1977), American actress
- Penny Driver (born 1952), Anglican Archdeacon
- Penny Dunbabin (1958–2014), Australian field hockey player
- Penny Dwyer (1953–2003), British comedy writer and performer
- Penny Ann Early (1943–2023), American athlete
- Penny Edwards (actress) (1928–1998), American actress
- Penny Edwards (cyclist) (born 1981), Welsh racing cyclist
- Penny L. Elkins, American university president
- Penny Endersby, British researcher and academic
- Penny Von Eschen (born 1958), American historian
- Penny Flanagan (born 1970), Australian singer and author
- Penny Ford (born 1964), American musician
- Penny Forse (born 1949), British athlete
- Penny Framstad (born 1960), American singer-songwriter
- Penny Fuller (born 1940), American actress
- Penny Gillies (born 1951), Australian hurdler
- Penny Gordon-Larsen, American professor of nutrition
- Penny Greely (born 1971), American Paralympian curler and sitting volleyball player
- Penny Grice-Whittaker (born 1964), British golfer
- Penny Rafferty Hamilton (born 1948), American pilot
- Penny Hammel (born 1962), American golfer
- Penny Harrington (1942–2021), American police officer
- Penny Hart (born 1996), American football player
- Penny Harvey (born 1956), British anthropologist
- Penny Haxell (born 1967), Canadian mathematician
- Penny Healey (born 2005), British archer
- Penny Heaton, American physician
- Penny Dewi Herasati (born 1968), Indonesian diplomat
- Penny Herscher, American executive
- Penny Hill (musician), American singer-songwriter
- Penny Hodge (1920–2016), Canadian office worker and activist
- Penny Houston (born 1942), American politician from Georgia
- Penny Hubbard (born 1953), American politician
- Penny Hughes (born 1959), British businesswoman
- Penny Hulse, New Zealand politician
- Penny Hunt (born 1948), New Zealand sprinter
- Penny Irving (born 1955), British actress
- Penny James (born 1969), British businesswoman
- Penny Jay (1925–2006), American singer-songwriter
- Penny Johnson Jerald (born 1961), American actress
- Penny Johnes, British environmental scientist
- Penny Johnson (born 1956), Director of UK Government Art Collection
- Penny Junor (born 1949), English journalist and author
- Penny Kinsella (born 1963), New Zealand cricketer
- Penny M. Kris-Etherton, American dietitian
- Penny Lancaster (born 1971), English model and photographer, wife of Rod Stewart
- Penny Lane (filmmaker) (born 1978), American independent filmmaker
- Penny Lane (model) (born 1994), English fashion model
- Penny Lang (1942–2016), Musical artist
- Penny LaRocque (born c. 1943), Canadian retired curler
- Penny Layden (born 1969), British actress
- Penny Lebyane (born 1976), South African media personality
- Penny Lernoux (1940–1989), American writer and journalist
- Penny Lin (born 1978), Taiwanese actress
- Penny Lord (1927–2014), American Catholic media figure
- Penny Low (born 1967), Singaporean politician
- Penny Fellows Lumley (born 1963), British tennis player
- Penny Marshall (1943–2018), American actress and director, best known for playing a character in Laverne & Shirley
- Penny McCoy (born 1949), American alpine skier
- Penny Priddy (born 1944), Canadian politician
- Penny Pritzker (born 1959), American businesswoman, civic leader and philanthropist
- Penny Pulz (born 1953), Australian golfer
- Penny Tai (born 1978), Malaysian-Chinese singer
- Penny Vincenzi (1939–2018), British novelist
- Penny Wolin (born 1953), American portrait photographer and visual anthropologist
- Penny Woolcock (born 1950), British filmmaker, opera director and screenwriter

== Nickname ==
=== Short for Penelope ===
- Penny Jamieson (born 1942), Bishop of Dunedin in the Anglican Church of New Zealand (1989–2004)
- Penny Jordan (1946–2011), English best-selling and prolific writer
- Penny Mordaunt (born 1973), British Member of Parliament
- Penny Pitou (born 1938), American retired alpine skier
- Penny Singleton (1908–2003), American film actress
- Penny Smith (born 1958), English television presenter and newsreader
- Penny Taylor (born 1981), Australian basketball player
- Penny Tranter (born 1961), Scottish meteorologist
- Penny Valentine (1943–2003), British music journalist
- Penny Wong (born 1968), Australian Labor Party senator
- Penny Wright (born 1961), Australian Greens senator

=== Other ===
- Penny Chenery (1922–2017), American racehorse owner and breeder
- Penny Demar (born 1952), American politician
- Penny Thompson (1917–1975), American aviator
- Penny Hardaway (born 1971), American retired National Basketball Association player

== Fictional characters ==
- The title character of Penny (comic strip)
- The titular character of British cartoon Penny Crayon
- Penny, in the sitcom The Big Bang Theory
- Penny Morris, in the Welsh children's animated television series Fireman Sam
- Penny Valentine, in the British television series Holby City
- Penny Widmore, in the television series Lost
- Penny the Polar Bear, in the television series Peppa Pig

== See also ==
- Penny (disambiguation)
- Penny (surname)
