= Penny (disambiguation) =

The penny is a coin used in several English-speaking countries.

Penny or pennies may also refer to:

== People and fictional characters ==
- Penny (given name), a list of people and fictional characters with the given name or nickname
- Penny (surname), a list of people

== Places ==
- Penny, Calloway County, Kentucky, an unincorporated community in the United States
- Penny, Pike County, Kentucky, an unincorporated community in the United States
- Penny, British Columbia, a community in Canada
- Penny Ice Cap, Baffin Island, Canada
- Penny's Bay, Hong Kong

== Music ==
- Penny (rapper) (born c. 1981)
- Penny (album), 1977 album by Penny McLean
- "Pennies", a song by The Cool Kids
- "Pennies", a song on the Smashing Pumpkins EP Zero
- "Pennies", a song by Die Monster Die from Withdrawal Method
- "Penny", a song by Night Ranger from Dawn Patrol
- "Penny", a song from the film Sarkaru Vaari Paata
- The Pennies, The Five Pennies, or Red Nichols and His Five Pennies, 1926- American jazz band

== Other uses ==
- Penny Magazine, a British weekly published from 1832 to 1845
- The Penny, a 2007 novel by Joyce Meyer and Deborah Bedford
- Penny Publications, an American magazine publisher
- Penny Skateboards, an Australian manufacturer of skateboards
- Penny (supermarket), a German chain
- Pennies (digital charity box), a UK micro-donation scheme
- Penny (unit), a unit of nail size
- Fiat Penny, a panel van version of the Fiat Duna
- Penny (restaurant), a seafood restaurant in New York City

== See also ==
- Pennyweight, a unit of mass
- Penney, a surname
- Penney (disambiguation)
- Penni (disambiguation)
- Pennie (soccer), a type of jersey
- Pennie, the official health insurance marketplace in the U.S. state of Pennsylvania
