= Bethke =

Bethke is a surname. Notable people with the surname include:

- Andrew-John Bethke, South African composer
- Arap Bethke (born 1980), Mexican actor
- Bruce Bethke (born 1955), American author
- Des Bethke (born 1943), Australian rules footballer
- Erik Bethke (born 1972), American computer games developer
- Ingo, Holger and Egbert Bethke, who escaped from East Germany
- Jean Bethke Elshtain (1941–2013), American political philosopher
- Katie Bethke (born 1988), American soccer player
- Michael Bethke, American murderer
- Penny Bethke (1950–2011), Canadian co-operative business leader
- Sigfried Bethke (born 1954), German physicist
