= Pen-y-Lan =

Pen-y-Lan is a Welsh place name:

- Pen-y-lan, Ceredigion, a hamlet in west Wales
- Penylan, a district of the city of Cardiff, Wales
- Pen-y-Lan, a district of the city of Swansea
- Pen-y-Lan Hall, a grade II listed mansion located near the village of Ruabon in Wrexham County Borough

== See also ==
- Penny Lane (disambiguation)
