= Steve Penney =

Steve Penney may refer to:

- Steve Penney (ice hockey) (born 1961), Canadian ice hockey goaltender
- Steve Penney (footballer) (born 1964), Northern Ireland footballer

== See also ==
- Penney (disambiguation)
- Penney, surname
- Steve Penny (born 1964), American businessman and sports administrator
