= Etherton =

Etherton is an English surname. Notable people with the surname include:

- Penny M. Kris-Etherton, American dietitian
- Ralph Etherton (1904–1987), British barrister and politician
- Seth Etherton (born 1976), American baseball player and coach
- Terence Etherton, Baron Etherton (1951–2025), British judge and politician

== See also ==
- Etherton, Illinois, an unincorporated community in Jackson County, Illinois, United States
