= Anjouan brush warbler =

Anjouan brush warblers

Conservation status
- Least Concern (IUCN 3.1)

Scientific classification
- Kingdom: Animalia
- Phylum: Chordata
- Class: Aves
- Order: Passeriformes
- Family: Acrocephalidae
- Genus: Nesillas
- Species: N. longicaudata

Binomial name
- Nesillas longicaudata (Newton, E, 1877)
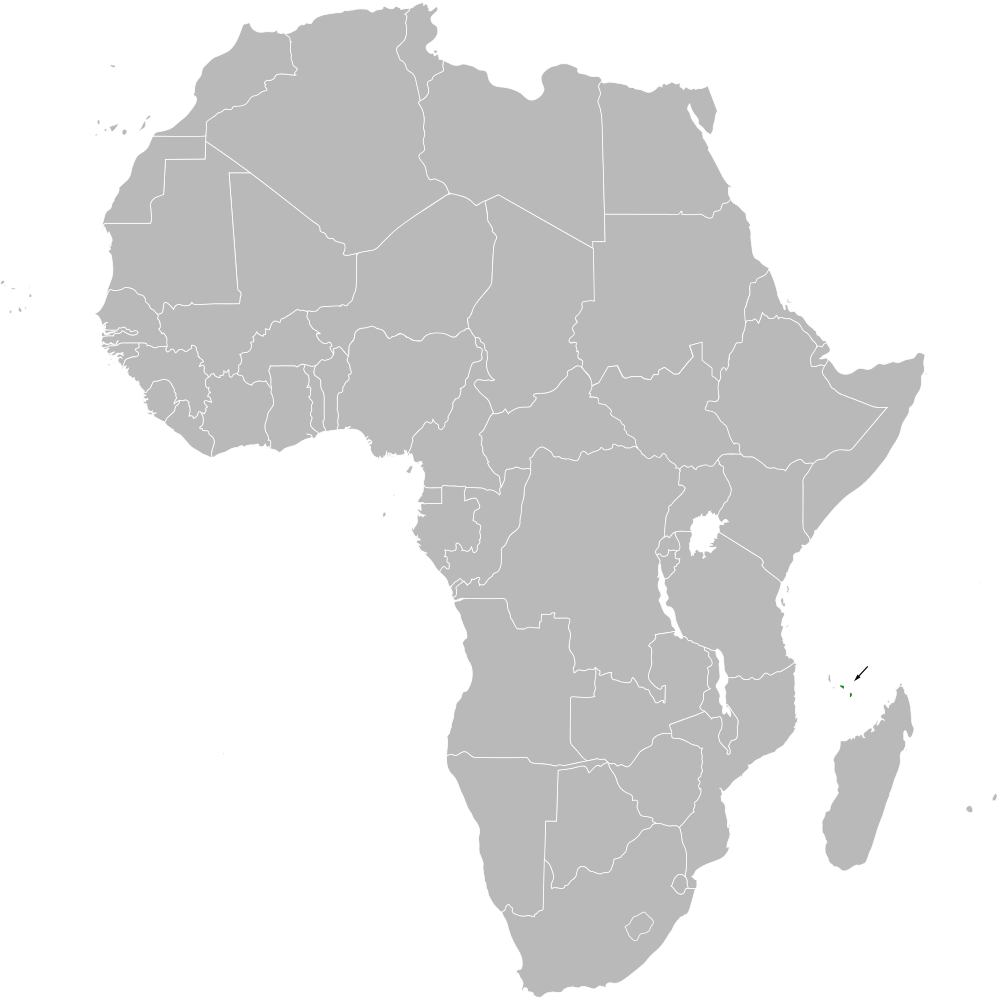
- Resident range (arrowed)

Species of bird

The Anjouan brush warbler (Nesillas longicaudata) is a species of Old World warbler in the family Acrocephalidae. Clements lumps this bird into the Malagasy brush warbler N. typica. This is supported by the IUCN, whereas the IOC recognizes it as a valid species. It is endemic to the Comoros and Mayotte.
