= Penelope (given name) =

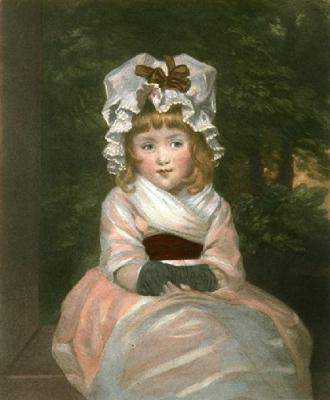
- Penelope Boothby by Joshua Reynolds.
- Pronunciation: /pəˈnɛləpi/ pə-NEL-ə-pee
- Gender: Female

Origin
- Origin: Greek mythology
- Meaning: Weaver

Other names
- Nicknames: Nell, Nellie, Nelly, Pen, Penny, Pepper, Pip, Pippa, Popi, Poppi, Poppy, Punky, Opie

Penelope, often used in reference to Homer's character, is a female first name of Greek origin. Its meaning is uncertain, but may derive from the Greek word penelops, which means duck or refers to another water fowl sacred to the Ancient Greeks. The name might also be derived from the Greek pene meaning web and either ops meaning eye or lepo, meaning unraveled, implying the meaning weaver. The name was revived in the Anglosphere by the mid-16th century and has since been in occasional use.

== Popularity ==
The name has increased in popularity in recent years. It is among the most popular names for girls in Australia, Canada, England and Wales, Italy, New Zealand, Scotland, and the United States.

== People ==
- Penelope Aitken (1910–2005), English socialite
- Penelope Aubin, English novelist
- Penelope Austin, Australian singer-songwriter
- Pénélope Bagieu (born 1982), French illustrator and comic designer
- Penelope Blackmore (born 1984), Australian rhythmic gymnast
- Penelope Blount, Countess of Devonshire (1562–1607), English noblewoman
- Penelope Boothby (1785–1791), English famous child model in British art
- Penelope Boston, American speleologist
- Penelope Bradshaw (died 1754?), British compiler of a cookery book
- Penelope Brothers, New Zealand chemistry academic
- Penelope Brown (born 1944), American anthropological linguist
- Penelope Carwardine, English painter
- Penelope Casas, American food writer
- Penelope Chetwode, English travel writer
- Penelope Coelen, South African beauty pageant contestant
- Penélope Cruz (born 1974), Spanish actress
- Penelope Delta (1874–1941), Greek author
- Penelope Dransart, Anthropologist, archaeologist, and historian
- Penelope Dudley-Ward (1914–1982), English actress
- Penelope Easton (1923–2020), American dietician, nutritionist, and educator
- Penelope Farmer (born 1939), English author
- Penelope Fillon (born 1955), wife of French politician and former Prime Minister of France François Fillon
- Penelope Fitzgerald (1916–2000), Booker Prize-winning English novelist, poet, essayist and biographer
- Penelope Ford (born 1992), American professional wrestler
- Penelope Gilliatt (1932–1993), English novelist, short story writer, screenwriter and film critic
- Penelope Heyns (born 1974), South African swimmer and double gold medalist at the 1996 Olympic Games
- Penelope Hobhouse (born 1929), British garden writer, designer, lecturer and presenter
- Penelope Hocking (born 1999), American professional soccer player
- Penelope Houston (born 1958), American singer-songwriter
- Penelope Jencks (born 1936), American sculptor
- Penelope Keith (1940–2026), English actress famous for TV sitcoms
- Penelope Lea, Norwegian climate activist
- Penelope Leach (born 1937), British psychologist
- Penelope Ligonier (1749–1827), English aristocrat and socialite
- Penelope Lively (born 1933), British fiction writer
- Penelope Maddy (born 1950), American philosopher
- Pénélope McQuade (born 1970), Canadian radio and television host
- Penélope Menchaca (born 1968), Mexican television host, singer, and actress
- Penelope Ann Miller (born 1964), American actress
- Penelope Mitchell (born 1991), Australian actress
- Penelope Mortimer (1918–1999), British journalist, biographer and novelist
- Penelope Mountbatten, Lady Ivar Mountbatten (born 1966), British philanthropist and businesswoman
- Penelope Niven (1939–2014), American academic and biographer
- Penelope Walton Rogers (1950–2023), British archaeologist
- Penelope Rosemont (born 1942), American visual artist, writer, publisher, and social activist
- Penelope Scott (born 2000), American musician, singer-songwriter, and producer
- Penelope Seidler (born 1938), Australian architect and accountant
- Penelope Spheeris (born 1945), American director, producer and screenwriter
- Penelope Stout (died after 1705), early white settler of Monmouth County, New Jersey
- Penelope Tree (born 1950), Anglo-American former fashion model prominent in swinging sixties London
- Penelope Trunk (born 1966), American writer and entrepreneur
- Penelope Wensley (born 1946), Governor of Queensland, Australia
- Penelope Wilton (born 1946), English actress
- Penelope Windust (1945–2022), American television, film, and stage actress

== Mythological figures ==
- Penelope, the wife of Odysseus in Homer's Odyssey
- Penelope (mother of Pan), mother of the god Pan in Greek mythology

== Fictional characters ==
- Penelope, in the anime Hamtaro
- Penelope, a major antagonist in the Sly Cooper video game series
- Penelope, in the 2002 animated film Barbie as Rapunzel
- Penelope Alvarez, in the television series One Day at a Time
- Penelope Benjamin, in the film Top Gun: Maverick
- Penelope Blossom, Cheryl Blossom's mother in Archie Comics and the television series Riverdale
- Penelope "Punky" Brewster, the main character in the television sitcom Punky Brewster
- Penelope Clade, in the film Strange World
- Penelope Clearwater, in the Harry Potter series
- Lady Penelope Creighton-Ward, in the 1960s television program Thunderbirds
- Penelope Featherington, in the book and television series Bridgerton
- Penelope "Penny" Fitzgerald, in the animated series The Amazing World of Gumball and The Wonderfully Weird World of Gumball
- Penelope Garcia, in the television drama Criminal Minds
- Penelope Lang, an antagonist in the animated series Atomic Betty
- Penelope Park, in the television series Legacies
- Penelope Parker, a Marvel Comics superhero
- Penelope Pitstop, a Hanna-Barbera cartoon character
- Mrs. Puff, in the television series SpongeBob SquarePants
- Penelope Pussycat, in the Looney Tunes franchise
- Penelope Shafai, in the television series Gossip Girl
- Penelope Taynt, in the television series The Amanda Show
- Penelope Wilhern, in the 2006 film Penelope, portrayed by Christina Ricci
- Penny Widmore, a recurring character on the television show Lost
- Penelope "Bunty" Windemere, a recurring character on the television series Father Brown, portrayed by Emer Kenny

== See also ==
- Penny (given name)
