= Penny (surname) =

The surname Penny may refer to:

- Andrew Penny (born 1952), British conductor
- Benjamin Penny (born 1959), Australian professor
- Brad Penny (born 1978), American professional baseball pitcher
- Diego Penny (born 1984), Peruvian goalkeeper
- George Joseph Penny (1897–1949), Canadian senator
- Giles Penny (born 1962), English sculptor
- Glynis Penny (born 1951), English long-distance runner
- James Penny (died 1799), English merchant, slave ship owner, and prominent anti-abolitionist
- Joe Penny (born 1956), English-American actor
- Malcolm Penny, British zoologist and ornithologist
- Marie Penny (died 1970), Canadian businesswoman
- Rashaad Penny (born 1996), American football player
- Scott E. Penny, American politician
- Simon Penny (born 1955), Australian artist, a.o.
- Sydney Penny (born 1971), American actress
- Thomas Penny (1532–1589), English physician and early entomologist
- Tim Penny (born 1951), American politician
- Will Penny, fictional character played by Charlton Heston in a 1968 western film
- William Penny (1809–1892), Scottish explorer of the Arctic, shipmaster, and whaler

== See also ==
- Penny (disambiguation)
- Penney
