= Penny Lane (disambiguation) =

"Penny Lane" is a song by the Beatles.

Penny Lane may also refer to:

== Places ==
- Penny Lane, Liverpool, England
- Penny Lane Mall, Calgary, Canada, 1973–2006
- Penny Lane (Guantanamo), nickname of CIA site on US Naval Base

== People ==
- Pennie Lane Trumbull, singer
- Penny Lane (filmmaker), an American independent filmmaker
- Penny Lane (model), a British fashion model
- Penny Lane (fictional character), groupie and female lead in the movie Almost Famous

== See also ==
- Penny Lane & Time, a jazz album by Kai Winding
- Penny Lane Is Dead, a 2025 Australian film
