= Asbell =

Surname list

Asbell is a surname. Notable people with the surname include:

- Jim Asbell (1914–1967), American baseball player
- Penny Asbell, American ophthalmologist
- Samuel Karnarvon Asbell (1914–1965), Canadian politician

== See also ==
- Asbel Kiprop (born in 1989), Kenyan middle-distance runner
