= Poppi (disambiguation) =

Poppi is an Italian comune.

Poppi may also refer to:

- Errol McCalla Jr., also known as "Poppi", American songwriter, producer, and multi-instrumentalist
- Francesco Morandini (c. 1544–1597), Italian painter nicknamed "il Poppi" after his native town
- Poppi (drink), an American soda beverage

== See also ==
- Poppi Castle, Poppi, Italy
- Popi (disambiguation)
- Poppy (disambiguation)
