= Shiplap =

Type of wooden board used commonly as exterior siding

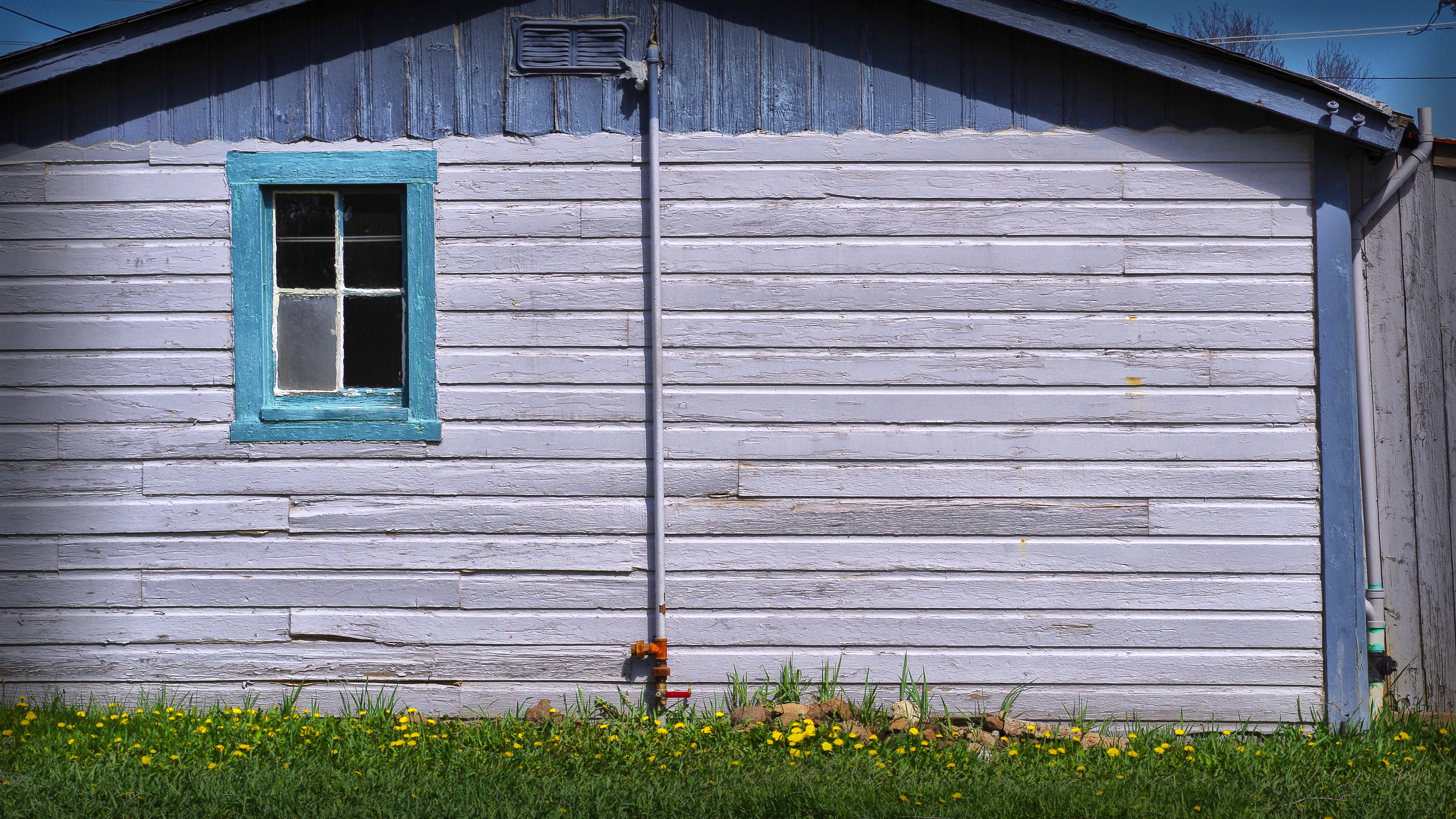
A shiplap house wall

Shiplap is a type of wooden board used commonly as exterior siding in the construction of residences, barns, sheds, and outbuildings.

== Exterior walls ==
Shiplap is either rough-sawn 1-inch-thick (25 mm) or milled 3/4-inch-thick (19 mm) pine or similarly inexpensive wood between 3 and 10 inches (76 and 254 mm) wide with a 3/8–1/2 inch (9.5–12.7 mm) rabbet on opposite sides of each edge. The rabbet allows the boards to overlap in this area. The profile of each board partially overlaps that of the board next to it creating a channel that gives shadow line effects, provides excellent weather protection and allows for dimensional movement. The term "shiplap" is often used to describe any rabbeted siding material that overlaps in a similar fashion.

Useful for its strength as a supporting member, and its ability to form a relatively tight seal when lapped, shiplap is usually used as a type of siding for buildings that do not require extensive maintenance and must withstand cold and aggressive climates. Rough-sawn shiplap is attached vertically in post and beam construction, usually with 6d–8d (51–65 mm) common nails, while milled versions, providing a tighter seal, are more commonly placed horizontally, more suited to two-by-four frame construction.

Small doors and shutters, such as those found in barns and sheds, are often constructed of shiplap cut directly from the walls, with only thin members framing or crossing the back for support. Shiplap is also used indoors for the rough or rustic look that it creates when used as panelling or a covering for a wall or ceiling.

== Interior design ==
In interior design, shiplap is a style of wooden wall siding characterized by long planks, normally painted white, that are mounted horizontally with a slight gap between them in a manner that evokes exterior shiplap walls. A disadvantage of the style is that the gaps are prone to accumulating dust.

Installing shiplap horizontally in a room can help carry the eye around the space, making it feel larger. Installing it vertically helps emphasize the height of the room, making it feel taller. Rectangular shiplap pieces can be placed in a staggered zig-zag layout to add texture and enhance the size of the room. Shiplap can also be installed on the ceiling, to draw the eye upwards.
