= Penney (disambiguation) =

Penney is a common English surname.

Penney may also refer to:

- JCPenney, American department store chain
- Penneys, Irish clothing store
- Penney Farms, Florida, U.S.
- Penney's game, a two-player coin tossing game

== See also ==
- Penny (disambiguation)
