= Penni =

Penni may refer to:

- One hundredth of the Finnish markka currency
- Gianfrancesco Penni, Italian Renaissance artist, or his brothers Luca and Bartolomeo

== See also ==
- Penny (disambiguation)
