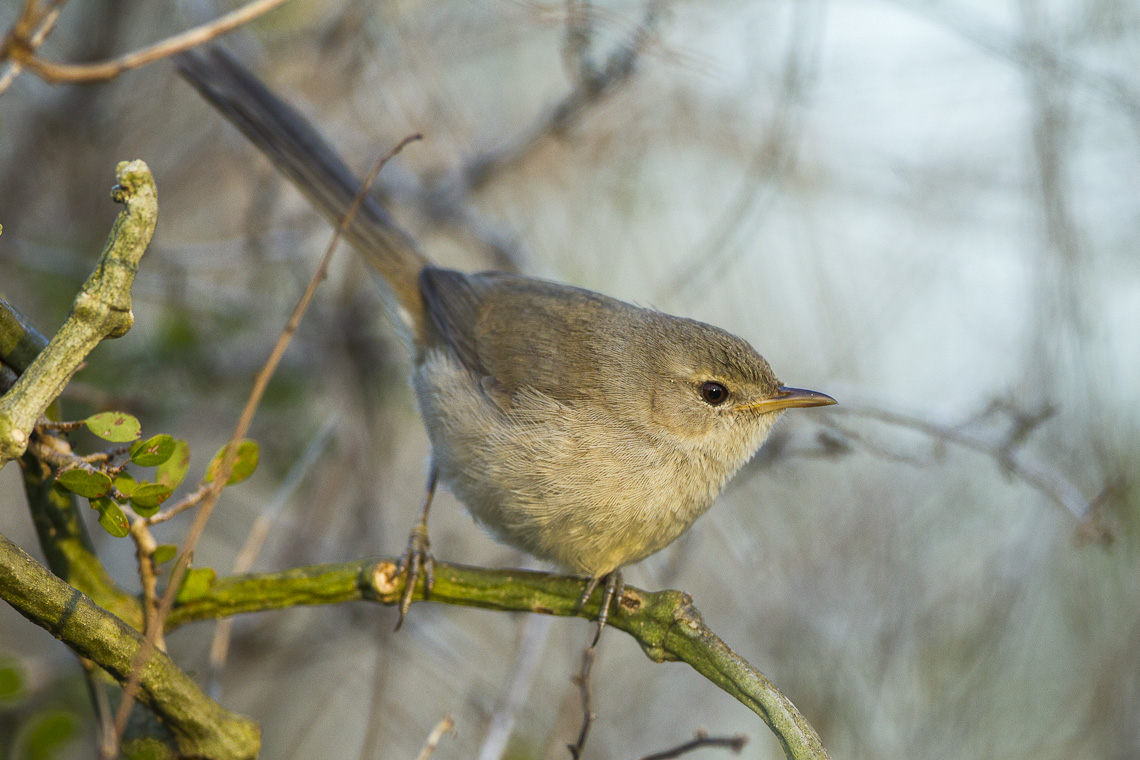

Conservation status
- Least Concern (IUCN 3.1)

Scientific classification
- Kingdom: Animalia
- Phylum: Chordata
- Class: Aves
- Order: Passeriformes
- Family: Acrocephalidae
- Genus: Nesillas
- Species: N. lantzii

Binomial name
- Nesillas lantzii (Grandidier, 1867)
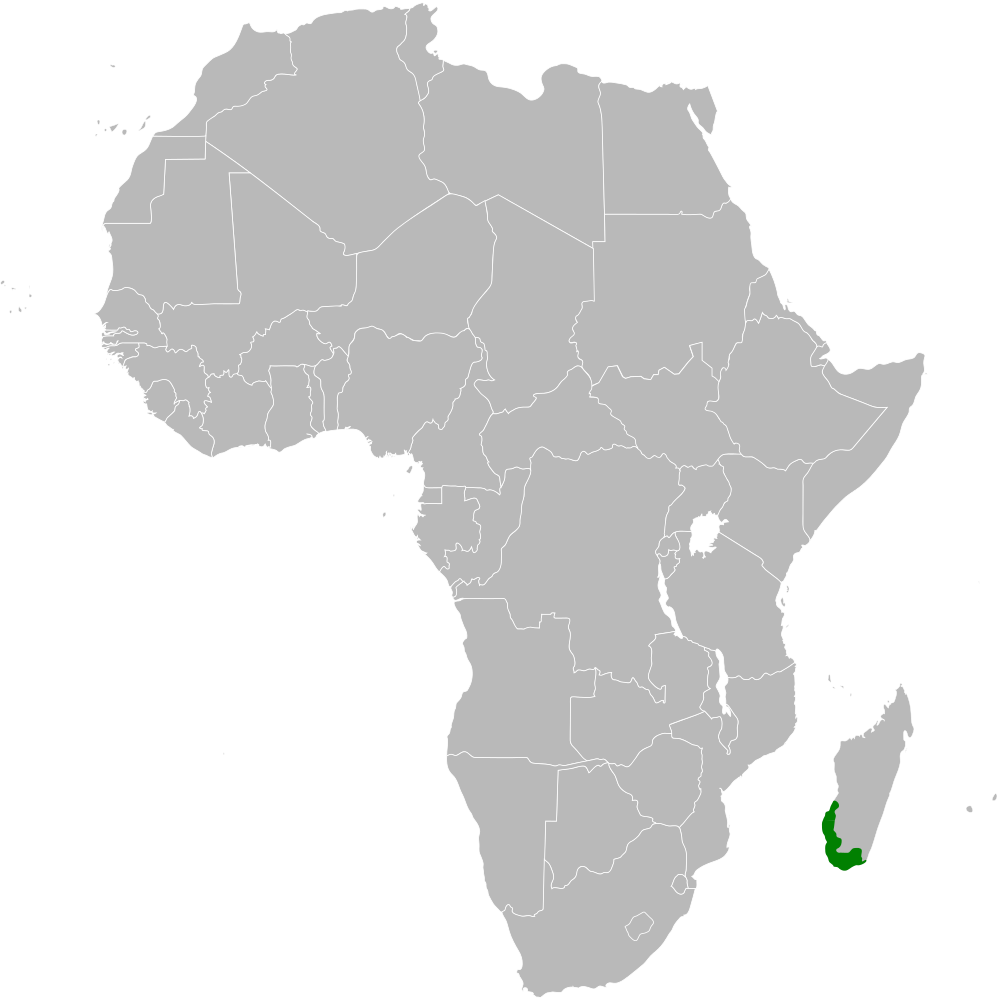
- Distribution of Subdesert Brush Warbler Resident

= Subdesert brush warbler =

Species of bird

The subdesert brush warbler (Nesillas lantzii), also known as Lantz's brush-warbler, is a species of Old World warbler in the family Acrocephalidae. It is found only in Madagascar.
