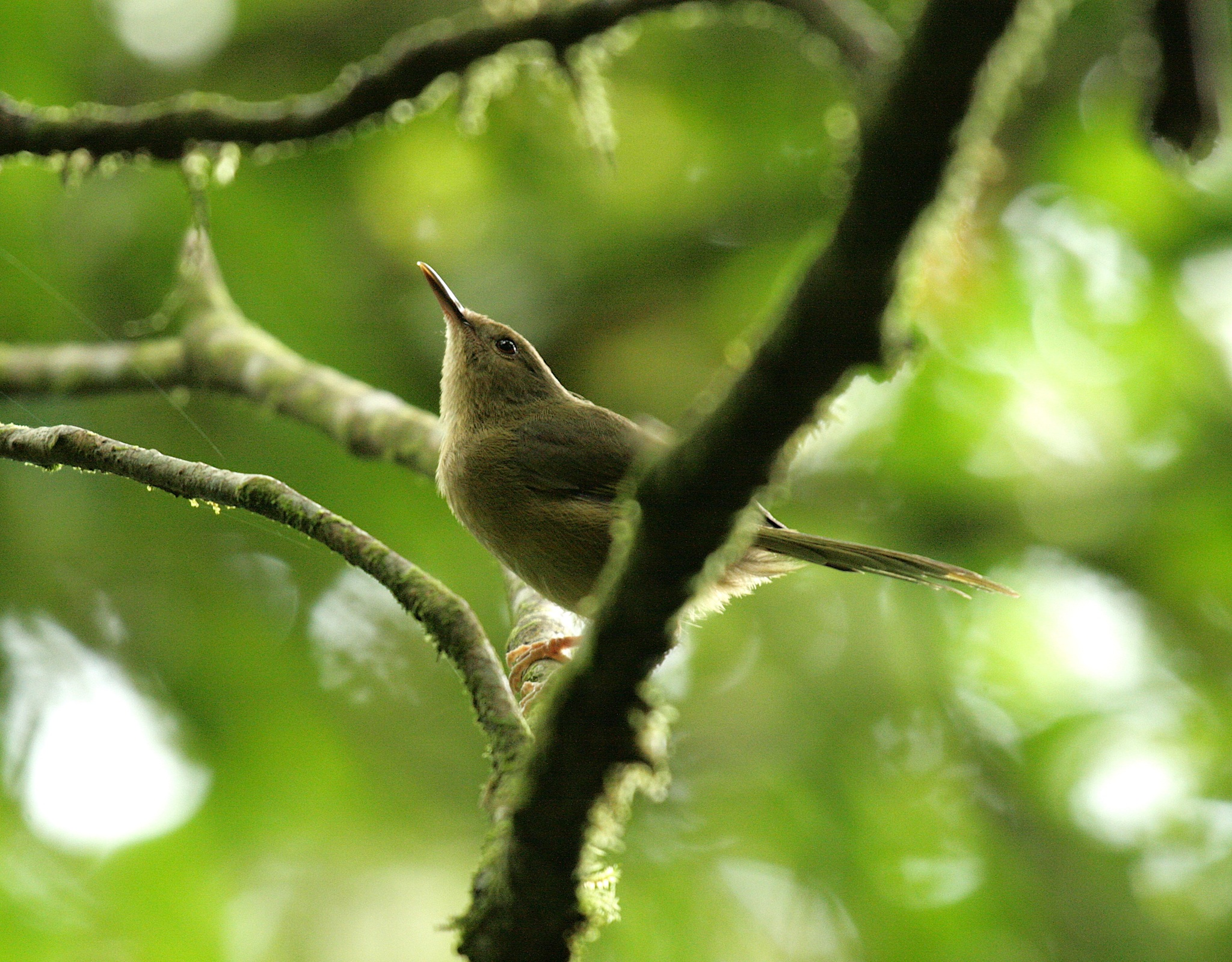

Conservation status
- Endangered (IUCN 3.1)

Scientific classification
- Kingdom: Animalia
- Phylum: Chordata
- Class: Aves
- Order: Passeriformes
- Family: Acrocephalidae
- Genus: Nesillas
- Species: N. mariae

Binomial name
- Nesillas mariae Benson, 1960
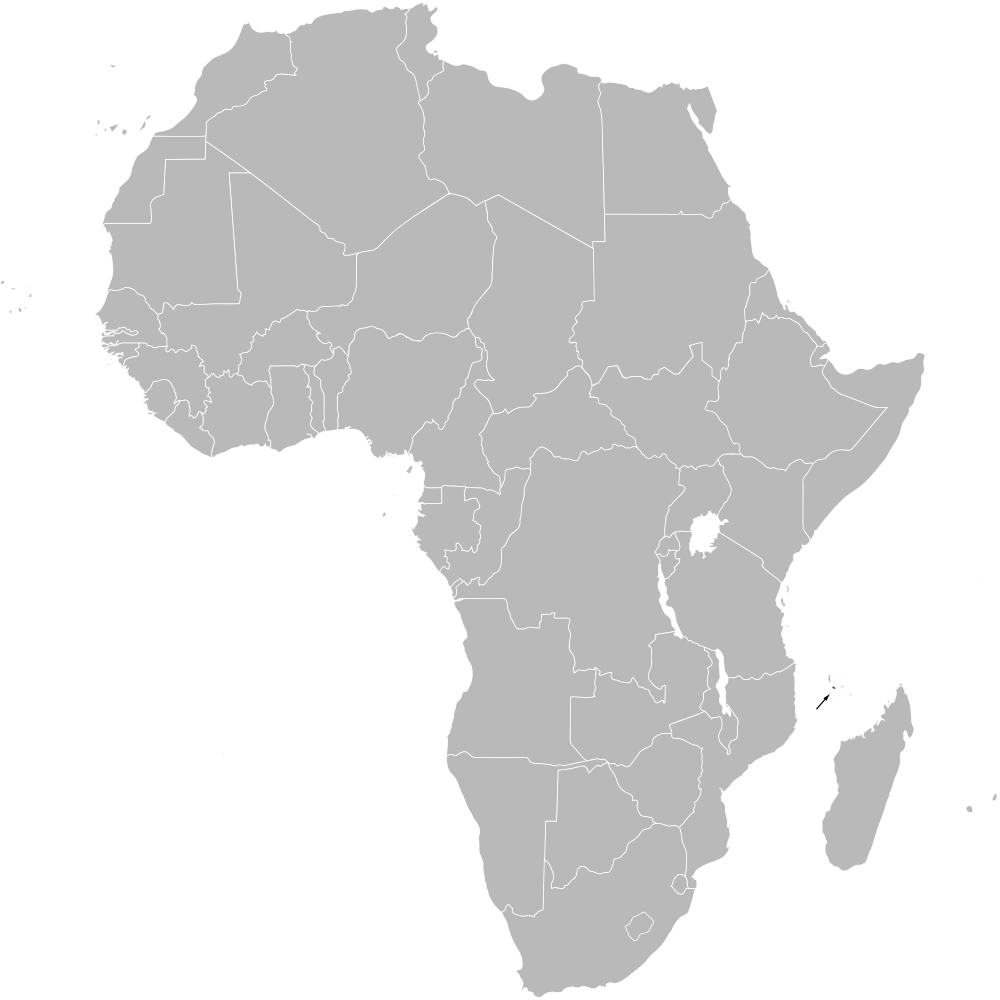

= Moheli brush warbler =

Species of bird

The Moheli brush warbler (Nesillas mariae) is a species of Old World warbler in the family Acrocephalidae. It is found only in Comoros. Its natural habitat is subtropical or tropical moist montane forests.
