= Pennyweight =

Unit of mass

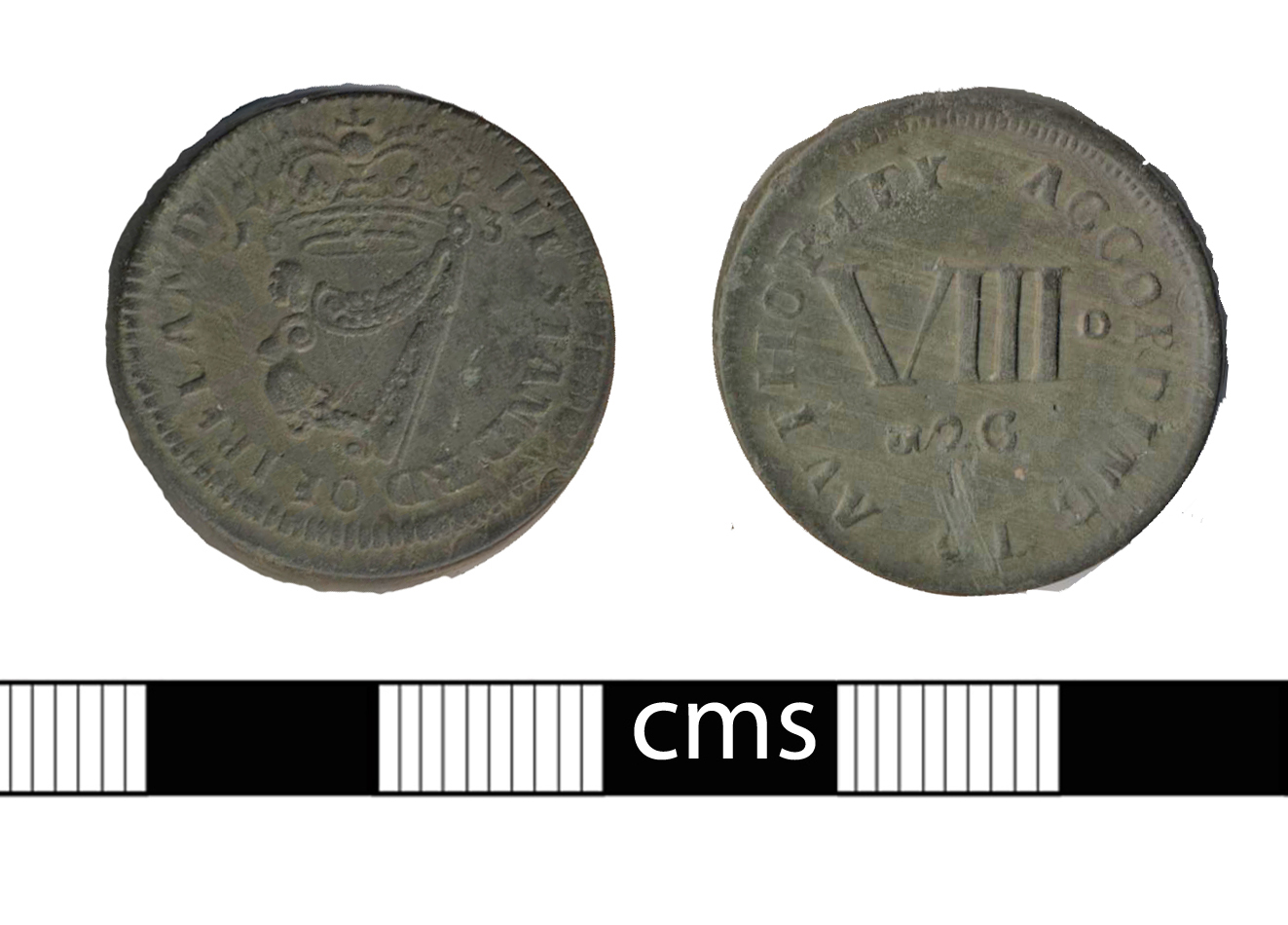
- 17th-century Irish weight, 8 dwt

General information
- Unit system: Troy weight
- Unit of: Mass
- Symbol: dwt

Conversions
1 dwt in ...	... is equal to ...
- Troy: 1/240 troy pound
- Avoirdupois: 48/875 oz
- SI units: 1.55517384 g

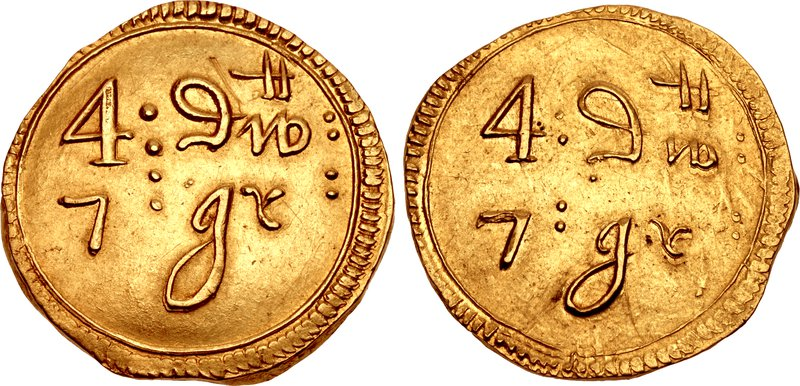
Irish gold pistole, bearing its weight (4 dwt 7 gr) (National Museum of Ireland – Decorative Arts and History)

A pennyweight (dwt) is a unit of mass equal to 24 grains, 1/20 of a troy ounce, 1/240 of a troy pound, 48/875 avoirdupois ounce and exactly 1.55517384 grams. It is abbreviated dwt, d standing for denarius – (an ancient Roman coin), and later used as the symbol of an old British penny (see £sd).

== History ==
In the Middle Ages, an English penny's weight was literally, as well as monetarily, 1/20 of an ounce and 1/240 of a pound of sterling silver. At that time, the pound unit in use in England was the Tower pound, equal to 7,680 Tower grains (also known as wheat grains). The medieval English pennyweight was thus equal to 32 Tower grains. When Troy weights replaced Tower weights in 1527, the Troy weights were defined in such a way that the old Tower pound came out to exactly 5,400 Troy grains (also known as barleycorns), the Tower pennyweight 22 1/2 Troy grains (and thus approximately 1.46 grams). After 1527, the English pennyweight was the Troy pennyweight. of 24 Troy grains. Thus the Troy pound, ounce, and pennyweight, with their definitions given in terms of the Troy grain instead of in terms of the Tower grain, were 1/15 or 6.667% more than the Tower equivalents.

== Usage ==
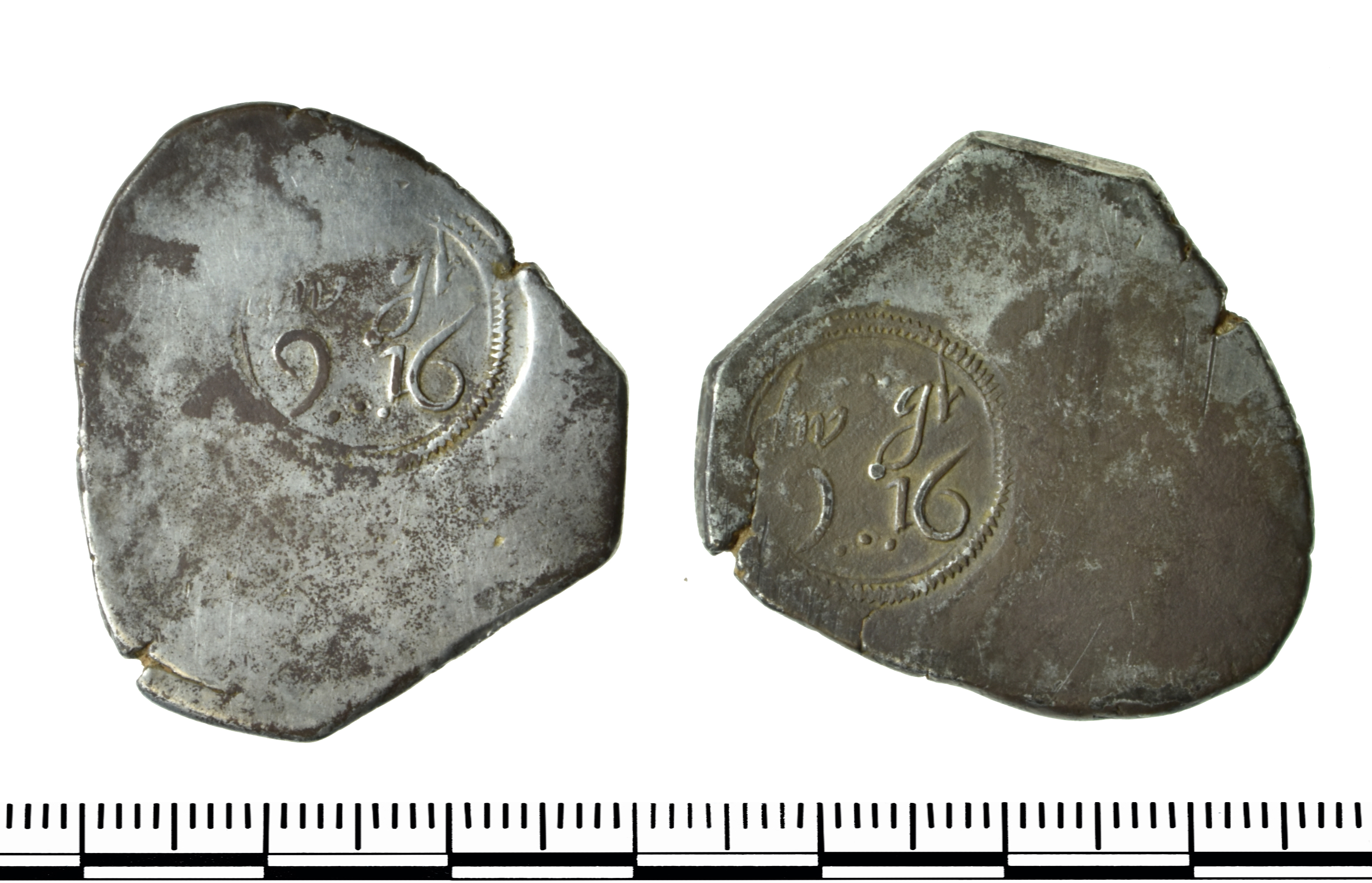
Silver half crown struck in Ireland c. 1642 with weight, 9dwt: 16gr (15 grams) stamped onto it.

The troy pound and the pennyweight lost their official status in the United Kingdom in the Weights and Measures Act 1878; only the troy ounce and its decimal subdivisions remained official. The troy ounce enjoys a specific legal exemption from metrication in the UK.

The pennyweight is the common weight used in the valuation and measurement of precious metals. Jewellers use the pennyweight in calculating the amount and cost of precious metals used in fabricating or casting jewellery. Similarly, dentists and dental labs still use the pennyweight as the measure of precious metals in dental crowns and inlays.

Pennyweight and grains are still used to weigh gooseberries in competitions in Cheshire, northwest UK. Over the Pennines in Yorkshire the alternative drams and grains measurement has been used since a new set of scales was purchased by the Egton Bridge Old Gooseberry Society in 1937. As of 2018, the world record for the heaviest gooseberry of 41 dwt 11 gr (64.5 g) was held by Kelvin Archer of Cheshire.

The most common abbreviation for pennyweight is dwt; d, for the Roman denarius, was the abbreviation for penny before Decimalisation of the British monetary system. Alternative abbreviations are pwt and PW.

== Uses unrelated to weight ==
Although the abbreviations are the same, the pennyweight bears no relation to the weight of the American penny nail. That name is derived from the price for a hundred nails in 15th century England: the larger the nail, the higher the cost per hundred. The pennyweight also bears no relation to the weight of the American "penny" (1 cent) coin, which weighs 2.5 g (for those minted after 1982).

== Conversion ==
1 pennyweight	= 24 grains
	= 1/20 Troy ounce
	= 1/240 Troy pound
	= 1.55517384 grams
