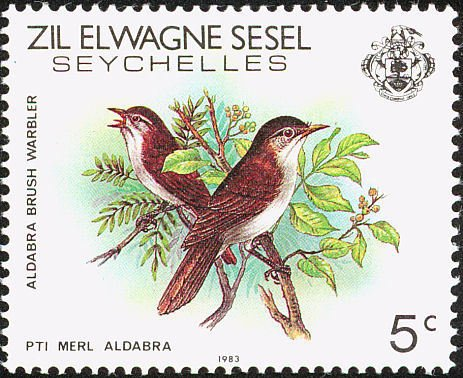
- Species featured on a 1983 Seychelles postage stamp

Conservation status
- Extinct (1983) (IUCN 3.1)

Scientific classification
- Kingdom: Animalia
- Phylum: Chordata
- Class: Aves
- Order: Passeriformes
- Family: Acrocephalidae
- Genus: Nesillas
- Species: †N. aldabrana

Binomial name
- †Nesillas aldabrana Benson & Penny, 1968

Synonyms
- Nesillas aldabranus (lapsus)

= Aldabra brush warbler =

Extinct species of bird

The Aldabra brush warbler (Nesillas aldabrana) is an extinct bird in the acrocephalid warbler family. It was endemic to the atoll of Aldabra in the Seychelles and an individual was last seen in 1983.

== Description ==
The Aldabra brush warbler was a slender bird with relatively short wings and a long, pointed tail. It reached a total length of 18 to 20 cm (7.1 to 7.9 in). The upper parts were dun and the underparts a rather paler hue. The song was never recorded but the call was a nasal, three-syllable chirrup.

== Ecology ==
The Aldabra brush warbler was a shy and retiring bird, difficult to observe in the dense undergrowth in which it lived. It was most readily located by its chirruping call.

== Discovery and extinction ==
The Aldabra brush warbler was discovered by British ornithologists Constantine Walter Benson, Malcolm Penny and Tony Diamond in 1967 and described in 1968 by Benson and Penny on the basis of a male, a female and a nest with 3 eggs. Juveniles were never found.

After the discovery the brush warbler was not seen until a survey by Robert Prys-Jones of the British Museum of Natural History from 1974 to 1976. At the end of 1975 he found six further birds which were all males. The birds were ringed and photographed. In 1983, only one male was observed and the Aldabra brush warbler was considered as the rarest and (in its occurrence) most restricted bird in the world. It was confined to a 10 ha large coastal strip on the Aldabran island of Malabar. Following intensive surveys, the extinction of this bird was confirmed in 1986. It has been listed as officially extinct by the IUCN since 1994.

The possible reasons for its extinction could be attributed to the presence of rats, cats and goats introduced to the atoll many years previously.
