= Eighth Avenue Place =

Building complex in downtown Calgary, Alberta, Canada

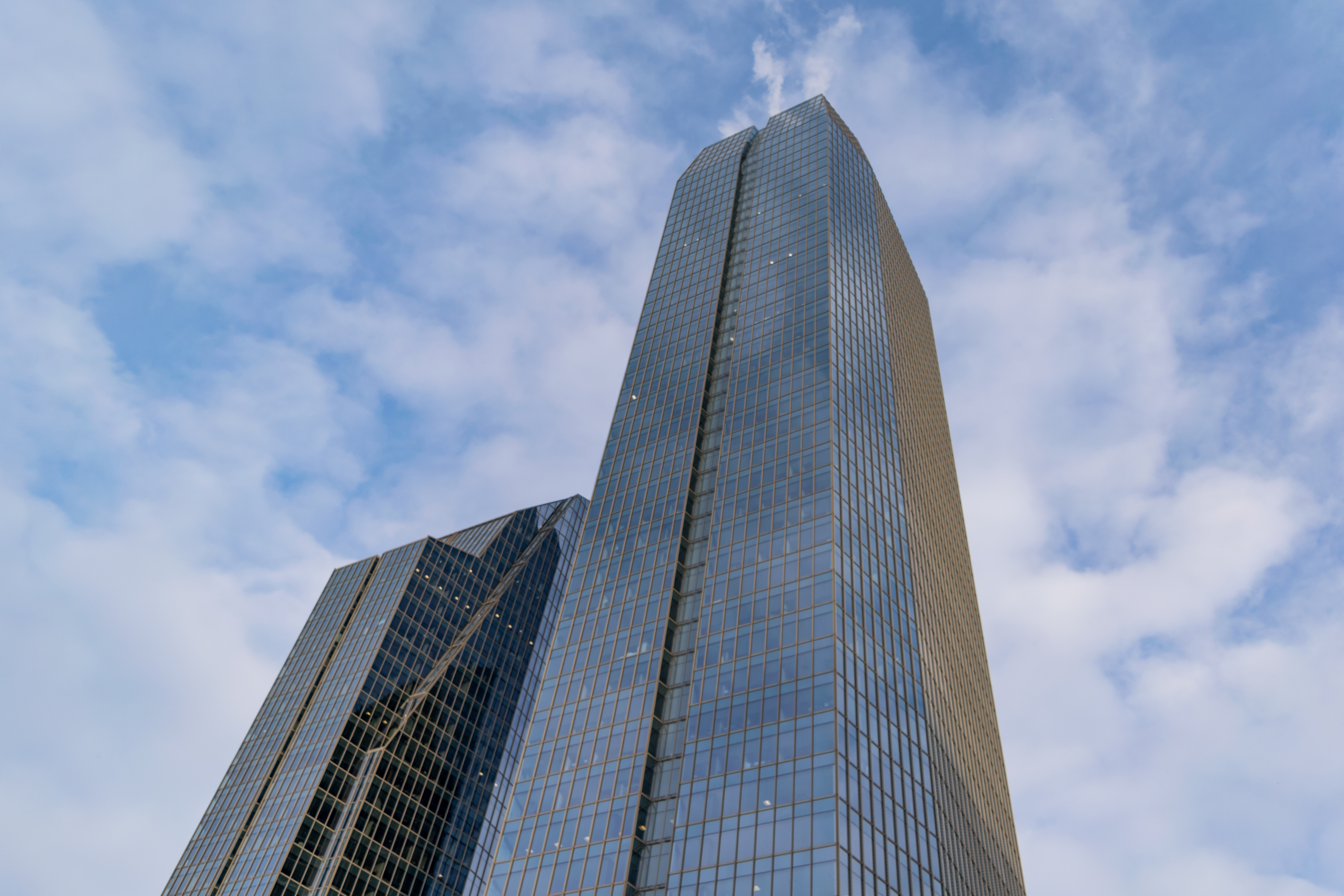
- Eighth Avenue Place in 2017
- Former names: Eighth Avenue Place

General information
- Status: Completed
- Type: Office
- Location: Calgary, Alberta, Canada
- Coordinates: 51.045522°N 114.07289°W
- Construction started: 2008
- Completed: East tower April 11, 2011, West tower 2014
- Owner: AIMCo, Ivanhoe Cambridge, Matco

Height
- Roof: 212 m (696 ft) (East), 177 m (581 ft) (West)
- Top floor: 51 rooftop (East), 41 rooftop (West)

Technical details
- Floor count: 49 floors (East), 40 (West)
- Floor area: 1,850,000 sq ft (172,000 m^{2})
- Lifts/elevators: 21 elevators (East), 16 elevators (West), 4 parkade elevators

Design and construction
- Architects: Pickard Chilton, Gibbs Gage Architects, Kendall Heaton Associates
- Developer: Hines
- Main contractor: EllisDon

Eighth Avenue Place is a 1,850,000 sq ft (172,000 m^{2}) twin-tower building complex located in downtown Calgary, Alberta, Canada. The complex includes a 49-storey 212 m (696 ft) East tower, 40-storey 177 m (581 ft) West office tower, and a three-storey indoor urban park.

The complex is housed on the site of the former Penny Lane Mall, originally intending to keep the historic name as "Penny Lane Towers", the project has since been renamed.

== Construction ==
Demolition of the old mall was completed in September 2007. Excavation of the parkade below the building commenced in December 2007 and construction of the 49-storey east tower, and the parkade begun in Summer 2008. Eighth Avenue Place East was completed in 2011 and is currently the fifth-tallest building in Calgary. Eighth Avenue Place West was completed later in 2014.

== Design ==
The structures, designed by Gibbs Gage Architects to have a Rocky Mountain theme, have a western-facing pale-green glass wall mimicking mountain waters and glaciers. The remainder of the building adopts a dark gray-layered appearance representing the shifting tectonic plates that built the mountains. The complex connects to the Plus 15 skywalk system, and contains a six-level underground parkade with 1,141 parking stalls. The buildings also feature landscaped terraces and plazas, a 30,000 sq ft (2,800 m^{2}) green roof, and an atrium winter garden.

Eighth Avenue Place won the 2018 BOMA Canada Earth Award for excellence in resource preservation and environmentally sound commercial building management for the Office Building class.

== Penny Lane Mall controversy ==
Prior to construction, concerns had been raised over the destruction of the 94-year-old Penny Lane Mall; however, the City of Calgary approved the project in March 2006.

== Sustainability ==
Eighth Avenue Place has been certified LEED Platinum for Core and Shell.

== Gallery ==
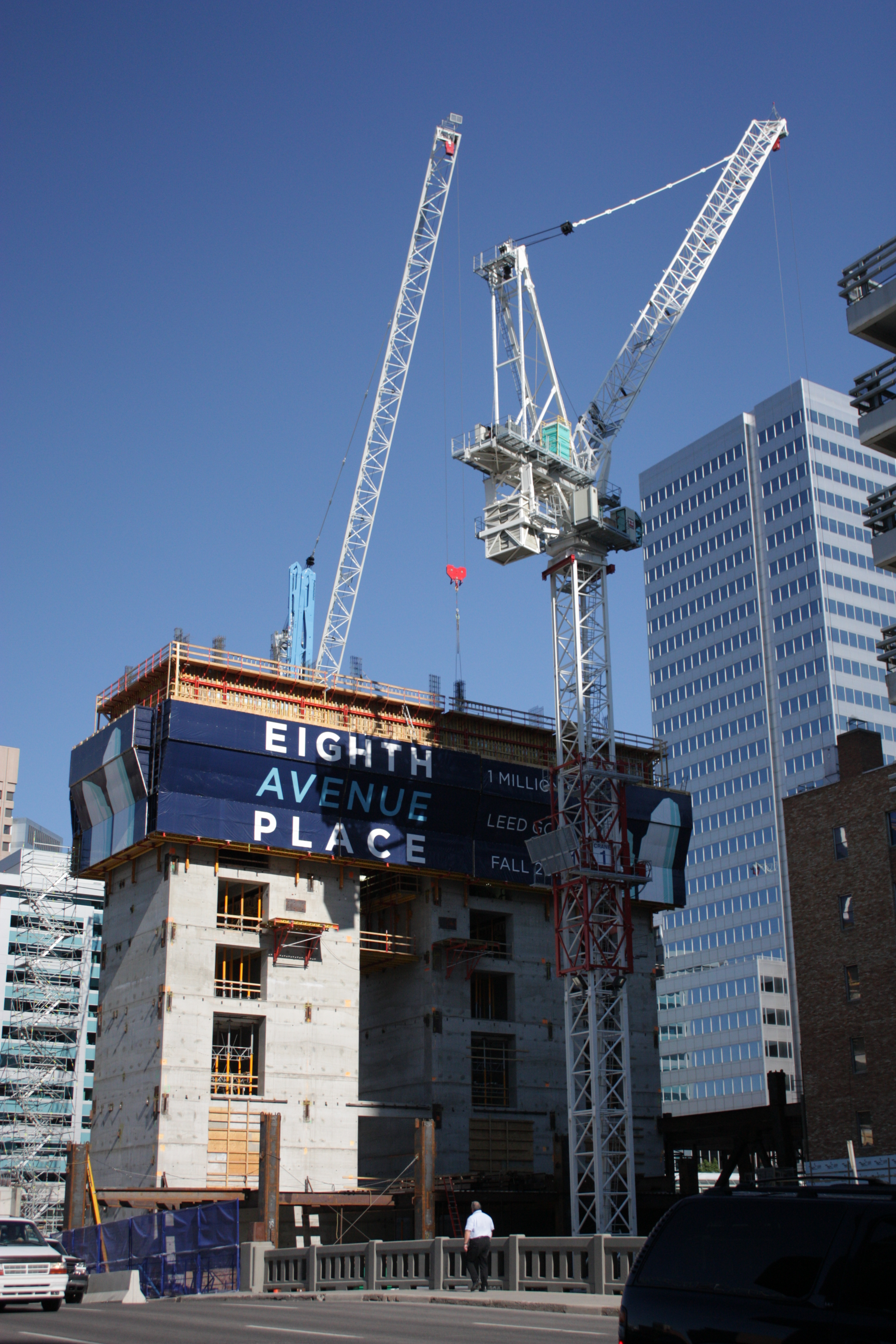
Eighth Avenue Place under construction in June 2009

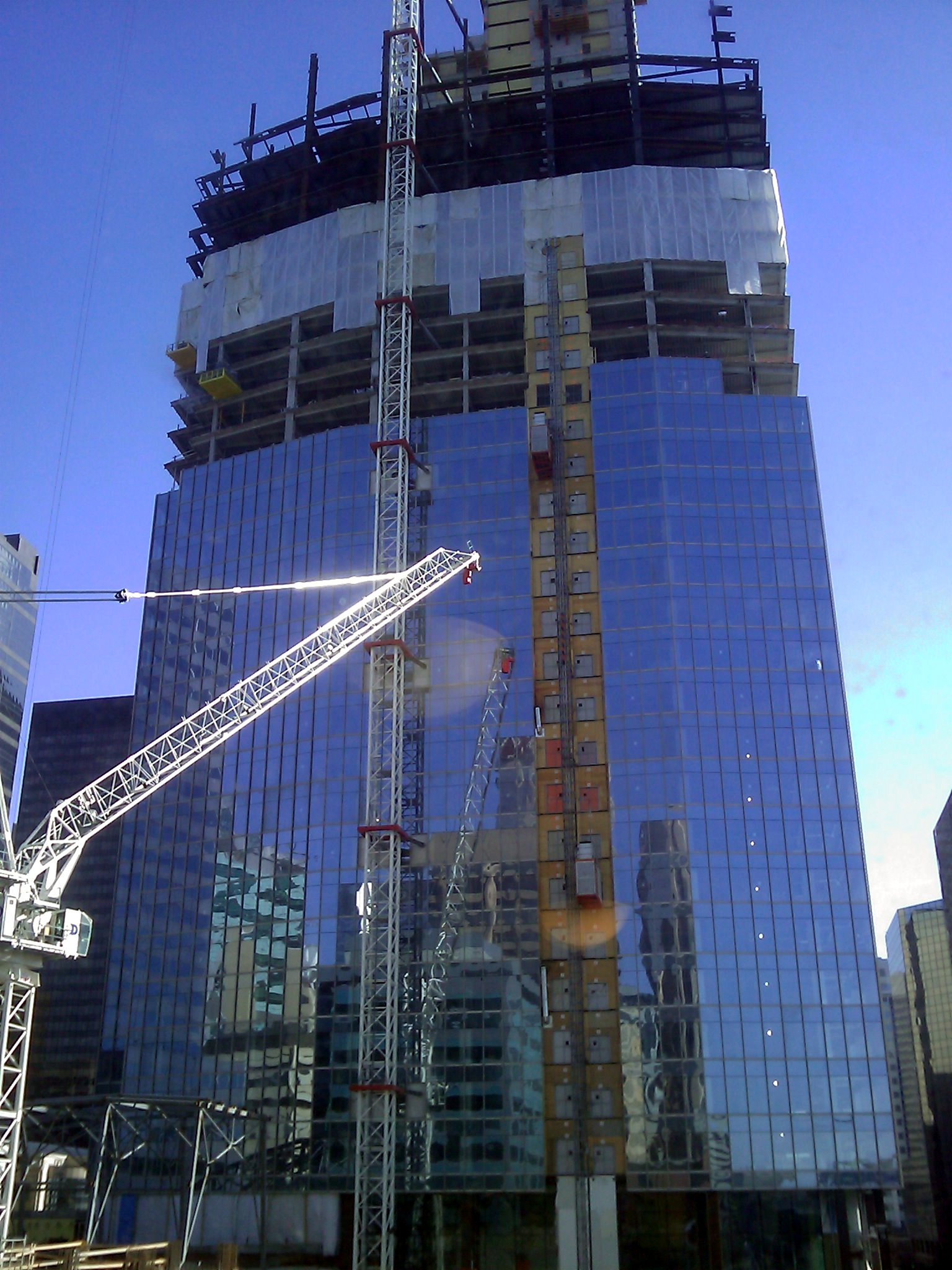
Construction in April 2010

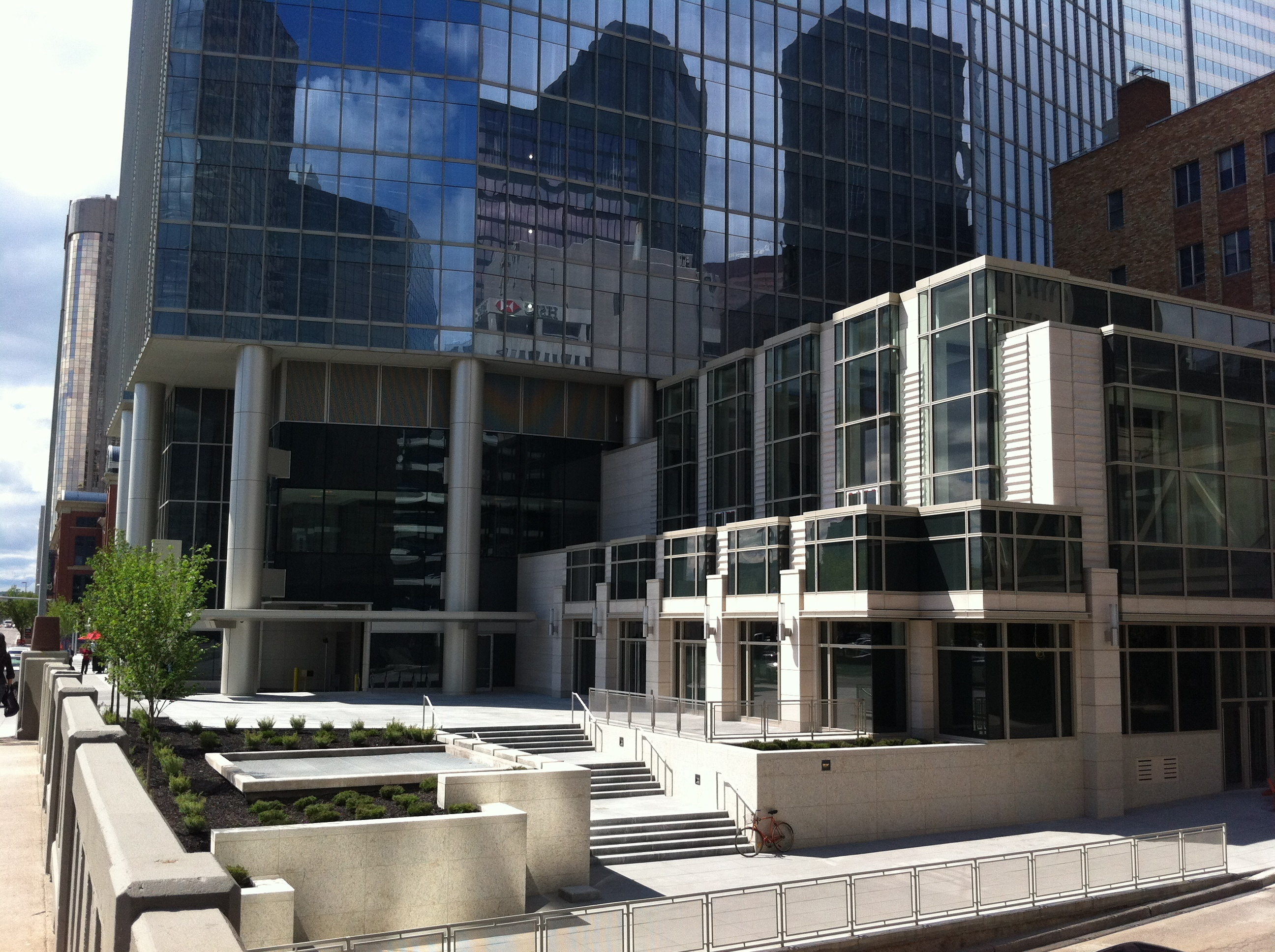
Completed lower retail floors on east side

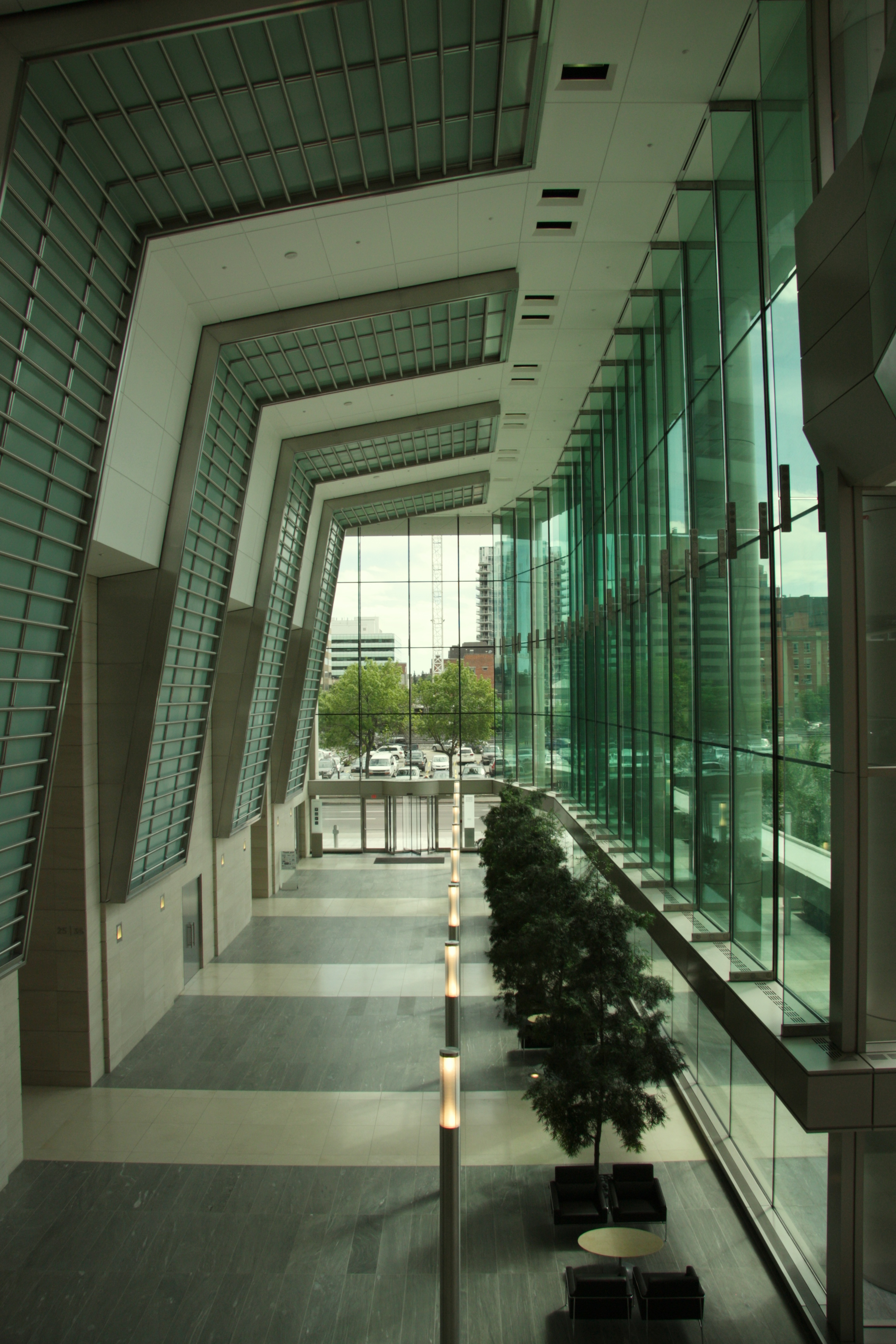
Looking south in the lobby

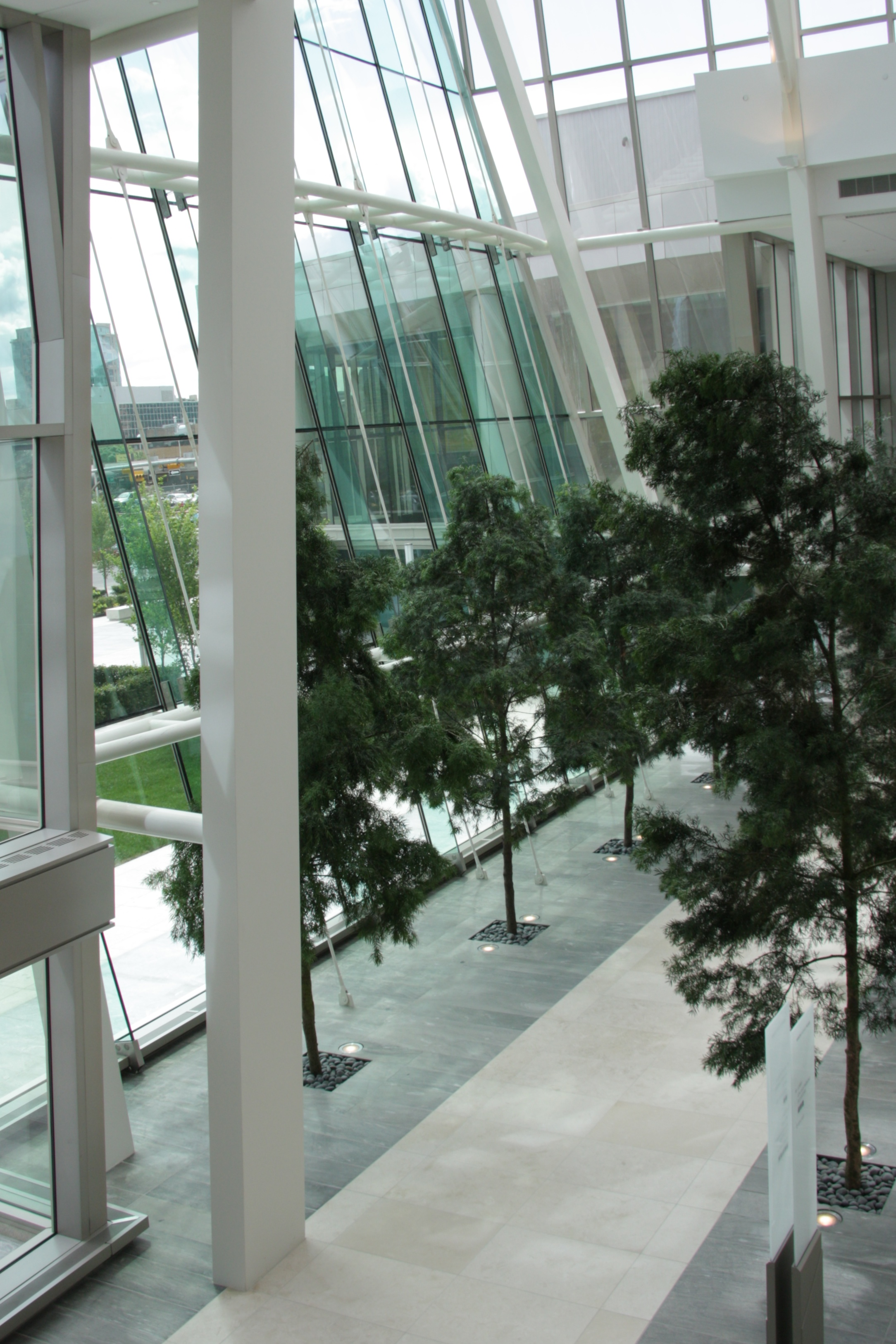
Looking southwest in the three-storey lobby

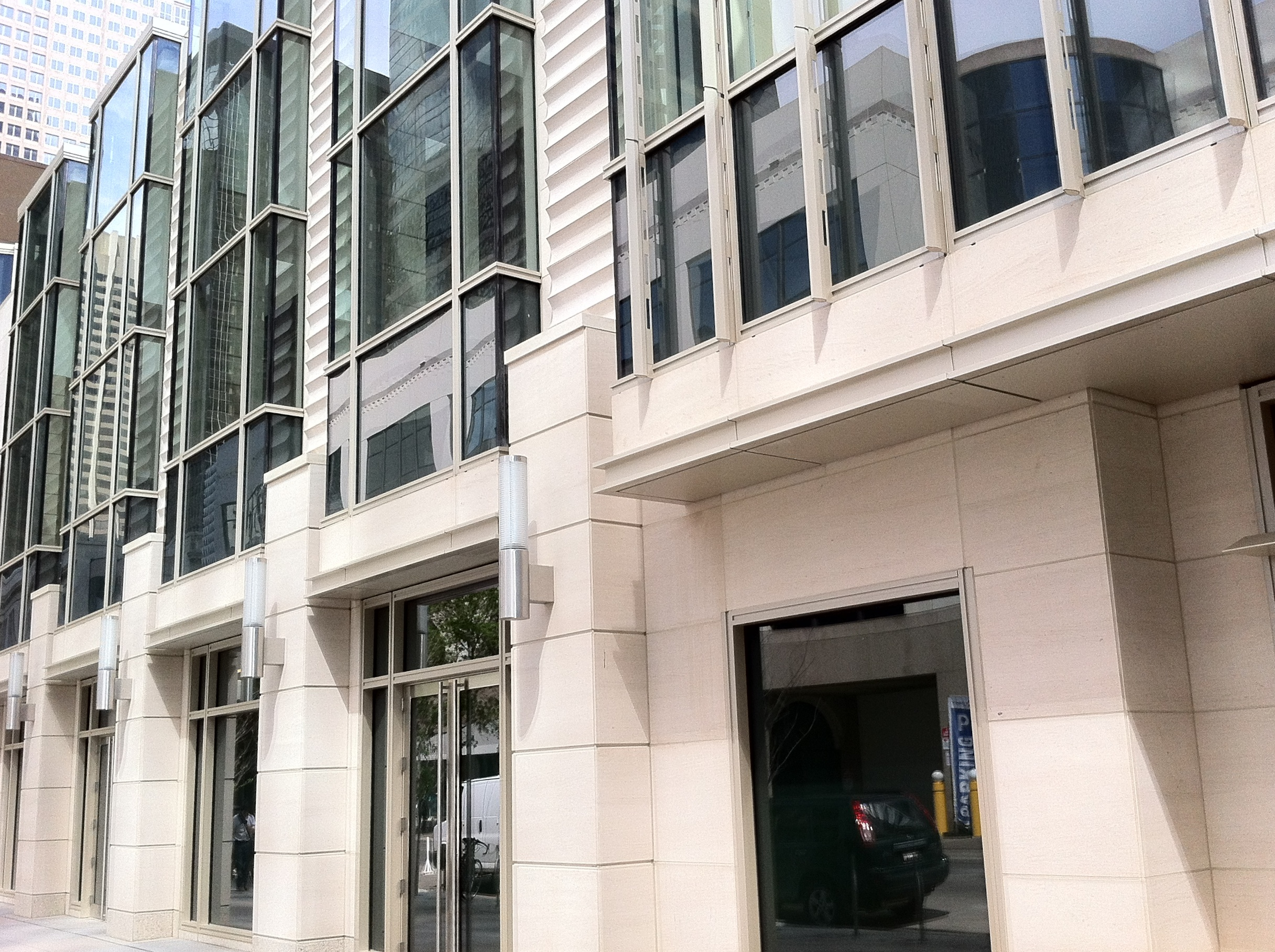
Lower retail frontage as seen from Stephen Avenue

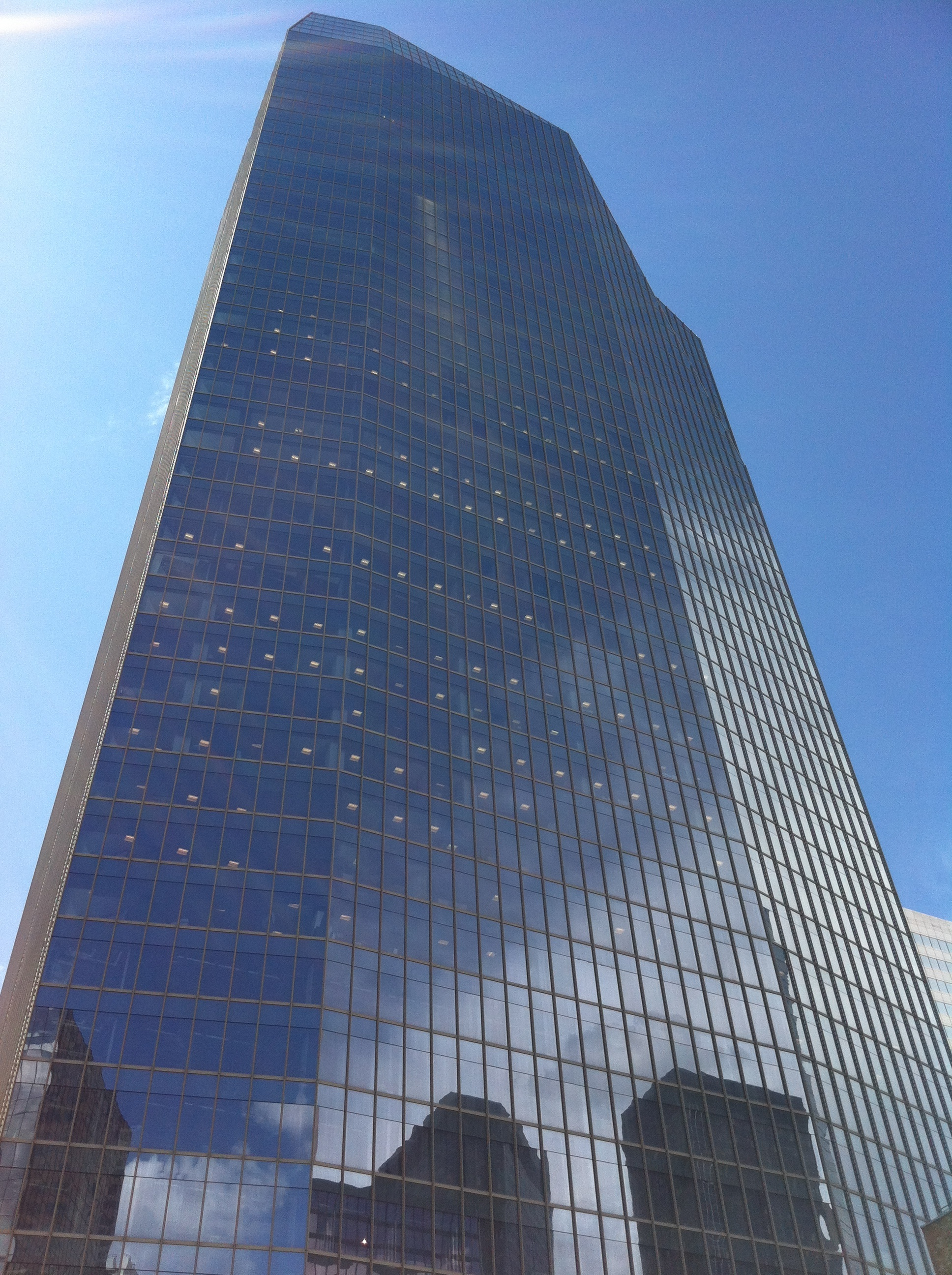
Substantial completion of the East tower, April 2011

== See also ==
- List of tallest buildings in Calgary
