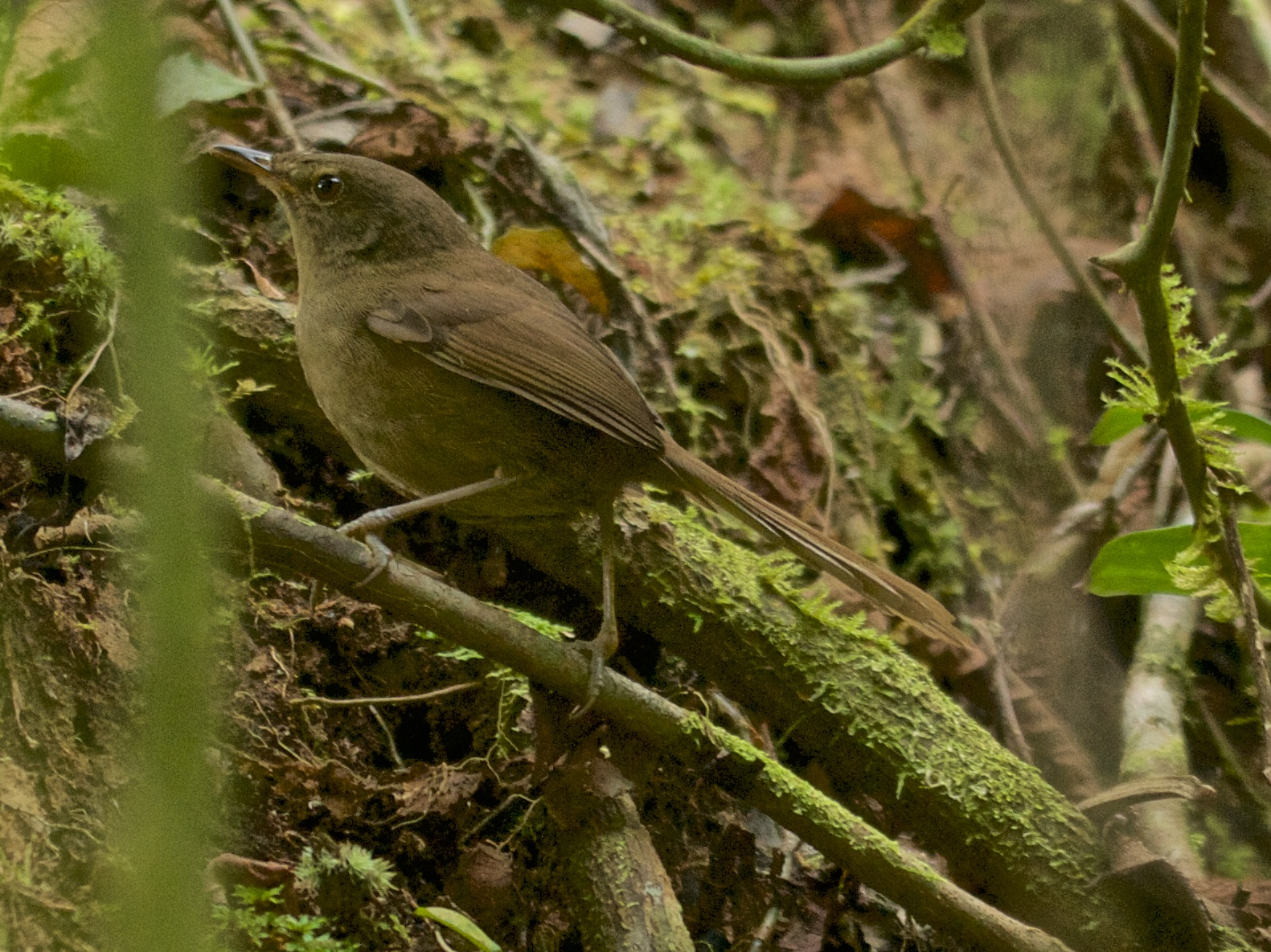
- Malagasy brush warbler (Nesillas typica)

Scientific classification
- Kingdom: Animalia
- Phylum: Chordata
- Class: Aves
- Order: Passeriformes
- Family: Acrocephalidae
- Genus: Nesillas; Oberholser, 1899

Type species
- Ellisia typica Hartlaub, 1860

= Nesillas =

Genus of birds

Nesillas is a genus of Old World warbler in the family Acrocephalidae. Established by Harry Church Oberholser in 1899, the name Nesillas comes from the Greek words nēsos, meaning "island" (a reference to Madagascar) and illas, meaning "thrush".

It contains the following five extant (and one recently extinct) species:

Image	Common name	Scientific name	Distribution
	Grande Comore brush warbler	Nesillas brevicaudata	Comoros and Mayotte.
	Subdesert brush warbler	Nesillas lantzii	Found only in Madagascar.
	Anjouan brush warbler	Nesillas longicaudata	Endemic to the Comoros and Mayotte.
	Moheli brush warbler	Nesillas mariae	Found only in Comoros.
	Malagasy brush warbler	Nesillas typica	Eastern and northern Madagascar and the Comoro Islands.
	† Aldabra brush warbler	Nesillas aldabrana	Was endemic to the atoll of Aldabra in the Seychelles; extinct, an individual was last seen in 1983.
