= Penny Drue Baird =

American interior designer and author

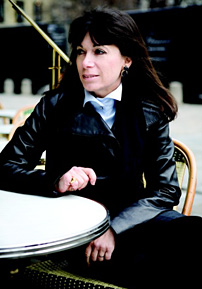
- Penny Drue Baird
- Education: University of Rochester
- Occupation: Interior designer
- Children: 6
- Website: dessinsllc.com

Penny Drue Baird is an American interior designer and author. She is the founder and principal of Dessins, LLC, an interior design firm with offices in New York and Paris. Her work encompasses residential interiors and architectural renovations, frequently combining contemporary furnishings and traditional decorative elements..

== Education and Career ==
Baird graduated from the University of Rochester, where she was elected to Phi Beta Kappa. She went on to earn her doctorate in psychology and studied interior design at the New York School of Interior Design.

Baird established her interior design practice, Dessins, which developed a portfolio of residential projects in the United States and Europe. The firm's work includes apartments, country houses, and other private residences, with an emphasis on adapting architectural features and furnishings to the character of each property and the needs of its occupants.

French architecture, antiques, and decorative traditions have been recurring influences in Baird's work. Her interest in Paris is reflected in her design projects and writing, including her book Bringing Paris Home. In 2011, the design publication Architectural Digest showcased her Paris apartment in feature titled "Penny Drue Baird. A Promise of a Year in Paris Guides and Elegant Design".

Baird's residential projects have been featured in all major magazines. These include a Mediterranean-style home in Palm Beach, Florida; an 1810 farmhouse in Pennsylvania; a Manhattan apartment; a residence in the Berkshires; and an apartment in New York City's West Village.

Her projects have also explored different historical and contemporary styles. A Manhattan apartment inspired by Art Deco, for example, was featured by Galerie magazine, while other published projects have examined her approach to combining Tuscan and modern design elements.

== Recognition and Media Coverage ==
Baird has been included on Architectural Digest's AD100 list of leading interior designers and architects. The publication has featured her work in articles and retrospectives covering her residential projects and design approach.

Baird won Rohm & Haas's "Prettiest Painted Rooms in America" competition, which was judged by interior designer Mario Buatta.

Her work and commentary have appeared in publications including Architectural Digest, Galerie, Elle Decor, Forbes, Luxe, Cottages & Gardens, and The Huffington Post. Coverage has addressed her residential projects, design philosophy, and books.

== Featured Projects ==
Baird collaborated on the decoration of Villa Alisea, a private residence overlooking Grand Cul-de-Sac in Saint Barthélemy, withHélène Guillon and Olivier Lempereur, architects, for entrepreneur Lisa Domenico Brooke. Her work included sourcing vintage furnishings and decorative objects from Europe and the United States, selecting fabrics and wallcoverings, and specifying outdoor furniture

Baird designed the interiors of an Upper East Side apartment for the founder of HestiaLiving Everyday. Featured in Cottages & Gardens in June 2026, the project incorporated pink marble door casings, custom cabinetry, vintage furnishings, and contemporary art. Baird also designed a floor-to-ceiling bar and an upholstered dining bench to accommodate seating within the apartment's limited space.

Baird's residential work includes a home in Vail, Colorado, discussed in a November 2025 interview with Mountain Living. The design incorporated distinct areas for shared activities and privacy, using textured fabrics and color to complement the building's wood-and-stone architecture.

On Central Park West in Manhattan, Baird renovated a three-bedroom apartment with French-inspired interiors, contemporary furnishings, and antiques sourced in Europe. The project included reconfiguring the existing dining room to create a separate den and was featured in Cottages & Gardens in November 2023.

Baird designed a West Village apartment for a young couple, featured in Cottages & Gardens in April 2023. The interiors combined a neutral palette and mid-century modern furnishings with the apartment's exposed concrete ceilings, large windows, and irregular floor plan.

In Montecito, California, Baird designed the interiors of Pabellón, a vacation home overlooking the ocean and Channel Islands. Her design responded to the building's cathedral ceilings and stone, wood, and plaster finishes with neutral furnishings and spaces arranged for entertaining and indoor–outdoor living. The project was in and on the cover of Luxe Interiors + Design in April 2023.

In Williamstown, Massachusetts, Baird collaborated with architect David Scott Parker on a vacation home featured in Galerie in September 2022. The interiors combined contemporary furnishings and the clients' art collection with architectural materials including bleached walnut, white oak, stone, and blackened steel.

Baird worked with Andrea and John Stark, of Stark Carpet, on the interiors of their Hamptons home, a modern barn-style house purchased in 2018. Featured in Elle Decor in August 2021, the project incorporated contemporary art, collectible furnishings, and textiles.

== Books ==
Baird has authored books on interior design and French interiors and has contributed to broader publications about residential decoration. Her published books include:

- Bringing Paris Home. New York: The Monacelli Press, 2008. ISBN 9781580932059
- The New French Interior. New York: The Monacelli Press, 2011. ISBN 9781580933100
- Dreamhouse. New York: The Monacelli Press, 2015. ISBN 9781580933711
- Interior Design Master Class: 100 Lessons from America's Finest Designers on the Art of Decoration. New York: Rizzoli, 2016. ISBN 9780847848904
- Interiors: The Greatest Rooms of the Century. London: Phaidon Press, 2019. ISBN 9780714879802
- On Interior Design. Images Publishing, 2019. ISBN 9781864707847
- PowerHouse (with foreword by Ralph Pucci). Schiffer Publications, September 2025 ISBN 9780764369803
