= Penny (restaurant) =

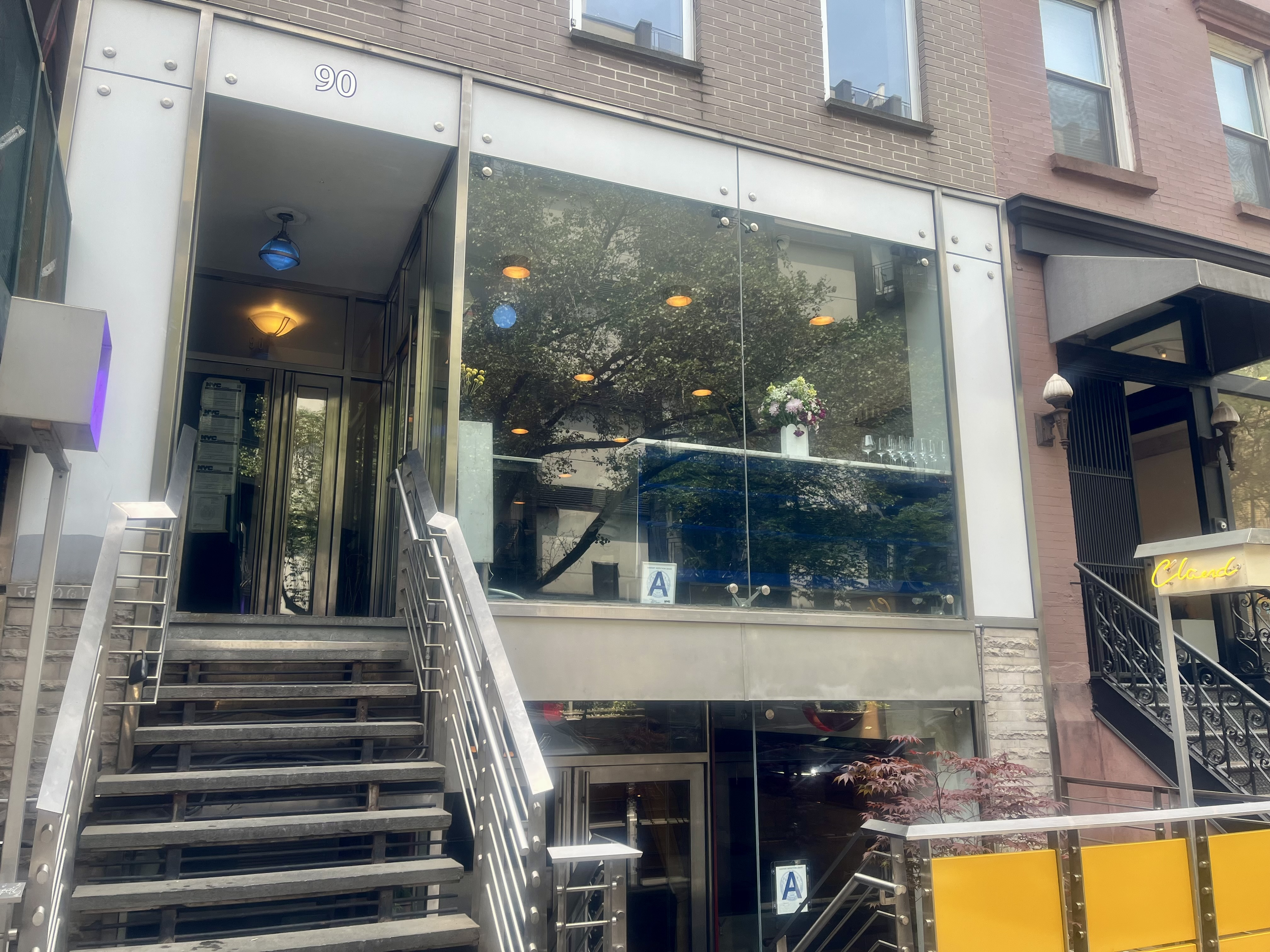
- The restaurant's exterior in 2025
- Interactive map of Penny

Restaurant information
- Food type: Seafood
- Location: 90 East 10th Street, New York, New York, 10003, United States
- Coordinates: 40°43′51″N 73°59′23″W

Penny is a seafood restaurant in New York City. Joshua Pinsky and Chase Sinzer opened Penny in March 2024. The restaurant is located above Claud, a restaurant also run by Pinsky and Sinzer.

The restaurant was included on the New York Times's 2024 list of its staff's 50 favorite American restaurants.
