= Penny Johnes =

British environmental scientist

Penny J. Johnes
- Education: University of Oxford; University of Plymouth
- Scientific career
- Workplaces: University of Bristol; University of Liverpool; University of Reading
- Thesis: An investigation of the effects of land use upon water quality in the Windrush catchment (1990)

Penny Johnes is a British environmental scientist who is a professor of biogeochemistry at the University of Bristol. Her work focuses on the biogeochemistry of aquatic systems and the effects of food production and environmental change on inland and coastal water quality. She has advised the UK Government and intergovernmental organisations on nutrient enrichment in aquatic environments and its ecological consequences. She served as Chair of the Department for Environment, Food and Rural Affairs Water Expert Advisory Group.

== Early life and education ==
Johnes earned a BSc in Environmental Science at the University of Plymouth in 1986. She completed her doctorate at the University of Oxford in 1990, where she studied the effects of land use on water quality. Her doctoral research, funded by the Natural Environment Research Council, examined the effects of agricultural practices on water quality in lowland catchments. It provided early evidence of the quantitative importance of dissolved organic and particulate nutrient fractions and the role of extreme high‑flow events in transporting particulate‑bound nutrients to water bodies. She then worked as a postdoctoral scientist at the University of Liverpool with Brian Moss, where she developed a new lake classification system for the UK, and novel understanding of nitrogen–phosphorus co‑limitation in eutrophic waters.

== Research and career ==
Johnes was appointed to the University of Reading in 1993, where she was made a Reader in Freshwater Science in 1997, and full Professor of Freshwater Science in 2002. She became director of the Aquatic Environments Research Centre and executive director of HYDRA, a research partnership linking hydrosciences researchers at universities and research institutes across the UK. She joined the University of Bristol in 2014 where her research has focused on the role of dissolved organic matter (DOM) in biodiversity loss within freshwater ecosystems, the development of integrated management approaches to address multiple environmental stressors, and the use of robust scientific evidence to inform environmental policy.

Johnes' research has explained the significance of organic and particulate nitrogen and phosphorus in total nutrient loads delivered to freshwaters from sources in their catchments, the influence of short-term extreme flow events on nutrient cycling dynamics in soils, wetlands, and freshwater systems, and the importance of defining quasi-homogeneous geoclimatic units (areas of land that share similar environmental and climatic characteristics) for scaling nutrient flux models from local to national levels. Her work has advanced knowledge of pollutant sources, transport pathways, and biogeochemical processing in freshwaters and their catchments. She has also developed a suite of advanced analytical and high‑resolution monitoring technologies to examine fine‑scale variability in nutrient fluxes and composition in complex catchment systems and within waterbodies as they flush from land to sea.

== Selected publications ==
- P M Vitousek; R Naylor; T Crews; et al. (1 June 2009). "Agriculture. Nutrient imbalances in agricultural development". Science. 324 (5934): 1519–1520. Bibcode:2009Sci...324.1519V. doi:10.1126/science.1170261. ISSN 0036-8075. PMID 19541981. Wikidata Q46460438.
- P.J. Johnes (September 1996). "Evaluation and management of the impact of land use change on the nitrogen and phosphorus load delivered to surface waters: the export coefficient modelling approach". Journal of Hydrology. 183 (3–4): 323–349. doi:10.1016/0022-1694(95)02951-6. ISSN 0022-1694. Wikidata Q58074389.
- Robert Howarth; Dennis Swaney; Gilles Billen; et al. (February 2012). "Nitrogen fluxes from the landscape are controlled by net anthropogenic nitrogen inputs and by climate". Frontiers in Ecology and the Environment. 10 (1): 37–43. doi:10.1890/100178. ISSN 1540-9295. Wikidata Q58074320.
