= Andrew-John Bethke =

South African composer, conductor and organist

Andrew-John Bethke FBS is a South African composer, conductor, organist, and musicologist.

== Biography ==
Bethke did his first degree at the University of Cape Town, and subsequently earned a master's degree in sacred music from Southern Methodist University. He later completed a doctoral degree at his alma mater, UCT, as well as a master's in theology from the University of KwaZulu-Natal. Bethke was a trainee conductor at the Cape Philharmonic Orchestra.

Bethke was the director of music and precentor at the St. Michael and St. George Cathedral in Grahamstown as well as being the conductor of the Rhodes University Chamber Choir. He was previously a lecturer at the College of the Transfiguration.

He currently works at the School of Arts, University of KwaZulu-Natal. Bethke does research in Performing Arts, Musicology and History of Religion. In 2025, he was awarded the Distinguished Teachers' Award from that university.

== Publications ==
- "The Roots of Anglican Music in Southern Africa: A Historical Survey of Anglican Music in the Cape". Anglican and Episcopal History. 83 (1): 1–19. March 2014.
- "History of Hymns: "Tis Finished! The Messiah Dies"". Discipleship Ministries. General Board of Discipleship, The United Methodist Church.
- "A Breath of Fresh Air: Some Thoughts on the Future of the Christian Church in Southern Africa Today". Anglican Theological Review. 97 (2). Spring 2015. doi:10.1177/000332861509700230. S2CID 160907209. Archived from the original on 7 October 2015 – via Questia.
- Celebrating the Seasons: Themes and Symbols of the Christian Year. Anglican Church of Southern Africa. 2015.
- "Music in the South African Anglican Diocese of Cape Town from 1900 to the Present: Toward a History of Anglican Music in the Anglican Church of Southern Africa". Yale Journal of Music & Religion. 2 (1). 2016. doi:10.17132/2377-231X.1006. ISSN 2377-231X.

== Compositions ==
His compositions include:

- In tender contemplation, premiered at the London Festival of Contemporary Church Music on 10 May 2015.
- Sing, O heavens, an entrant in the King James Bible Composition Competition.

== Awards ==
Bethke was a recipient of the Cape Organ Guild Barrow-Dowling Scholarship in 2004.
