= Penny Lane Mall =

Mall that operated in Alberta, Canada from 1973 to 2006

The Penny Lane Mall operated from 1973 until 2006 in a block of renovated buildings in downtown Calgary Alberta.

In 1973 the Penny Lane Mall was built in downtown Calgary, Alberta, preserving the facade of a block of older buildings on 8th Avenue SW. According to The Calgary Herald the mall preserved the facade of one of Calgary's first hospitals, the first Colonel Belcher Hospital, a military hospital opened in 1918. The Calgary Herald reported shoppers would be surrounded by "an atmosphere of quality and elegance".

In 1983 The Calgary Herald's Tom Keyser profiled Bob Hutchison, the mall's long-time shoe-shine-boy -- one of only three individuals who still operated a shoe-shine stand in Calgary. Hutchison said the mall's management considered him a "drawing card", so he was charged no rent.

In 1985 Eaton's opened a large department store across the street from the mall. The Calgary Herald reported vendors in the mall welcomed the shoppers the Eaton's store would attract.

According to the 2002 edition of The Canadian Rockies: A Colourguide the Penny Lane Mall was part of an extensive blocks of properties connected by covered walkways at second floor level. The walkways, called +15 because the walkways were approximately 15 feet above street level, allowed shoppers to "cruise the malls in comfort even if the weather is frightful." The guide said, in 2002, that the walkways gave shirtsleeve access to 400 stores.

In 2006 developers planned to demolish the structure and replace it with two modern glass-clad high-rise towers. According to The Calgary Herald "The demolition marks the end of a chapter in Calgary's history." Sections of the original sandstone, and original timber beams, will be incorporated into a "historical interpretive display". According to the Calgary Heritage Initiative, heritage enthusiasts tried, and failed, to interest the city or the developers in retaining some portion of the original facade. The developers agreed to incorporate an interpretive display if the Friends of Penny Lane would stop lobbying for more ambitious preservation.

== See also ==
- Eighth Avenue Place
