= Penny J. Davies =

Scottish mathematician

Penelope Jane Davies OBE is a Scottish mathematician who in 2009 became the second female president of the Edinburgh Mathematical Society, after Elizabeth McHarg. Her research involves numerical simulation of the partial differential equations describing wave scattering and elastic stability and biomechanical modelling. She is a senior lecturer in mathematics and statistics at the University of Strathclyde.

== Education and career ==
Davies earned her Ph.D. in 1987 from Heriot-Watt University under the supervision of John MacLeod Ball; her dissertation was Stability problems in nonlinear elasticity. She was on the staff of the University of Dundee before moving to the University of Strathclyde.

She was the President of the Edinburgh Mathematical Society from 2009 to 2011.

== Recognition ==
Davies was made an Officer of the Order of the British Empire "for services to mathematics" in the 2014 Birthday Honours.
