= Malcolm Penny =

British zoologist

Malcolm J. Penny is a British zoologist who is known for his ornithological field work on Aldabra and the Seychelles. In 1964 he graduated in zoology at the University of Bristol. From 1964 to 1965 he led the Bristol University Seychelles Expedition in the Indian Ocean, visited Aldabra and worked on Cousin Island. Due to Penny's efforts the ICPB bought that island in 1968 and made it a protected wildlife refuge. Back in England, Penny became a conservationist with the Wildfowl and Wetlands Trust. He further made travels to Africa, India and the Arctic. Together with Constantine Walter Benson he wrote the scientific description of the Aldabra brush-warbler in 1968. Since 1994 he has worked as freelance writer for television companies like the BBC, the ZDF, or the ORF and he has also contributed to the Discovering Nature and Animal Kingdom wildlife book series for children.

== Bibliography (selected works) ==
- 1974: The Birds of the Seychelles and the Outlying Islands
- 1991: Rhinos
- 1997: The Polar Seas (Seas and Oceans)
- 1997: The Indian Ocean (Seas and Oceans)

== Filmography (selected works) ==
- 1998: Two Worlds (13 episodes)
- 1998: African Wilderness
- 1998: A Century of Terrorism
- 1999: Africa from the Ground Up (13 episodes)
- 1999: Messengers of the Spirits
- 2001: Cry of the Wolves
