= Frederick Penney =

Frederick Penney FRSE (1816–1869) was a 19th-century Scottish chemist and forensic scientist.

== Life ==
He was born in London on 10 April 1816, the third son of Charles Penney, a wholesale stationer. He had a deformity of the spine caused by an injury from his youth.

He studied chemistry at the Royal Institution under Michael Faraday. He served an apprenticeship under Henry Hennell at Apothecaries' Hall, London 1833 to 1838 then went to Giessen University in central Germany where he obtained a doctorate (PhD) in 1839. Then, on the recommendation of Thomas Graham he was appointed Professor of Chemistry at Anderson's College in Glasgow. He also worked as an analytical chemist in Glasgow, his work including analysis of the water in Loch Katrine in determining it as a water supply for the city.

In 1856, he was elected a Fellow of the Royal Society of Edinburgh. His proposer was George Wilson.

He was an expert forensic witness in several famous murders where poison was suspected, including Madeleine Smith (1857) and Dr Edward William Pritchard (1865). His pay as a consultant was an immense £6000 per annum in his consultancy.

He lived at 44 Windsor Terrace in Glasgow.

He died in Glasgow on 22 November 1869.

== Family ==
He married Miss Perry and had two daughters, one possibly from a previous relationship.
