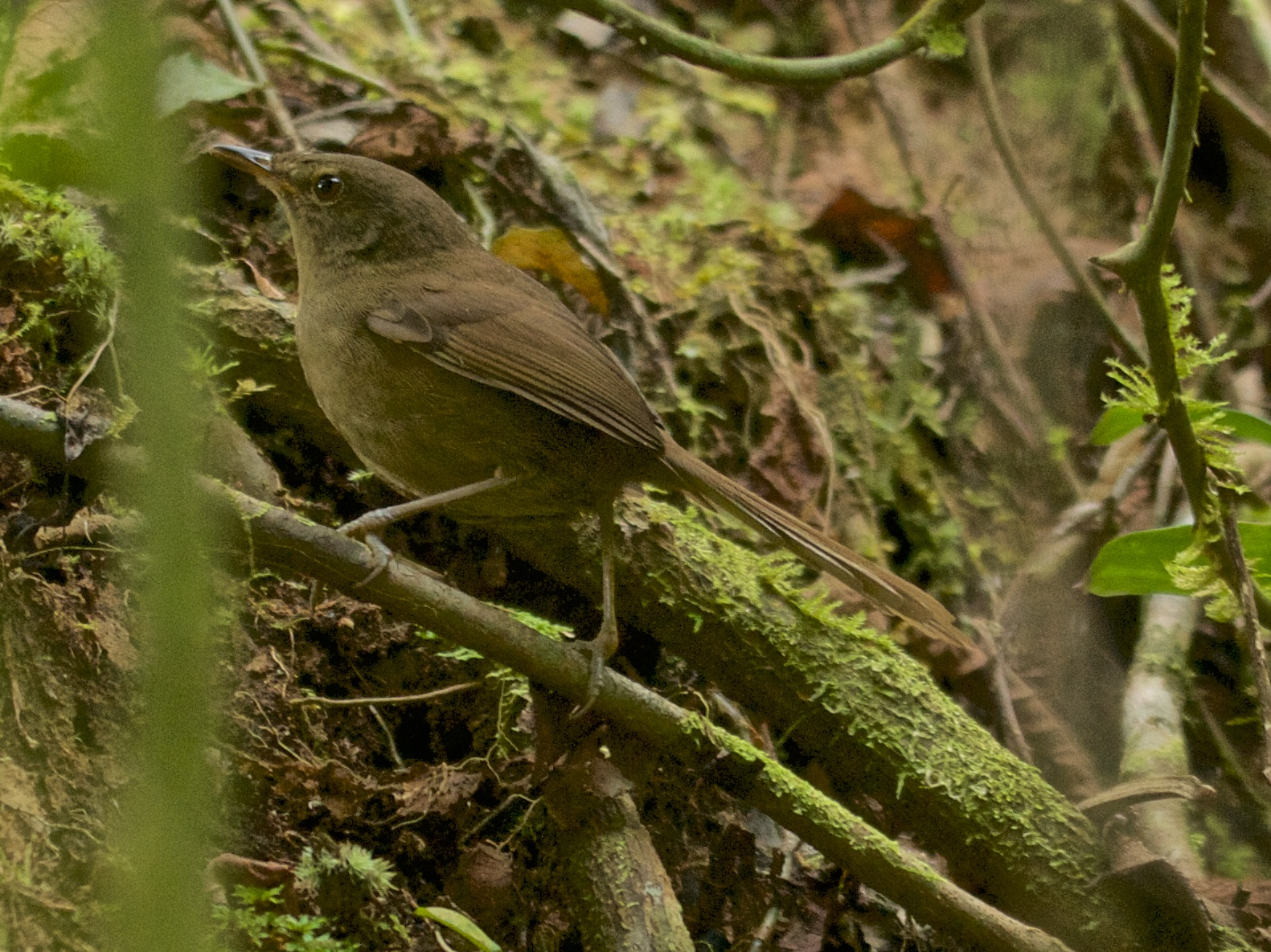
- At Analamazaotra Reserve
- On Anjouan, Comoros

Conservation status
- Least Concern (IUCN 3.1)

Scientific classification
- Kingdom: Animalia
- Phylum: Chordata
- Class: Aves
- Order: Passeriformes
- Family: Acrocephalidae
- Genus: Nesillas
- Species: N. typica

Binomial name
- Nesillas typica (Hartlaub, 1860)

Subspecies
- N. t. moheliensis - Benson, 1960; N. t. obscura - Delacour, 1931; N. t. ellisii - (Schlegel & Pollen, 1868); N. t. typica - (Hartlaub, 1860)
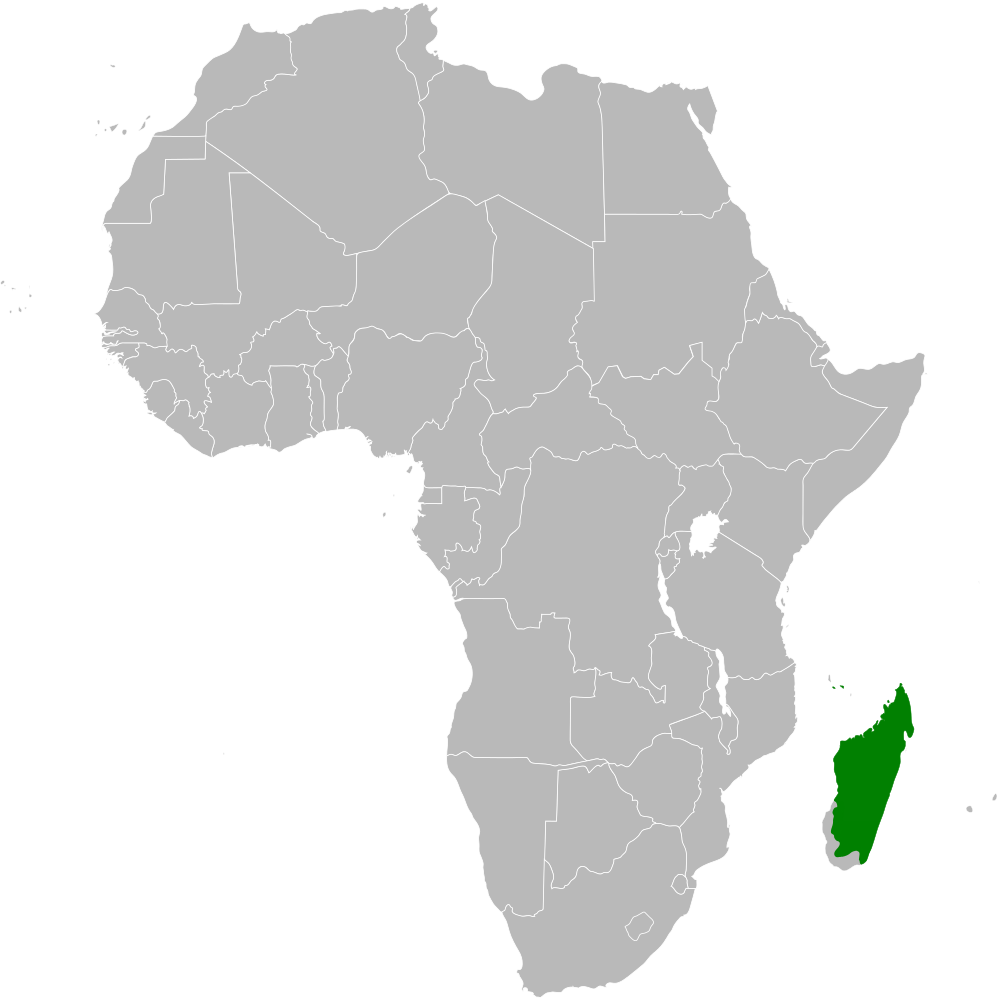
- Distribution of Malagasy Brush Warbler Resident

= Malagasy brush warbler =

Species of bird

The Malagasy brush warbler (Nesillas typica), also known as the Madagascar brush warbler, is a species of Old World warbler in the family Acrocephalidae. The Malagasy brush warbler is a widespread species of forest undergrowth and is found primarily in both Madagascar and the Comoro Islands. The bird is typically found alone or in pairs of 2 and flies short distances due to a small wingspan. Its natural habitats are subtropical or tropical dry forests, subtropical or tropical moist lowland forests, and subtropical or tropical moist shrubland.

== Appearance ==
The Malagasy brush warbler is brown with contrastingly white eyebrows. Nesillas typica is an example of the genus, which is a category that ranks above species and below family. The bird has a sleek and slim body, low forehead and crown (raised to form a slight crest), and shorter sized bird. The Malagasy brush warbler's wings are short and rounded. Males' wing spans range from 62-70mm while females range from 58-67mm. The tails are long and graduated: males range from 72-93mm while females are 67-83mm. In relation to the rest of its body, its bill is long and brown with the forehead and crown being relatively low.

== Diet ==
The Malagasy brush warbler scavenges for food low to the ground in bushes and thick shrubs. These birds walk and hop to find food. The diet of the Malagasy brush warbler includes insects such as spiders, cockroaches, beetles, tree bugs, bees, and other tree/bush insects in Madagascar. They typically fly from bushes to sticks 3m or less to the ground or sometimes hop on sticks and bushes on the ground. The Malagasy brush warbler eats alone or in pairs of 2 for a vast majority of the time when searching for food.

== Nest ==
The birds' nests in Madagascar are built 0.2-0.6 meters above the ground in a thick bush or grass tuft. Nests are made of woven dry grasses and lined with a softer material such as flower petals. Small twigs and threads from caterpillar cocoons are added to the outside of the nest as well. Nests found in Madagascar are 110 millimeters wide by 110 millimeters deep while nests on Anjouan have an external width dimension of 80-90 millimeters. The bird's clutch size is two eggs per nest.

In Eastern Madagascar, the Malagasy brush warbler breeds from the months of July to December, primarily from September to November. On the island of Mohéli, the breeding season lasts from September to January. This is dependent on the males' breeding conditions in September and can impact the breeding season of the Malagasy brush warbler.

== Distribution and habitat ==
The Malagasy brush warbler is distributed in eastern and northern Madagascar and the Comoro Islands. They inhabit the primary and degraded forests of Madagascar on calcareous substrates and gardens at all elevations. In the Comoro Islands, the bird is exclusively found in forested ridges above 400 meters among the dense evergreens of Mohéli. They are also found in a variety of habitats on the neighboring island of Anjouan in the dense undergrowth of forests, plantations, coastal thickets, and wetlands.

== Gallery ==
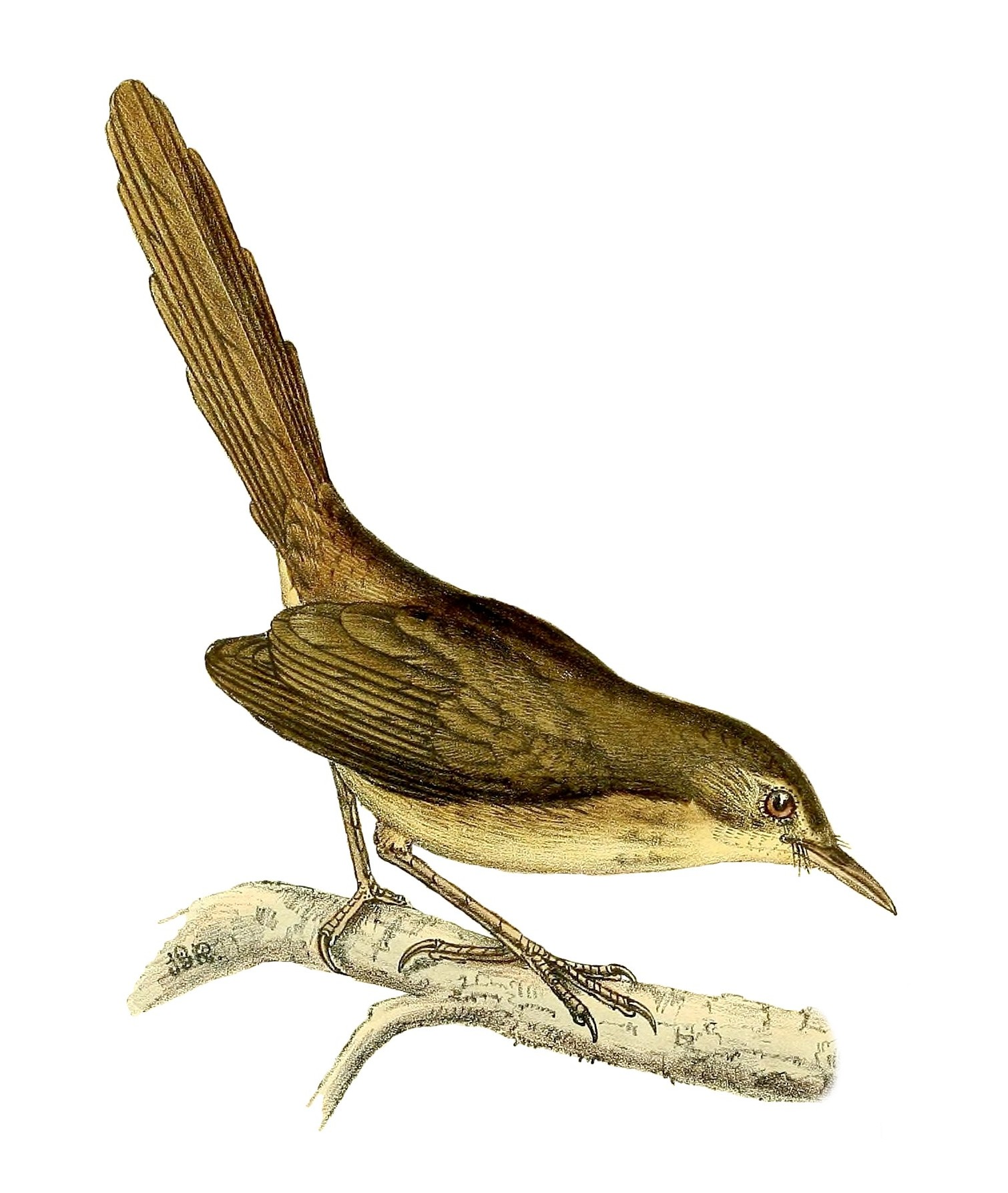
Illustration by Keulemans

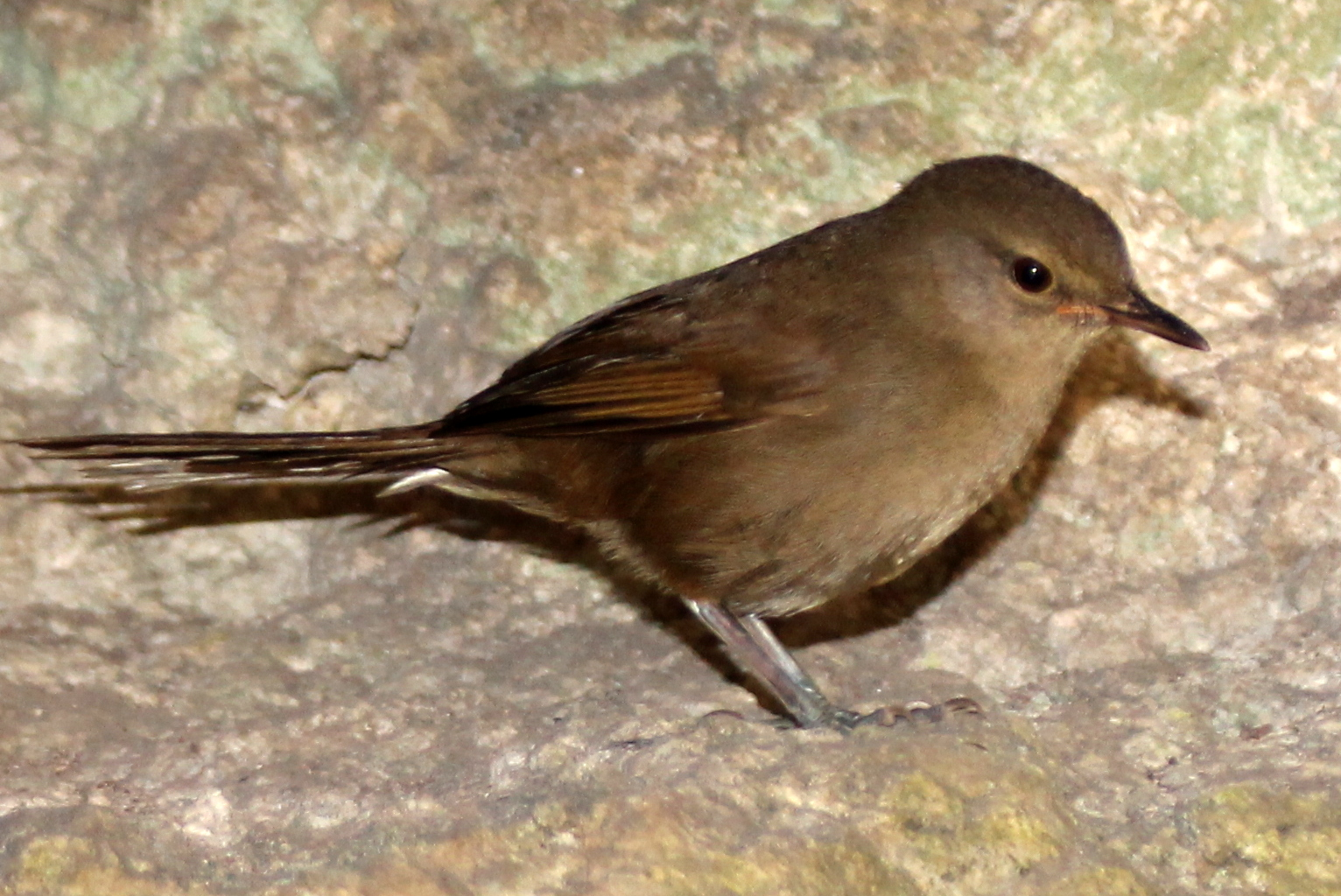
At Isalo National Park

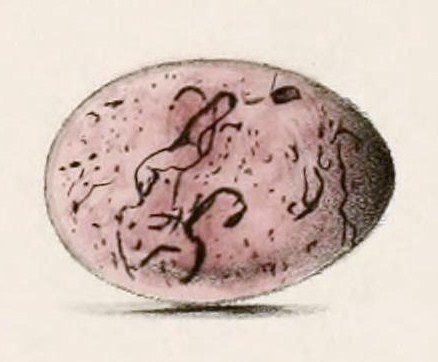
Illustration of egg by Hewitson
