= Pen-y-lan, Ceredigion =

Village in Ceredigion, Wales

Coordinates: 52.064023°N 4.573812°W

Pen-y-lan
- Location within Ceredigion
- OS grid reference: SN 2366 4375
  - Cardiff: 72.1 mi (116.0 km)
  - London: 193.9 mi (312.1 km)
- Community: Beulah
- Principal area: Ceredigion
- Country: Wales
- Sovereign state: United Kingdom
- Post town: Cardigan
- Postcode district: SA43
- Police: Dyfed-Powys
- Fire: Mid and West Wales
- Ambulance: Welsh
- UK Parliament: Ceredigion Preseli
- Senedd Cymru – Welsh Parliament: Ceredigion

Pen-y-lan is a hamlet in the community of Beulah, Ceredigion, Wales, which is 72.1 miles (116.1 km) from Cardiff and 193.9 miles (312 km) from London. Pen-y-lan is represented in the Senedd by Elin Jones (Plaid Cymru) and is part of the Ceredigion Preseli constituency in the House of Commons.

== See also ==
- List of localities in Wales by population
