= Penny Gordon-Larsen =

American professor of nutrition

- Education: Tulane University; University of Pennsylvania; University of North Carolina at Chapel Hill
- Scientific career
- Fields: Nutritional science
- Workplaces: UNC Gillings School of Global Public Health

Penny Gordon-Larsen is an obesity researcher. In July 2023, she was named Vice Chancellor for Research at the University of North Carolina at Chapel Hill after serving as Interim Vice Chancellor for Research from March 2022. She is the Carla Smith Chamblee Distinguished Professor of Global Nutrition at the UNC Gillings School of Global Public Health, where she served as associate dean for research from 2018 to 2022, and was also named a William R. Kenan Jr. Distinguished Professor on Sept. 1, 2023. She is also a Faculty Fellow at the Carolina Population Center. Dr. Gordon-Larsen's NIH-funded research portfolio focuses on individual-, household-, and community-level susceptibility to obesity and its cardiometabolic consequences, and her work ranges from molecular and genetic to environmental and societal-level factors. She was the 2015 president of The Obesity Society and a member of the National Institute of Diabetes and Digestive and Kidney Diseases Clinical Obesity Research Panel (CORP).

== Education ==
Gordon-Larsen completed a Bachelor of Arts in anthropology and psychology from Tulane University in 1989. She earned a Ph.D. in human biology from University of Pennsylvania in 1997. She completed postdoctoral training in nutritional epidemiology at University of North Carolina at Chapel Hill.

== Career ==
Much of her research focuses on issues related to ethnicity, disparities and development of obesity over the lifecycle, with attention to pathways linking environment and behavior to cardiometabolic risk. She has published on obesity as a multifactorial disease, neighborhood factors, and trends in obesity. Her newest collaborative research is a large collaborative project with 27 faculty from 16 departments, six schools, and five centers and institutes. The project focuses on understanding why two people who consume the same diets and exercise equally can have very different susceptibility to weight gain, with the aim of developing treatment approaches that go far beyond the "one-size-fits-all" approach that is so common. In November 2018, Gordon-Larsen was appointed the University of North Carolina Gillings School of Global Public Health's Associate Dean for Research as she stepped down as chair of the NIH Kidney, Nutrition, Obesity and Diabetes study section.

As the Carla Smith Chamblee Distinguished Professor of Global Nutrition, Gordon-Larsen led the Obesity Creativity Hub (Heterogeneity in Obesity Creativity Hub) "to bring researchers together to solve major societal problems." She also served on the NIDDK Advisory Council.

== Personal life ==
Gordon-Larsen has two children and enjoys hiking in her free time.
