= Penny, Pike County, Kentucky =

Unincorporated community in Kentucky, United States

Penny, Kentucky
- Unincorporated community
- Location within Kentucky
- Coordinates: 37°21′33″N 82°33′42″W
- Country: United States
- State: Kentucky
- County: Pike
- Elevation: 794 ft (242 m)
- Time zone: UTC-5 (Eastern (EST))
  - Summer (DST): UTC-4 (EDT)
- GNIS feature ID: 500389

Penny is an unincorporated community in Pike County, Kentucky, United States. Their post office is closed.
