= Penny M. Kris-Etherton =

American dietitian

- Spouse: Terry Etherton

Academic background
- Education: BSc, Medical Dietetics, 1971, Rochester Institute of Technology; MS, Nutrition, Case Western Reserve University; PhD, 1991, University of Minnesota
- Thesis: n-3 Fatty Acids: Food or Supplements?

Academic work
- Institutions: Pennsylvania State University

Penny Margaret Kris-Etherton is an American dietitian. She is the Evan Pugh University Professor of Nutritional Sciences and Distinguished Professor of Nutrition at Pennsylvania State University.

== Early life and education ==
Kris-Etherton completed her Bachelor of Science degree at Rochester Institute of Technology before enrolling at Case Western Reserve University for her Master of Science degree. She concluded her post-secondary education at the University of Minnesota. In 1987, Kris-Etherton was recognized by Case Western as an Outstanding Alumni. In 2017, Kris-Etherton was recognized as a Distinguished Alumna by the Rochester Institute of Technology.

== Career ==
Following her Master of Science degree and dietetic internship at the Veterans Administration Hospital in Cleveland, Ohio, Kris-Etherton accepted a faculty position at Pennsylvania State University in 1979. At Penn State, Kris-Etherton focused her research on improving health and decreasing the risk of many chronic diseases. As such, she served in various leadership positions on academic boards across the country including as a member and chair of the Council on Education of ADA's Division of Education Standards. In 1984, Kris-Etherton was appointed to serve a three-year term on the American Heart Association's Nutrition Task Force for Pennsylvania to identify the needs of local residents for education on the relationship between nutrition and heart disease. She also served on the Dietary Reference Intakes for Macronutrients Lipid Panel in the Institute of Medicine of the National Academy of Sciences and sat on the National Institutes of Health Committee on the Women's Health Initiative.

Early in her career, Kris-Etherton was awarded the Sports, Cardiovascular, and Wellness Nutritionists (SCAN) Achievement Award for serving as the first author on both the 1990 and 1998 editions of the SCAN cardiovascular manuals. During the Presidency of George W. Bush, Kris-Etherton was selected to sit on the national nutritional board as a consultant to Campbell's and Procter & Gamble. While serving on the national nutritional board in 2003, activists called for the removal of Kris-Etherton and Connie M. Weaver for allegedly accepting money from food processors and farm groups.

As a result of her research and academic achievements, Kris-Etherton received the 2005 Elaine R. Monsen Award for Outstanding Research Literature. Two years later, she was awarded the 2007 Marjorie Hulsizer Copher in recognition of "outstanding accomplishment and service to both ADA and the profession of dietetics." As a Distinguished Professor of Nutrition, Kris-Etherton was named the recipient of the 2018 W. Virgil Brown Distinguished Achievement Award and Lectureship from the National Lipid Association and the Foundation of the National Lipid Association.

In 2020, Kris-Etherton was appointed an Evan Pugh University Professor of Nutritional Sciences, the university's highest faculty honor. At the same time, two of her former students established the Penny M. Kris-Etherton Doctoral Award Fund to assist doctoral students who were pursuing their doctoral degrees in nutritional sciences.

== Personal life ==
Kris-Etherton is married to Terry Etherton, the head of Penn State's Department of Animal Science.
