= Popi (disambiguation) =

Popi is a 1969 film.

Popi may also refer to:

== People ==
- Popi Malliotaki (born 1971), Greek pop-folk singer
- Cristiano Minellono (born 1946), also known as Popi Minellano, Italian songwriter and actor
- Popi Seniloli (1883–1936), Fijian chief and politician
- Parthena Popi Tsapanidou, 21st century Greek politician and journalist
- Eno Popi (born 1981), Albanian television presenter, radio host, journalist and lecturer
- Ryota Asano (born 1979), Japanese rugby union player nicknamed "Popi"
- James Pope (educationalist) (1837–1913), New Zealand teacher, school inspector, educationalist, amateur astronomer and writer known as "Te Popi"

== Other uses ==
- Popi (TV series), a 1976 American sitcom derived from the film
- Popi, birthplace (village) of Isaiah of Onogošt, 16th-17th century Serbian Orthodox saint, monk and ascetic

== See also ==
- Protection of Personal Information Act, 2013, South African legislation also known as the PoPI Act
- the title character of Popee the Performer, a Japanese children's anime series
