= Penny Asbell =

American ophthalmologist

- Born: New York

Academic background
- Education: BA, 1968, University of Chicago; M.D., 1975, State University of New York at Buffalo; MBA, 1998, Zicklin School of Business

Academic work
- Institutions: University of Tennessee Health Science Center; Icahn School of Medicine at Mount Sinai

Penny A. Asbell is an American ophthalmologist. As of 2018, she is the Barrett G. Haik Endowed Chair at the University of Tennessee Health Science Center (UTHSC) where she focuses her research on the treatment of dry eye syndrome.

== Early life and education ==
Asbell earned her Bachelor of Arts degree from the University of Chicago and her Medical Degree from the State University of New York at Buffalo. Upon graduating from medical school, she completed her post-doctoral studies in internal medicine at Yale University before being encouraged by her brother to study ophthalmology at New York University Medical Center. She enjoyed the subject and pursued medical fellowships at New York University and cornea study at Louisiana State University Eye Center before earning her MBA from the Zicklin School of Business.

== Career ==
Upon completing her medical residency, Asbell joined the faculty at the Icahn School of Medicine at Mount Sinai as a professor of Ophthalmology. During her tenure at the institution, she established the Cornea Clinical and Research Fellowships and served as its director. Asbell also conducted research into the effectiveness of eye vitamins while serving as Editor‐in‐Chief of the Mount Sinai Journal of Medicine. In 2014, Asbell led a research team to train residents and surgeons in Myanmar on various corneal surgical techniques.

In June 2018, Asbell was named the Barrett G. Haik Endowed Chair for Ophthalmology in the College of Medicine and Director of the Hamilton Eye Institute at the University of Tennessee Health Science Center. While serving in this role, she led the DRy Eye Assessment and Management (DREAM) study to assess how effective oral omega-3 fatty acid supplementations were on treatment for moderate-to-severe dry eye disease. The one-year study assigned 535 patients, who suffered from a moderate-to-severe dry eye disorder, to use 3,000 mg omega-3 fatty acids or placebo daily. Her research team concluded that "the difference between groups was not statistically significant" and "there were also no statistically significant differences between treatment groups in secondary outcome measures analyzing compliance with the study treatment protocol." In the month following her promotion, Asbell was also appointed to the Wize Pharma Inc, a clinical-stage biopharmaceutical company, Advisory Board. As Director of the Hamilton Eye Institute, Asbell led a rural mission trip to San José de los Llanos in September to assist locals who struggle with blindness and cataracts. During the trip, her team (which included her daughter) conducted 100 eye surgeries at the Hospital Municipal Dr. Pedro Maria Santana and assisted over 350 patients.
