= Penny Bethke =

Penny (Penelope Anne) Bethke (1950–2011) was a senior manager in the Ontario co-operative sector, a community leader, and a social activist. Serving in a range of positions on the management and boards of a number of credit union, co-operative and labour organizations between 1975 and 2011, it has been said that Bethke was responsible for tens of thousands of people living in co-operative housing, for numerous initiatives on social responsibility, and for inspiring a generation of young people in the co-operative movement.

In addition to acting as a business leader and manager in a number of corporate capacities, Bethke's work frequently concentrated on initiatives related to helping the less fortunate. She was one of the prime instigators and promoters of the practice of social auditing in Canada, and played a driving role in implementing social audits conducted by Metro Credit Union. She instigated and supported a range of projects related to social responsibility including Learn$ave (a research project to help low income people save to go back to school or start a new small business), low-income lending programs at her Credit Union, co-op housing designed to benefit low income sectors of the population, and her local health clinic, Parkdale Community Health Centre. She worked on a range of women's and antipoverty issues including helping to establish shelters and long-term housing for assaulted women.

Bethke chaired several task forces at Metro Credit Union including one titled "Serving the Underserved", and two subsequent task forces on accountability reporting. She played a volunteer role with the GTA Community Loan Fund and its successor, which provided micro credit loans to new entrepreneurs, and chaired its Lending Committee. She also gained some recognition as chair of the Gary Gillam Award for Social Responsibility, jointly sponsored by Alterna Savings and Central 1 Credit Union. She was active in numerous political campaigns at the municipal, provincial and federal levels.

Tom Clement, executive director of the Co-operative Housing Federation of Toronto Inc. wrote that "co-op housing in Ontario ... grew faster under her leadership then at any other time in the movement's history. Thousands of people live in co-op housing throughout Ontario because of Penny's hard work and dedication."

A statement from the Board of the Campus Co-op Residence Inc. said, "She shaped Campus Co-op by engaging with staff, board members and membership in ways that allowed us to collectively and individually grow and flourish. Her patience and joy in teaching and explaining were legendary."

Among the most significant professional positions held by Bethke were the following:

- President and Vice President, Co-operative Housing Federation Ontario Region, with several cross-appointments to other housing and co-op organizations
- Executive Director, the Labour Council Development Foundation
- Director, Alterna Savings and Credit Union (formerly Metro Credit Union)
- Alumna Board member and General Manager, Campus Co-op Residence Inc.

In a tribute to Bethke, Sophia Fin, President of Campus Co-op Residences wrote: "Penny used her extensive experience to teach leaders. ... We will always remember Penny for the important life lessons she taught us: be passionate in your work, do your very best at your tasks, be creative, walk a mile in the shoes of others (particularly those less fortunate), commit to lifelong education, respect the environment and conduct yourself in everything you do with the utmost integrity. Also, understand and use Robert’s Rules, and take in the Film Festival every year."

She held an M.S.W. in Community Development and Planning from the University of Toronto.

Bethke died on June 11, 2011, at the age of 60 due to complications associated with cancer. On July 29, 2011, she was selected to receive the Co-operative Spirit Award from the Ontario Co-operative Association. The award was presented posthumously at the Annual Co-op Conference and Gala organized by the Ontario Co-operative Association (On Co-op) on Oct. 19 at the Burlington, Ontario Royal Botanical Gardens.
