= Penney =

- Coat of Arms

Origin
- Meaning: "coin"
- Region of origin: Britain

Other names
- Variant forms: Penny, Pennie, Penne, Pyne, Pynne

Penney (also spelled Penny) is a common surname of British origin.

The name Penney dates from the ancient Anglo-Saxon culture of Britain. It was derived from the Old English "Penig," denoting a coin (cognate with German "Pfennig"). The penny was the only unit of coinage in England until the early 14th century; as such, it was a coin of considerable value.

The name was first found in Northampton where they held a family seat from very early times; before the 12th century had become associated with London; later moved north into Scotland and west into Ireland settling mostly in the provinces of Ulster and Munster.

Some of the first settlers of this name or some of its variants were: George Penny who settled in the Barbados in 1635; William Penny settled on Eastern Long Island prior to 1740; Charles Penny settled in Maryland in 1775; P. Penny settled in Boston, Massachusetts in 1769; the family also settled in Pennsylvania in the 18th century. In Newfoundland, Benedict Penny inherited property in Carbonear which dated back to 1699.

Spelling variations include: Penny, Penney, Pennie, Penne, Pyne, Pynne and others.

== Surname ==
- Alphonsus Liguori Penney (1924-2017) Canadian archbishop
- Darby Penney (1952–2021), American writer, activist
- David Penney (born 1964), English football player/manager
- James Cash Penney (1875–1971), American businessman, founder of JCPenney
- Kirk Penney (born 1980), New Zealand basketball player
- Richard Penney (1814–1844), doctor befriended Aboriginals in Australia
- Roger Penney, American singer, songwriter and multi-instrumentalist
- Stef Penney (born 1969), Scottish novelist and filmmaker
- Steve Penney (ice hockey) (born 1961), with Winnipeg Jets and Montreal Canadiens
- Frederick Penney (1816–1869), Scottish chemist
- Steve Penney (footballer) (born 1964), Irish Footballer, played in the 1986 World Cup
- Trevor Penney (born 1968), English cricket coach and player
- William George Penney (1909–1991), British physicist with the Manhattan Project

== See also ==
- List of Old English (Anglo-Saxon) surnames
- Penny (disambiguation)
