= Penny Lane (model) =

English fashion model (born 1994)

- Born: Penelope Elizabeth Lane; 13 December 1994 (age 31); Cheshire, England
- Occupations: Model; actress
- Years active: 2014‍–‍present
- Modeling information
- Height: 180 cm (5 ft 11 in)

Penelope Elizabeth Lane (born 13 December 1994) is an English fashion model known for co-winning the 2023 Sports Illustrated Swimsuit Model Search, and being named the magazine's Rookie of the Year in 2024. Apart from her modelling interests, she has done acting, featuring as the bodyguard of Lex Luthor in film Justice League (2017). Lane appeared as a bride in the music video for "Falling Back" by the Canadian artist Drake. Following her debut in the 60th edition of Sports Illustrated Swimsuit, she returned to feature in its 2025 issue. Lane has been on OutKick's Screencaps cover on multiple occasions.

== Early life and career ==
At age 16, Lane moved to London to start her career in modelling. She mentions being inspired by the likes of Kate Upton, who previously appeared on the 2013 cover of the swimsuit magazine.

Lane has been outspoken about women's mental health in the modelling industry. The industry demanded that she lose weight and even consider a breast reduction. She has spoken about how the pressure led to the loss of her menstrual cycle, potentially affecting her fertility.
