= Penny (unit) =

Unit of length of a nail, US and obsolete UK

In the United States, the length of a nail is designated by its penny size, written with a number and the abbreviation d for penny; for example, 10d for a ten-penny nail. A larger number indicates a longer nail. Diameter of the nail also varies based on penny size, depending on nail type. Nails under 1 1/4 inch, often called brads, are sold mostly in small packages with only a length designation or with length and wire gauge designations; for example, 1″ 18 ga. or 3/4″ 16 ga.

Penny sizes originally referred to the price for a hundred (100) or long hundred (120) nails in England in the 15th century: the larger the nail, the higher the cost per long hundred. The system remained in use in England into the 20th century,.

In Canada, nails are specified by the type and length and are still manufactured to Imperial dimensions. Nail diameter is specified by gauge number (British Imperial Standard). The gauge is the same as the wire diameter used in the manufacture of the nail.

The symbol d is an abbreviation for denarius, a Roman coin similar to a penny; this was the abbreviation for the monetary penny in the United Kingdom before decimalisation.

Penny size	Length (inches)	Length (nearest mm)
2d	1	25
3d	1 1/4	32
4d	1 1/2	38
5d	1 3/4	44
6d	2	51
7d	2 1/4	57
8d	2 1/2	64
9d	2 3/4	70
10d	3	76
12d	3 1/4	83
16d	3 1/2	89
20d	4	102
30d	4 1/2	114
40d	5	127
50d	5 1/2	140
60d	6	152
