= Margaret French =

American artist (1906–1998)

- Margaret French and Paul Cadmus, Fire Island, c.1941
- Born: Margaret Hoening; 1906; Hoboken, New Jersey, US
- Died: 1998 (aged 92); New York City, US
- Known for: Painting, photography PaJaMa
- Spouse: Jared French

Margaret French (nee Hoening, 1906–1998) was an American artist, best known for her photographs as part of the photo collective PaJaMa.

== Education ==
After attending Smith College, she settled in New York, where she attended a formal artistic education at the Art Students League. There she met Paul Cadmus and Jared French.

== Life and work ==
French was a magical realist painter, and also produced etchings, although her best known works were made as part of a collective, personal and professional, with Jared French and Paul Cadmus.

In 1937 she married Jared French, who had a sexual relationship with Paul Cadmus. Despite the marriage, Jared continued his relationship with Cadmus. Together the trio formed the photo collective PaJaMa, (Paul Jared Margaret).

Using Margaret's camera, they took pictures of themselves, their artist friends, and their gay acquaintances, arranging and staging their motifs on the beaches along Provincetown, for the next eight years.

Some of the people photographed were photographer George Platt Lynes, Christopher Isherwood, George Tooker, Cadmus' sister and artist Fidelma, artist Bernard Perlin and Monroe Wheeler, then director of the exhibitions at the Museum of Modern Art.

In the 1940s, she and her husband befriended E.M. Forster, who in 1947 stayed at their home while visiting New York, and spent time with them in Provincetown. Forster returned in 1949 for another visit.

French's paintings have been described as symbolic and dreamlike. She produced few known works, but her paintings show clear influences from French and Cadmus, especially the time-consuming paintings in egg tempera, which were a technique that Cadmus and Jared French also used. When Cadmus began a relationship with the young artist George Tooker in 1944, the trio became a quartet, and Tooker is featured in many of PaJaMa's photographs, such as Margaret French, George Tooker and Jared French, Nantucket, and George Tooker at 5 St. Luke’s Place with Paul Cadmus and Jared French in Mirror.

Margaret French died 1998 in New York, at the age of 92.

== Collections ==
French's work is held in several museum collections including the Smithsonian American Art Museum, the Museum of Modern Art, the Whitney Museum of American Art, the Hood Museum, the Munson Williams Proctor Art Museum among others.
