= PaJaMa =

Artistic collective, photographers

PaJaMa was an artist collective focusing on photography formed in 1937 in New York City by the American artists Paul Cadmus, Jared French and Margaret French.

During vacations in Saltaire, New York, Fire Island, and later Provincetown, Massachusetts and Nantucket, Paul Cadmus and the Frenches photographed each other on beaches and indoors, donning makeshift costumes and using found objects as props to create scenes of Magic Realism. They passed around Margaret's Leica camera, becoming subjects and makers in turn. The collective took its name from the first two letters of their first name, Pa Ja Ma.

Cadmus later explained, “After we’d been working most of the day, we’d go out late afternoons and take photographs when the light was best. They were just playthings. We would hand out these little photographs when we went to dinner parties, like playing cards.”

Along the beaches of Fire Island, Nantucket, and Martha's Vineyard, they staged various black and white photographs of themselves and their friends, both naked and clothed. Most of these people were bisexual or gay men who were among New York's young artists, dancers, and writers. Some of those who participated were Tennessee Williams, Glenway Wescott, Monroe Wheeler, Donald Windham, Todd Bolender, Bernard Perlin, Chuck Howard, Ted Starkowski, Christopher Isherwood, and Paul Cadmus' sister Fidelma and her husband Lincoln Kirstein.

Fashion photographer George Platt Lynes was another of their friends, and many of his photos with the collective have been preserved. In a series of images, 14 of which are in the Museum of Modern Art, Cadmus and French alternate between completely naked and partially clothed, with French usually the more exhibitionist of the two. When Paul Cadmus began a relationship with the artist George Tooker in 1945, the latter became part of the collective for a time, and he is featured in many of their images.

PaJaMa was dissolved in the early 1950s.
