= Francis Burton Harrison =

American-Filipino politician (1873–1957)

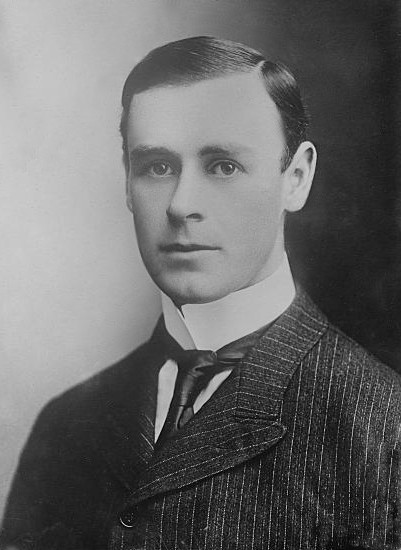
- Harrison in 1910

Governor-General of the Philippines
- In office October 6, 1913 – March 5, 1921
- President: Woodrow Wilson
- Preceded by: Newton W. Gilbert (acting)
- Succeeded by: Charles Yeater (acting)

Philippine Secretary of Interior
- Acting
- In office September 28, 1915 – March 29, 1916
- Succeeded by: Rafael Palma

Member of the U.S. House of Representatives from New York
- In office March 4, 1907 – September 3, 1913
- Preceded by: Jacob Ruppert
- Succeeded by: Jacob A. Cantor
- Constituency: 16th district (1907–13); 20th district (1913)
- In office March 4, 1903 – March 3, 1905
- Preceded by: Oliver Belmont
- Succeeded by: Herbert Parsons
- Constituency: 13th district

Personal details
- Born: Francis Burton Harrison; December 18, 1873 New York City, United States
- Died: November 21, 1957 (aged 83) Hunterdon Medical Center; Raritan Township, New Jersey, United States
- Resting place: Manila North Cemetery, Manila, Philippines
- Citizenship: American; Filipino
- Party: Democratic
- Spouse(s): Mary Crocker (m. 1900; died 1905) Mabel Judson Cox (divorced) Elizabeth Wrentmore (div. 1927) Margaret Wrentmore (divorced) Maria Teresa Larrucea (before 1956)
- Children: 4, including Barbara
- Parent(s): Burton Harrison; Constance Cary Harrison
- Education: Yale University; New York Law School

Military service
- Allegiance: United States
- Branch/service: United States Army
- Years of service: 1898–1899
- Rank: Captain
- Battles/wars: Spanish–American War

Francis Burton Harrison (December 18, 1873 – November 21, 1957) was an American-Filipino statesman who served four terms in the United States House of Representatives between 1903 and 1913 and was appointed governor-general of the Philippines by President of the United States Woodrow Wilson. Harrison was a prominent adviser to the president of the Philippine Commonwealth, as well as the next four presidents of the Republic of the Philippines. He is the only former governor-general of the Philippines to be awarded Philippine citizenship.

== Early life and military career ==
Harrison was born in New York City, to Burton Harrison, a lawyer and private secretary to Confederate President Jefferson Davis, and Constance Cary Harrison, novelist and social arbiter. Through his mother, Harrison was great-grandson of Virginia-planter, Thomas Fairfax, 9th Lord Fairfax of Cameron. Through Fairfax in birth and marriage, Harrison was also relative to United States founding fathers: Gouverneur Morris (his great-great-uncle), Thomas Jefferson, the Randolphs, the Ishams, Robert Carter I, and Confederate General Robert E. Lee.

Harrison graduated from Yale College in 1895, where he was a member of the Psi Upsilon fraternity and the secret society Skull and Bones, and from the New York Law School in 1897. From 1897 to 1899, Harrison was an instructor in the Evening Division at New York Law School. He later left to serve in United States Army during the Spanish–American War, as an assistant adjutant general with the rank of captain.

== U.S. Congress ==
A member of the Democratic Party, Harrison was elected to the 58th United States Congress, and served from March 4, 1903, to March 3, 1905. In 1904, Harrison ran unsuccessfully for lieutenant governor of New York. Afterwards, he resumed the practice of law. He was again elected to the 60th, 61st, 62nd and 63rd United States Congresses, and served from March 4, 1907, to September 3, 1913, when he resigned to become governor-general of the Philippines. His Harrison Narcotics Tax Act was eventually passed on December 17, 1914.

During his service in the Far East, Harrison was a candidate for the Democratic nomination in the 1920 presidential election. He lost the nomination to Governor of Ohio James M. Cox at the Democratic National Convention in San Francisco, who eventually lost to the Republican candidate Warren G. Harding.

== Governor-general ==
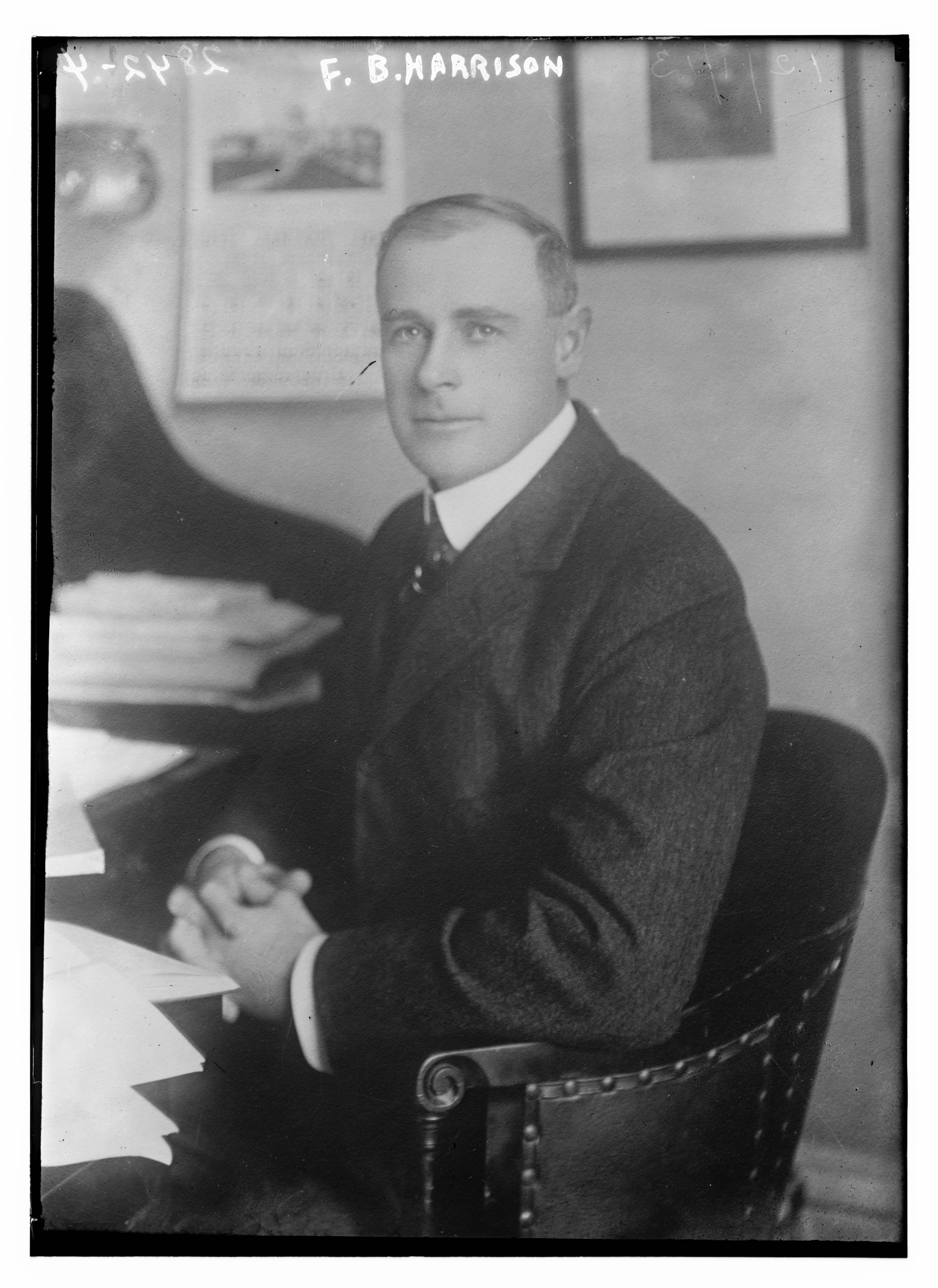
Harrison in 1913

Harrison was governor-general of the Philippines from 1913 to 1921 and advocated for and oversaw the process of Filipinization, or the transfer of authority to Filipinos in the United States territory's Insular Government to better prepare for independence. He was governor-general during the passages of the Philippine Autonomy Act, otherwise known as the Jones Act, which converted the partially elected Philippine Legislature with the appointed Philippine Commission as the upper house and the elected Philippine Assembly as the lower house, to a fully elected Philippine Legislature with the Philippine Senate replacing the now-dissolved Philippine Commission and the Philippine Assembly renamed the House of Representatives of the Philippines.

Despite the length of his tenure as governor-general, he vetoed only five bills, the least number by any American governor-general in the Philippines. His pro-Filipino stance made him a popular figure in the Philippines but also the object of criticism of conservative Americans who viewed his liberal governance as not supportive enough of U.S. interests.

Under his administration, the governor-general's Spanish-era mansion called Malacañang Palace was expanded with the construction of an executive building. When he left the Philippines, Harrison lived in Scotland until being recalled to the Philippines in 1934, during a period of transition from an unincorporated territory of the United States to the Commonwealth of the Philippines.

=== Philippine financial crisis ===
During the last four years of Harrison's administration, government cooperatives received substantial funding from the Philippine National Bank (PNB) to boost agricultural exports. By 1919, 18 new modern centers and 40 coconut oil mills were operational with US$16 million in financing. However, this led to a significant decline in the colonial gold reserve and increased currency in circulation, resulting from the PNB's generous loans.

== Political adviser ==
Manuel L. Quezon became the first president of the Commonwealth, and Harrison was asked to be Quezon's principal advisor in November 1935. He served in that capacity for ten months. In 1936, Harrison expressed interest in acquiring Filipino citizenship but did not fulfill the required years of residency under the Naturalization Law. Upon Quezon's initiative, the National Assembly passed Commonwealth Act No. 79, making him a naturalized Filipino citizen. Harrison returned to the position of advisor upon Quezon's request in May 1942, after Filipino and American troops had surrendered the Bataan Peninsula and Corregidor Island during World War II and Quezon went into exile in the United States. Harrison would serve the government-in-exile.

From November 1946 to February 1947, Harrison served as commissioner of claims in the civil service of the United States Army in Manila. He later served as an advisor to the first four presidents of the new Philippine Republic after the country's independence in 1946, serving as special adviser of foreign affairs to Manuel Roxas.

After this latest service to the Philippines, Harrison retired to Spain for six years, then chose to move to Califon, New Jersey in August 1957.

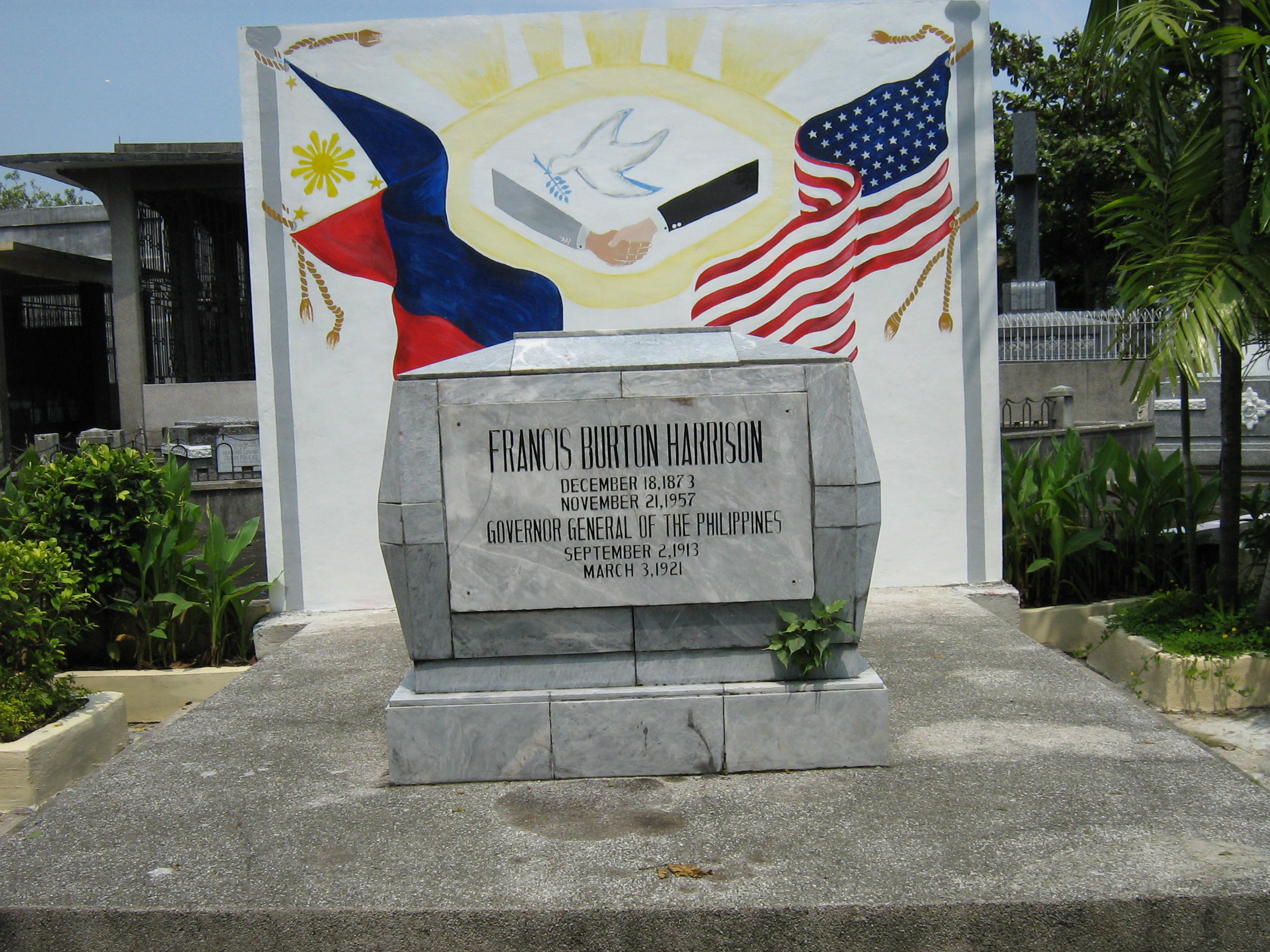
Gravesite of F.B. Harrison at the Manila North Cemetery.

== Personal life ==
Harrison's first wife was Mary Crocker, daughter of California railroad and mining magnate Charles Frederick Crocker. They were married on June 7, 1900, at St. Mary's Church in Tuxedo Park, New York. She died in 1905 in an automobile accident leaving Harrison to raise two small daughters, the elder Virginia Randolph Harrison and the younger Barbara Harrison Wescott. Harrison would marry and divorce four more times to: Mabel Judson Cox, Elizabeth Wrentmore (divorced by Wrentmore in 1927 due to abandonment), Margaret Wrentmore whom he had a son, Norvell Burton Harrison who died in an automobile accident in Tucson, AZ on April 19, 1941, at the age of 13, and Doria Lee. His only surviving son, Dr. Francis Burton "Kiko" Harrison Jr., (1921–2014), was the subject of many photographs taken between 1939 and 1942 by the PaJaMa Collective and George Platt Lynes. Kiko was a product of his third marriage. His last wife, Maria Teresa Larrucea, a young Basque woman, was born in Amorebieta (Bizkaia, Spain) and outlived Harrison.

== Death and burial ==
Harrison died on November 21, 1957, at Hunterdon Medical Center in Raritan Township near Flemington, New Jersey. He willed that he be buried in the Philippines, and he was interred in the Manila North Cemetery in Manila.

== Legacy ==
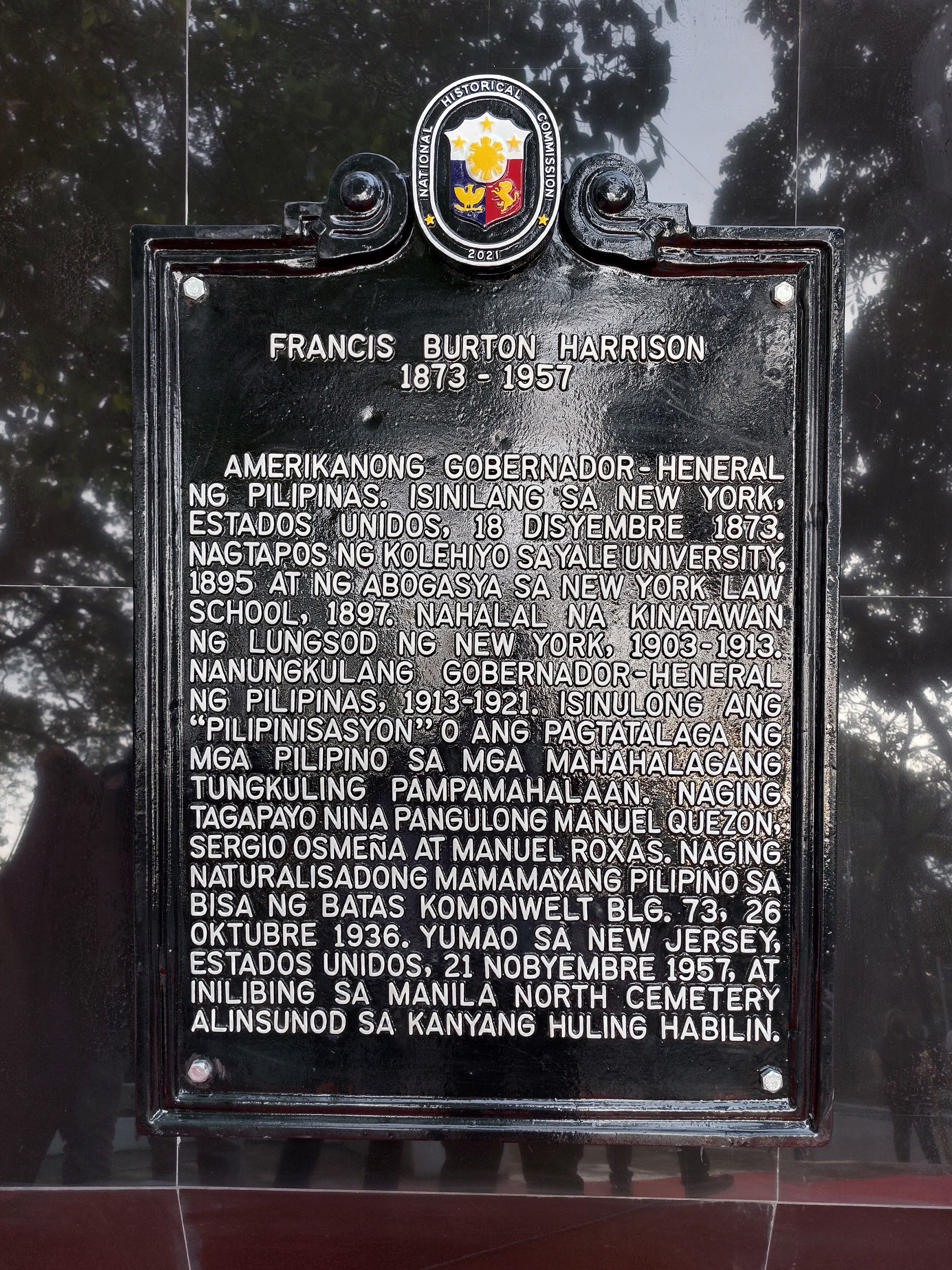
Historical marker unveiled by the National Historical Commission of the Philippines in 2021 located beside Harrison's tomb.

F.B. Harrison Street in the Metro Manila cities of Manila, Pasay, and Parañaque was named after him. Harrison Road in Baguio, a major thoroughfare beginning in the city center between Burnham Park and near the Baguio Convention Center, is also named for Harrison.

== Published works ==
- The Corner-Stone of Philippine Independence (1922)
- Indo-China, A Sportsman's Opportunity (1933, with Archibald Cary Harrison)
- Origins of the Philippine Republic: Extracts from the Diaries and Records of Francis Burton Harrison (1974, posthumous)

Party political offices
Preceded by Charles N. Bulger	Democratic nominee for Lieutenant Governor of New York; 1904	Succeeded by Lewis Stuyvesant Chanler
U.S. House of Representatives
Preceded by Oliver Belmont	Member of the U.S. House of Representatives from New York's 13th congressional district 1903–1905	Succeeded by Herbert Parsons
Preceded by Jacob Ruppert	Member of the U.S. House of Representatives from New York's 16th congressional district 1907–1913	Succeeded by Peter J. Dooling
Preceded by Thomas W. Bradley	Member of the U.S. House of Representatives from New York's 20th congressional district 1913	Succeeded by Jacob A. Cantor
Government offices
Preceded by William Cameron Forbes	Governor-General of the Philippines; 1913–1921	Succeeded by Charles Yeater
