= Lloyd Wescott =

American Agriculturalist

Lloyd Bruce Wescott
- Born: Lloyd Bruce Wescott; November 21, 1907; Washington County, Wisconsin, U.S.
- Died: December 24, 1990 (aged 83); Rosemont, Hunterdon County, New Jersey, U.S.
- Occupation(s): agriculturalist civil servant
- Spouse: Barbara Harrison

Lloyd Bruce Wescott (November 21, 1907 – December 24, 1990) was an agriculturalist, civil servant, and philanthropist in New Jersey. Born and educated in Wisconsin, he moved to New York after college before settling in New Jersey where he served as a member of agricultural boards, chairman of the New Jersey State Board of Control of Institutions and Agencies, and founder and first president of the Hunterdon Medical Center. He was also a major fundraiser and donor of land that became Wescott Preserve in Hunterdon County. Novelist Glenway Wescott was his brother.

== Biography ==
Wescott was born in 1907 on a dairy farm outside Farmington, Washington County, Wisconsin, the son of Bruce and Josephine Wescott. His elder brother Glenway was also born in Wisconsin in 1901. He graduated from high school in Ripon, Wisconsin and attended Ripon College. He then lived for several years in New York City.

In March 1935, Wescott married Barbara Harrison, the daughter of Francis Burton Harrison, Governor-General of the Philippines under Woodrow Wilson. In 1936 they purchased a 1,000-acre (4.0 km^{2}) dairy farm along the Mulhocaway Creek in Union Township near Clinton in Hunterdon County, New Jersey. Mulhocaway Farm, as it was known, became the headquarters for the Artificial Breeding Association, a pioneer in the artificial insemination of dairy cows. In the 1950s, Mulhocaway Farm was acquired by the State of New Jersey under eminent domain in order to create the Spruce Run Reservoir.

In 1959 the Wescotts moved to a 147-acre (0.59 km^{2}) farm further south in Hunterdon County, near the community of Rosemont in Delaware Township. The farm had been previously owned by big band leader Paul Whiteman.

Wescott was a member of the State Board of Agriculture from 1952 to 1956. He was appointed as chairman of the State Board of Control of Institutions and Agencies (later renamed the State Board of Human Services) in 1956. He also served as Chairman of the National Agricultural Stabilization Committee for Dairy Products in 1961.

Wescott was one of the founders of the Hunterdon Medical Center in Raritan Township near Flemington, New Jersey. He was chairman of the Medical Center's first study group set up in 1946. In 1949 Wescott chaired the fundraising drive to raise $1.2 million for the construction of the hospital. He subsequently served as President of the Board from 1950 onwards, and was instrumental in establishing a progressive approach to rural medical care. The street leading to the Hunterdon Medical Center is named Wescott Drive in his honor.

Wescott received an honorary degree of Doctor of Humane Letters from Lafayette College in 1955. He was awarded a similar degree by Rutgers University in 1960.

In 1966 the Wescotts donated their farmland in Rosemont for the creation of the Wescott Preserve, the first county park in Hunterdon County.

In 1987, Wescott sold most of his remaining farmland. He remained active in farmland preservation, helping to dedicate the New Jersey Museum of Agriculture on the Cook College campus of Rutgers University in 1989.

== Personal life ==
Before her marriage to Wescott, Barbara Harrison lived in France, where she worked closely with other American expatriates in the literary world. She and Monroe Wheeler established Harrison of Paris, a press publishing limited-edition literary paperbacks. From 1930 to 1934, Harrison of Paris published thirteen titles, including two new works by Glenway Wescott, Monroe Wheeler's longtime companion. In 1934, shortly before Barbara Harrison married Lloyd Wescott, the press relocated to New York, where it published a final title, Katherine Anne Porter's Hacienda.

Glenway Wescott and Monroe Wheeler returned to the United States and maintained an apartment in Manhattan with photographer George Platt Lynes. When Lloyd and Barbara Wescott moved to Mulhocaway Farm, Glenway along with Wheeler and Lynes took over one of the farmhand houses and called it Stone-Blossom. When Lloyd and Barbara later moved to the Rosemont farm, a two-story stone house, dubbed Haymeadows, was reserved for Glenway. He died at the Rosemont residence in 1987.

Barbara Wescott continued her patronage of the arts throughout her life. She was a noted collector of artwork, and she played a critical role in the development of the New Jersey State Museum, serving on the museum's Advisory Council. After her death in 1977, a sculpture garden was dedicated in her memory at the State Museum.

== Death ==
Wescott died in 1990 at his Rosemont home at the age of 83.

In 2007, the Hunterdon Medical Center named the Wescott Medical Arts Center in his honor.
