= Paul Cadmus =

American artist (1904–1999)

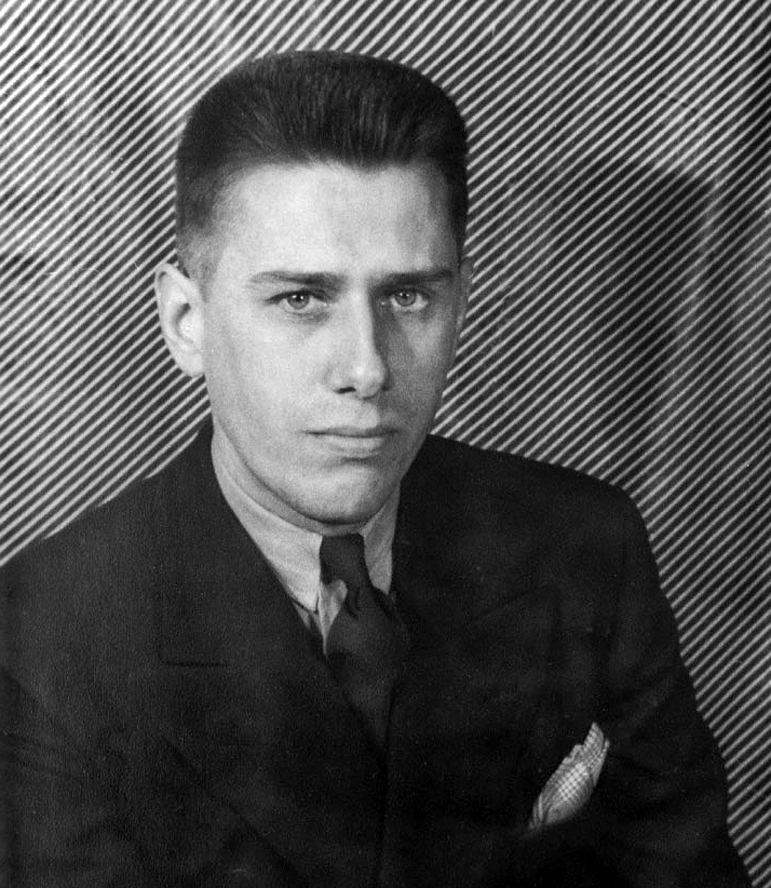
- Paul Cadmus 1937, by Carl Van Vechten
- Born: December 17, 1904; Manhattan, New York City, US
- Died: December 12, 1999 (aged 94); Weston, Connecticut, U.S.
- Education: Art Students League of New York
- Known for: Painting, drawing PaJaMa
- Movement: Magic realism
- Elected: National Academy of Design

Paul Cadmus (December 17, 1904 – December 12, 1999) was an American artist widely known for his egg tempera paintings of gritty social interactions in urban settings. He also produced many highly finished drawings of single nude male figures. His paintings combine elements of eroticism and social critique in a style often called magic realism.

== Early life and education ==
Cadmus was born on December 17, 1904, in a tenement on 103rd Street near Amsterdam Avenue, on the Upper West Side of Manhattan, the son of artists, Maria Latasa, of Basque and Cuban ancestry, and Egbert Cadmus (1868–1939), of Dutch ancestry. His father, who studied with Robert Henri, worked as a commercial artist, and his mother illustrated children's books. His sister, Fidelma Cadmus, married Lincoln Kirstein, a philanthropist, arts patron, and co-founder of the New York City Ballet, in 1941.

At age 15, Cadmus left school to attend the National Academy of Design for 6 years. In 1925, at age 20, Cadmus became a member of The Brooklyn Society of Etchers (now known as the Society of American Graphic Artists or SAGA). In their 10th Annual Exhibition held at the Brooklyn Museum he showed three etchings, "Fidelma", "Calogero Scibetta" and "Kramer". He enrolled at the Art Students League of New York in 1928 taking life-drawing lessons while working as a commercial illustrator at a New York advertising agency. He furthered his education while traveling through Europe from 1931 to 1933 with fellow artist Jared French, who became his lover for a time.

== Career ==
After traveling through France and Spain, Cadmus and French settled in a fishing village on the island Mallorca. In 1933, they headed back to the United States after running out of money, where Cadmus was one of the first artists to be employed by The New Deal art programs, painting murals at post offices. He maintained a studio at 54 Morton Street.

Cadmus worked in commercial illustration as well, but French, also a tempera artist, convinced him to devote himself completely to fine art. In 1979, he was elected into the National Academy of Design as an associate member and became a full member in 1980.

Cadmus is ranked by Artists Trade Union of Russia amongst the world's best artists of the last four centuries.

=== Controversies ===
The Fleet's In! (1934), cropped view

In 1934, at the age of 29, he painted The Fleet's In! while working for the Public Works of Art Project. This painting, which featured carousing sailors and women, included a stereotypical homosexual solicitation and erotic exaggeration of clinging pants seats and bulging crotches. It was the subject of a public outcry led by Admiral Hugh Rodman, who protested to Secretary of the Navy Claude A. Swanson, saying, "It represents a most disgraceful, sordid, disreputable, drunken brawl." Secretary Swanson stated that the painting was "right artistic" but "not true to the Navy." The painting was removed from exhibition at the Corcoran Gallery by Henry L. Roosevelt, the Assistant Secretary of the Navy at the time, and kept in his home until Roosevelt's death in 1936. The publicity helped to launch Cadmus's career, and he stated at the time, "I had no intention of offending the Navy. Sailors are no worse than anybody else. In my picture I merely commented on them – I didn't criticize." The painting, which after Roosevelt's death hung over a mantel at the Alibi Club in Washington for more than half a century, was kept from public view until 1981, temporarily displayed at the Wolfsonian Museum in Miami, and eventually found a home at the Naval Historical Center.

In 1938, his painting Pocahantas Saving the Life of John Smith, a mural painted for the Parcel Post Building in Richmond, Virginia, had to be retouched when some observers noticed a fox pelt suggestively hanging between the legs of an Indian depicted in the painting. Cadmus used his then lover, Jared French, as the model for John Smith in the mural.

In 1940, two paintings, Sailors and Floozies (1938) and Seeing the New Year In, were removed from public view because the Navy "didn't like it" and there was "too much smell about it." The paintings were being exhibited at the Golden Gate International Exposition and were removed, while a third, Venus and Adonis, remained. The office of Commissioner George Creel was told by the Navy that the painting, Sailors and Floozies, was "unnecessarily dirty."

=== Artistic style ===
Cadmus, considered to be a master draftsman, was interested in the Italian Renaissance artists, particularly Signorelli and Mantegna, the so-called "masters of muscle." He was also influenced by Reginald Marsh, an American scene painter. Cadmus combined the elements of Signorelli and Mantegna along with Marsh to depict the street life of New York City.

He was transfixed by the human body, both the ideal and the repulsive. His ideal was a stylized erotic version of the male body. He found the grotesque everywhere from Greenwich Village cafes, subway stations, the beach at Coney Island to American tourists in an Italian piazza. His art is a form of satire and caricature of his subjects that has been compared to fellow artists George Grosz and Otto Dix. Art critics have been divided on Cadmus' art, with Dore Ashton stating that "he's not a historical figure at all, he's an also-ran." Ashton described his paintings as "skewed Saturday Evening Post." In 1990, Michael Kimmelman wrote that Cadmus' art served "as a reminder that, contrary to the standard view, realism was still a vital tradition in American art during the middle of this century, one that drew from many of the same sources that inspired the Abstract Expressionists who were widely thought to have rendered realism obsolete."

== Personal life ==
From 1937 until the early 1950s, Cadmus, his lover, Jared French, and French's wife, Margaret French, formed a photographic collective called PaJaMa ("Paul, Jared, and Margaret"). During vacations in Saltaire, New York, Fire Island and later Provincetown, Massachusetts and Nantucket, the trio photographed each other on the beach and indoors, donning makeshift costumes and using found objects as props to create scenes of Magic Realism. They passed around Margaret's Leica camera, becoming subjects and makers in turn.

Many of their friends were featured in the photographs — they were among New York's young artists, dancers, and writers, and most were handsome and gay. Among those photographed were Tennessee Williams, Glenway Wescott, Monroe Wheeler, Donald Windham, Todd Bolender, Bernard Perlin, Chuck Howard, Ted Starkowski, Christopher Isherwood, and Paul Cadmus's sister Fidelma and her husband Lincoln Kirstein. Cadmus and French also posed for photographs with the noted photographer George Platt Lynes (1907–1955). These photographs were not published or exhibited while Lynes was living and show the intimacy and relationship of the two.

From 1944-1949, Cadmus was involved with artist George Tooker, forming a complicated relationship with French and his wife. When the Frenches bought a home in Hartland, Vermont, they gave Cadmus a house of his own on the property, which French later took back and gave to his Italian lover.

In 1965, Cadmus met and began a relationship with Jon (Farquhar) Anderson (July 30, 1937, New Haven, Connecticut - October 21, 2018, Weston, Connecticut). The relationship with Anderson, a former Nantucket cabaret singer 32 years younger than Cadmus, lasted until Cadmus' death in 1999. During their 35-year relationship, Anderson was Cadmus' model and muse in many of his works. Cadmus was also close friends with many illustrious artists, authors, and dancers including Christopher Isherwood, W. H. Auden, George Balanchine, George Platt Lynes, Lincoln Kirstein (his brother-in-law), and E. M. Forster, who was said to have read his novel Maurice aloud while Cadmus painted his portrait, which was printed in 1200 copies of a pamphlet The New Disorder in 1949.

In 1999, he died at his home in Weston, Connecticut, due to advanced age, five days before his 95th birthday.

== List of works ==
From 1931 until 1992, Cadmus produced 120 paintings, two a year on average. Some highlights include:

- Jerry, 1931, Toledo Museum of Art, Toledo, Ohio
- YMCA Locker Room, 1933
- Shore Leave, 1933, Whitney Museum of American Art, New York City
- The Fleet's In!, 1934, Navy Art Gallery, Washington Navy Yard
- Greenwich Village Cafeteria, 1934
- Coney Island (oil painting), 1934, Los Angeles County Museum of Art
- Gilding the Acrobats, 1935, Metropolitan Museum of Art
- Coney Island (etching), 1935, Los Angeles County Museum of Art
- Aspects of Suburban Life: Main Street, 1935, D.C. Moore Gallery
- Aspects of Suburban Life: Golf, 1936, Virtual Museum of Canada
- Venus and Adonis, 1936
- Sailors and Floozies, 1938, Whitney Museum of American Art, New York City
- Pocahontas and John Smith, 1938, Richmond Virginia Parcel Post Office, now in Richmond Federal Courthouse library
- Two Boys on a Beach #1, 1938, D.C. Moore Gallery
- Bathers, 1939
- Herrin Massacre, 1940, Columbus Museum of Art, Columbus, Ohio
- Aviator, 1941
- The Shower, 1943
- Point O' View, 1945, Williams College Museum of Art, Williamstown, Massachusetts
- The Seven Deadly Sins, 1945–1949, Metropolitan Museum of Art, New York City
- Fences, 1946, Crystal Bridges Museum of American Art, Bentonville, Arkansas
- What I Believe, 1947–48, McNay Art Museum, San Antonio, Texas
- Playground, 1948, Georgia Museum of Art, Athens, Georgia
- The Bath, 1951, Whitney Museum of American Art, New York City
- Manikins, 1951
- Bar Italia, 1953–55
- Night in Bologna, 1958, Smithsonian American Art Museum, Washington, DC
- Sunday Sun, 1958–59
- Le Ruban Dénoué: Hommage à Reynaldo Hahn, 1963, Columbus Museum of Art (Philip J. & Suzanne Schiller collection), Columbus, Ohio
- Jon Anderson in White Tights, 1966, Crystal Bridges Museum of American Art, Bentonville, Arkansas
- Male Nude, 1966, Kemper Museum of Contemporary Art, Missouri
- The Eighth Sin: Jealousy, 1982–83, Metropolitan Museum of Art, New York City
- The Haircut, 1986
- Final Study for the House that Jack Built, 1987, D.C. Moore Gallery
- Me: 1940–1990, 1990, D.C. Moore Gallery
- Jon Reading NM248, 1992, D.C. Moore Gallery
- Jon Extracting a Splinter NM255, 1993, D.C. Moore Gallery
- Self-Portrait, Crystal Bridges Museum of American Art, Bentonville, Arkansas

== Exhibitions ==
- Corcoran Gallery, Washington, District of Columbia, 1935
- Midtown Galleries, New York, 1937
- Baltimore Museum of Art, Baltimore, 1942
- William Benton Museum of Art, Storrs, Connecticut, 1982
- Hudson River Museum, Yonkers, New York, 1982
- Whitney Museum of American Art, New York, 1996
- D.C. Moore Gallery, New York, 1996
- D.C. Moore Gallery, New York, 2024
- Madison Museum of Contemporary Art, 2014
