= Marcel Khill =

French actor (1912–1940)

- Born: Mustapha Marcel Khelilou ben Abdelkader; 6 March 1912; Meulan, Paris, France
- Died: 18 June 1940 (aged 28); Réchicourt-le-Château, France
- Other name: Passepartout
- Occupations: Actor; model; secretary
- Years active: 1932–1940
- Partner(s): Jean Cocteau (1932–1937); Glenway Wescott (1936–1940)
- Relatives: Denyse de Bravura (1938–1940)
- Awards: Croix de Guerre (1940)

Marcel Khill (born Mustapha Marcel Khelilou ben Abdelkader; 6 March 1912 – 18 June 1940) was a French-Algerian stage actor, model, and secretary. He is best known as the romantic partner, muse, and creative collaborator of the French avant-garde writer and director Jean Cocteau during the 1930s. Khill served as the inspiration for various literary characters and was the subject of numerous contemporary works of art. He was killed in action during the Battle of France in World War II.

== Early life ==
Marcel Khill was born on 6 March 1912 in Meulan, a commune northwest of Paris, France. He came from a working-class background; his father was an Algerian soldier serving in the French military, and his mother was a peasant woman from the Normandy region. Khill spent his childhood and youth navigating the metropolitan areas and suburbs surrounding Paris, where he developed an interest in the visual and performing arts.

== Career ==
=== Becoming secretary of Jean Cocteau (1932) ===
In the summer of 1932, Khill met Cocteau at La Seyne-sur-Mer. At the time, Cocteau's long-term romance with the writer Jean Desbordes was drawing to a close. Khill and Cocteau subsequently entered a romantic relationship, and Khill was hired to serve as Cocteau's personal secretary, entering his bohemian inner circle.

=== Relationship with Jean Cocteau (1932–1937) ===
Their relationship was openly recognized among contemporary literary and artistic circles in France. The American novelist Glenway Wescott recorded visiting the couple at a hotel in Villefranche-sur-Mer, noting their domestic arrangement. Cocteau frequently used wordplay regarding Khill's chosen surname, remarking that the young man "kills me" (il me khill) due to the intense nature of their affair.

=== Artistic collaborations with Jean ===
Khill became actively involved in Cocteau's theatrical and literary output. On 9 April 1934, Cocteau premiered his avant-garde adaptation of the Oedipus myth, La Machine infernale (The Infernal Machine), at the Comédie des Champs-Élysées. Cocteau cast Khill in the production, where he originated the physical stage role of the Messenger of Corinth.

In 1936, Khill initiated a travel challenge to replicate the journey depicted in Jules Verne's novel Around the World in Eighty Days. Financially backed by the French newspaper Paris-Soir, Khill and Cocteau completed the global circuit together. Their itinerary included stops in Coney Island, Kashmir, and various international landmarks. Cocteau serialized reports of their travels in the press and later compiled the material into the 1936 travelogue Mon Premier Voyage (My First Voyage), in which Khill was featured under the pseudonym "Passepartout".

=== Later life and engagement ===
By 1937, the romantic dynamic between the two shifted when the young actor Jean Marais became Cocteau's primary partner and creative muse. Despite this transition, Khill remained a close confidant and regular associate within Cocteau's circle.

=== Military service ===
Following the outbreak of World War II in September 1939, Khill was mobilized into the French Armed Forces and deployed to the active front lines in the Alsace region. He was awarded the Croix de Guerre for his service.

== Personal life ==
In 1938, Khill met Denyse de Bravura, a young French illustrator and cartoonist. The couple became formally engaged. Through his connections, Khill introduced Bravura to prominent figures of the Parisian avant-garde, including Cocteau, Jean Marais, and Coco Chanel. Khill and Cocteau maintained an intimate attachment up until the outbreak of World War II, occasionally secret romantic connection away from the knowledge of Bravura reflecting the fluid boundary lines characteristic of Cocteau's personal relationships.

Later he and poet Glenway Wescott got into an intimate relationship.

== Death ==
On 18 June 1940, Khill was killed in action at Réchicourt-le-Château. His death occurred during a period of severe communication breakdowns on the front lines, which delayed the transmission of the formal French armistice request. Unaware that a surrender was being negotiated, Khill's unit continued to engage German forces, and he was shot and killed at the age of 28. Due to the wartime chaos and subsequent occupation of France, his fiancée, Denyse de Bravura, did not receive official confirmation of his death from the German Red Cross until 1942.

== Stage ==
=== Theatre ===
Year	Title	Role(s)	Venue(s)	Notes
1934	La Machine infernale	Messener of Corinth	Comédie des Champs-Élysées	Cocteau, who provided the voice of the Phantom and he officially introduced Khill into the cast.

== Awards and nominations ==
Year	Award	Category	Result	Title	Ref.
1940	Croix de Guerre	Award by the Government of France	Honored	For his service	

== Legacy ==
Khill was a prominent visual subject within the 1930s Parisian avant-garde scene. Cocteau executed dozens of drawings, sketches, and oil portraits of Khill over the course of their association. Notable works include Portrait de Marcel Khill (1933), Portrait of Marcel Khill in the role of the Messenger (1934), and several intimate sketches, such as Marcel Khill Endormi (Marcel Khill Sleeping), as well as drawings produced during their 1936 global tour.

Khill also modeled for the American photographer George Platt Lynes. In a 1935 surrealist studio photograph series, Lynes captured Khill posing alongside the physical canvas drawings that Cocteau had created of him.

== See also ==
- Jean Cocteau
