= Jared French =

American painter (1905–1988)

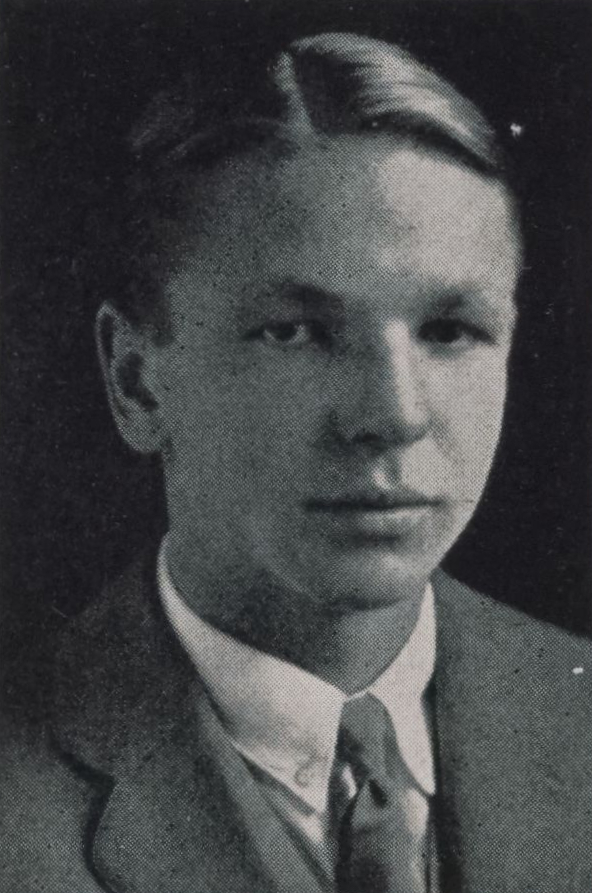
- French in the Amherst College yearbook, 1925
- Born: February 4, 1905; Ossining, New York, U.S.
- Died: January 8, 1988 (aged 82); Rome, Italy
- Education: Art Students League
- Known for: Painting PaJaMa
- Spouse: Margaret French

Jared Blandford French (February 4, 1905 – January 8, 1988) was an American painter who specialized in the medium of egg tempera. He was one of the artists attributed to the style of art known as magic realism along with contemporaries George Tooker and Paul Cadmus.

== Early life ==
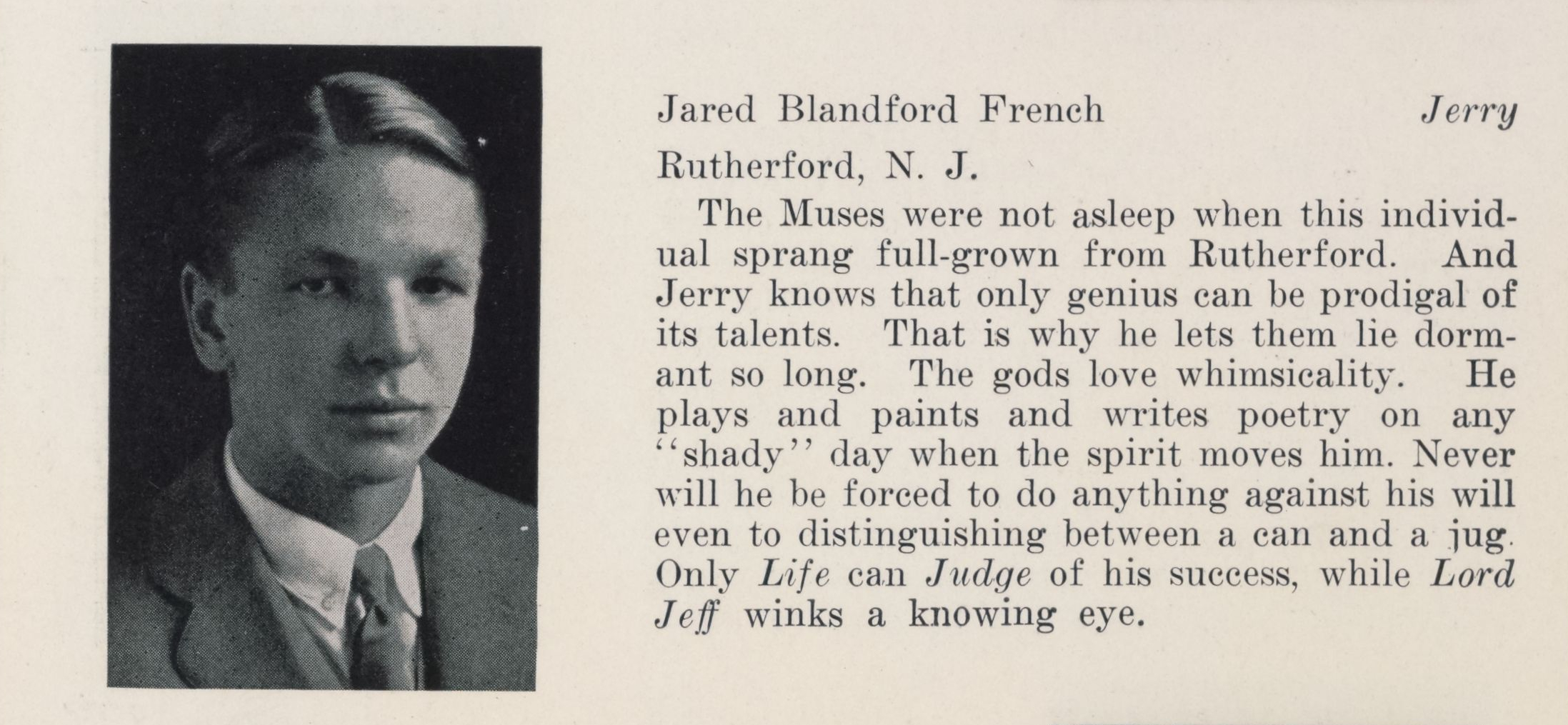
French in the Amherst College yearbook, 1925

Born in Ossining, New York, French received a Bachelor of Arts degree from Amherst College in 1925. Soon after this he met and befriended Paul Cadmus (1904–1999) in New York City, who became his lover. French persuaded Cadmus to give up commercial art for what he deemed, "serious painting". In 1930, while French and Cadmus were students together at New York's Art Students League, Italian artist Luigi Lucioni painted French in a painting entitled Jared French, that is currently owned by the Metropolitan Museum of Art in 1994.

== Career ==
Cavalrymen Crossing a River (1939), French's central mural for the Parcel Post Building in Richmond, Virginia, is now displayed at the Lewis F. Powell Jr. United States Courthouse. Life magazine reported that French painted himself into the mural as the figure wearing suspenders.

During the late 1930s and early 1940s, French painted New Deal murals. French's early paintings are eerie, colorful tableauxs of still, silent figures derived from Archaic Greek statues. His later work shows "a kind of classical biomorphism," strange, colorful, suggestive organic forms. Jungian psychology is thought to have played an important influence upon the dream-like imagery in the paintings of French's maturity. The highly stylized, archaic-looking figures in his paintings suggest that they are representative of the ancestral memory of all mankind, what Carl Jung called "the collective unconscious". French himself was never explicit about the sources of his imagery, although on a stylistic level, the influence of early Italian Renaissance paintings by such masters as Mantegna and Piero della Francesca is evident, as it is also in the work of both Tooker and Cadmus. On the level of content, he made only one, short, public statement regarding his intentions:

My work has long been concerned with the representation of diverse aspects of man and his universe. At first it was mainly concerned with his physical aspect and his physical universe. Gradually I began to represent aspects of his psyche, until in The Sea (1946) and Evasion (1947), I showed quite clearly my interest in man's inner reality.

For the Section of Painting and Sculpture, French produced murals for the post office in Plymouth, Pennsylvania (1938), and for the Parcel Post Building in Richmond, Virginia (1939).

== Personal life ==
In 1937, French married Margaret Hoening (died 1998). For the next eight years Cadmus and the Frenches summered on Fire Island and formed a photographic collective called PaJaMa ("Paul, Jared, and Margaret"). In between Provincetown, Truro, Fire Island, and New York, they staged various black and white photographs of themselves with their friends, both nude and clothed. Most of these friends featured in the photographs were among New York's young artists, dancers and writers, and most were handsome and gay.

In 1938, French and Cadmus posed for a series photographs with the noted photographer George Platt Lynes (1907–1955). These photographs were not published or exhibited while Lynes was living and show the intimacy and relationship of the two. In the photographs, 14 of which survive today, the subjects, Cadmus and French, vacillate between exposure and concealment, with French generally being the more exhibitionist of the two. Cadmus stated that French was the model for all four male figures in his 1935 painting, Gilding the Acrobats, as well as his 1931 painting, Jerry. In addition, French modeled as John Smith for Cadmus' mural in 1938, Pocahontas Rescued Captain John Smith at the Richmond Parcel Post Building.

Later in the 1940s, French and his wife formed a complicated relationship with Cadmus and Cadmus' then-lover, George Tooker (1920–2011). When French and Margaret bought a home in Hartland, Vermont, they gave Cadmus a house of his own on the property. French later took the house back and gave it to his Italian lover.

French died in Rome in 1988 and many of his paintings remain with his friend, Roberto Gianatta.

== Works in collections ==
- Seat by the Sea, 1959, Smithsonian American Art Museum, Washington, DC
- Nude and Dress Suit, 1950, Smithsonian American Art Museum, Washington, DC
- Evasion, 1947, Cleveland Museum of Art, Cleveland, Ohio
- State Park, 1946, Whitney Museum of American Art, New York, New York
- Learning, 1946, Smithsonian American Art Museum, Washington, DC
- Music, 1943, Georgia Museum of Art, Athens, Georgia
- John Pelham, 1939, Court House Annex, Richmond, Virginia
- The Rope, 1954, Whitney Museum of American Art
- Cavalrymen Crossing a River, 1939, Court House Annex, Richmond, Virginia
- Safe, 1937, National Baseball Hall of Fame and Museum, Cooperstown, New York
- Mealtime, The Early Coal Miners, 1937, Plymouth Post Office, Plymouth, Pennsylvania.
- Mealtime, The Early Coal Miners (Mural Study), 1936, Smithsonian American Art Museum, Washington, DC
- Mealtime, The Early Coal Miners (Mural Study), 1935, Smithsonian American Art Museum, Washington, DC

== Exhibitions ==
- Banfer Gallery, New York, 1969
- Banfer Gallery, New York, 1967
- Banfer Gallery, New York, 1965
- Robert Isaacson Gallery, New York, 1962
- Edwin Hewitt Gallery, New York, 1955
- Edwin Hewitt Gallery, New York, 1950
- Julien Levy Gallery, New York, 1939
- Morgan Hall, Amherst College, Massachusetts, 1939
- Vassar College Art Gallery, New York, 1939

== Sources ==
- Grimes, Nancy (1993). Jared French's Myths. San Francisco, California: Pomegranate Artbooks. ISBN 978-1-56640-322-1.
- The Essence of Magic Realism - Critical Study of the origins and development of Magic Realism in art.
- Jerry Wechsler (1992) The Rediscovery of Jared French. New York: Midtown Payson Galleries
