= Harrison of Paris =

French publishing house

Harrison of Paris was a publishing house originally founded in Paris in 1930 by Monroe Wheeler and Barbara Harrison Wescott.

== Origins ==
In the 1920s Monroe Wheeler bought a small print press he named Manikin. Partnering with Barbara Harrison Wescott in 1930 they founded Harrison of Paris and specialized in limited-edition books, publishing in total 13 books, two of which by Glenway Wescott, Wheeler's longtime partner and Harrison's brother-in-law. Harrison of Paris moved to New York City in 1934, the same year it stopped production.

== Catalogue ==
- 1930 Venus and Adonis by William Shakespeare
- 1930 The Wild West by Bret Harte, illustrations by Pierre Falké
- 1930 A Sketch of my Life by Thomas Mann
- 1930 The Babe's Bed by Glenway Wescott
- 1931 Fables of Aesop, translation by Sir Roger L'Estrange, illustrations by Alexander Calder
- 1931 Carmen and Letters from Spain by Prosper Mérimée, illustrations by Maurice Barraud
- 1931 The Death of Madame by Comtesse de Lafayette, translation by Monroe Wheeler
- 1931 A Gentle Spirit by Fyodor Dostoevsky, translation by Constance Garnett, illustrations by Christian Bérard
- 1931 Childe Harolde's Pilgrimage by Lord Byron, illustrations by Sir Francis Cyril Rose
- 1931 A Calendar of Saints for Unbelievers by Glenway Wescott, illustrations by Pavel Tchelitchew
- 1932 A Typographical Commonplace Book
- 1933 French Song-Book by Katherine Anne Porter
- 1934 Hacienda by Katherine Anne Porter
