= William Christopher (disambiguation) =

William Christopher (1932–2016) was an American actor and comedian.

William Christopher or Billy Christopher may also refer to:

- William R. Christopher (1924–1973), American artist and civil rights activist
- William Christopher of Baden-Baden, (1628–1652), German priest and nobleman
- William Christopher (long jumper), winner of the 1943 NCAA DI outdoor long jump title

== See also ==
- Christopher Williams (disambiguation)
