= The Grandmothers =

The Grandmothers is a 1927 novel by Glenway Wescott which received the Harper Novel Prize. Based upon Wescott's own Wisconsin-based family, it is told through the eyes of young Alwyn Tower who leaves the family farm to live in Europe, but who remains haunted and fascinated by his relatives of previous generations: grandparents, great-uncles and aunts, and others from both his mother's and father's side, many of whose lives were upended by the Civil War. Each chapter is devoted to a different family member.

Written in a lyrical, poetic style, The Grandmothers is Wescott's most enduring work. In a review in The Atlantic Monthly, Mary Ellen Chase praised the novel's "minute attention to concrete detail":

a couch in the Wisconsin house, 'upholstered in rows of yellow tapestry biscuits,' pictures of Mr. Longfellow and Mr. Whittier, 'equally complacent and almost equally muffled by untidy beards,' 'sunshine flashing on the tines of pitchforks,' 'cattle of all colors under the hickories.' Here is a wealth of portraiture combined with a wealth of method.

== Editions ==
- The Grandmothers, a Family Portrait, Harper & Brothers (1927) LCCN 27-26866
- ...with an introduction by Fred B. Millett, Harper & Brothers (1950) LCCN 50-6732
- ...with an introduction by John W. Aldridge, Arbor House (1986) ISBN 0-8779-5799-1
- ...with an introduction by Sargent Bush, Jr., University of Wisconsin Press (1996) ISBN 0-299-15024-0
