= Americans Will Always Fight for Liberty =

World War II poster

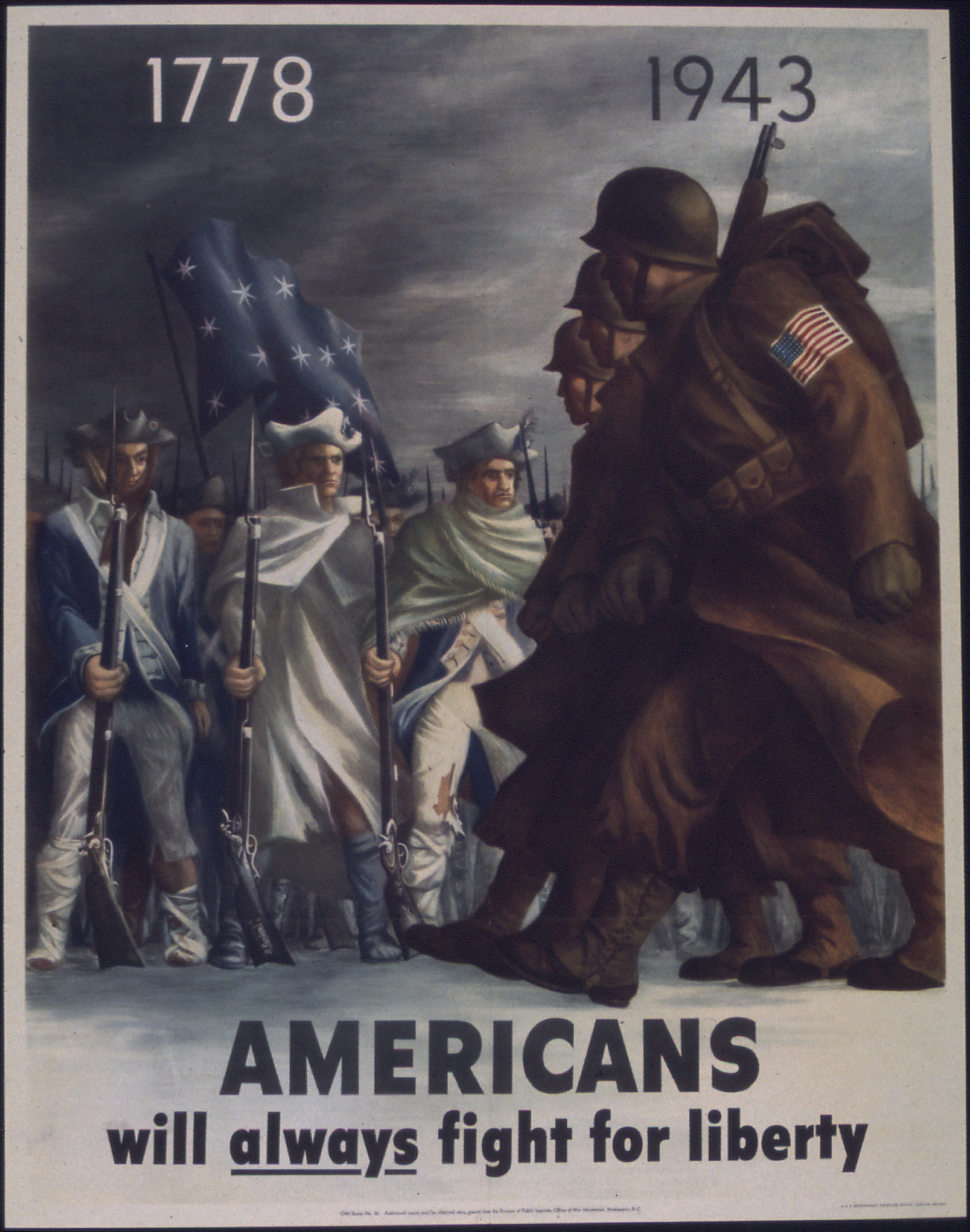
- Artist: Bernard Perlin
- Year: 1943

Americans will always fight for liberty is the title of a poster often displayed throughout the United States during World War II. The poster depicts three American soldiers from 1943 marching in front of members of the Continental Army from 1778.

== History ==
The poster was created in 1943, near the height of the advance of the Axis powers into Europe, Asia and Africa. The poster was produced by the United States Office of War Information to foster patriotism and support for the war effort by depicting American soldiers as freedom fighters. The poster equates the motivations of soldiers of the U.S. Army in World War II to Continental soldiers stationed at Valley Forge, drawing a connection between the soldiers from the Revolutionary War and the soldiers engaged in combat against the Axis powers.

== Impact ==
The poster was displayed throughout the United States in public areas such as schools, libraries, post offices and factories. It helped to instill patriotism during the Second World War and has been called one of the most recognized and enduring posters produced during the World War II era. The poster in underlining the word "always" also attempts to demonstrate that the United States is committed to continue fighting against the Axis powers, as it did the British in the U.S. Revolutionary War.

== Legacy ==
The poster was analyzed by members of the National World War II Museum. They argued that the poster demonstrated transfer propaganda, or an attempt to transfer the belief that Americans fought for liberty during the Revolutionary War to the then-ongoing Second World War.
