= Jean Desbordes =

French poet and actor (1906–1944)

- Born: May 3, 1906; Rupt-sur-Moselle, France
- Died: July 6, 1944 (aged 38); Paris, France
- Other names: Jean De List; Jean-Jean; Duroc
- Occupations: Poet; Novelist; Playwright; Model; Actor
- Years active: 1926 – 1944
- Spouse: Madeleine Peltier (m. 1937; died 1944)
- Partner: Jean Cocteau (1926–1933)
- Awards: Resistance Medal (1947); Virtuti Militari (Gold Cross)

Jean Desbordes (3 May 1906 – 6 July 1944) was a French poet, novelist, actor, and playwright. A prominent figure in the Parisian avant-garde during the interwar period, he was the protégé and lover of Jean Cocteau. During World War II, he served as a high-ranking member of the French Resistance within the Franco-Polish F2 network. He was arrested and tortured to death by the Gestapo in July 1944.

== Early life and education ==
Desbordes was born into a Protestant family in Rupt-sur-Moselle. He attended primary school locally before moving to Remiremont for his secondary education. A gifted student, he completed his baccalaureate before living a largely solitary life in the countryside until 1925, surrounded by his mother, sisters, and animals.

Following the sudden death of Cocteau's previous partner and protégé, Raymond Radiguet, a young Desbordes reached out to Cocteau through a series of passionate letters about literature. Moved by Desbordes's intense gaze and literary talent, Cocteau took him in. Desbordes inspired Cocteau to engage more directly with themes of sexuality in his own work, leading to Cocteau's famous anonymously published piece, The White Book (Le Livre blanc). His life changed after reading Jean Cocteau's novel Le Grand Écart. Inspired by the work, he contacted Cocteau under the pseudonym Jean De List. The resulting correspondence led to Desbordes moving to Paris in 1926 to become Cocteau's secretary.

== Career ==
=== Becoming Muse of Jean Cocteau ===
Desbordes became the central model and muse for Cocteau. Their professional and personal lives were inextricably linked; Desbordes allowed Cocteau total creative freedom over his image, serving as the subject of numerous sketches, oil paintings, and photographs.

=== Literary and artistic career ===
Desbordes's literary debut came in 1928 with the poetic essay J'adore, which featured a controversial preface by Cocteau. The work was aggressively promoted by Cocteau, establishing Desbordes as a rising voice in French literature. During this period, he lived primarily at Cocteau's home at 9 rue Vignon.

Cocteau frequently used Desbordes as a visual subject. In 1929, Cocteau published 25 Drawings of a Sleeper (25 dessins d'un dormeur), a series of sketches depicting Desbordes asleep in a sailor suit. Desbordes also ventured into cinema, appearing in Cocteau's experimental film The Blood of a Poet (1930). Desbordes's involvement in cinema was primarily through his collaboration with Jean Cocteau, serving as both an actor and a creative inspiration.

His later literary output included the novel Les Tragédiens (1931) and the play La Mue (1935). The latter was performed at the Comédie-Française in 1938 under the title L'Âge Ingrat. In 1939, he published a biographical study, Le Vrai Visage du marquis de Sade.

== Personal life ==
Desbordes's relationship with Cocteau was characterized by intense emotional volatility and mutual jealousy. Although they separated as domestic partners after seven years, they remained deeply connected. Desbordes eventually married Madeleine Peltier on 12 August 1937, though he continued to maintain a complicated emotional tie to Cocteau, often expressing dissatisfaction with his domestic life and jealousy toward Cocteau's newer companions, such as Marcel Khill.

=== Resistance activities ===
Following the German occupation of France, Desbordes joined the Resistance in January 1943. Operating under the pseudonym Duroc, he became a key figure in the F2 network. Based in Normandy, he was responsible for monitoring German maritime traffic, submarine bases, and airfields in Cherbourg. The intelligence gathered by his sector was instrumental in the preparations for the Allied landings in June 1944.

== Arrest and death ==
On 5 July 1944, Desbordes was arrested in Paris by the "Gestapo of the Rue de la Pompe," a unit led by Friedrich Berger and notorious for employing French collaborators. Desbordes was subjected to extreme torture for several hours but refused to divulge any information regarding the F2 network. He died of his injuries on the night of 5–6 July 1944.

== Filmography ==
=== Film ===
Year	Title	Role	Notes
1930	The Blood of a Poet	Louis XV Friend	Directed by Jean Cocteau

=== Screenwriter ===
Year	Title	Role	Notes
1940	La Comédie du bonheur	Screenwriter	Desbordes was involved as a screenwriter and contributor to the adaptation of the Nikolai Evreinov play

== Honors ==
He was posthumously awarded the Medal of the French Resistance and the Polish Gold Cross of the Virtuti Militari. His name is inscribed in the Panthéon in Paris among the writers who died for France.

In 2016, a plaque was inaugurated at 180 rue de la Pompe to honor Desbordes and the other resistance fighters tortured at that location.

== Legacy ==
Upon learning of Desbordes's death, Jean Cocteau was reportedly devastated, later writing that Desbordes "was the best of us". Cocteau took a primary role in preserving Desbordes's memory, ensuring that his sacrifice and his literary contributions remained in the public eye.

Cocteau curated and promoted Desbordes's unpublished writings and correspondence. Their extensive exchange of letters, later titled Je t'aime jusqu'à la mort, provided a candid look at their creative and romantic bond.

Desbordes's name was also championed by Cocteau for official recognition, eventually leading to his name being inscribed in the Panthéon in Paris among the writers who died for France.

== See also ==
- Jean Cocteau
