= Barbara Harrison Wescott =

American publisher and heiress

- Born: Barbara Harrison; October 27, 1904; New York City
- Died: April 7, 1977 (aged 72); Rosemont, New Jersey
- Education: Oxford University
- Occupation: Publisher
- Spouse: Lloyd Wescott
- Parent(s): Francis Burton Harrison (father); Mary Crocker (mother)
- Relatives: Constance Cary Harrison (paternal grandmother); Burton Harrison (paternal grandfather); Charles Crocker (maternal grandfather); Monroe Wheeler (brother-in-law)

Barbara Harrison Wescott (October 27, 1904 – April 7, 1977) was an American publisher and heiress. She and Monroe Wheeler established Harrison of Paris, a press publishing limited-edition deluxe hard-cover books. She was also an avid collector of artwork.

== Biography ==
Barbara Harrison Wescott was born on October 27, 1904, in New York City. She was the second daughter of Francis Burton Harrison and his first wife Mary Crocker, an heiress from San Francisco. Her maternal grandfather was Charles Crocker, a self-made multi-millionaire who founded the Central Pacific Railroad and, with three other men, took over the Southern Pacific Railroad and built the transcontinental railroad. Harrison's mother was killed in a car accident in 1905 at age 23 when Barbara was barely a year old. According to a 1914 article in The Washington Post, her inheritance from her mother was then worth some $1.8 million; equivalent to $64,500,000 in 2025. In 1922, she moved to England where she studied for three years at Oxford, and then moved to Paris in 1925.

== Publishing company ==
While living in France, she worked closely with other American expatriates in the literary world. She and Monroe Wheeler established Harrison of Paris, a press publishing limited-edition deluxe hard-cover books, with rare typefaces, and Montgolfier Frères paper or Iridescent Imperial Japan paper. From 1930 to 1934, Harrison of Paris published thirteen titles, including Lord Byron's Childe Harold's Pilgrimage, Venus and Adonis by William Shakespeare, Fables of Aesop with drawings by Alexander Calder, A Gentle Spirit by Fyodor Dostoevsky, and two new works by Glenway Wescott, Wheeler's longtime companion. In 1934, the press relocated to New York, where it published a final title, Katherine Anne Porter's Hacienda. Glenway Wescott's 1940 novel The Pilgrim Hawk: A Love Story, "fictionalized a real day in Harrison's Rambouillet home with Harrison and her guests", and Porter's 1962 novel Ship of Fools was dedicated to Harrison.

== Move to New Jersey ==
In 1935 she married Glenway's brother Lloyd Wescott, and the next year the couple bought a farm along the Mulhocaway Creek in Union Township near Clinton in Hunterdon County, New Jersey. She continued her patronage of the arts throughout her life and was a noted collector of artwork. She began her collecting in Paris, and some of her notable pieces include works by Gustave Courbet, Paul Gauguin, André Derain, Pablo Picasso, Eugène Delacroix, Pierre-Auguste Renoir, Pierre Bonnard, Chaïm Soutine, Claude Monet, Maurice Utrillo and Pavel Tchelitchew.

In 1959, she and her husband bought a farm from the big band leader Paul Whiteman, in Hunterdon County, near the community of Rosemont in Delaware Township, after their Mulhocaway Creek farm was taken by the State of New Jersey under eminent domain in order to create the Spruce Run Reservoir. In 1966, they donated part of their land to the state, to create the Wescott Nature Preserve.

She died at her home in Rosemont, New Jersey in 1977. In May 1977, there was a groundbreaking ceremony for a garden dedicated to her at the New Jersey State Museum. American artist Ben Shahn created mosaic murals for the sculpture garden.
