= Monroe Wheeler =

American publisher and museum coordinator

- Portrait by George Platt Lynes (1937)
- Born: 13 February 1899; Evanston, Illinois, US
- Died: 14 August 1988 (aged 89); New York City, US
- Occupations: Museum curator and publisher
- Partner: Glenway Wescott

Monroe Wheeler (13 February 1899 – 14 August 1988) was an American publisher and museum coordinator whose relationship with the novelist and poet Glenway Wescott lasted from 1919 until Wescott's death in 1987.

== Biography ==
Wheeler was born in Evanston, Illinois in 1899. He met Glenway Wescott, who was his partner for the rest of their lives, in 1919. During the 1920s, Wescott and Wheeler lived and worked in Germany and France.

With an inheritance from his family, Wheeler bought a small printing press, and with Barbara Harrison, established Harrison of Paris, specializing in limited-edition books; they published in total thirteen books, including two works by Wheeler's partner, Wescott. In 1934 they moved the press to New York City. The last book published by Harrison of Paris was Hacienda by Katherine Anne Porter.

In 1935, Wheeler was employed by New York's Museum of Modern Art. He was initially on the Library Committee and three years later he was made Director of Membership, before becoming Director of Publications in the following year. In 1940, MOMA created the role of Director of Exhibitions and Wheeler was the first person to hold the post. In 1944, he became one of MOMA's Trustees and he later sat on the Executive Committee, the Exhibitions Program Committee, and also the Coordination Committee. By 1948, Wheeler was leading the Exhibitions and Publications, the outreach programs and the library.

Wheeler photographed by George Platt Lynes (1940)

For over a decade, the photographer George Platt Lynes had a relationship with Wheeler and Wescott. Both Paul Cadmus' Conversation Piece (1940), and Jared French's Glenway Wescott, George Platt Lynes and Monroe Wheeler made triptych portraits of Wheeler, Wescott and Lynes. When We Were Three: The Travel Albums of George Platt Lynes, Monroe Wheeler, and Glenway Wescott, 1925–1935 was published in 1998. Lynes ended his relationship with Wheeler and Wescott in 1943 to be with his studio assistant, George Tichenor. Another of Wheeler's lovers was the artist and model Christian William Miller. When Lloyd Wescott, Glenway's brother, moved to a farm in Union Township in 1936, Wescott, Wheeler and Lynes took over one of Lloyd's farm's houses and named it Stone-Blossom. In 1959, when Lloyd Wescott acquired a farm near Rosemont in Delaware Township, Hunterdon County, New Jersey, Glen Wescott moved into a stone house named "Haymeadows" on his brother's land.

In 1987, Glenway Wescott died of a stroke at home. Wheeler died in New York City in 1988, but his ashes were buried with Wescott and this latter family at Haymeadows.
