= George Tooker =

American painter from New York City (1920–2011)

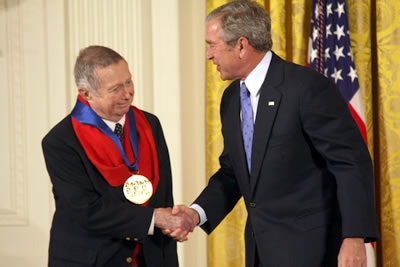
- Tooker (left) receiving the National Medal of Arts from George W. Bush in 2007
- Born: George Clair Tooker, Jr. August 5, 1920; New York City, U.S.
- Died: March 27, 2011 (aged 90); Hartland, Vermont, U.S.
- Education: Phillips Academy; Harvard University; Art Students League of New York
- Movement: Figurative art, Social realism, Surrealism Magic realism
- Awards: National Medal of Arts
- Elected: National Academy of Design

George Clair Tooker, Jr. (August 5, 1920 – March 27, 2011) was an American figurative painter. His works are associated with magic realism, social realism, photorealism, and surrealism. His subjects are depicted naturally as in a photograph, but the images use flat tones, an ambiguous perspective, and alarming juxtapositions to suggest an imagined or dreamed reality. He did not agree with the association of his work with Magic realism or Surrealism, as he said, "I am after painting reality impressed on the mind so hard that it returns as a dream, but I am not after painting dreams as such, or fantasy." In 1968, he was elected to the National Academy of Design and was a member of the American Academy of Arts and Letters. Tooker was one of nine recipients of the National Medal of Arts in 2007.

== Early life ==
George Tooker was born on August 5, 1920, in Brooklyn, New York, where he spent the first six years of his life. He was raised by his mother, Angela Montejo Roura, who was of English, German and Spanish-Cuban descent and his father George Clair Tooker who was of English and French descent. His religious upbringing was in the Episcopal Church. During the Great Depression, the family resided in Bellport, New York. He had one sister, Mary Tooker Graham.

He took art lessons as a child and spent much of his young adult life at the Fogg Art Museum. He attended Phillips Academy in Andover, Massachusetts, and graduated from Harvard University with an English degree in 1942, after which he enlisted in the Officer Candidates School (United States Marine Corps), but was discharged for medical reasons.

== Career ==
=== Influences ===
Tooker spent the late 1940s and early 1950s in Brooklyn. He studied at the Art Students League of New York under Reginald Marsh from 1943 to 1945. Kenneth Hayes Miller influenced Tooker's work by encouraging the emphasis on form rather than expressive emotion to convey a painting's meaning. Tooker regarded Harry Sternberg a good teacher at the League due to his pointed, challenging questions. Upon reading Daniel V. Thompson's The Practice of Tempera Painting, Tooker began to paint in the traditional Renaissance painting method. Tooker appreciated its slow manner of application in particular.

Tooker acknowledged the need for other art to support his development process. He spent much of his free time reading painting and sculpture books, studying the works of antiquity up to 20th-century art in an effort to augment his artistic vision. He was particularly interested in Classical sculpture, Flemish painting and sculpture, Italian Renaissance painting and sculpture, Dutch Golden Age painting, 17th-century French art, Neue Sachlichkeit art, and Mexican art of the 1920s and 1930s. Some individuals that influenced Tooker include Italian artists Paolo Uccello and Piero della Francesca; American artists Jared French, Edward Hopper, Paul Cadmus, Honoré Desmond Sharrer, and Henry Koerner.

Early in Tooker's career, his work was often compared with painters such as Andrew Wyeth, Edward Hopper, and his close friends Jared French and Paul Cadmus.

=== Artistic career ===
His most well-known paintings carry strong social commentary, and are often characterized as his "public" or "political" pieces. Some of these include: The Subway (1950), Government Bureau (1955–1956), The Waiting Room (1956–1957), Lunch (1964), Teller (1967), Waiting Room II (1982), Corporate Decision (1983), and Terminal (1986). These works are particularly influential, because they draw from universal experiences of modern, urban life. Many portray visually literal depictions of social withdrawal and isolation. Modernity's anonymity, mass-production, and fast pace are cast under an unforgiving, bleak, shadow-less light that conveys a sense of foreboding and isolation. The use of many strong straight lines culminates in oppressively ordered, rectilinear architecture. This precise geometric architecture, constructed to serve the subjects, physically dominates them. Tooker saw modern society as behaving in this same way. Modern life becomes a prison of soulless ritual devoid of individuality in Landscape with Figures (1966). Space is often compressed, as in Ward (1970–1971), with patients' beds lined head-to-foot with very little walking space, such that humanity is confined to strictly organized grids. These images convey a sense of overwhelming silence in the lack of control each individual portrayed has over their depicted situation. The people Tooker depicts are rarely overcome by emotion, never strut, and seldom convey individuality. Rather, they shuffle along in heavy, uniform clothing and seem to act not based on individual will, but based on social conditioning. In Supermarket (1973), nondescript shoppers are surrounded by brightly packaged consumables as easily replicated as the people themselves.

While Tooker's "public" imagery is hostile and solemn, his "private" images are often more intimate and positive. Some of these include the ten images of the Windows series (1955-1987), Doors (1953), Guitar (1957), Toilette (1962), and the Mirror series (1962-1971). Many of these images juxtapose beauty and ugliness, youth and age, in the analysis of the female body. The space is often compressed by a curtain or close-up wall, so that the viewer is confronted by the symbolic identity of the protagonist. Paper lanterns are also a common motif in Tooker's "private" works, often being shared amongst individuals, beacons of soft, warm light that present a pleasant mood to the entire scene. See Garden Party (1952), In the Summer House (1958), and Lanterns (1986). Tooker's style of person is notably recognizable. Often they resemble skeletons and seem frozen in time and space, though certainly not flat. See Divers (1952) or Acrobats (1950–1952). Even as the people depicted in these images are more individualized than those of the "public" pieces, people in a single image are often depicted as variations of the same face, with similar hair colors and physical features that unify and highlight commonalities.

Even these "private" images held social commentary. Voices I (1963) depicts two men, physically identical, separated by a thin door yet unable to communicate. He was deeply concerned with the apparent failure to understand and communicate within American society. While Tooker's figures' facial expressions are rarely particularly emotional, these images carry heavy emotional tones, through the gestures, symbolism, and lighting. See Door (1969–70), Man in the Box (1967), and Night I (1963).

He also created religious works. His elaborately painted seven-panel piece The Seven Sacraments is located in his local church in Windsor, Vermont. Supper (1963) depicts a black man praying over a loaf of bread in front of two white men, easily recognizable as a modern update on the Last Supper. Girl Praying (1977), Orant (1977), Lovers (1982), and Embrace II (1984) are uplifting in their portrayal of genuine spiritual connection. The juxtaposition of emotions in these four images suggest the gravity of spirituality and love for Tooker.

Tooker's first exhibition was "Fourteen Americans" at the Museum of Modern Art in 1946. In 1974, the Fine Arts Museums of San Francisco organized a retrospective called "George Tooker: Paintings, 1947–1973." In 1989, the Marsh Gallery at the University of Richmond held an exhibition dedicated to Tooker. The Addison Gallery of American Art, the National Academy Museum, Pennsylvania Academy of the Fine Arts, the Columbus Museum of Art, and the Whitney Museum of American Art all held exhibitions dedicated to George Tooker. The DC Moore Gallery represents his estate.

Thomas H. Garver, who wrote a monograph on the works of George Tooker, stated: "These are powerful pictures that will stay in the public consciousness. Everyone can say, 'Yes, I've been in that faceless situation,' even if it's just standing in line waiting to apply for a driver's license." His works are particularly impactful because they are so simple and relate to everyday experiences in such a way that the viewer is forced to become more critically aware of their existence.

=== Artistic style ===
In the late 1940s and 1950s, Tooker's work was widely appreciated, but fell out of the spotlight when Abstract expressionism gained popularity. For several decades, Tooker painted with little recognition, completing one to three paintings each year. In the 1980s, he was rediscovered and celebrated as one of the most unique and mysterious American painters of the 20th century.

His artistic theory is evident in the quote: "I don't really think I'm a creator. I feel that I'm a passive vessel, a receptor or translator...The fascinating thing about painting is the discovery." He methodically mixed his colors by hand, using water, egg yolk, and powdered pigment. Each painting was not only painstakingly executed, but deeply intellectually considered. Tempera is a quick-drying, tedious method of painting that is hard to change after being applied, and this deliberate method suited Tooker's disposition and artistic theory. Tooker spent four to six intensely focused hours each day, six days a week, for roughly four months fine-tuning each piece, slowly and deliberately building up color and dimension.

While the themes of his works are simple, the overall impact of each is ambiguous and enigmatic. His works often reveal eerie situations in a mechanical, distancing, and hostile society. These scenes are overlaid with mythical undertones, poetically capturing sensations of dread and unease. The individuals represented are generalized and stripped of detail, with mask-like faces. They often blend sexual and racial features, so they appear more symbols of human beings than actual, unique human individuals. They appear overwhelmed by their environment and clothing, unable to take control of their existence.

Themes his works focus on include love, death, sex, grief, aging, alienation, and religious faith. He devoted numerous paintings to a single theme, investigating many possible variations to fully express the complex ideas conveyed. Tooker grew up in an affluent family, and his work reflects both his privilege and his empathy for those with less.

== Personal life ==
Tooker was in a relationship with the artist Paul Cadmus from 1944 to 1949 and was a part of the PaJaMa artists collective during that time. He is featured, often nude, in many of their images from that period. In the mid-1950s Tooker met his long time partner, painter William R. Christopher, and they lived together in New York City. They moved into a house they had built in Hartland, Vermont in 1960. The couple were involved in the Civil Rights Movement and participated in one of the Selma to Montgomery marches in 1965. He taught at the Art Students League of New York from 1965 to 1968. He spent his winters in Málaga, Spain. A few years after Christopher's 1973 death, Tooker converted to Catholicism. His faith was very important to him, as he was very much involved with his local church. Tooker died at the age of 90 in his Hartland, Vermont, home due to kidney failure.
