= William R. Christopher =

American artist (1924–1973)

- Christopher in his studio, circa 1949
- Born: March 4, 1924; Columbus, Georgia
- Died: December 5, 1973 (aged 49)
- Known for: Painting

William Rodolphus Christopher (March 4, 1924 – December 5, 1973) was an American artist and civil rights activist known for his abstract imagery and collage.

== Early life ==
During WWII, Christopher served as part of the US Naval Reserve. He was a Schmitz-Hille Foundation grantee for several years from 1946 to 1948. Most of Christopher's studies occurred in France. From 1946 to 1947, he was a student at the Sorbonne, Paris. From 1946 to 1948 he studied at the Academy Julian, Paris. In 1947 he was at the Ecole des Americaines, Fontainbleau, France.

== Career ==
Christopher taught at Dartmouth College and served as a representative of the Dartmouth chapter of the NAACP. He participated in the March 13–15, 1965 civil rights demonstrations marching from Selma to Montgomery, Alabama. His painting Dark Mirror was chosen by Martin Luther King Jr. to hang in his office at the Southern Christian Leadership Conference (SCLC) in Atlanta.

== Personal life ==
His longtime partner was the artist George Tooker; the pair lived in New York City until 1960, when they moved to Hartland, Vermont; the couple spent winters in Spain, where Christopher died in December 1973. His papers are held at the Archives of American Art.
