= Hunterdon Medical Center =

Coordinates: 40.531°N 74.861°W

Geography
- Location: Raritan Township, New Jersey, United States

Organization
- Type: Community
- Affiliated university: UMDNJ-Robert Wood Johnson Medical School

Services
- Beds: 178

History
- Founded: 1953

Links
- Website: https://www.hunterdonhealth.org
- Lists: Hospitals in New Jersey

Hunterdon Medical Center is a 184-bed non-profit community hospital located in Raritan Township, New Jersey near Flemington. In Spring 2026, it earned its 13th consecutive A grade by the Leapfrog patient safety organization.

Hunterdon Medical Center was founded in 1946 and opened in 1953, a culmination of efforts by the Hunterdon County Board of Agriculture to provide rural medical care to the region. Hunterdon at the time was the only county in the state without a hospital.

Since 1972 Hunterdon Medical Center been affiliated with the Robert Wood Johnson Medical School at the University of Medicine and Dentistry of New Jersey. A three-year Family Medicine Residency Program is offered through this teaching affiliation.

In July 2026, Kristy Alfano was named the Interim President and CEO.

Hunterdon Medical Center is located near Route 31 on Wescott Drive, named in honor of one of its founders, Lloyd Wescott.

On June 22, 2026, Hunterdon Health and Hackensack Meridian Health announced that they had signed a letter of intent for a proposed merger. The announcement came after the Boards of Trustees of both healthcare systems voted to authorize the organizations to move forward with exploring the merger.
