= Bernard Perlin =

American painter (1918–2014)

- Born: November 21, 1918; Richmond, Virginia, U.S.
- Died: January 14, 2014 (aged 95); Ridgefield, Connecticut, U.S.
- Education: New York School of Design, National Academy of Design, Arts Student League
- Known for: Painting

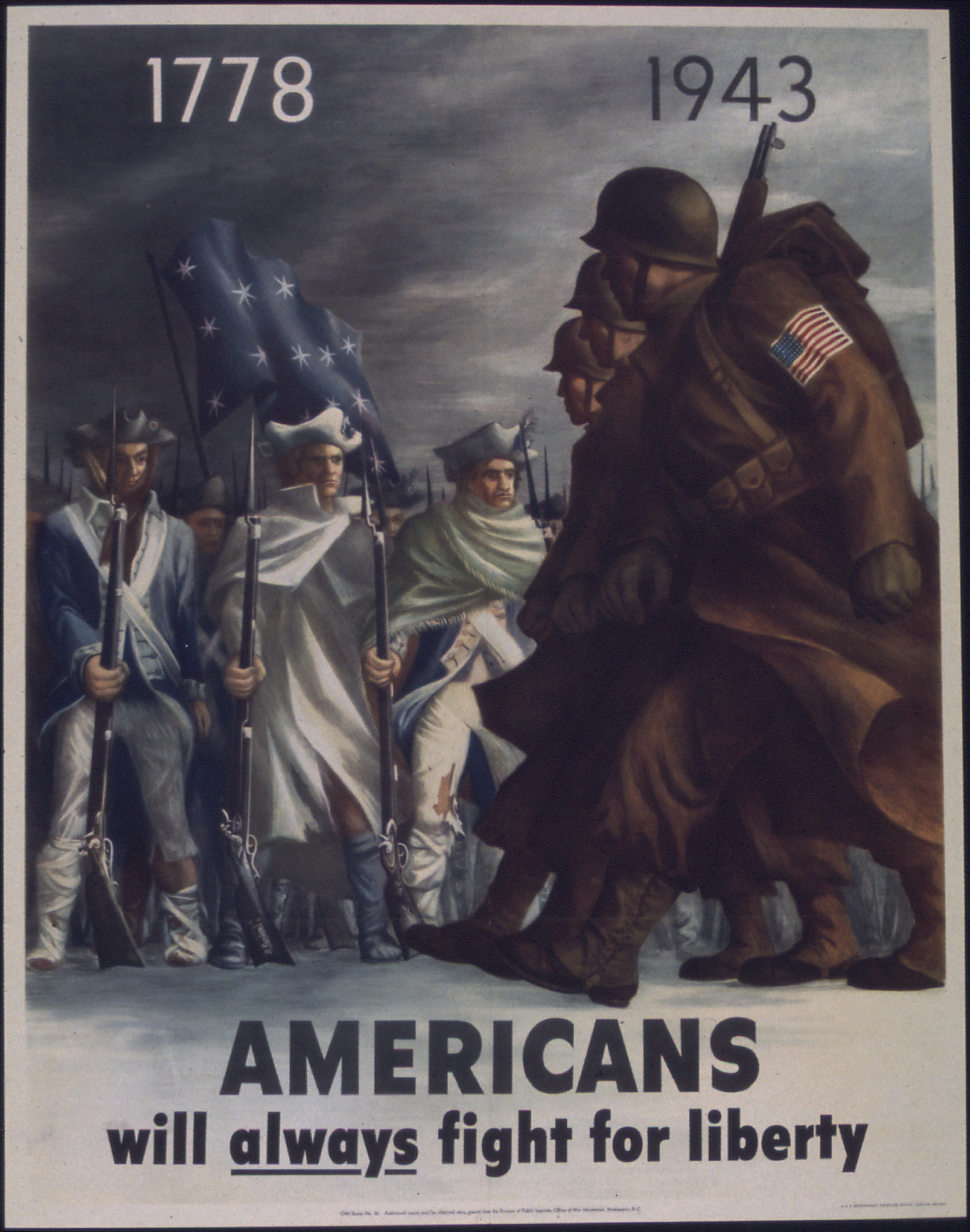
Americans will always fight for liberty (1943), by Bernard Perlin

Bernard Jerome Perlin (November 21, 1918 – January 14, 2014) was an American painter. His style progressed from social realism in the New Deal era through pro-war art and illustration during World War II to magic realism paintings of urban American life, all in a representational style.

== Early life and education ==
Perlin was born in Richmond, Virginia, on November 21, 1918, to Davis and Anna Schireff Perlin. His parents were Jewish immigrants from Russia, and his father died when Perlin was 12 years old. Perlin grew up with two older sisters, Mildred and Jeanette. At the encouragement of a high school art teacher, the family moved to New Jersey and Perlin enrolled in the New York School of Design. He studied there from 1934 to 1936, the National Academy of Design with Leon Kroll in 1937, and then the Arts Student League with Isabel Bishop, William Palmer, and Harry Sternberg until 1940. In 1938, he was awarded the Kosciusko Foundation Award to study in Poland, where photographs in and around Krakow unwittingly captured Jewish communities on the brink of annihilation.

== Career ==
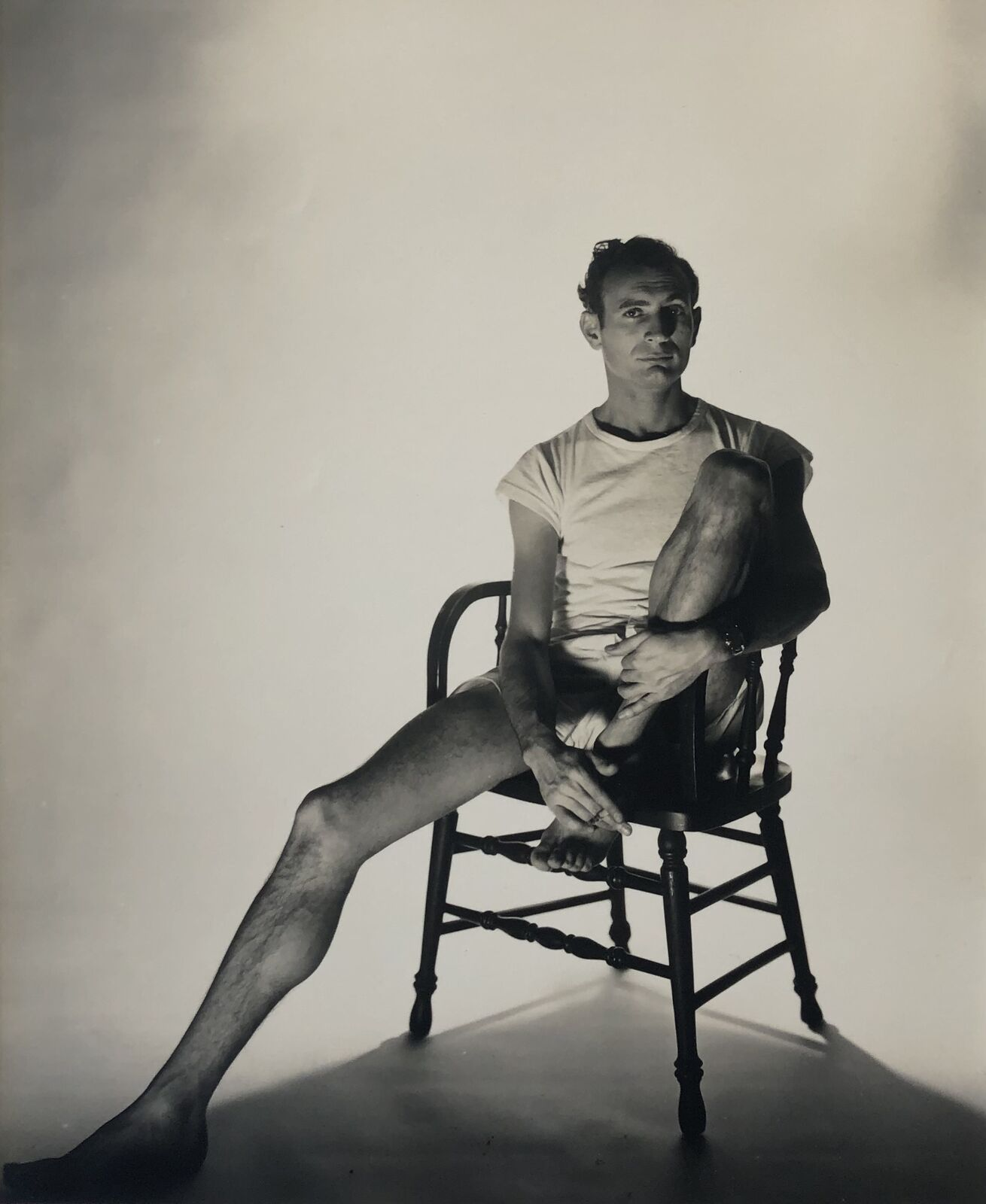
Bernard Perlin, c. 1950, photographed by George Platt Lynes

Perlin was rejected from service in the United States military because he was openly gay. He entered the graphics department of the Office of War Information in 1942, creating pro-war propaganda popular in the United States. The department was shut down in 1943 due to budgetary issues.

He continued his focus on war as an artist-correspondent for Life Magazine from 1943–1944 and then again for Fortune Magazine in 1945. As an artist-correspondent for Life, he brought back to the U.S. the first news and sketches obtained in Greece since the German occupation began in 1941.

His two most notable wartime pieces, both created in 1943, are arguably his "Let Em Have It" war bonds ad, which depicts a soldier throwing a grenade, and "Americans Will Always Fight for Liberty," a painting of World War II soldiers marching in front of Continental Army soldiers.

In 1939, he painted a country scene on a post office wall for the US Treasury. After the war, his work began to focus on magic realism, aiming to capture special moments in everyday life. He produced his most famous work, Orthodox Boys, in 1948. The painting depicts two Jewish boys standing in front of a subway graffiti backdrop. He also produces works such as, The Garden, and The Leg. In 1950, it was the first postwar work by an American artist to be acquired by Tate.

Perlin moved to Italy for six years, and his work became more brightly colored. After moving back to New York City, Perlin grew distasteful towards the competitive culture of the city's art scene. He moved to Ridgefield, Connecticut, and continued to paint until the 1970s. After several years of retirement, a friend encouraged Mr. Perlin back to the canvas in 2012, and after completing two new pieces the Chair and the Maiden Gallery (New York City) hosted a retrospective of Mr. Perlin's work in 2013.

In 1968, Bernard Perlin commemorated Mayor Richard J. Daley and the 1968 Democratic National Convention, which was held in Chicago, in a work entitled Mayor Daley. This example of Perlin's work has been used by educators to teach about the Vietnam War. The painting is currently at the Columbus Museum of Art.

== Personal life ==
In 1955 Perlin met fashion model Edward Newell, whom he formally married at age 91 in 2009. The two had an open relationship, and In 1976 Perlin fell in love with cardiologist Bernhard Lisker, whom he cared for when Lisker was diagnosed with AIDS until his death in 1986. Devastated by the loss, Perlin stopped painting until 2000, during which time he took up growing flowers.

Perlin died on January 14, 2014, at his home in Ridgefield.

== Awards and honors ==
He received Guggenheim Fellowships in 1954 and 1959. He received a 1964 award from the National Institute of Arts and Letters, and in 1994, was inducted into the National Academy of Design.

== Legacy ==
His work is in a number of distinguished museums and libraries, including the Smithsonian Institution, the Museum of Modern Art, the Whitney Museum of American Art, the Pennsylvania Academy of the Fine Arts, Art Institute of Chicago, and the Pritzker Military Museum & Library.

A retrospective of his life and work, Against The Grain: The Remarkable Life of Artist Bernard Perlin, was exhibited at the Jewish Museum Milwaukee in 2024-2025.
