= Glenway Wescott =

American poet, novelist and essayist (1901–1987)

- Born: April 11, 1901; Kewaskum, Wisconsin, US
- Died: February 22, 1987 (aged 85); Rosemont, New Jersey, US
- Education: University of Chicago
- Occupations: Poet; writer; novelist
- Partner(s): Monroe Wheeler; Marcel Khill
- Relatives: Lloyd Wescott (brother)

Glenway Wescott (April 11, 1901 – February 22, 1987) was an American poet, novelist, and essayist. A figure of the American expatriate literary community in Paris during the 1920s, Wescott was openly gay. His relationship with longtime companion Monroe Wheeler lasted from 1919 until Wescott's death.

== Early life ==
External audio
- Glenway Wescott's Images of Truth, 13:50, Wescott begins at 2:00, WNYC, 1962

Wescott was born on a farm in Kewaskum, Wisconsin, in 1901. His younger brother, Lloyd Wescott, was born in Wisconsin in 1907. He studied at the University of Chicago, where he was a member of a literary circle including Elizabeth Madox Roberts, Yvor Winters, and Janet Lewis, but left after contracting Spanish flu.

Wescott travelled to Santa Fe to recover from Spanish flu, where he wrote his first published poetry collection, titled The Bitterns. Although he began his writing career as a poet, he is best known for his short stories and novels, notably The Grandmothers (1927), which received the Harper Novel prize, and The Pilgrim Hawk (1940).

== Career ==
Wescott (left) and Monroe Wheeler (right) in 1928

Wescott lived in Germany (1921–1922) and in France (c. 1925–1933), where he mixed with Gertrude Stein and other members of the American expatriate community. Wescott was the model for the character Robert Prentiss in Ernest Hemingway's The Sun Also Rises. After meeting Prentiss, Hemingway's narrator, Jake Barnes, confesses, "I just thought perhaps I was going to throw up." In The Autobiography of Alice B. Toklas (1933), Gertrude Stein wrote about him, "There was also Glenway Wescott, but Glenway Wescott at no time interested Gertrude Stein. He has a certain syrup, but it does not pour."

Wescott and Wheeler returned to the United States and maintained an apartment in Manhattan with photographer George Platt Lynes, whom they had met in France in 1926. When his brother Lloyd moved to a dairy farm in Union Township, near Clinton in Hunterdon County, New Jersey, in 1936, Wescott, along with Wheeler and Lynes, took over one of the farmhand houses and named it Stone-Blossom. Lynes ended his relationship with Wescott and Wheeler in 1943 to be with his studio assistant, Jonathan Tichenor. Nevertheless, Wescott was at Lynes' bedside when he died of lung cancer in December 1955.

His novel, The Pilgrim Hawk: A Love Story (1940), was praised by the critics. Apartment in Athens (1945), the story of a Greek couple in Nazi-occupied Athens who must share their living quarters with a German officer, was a popular success. From then on he ceased to write fiction, although he published essays and edited the works of others. In her essay on The Pilgrim Hawk, Ingrid Norton writes, "After...Apartment in Athens, Wescott lived until 1987 without writing another novel: journals (published posthumously as Continual Lessons) and the occasional article, yes, but no more fiction. The Midwest-born author seems to slide into the golden handcuffs of expatriate decadence: supported by the heiress his brother married, Barbara Harrison Wescott; surrounded by literate friends; and given to social drinking and letter-writing.

=== Later life ===
In 1959, when his brother Lloyd acquired a farm near the village of Rosemont in Delaware Township, Hunterdon County, New Jersey, Wescott moved into a two-story stone house on the property, dubbed Haymeadows. In 1987, Wescott died of a stroke at his home in Rosemont and was buried in the small farmer's graveyard hidden behind a rock wall and trees at Haymeadows. Monroe Wheeler was buried alongside him following his death a year later.

== Books ==
- The Bitterns (1920) poems
- The Apple of the Eye (1924) novel
- Natives of Rock (1925) poems
- Like a Lover (1926) stories
- The Grandmothers (1927) novel [Published as A Family Portrait in England]
- Goodbye, Wisconsin (1928) stories
- The Babe's Bed (1930) short story [Published as a stand-alone chapbook]
- Fear and Trembling (1932) essays
- A Calendar of Saints for Unbelievers (1932) nonfiction
- The Pilgrim Hawk (1940) novel
- Apartment in Athens (1945) novel
- Images of Truth (1962) essays
- Continual Lessons: Journals, 1937-55 (posthumous, 1991)
- A Visit to Priapus (posthumous, 2013) stories

== Film adaptations ==
In 2011, Apartment in Athens was adapted into a film of the same name by Italian director Ruggero Dipaola.
