= George Platt Lynes =

American photographer (1907–1955)

- Born: April 15, 1907; East Orange, New Jersey, U.S.
- Died: December 6, 1955 (aged 48); New York City, U.S.
- Education: Berkshire School; Yale University
- Known for: Photography

George Platt Lynes (April 15, 1907 – December 6, 1955) was an American fashion and commercial photographer who worked in the 1930s and 1940s. He produced photographs featuring many gay artists and writers from the 1940s that were acquired by the Kinsey Institute.

== Early life ==
Born in East Orange, New Jersey to Adelaide Sparkman and Joseph Russell Lynes. His younger brother was Joseph Russell Lynes, Jr. Lynes spent his childhood in New Jersey but attended the Berkshire School in Massachusetts, where he was a classmate of Lincoln Kirstein. He was sent to Paris in 1925 with the idea of better preparing him for college. His life was forever changed by the circle of friends that he would meet there including Gertrude Stein, Glenway Wescott, and Monroe Wheeler. He attended Yale University in 1926, but dropped out a few months later to move to New York City.

== Career ==
Lynes returned to the United States with the idea of a literary career and he even opened a bookstore in Englewood, New Jersey in 1927. He first became interested in photography not with the idea of a career, but to take photographs of his friends and display them in his bookstore.

Returning to France the next year in the company of Wescott and Wheeler, he traveled around Europe for the next several years, always with his camera at hand. He developed close friendships within a larger circle of artists including Jean Cocteau and Julien Levy, an art dealer and critic. Levy would exhibit his photographs in his gallery in New York City in 1932 and Lynes would open his studio there that same year.

=== Commercial work ===
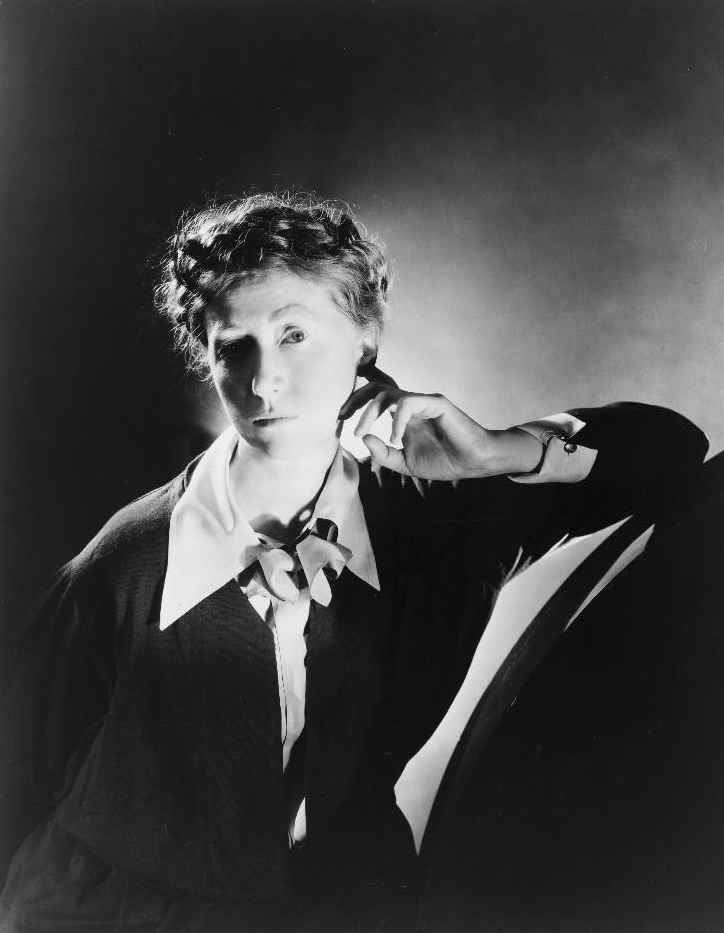
Photograph of Marianne Moore taken by Lynes in 1935.

He was soon receiving commissions from Harper's Bazaar, Town & Country, and Vogue including a cover with perhaps the first supermodel, Lisa Fonssagrives. In 1935, he was asked to document the principal dancers and productions of Kirstein's and George Balanchine's newly founded American Ballet company (now the New York City Ballet).

=== Private collection ===
He was also most notably friends with Katherine Anne Porter, author of the novel Ship of Fools, whom he often enjoyed photographing wearing elaborate evening gowns and occasionally reenacting Shakespeare.

During his lifetime, Lynes amassed a substantial body of work involving nude and homoerotic photography. In the 1930s, he began taking nudes of friends, performers, and models, including a young Yul Brynner, although these remained private, unknown, and unpublished for years. Over the following two decades, Lynes continued his work in this area passionately, albeit privately.

In the late 1940s, Lynes became acquainted with Dr. Alfred Kinsey and his Institute in Bloomington, Indiana. Kinsey took an interest in Lynes's work, as he was researching homosexuality in America at the time. A large number of Lynes's nude and homoerotic works were sent to the Kinsey Institute before his death in 1955. The Kinsey collection represents one of the largest single collections of Lynes's work.

== Personal life ==
For over ten years, Lynes had a love affair with both the curator Monroe Wheeler and the writer Glenway Wescott (1901–1987). He later got together with his studio assistant and, after he died in World War II, Lynes moved in with the younger brother of the assistant.

=== Los Angeles ===
Lynes was in Los Angeles from 1946-1948, living both before and after in New York City. He first visited to vacation and meet some friends he knew there including novelists Katherine Anne Porter and Christopher Isherwood, and a socialite he knew from Paris, Bernardine Szold Fritz. Upon arriving there he met painter Mai-Mai Sze, costume designers Irene Sharaff and Adrian, and Adrian's wife Janet Gaynor. He also did portraits of the writers Thomas Mann and Aldous Huxley. After meeting all these people within a few weeks of his first visit, he decided to relocate from New York to Los Angeles to explore the arts scene there. Lynes still had commissions for photography with Vogue through their art director Alexander Liberman After moving to Los Angeles, Lynes reconnected with socialite Denham Fouts, whom he had photographed in New York in the 30s, and the two exchanged social networks.

=== Death ===
By May 1955, Lynes had been diagnosed with terminal lung cancer. Before his death, he transferred many of his photographs and his negatives containing male nudes to the Kinsey Institute. "He clearly was concerned that this work, which he considered his greatest achievement as a photographer, should not be dispersed or destroyed...We have to remember the time period we're talking about—America during the post-war Red Scare..."

After a final trip to Europe, Lynes returned to New York City, where he died in 1955.

== Legacy ==
=== Film ===
- Hidden Master: The Legacy of George Platt Lynes (2023) is a full-length documentary about Lynes.

=== Novel ===
- Donald Windham's novel Tanaquil (1972) is a roman à clef about the life of Lynes.

== Exhibitions ==
=== Solo ===
- 1932, Julian Levy Gallery, New York, NY
- 1940, Nelson Art Gallery, Kansas City, MO
- 1960, Portraits by George Platt Lynes, The Art Institute of Chicago, Chicago, IL
- 1980, Fleeting Gestures: Treasure of Dance Photography, Institute of Contemporary Art, University of Pennsylvania, Philadelphia, PA
- 1993, George Platt Lynes: A New Look, Wessel + O'Connor Fine Art, New York, NY
- 1993, George Platt Lynes: Photographs from the Kinsey Institute, Grey Art Gallery at New York University, New York, NY
- 1997 George Platt Lynes, Wessel + O'Connor Fine Art, New York, NY
- 2003, George Balanchine and his Dancers: the Ballet Photography of George Platt Lynes, The Kinsey Institute Gallery, Bloomington, IN
- 2005, Fashioning Celebrity: Photographs of George Platt Lynes, Harry Ransom Center, Austin, TX
- 2005, George Platt Lynes, Wessel + O'Connor Fine Art, New York, NY
- 2008, Vintage Ballet Photographs, Craig Krull Gallery, Santa Monica, CA
- 2011, George Platt Lynes, Throckmorton Fine Art, New York, NY
- 2012, George Platt Lynes, Steven Kasher Gallery, New York, NY
- 2014, George Platt Lynes, Wessel + O'Connor Fine Art, Lambertville, NJ
- 2019, Sensual/Sexual/Social: The Photography of George Platt Lynes, Newfields, Indianapolis, IN

=== Group ===
- 1932, Murals by American Painters and Photographers, Museum of Modern Art, New York, NY
- 1937, Fantastic Art, Dada, Surrealism, Museum of Modern Art, New York, NY
- 1951, Abstraction in Photography, Museum of Modern Art, New York, NY
- 1977, documenta 6, Documenta, Kassel, Germany
- 1992, Figure/Form: The Nude in 20th Century Photography, Jan Kesner Gallery, Los Angeles, CA
- 1992, Classic Dualities: The Photographs of Len Prince taken at the Tampa Museum of Art, Fay Gold Gallery, Atlanta, GA
- 1999, Figurescapes, Radiant Light Gallery, Portland, ME
- 2001, Interwoven Lives: George Platt Lynes and his Friends, DC Moore Gallery, New York, NY
- 2002, Mirror, Mirror, on the Wall, Art Gallery of Ontario, Toronto, Ontario, Canada
- 2003, Flesh Tones – 100 Years of the Nude, Robert Mann Gallery, New York, NY
- 2003, Artseal Gallery Photo SF Preview, Artseal Gallery, San Francisco, CA
- 2003, Herb Ritts Private Collection, Fahey/Klein Gallery, Los Angeles, CA
- 2003, Boys of Summer, ClampArt, New York, NY
- 2005, Summer Skin, Stephen Cohen Gallery, Los Angeles, CA
- 2005, From the Source, Fashion Photographs, Corkin Gallery, Toronto, Ontario, Canada
- 2005, Beyond Real Part 1 Dressing Up, Australian Centre for Photography, Sydney, Australia
- 2005, 20th Anniversary Show, Wessel + O'Connor Fine Art, New York, NY
- 2006, American Icons, Corkin Gallery, Toronto, Ontario, Canada
- 2006, Busy going crazy: The Sylvio Perlstein Collection, La Maison Rouge, Paris, France
- 2007, Igor Strawinsky – ich muss die Kunst anfassen, Museum der Moderne Rupertinum, Salzburg, Austria
- 2007, VIP, National Gallery of Australia, Canberra, Australia
- 2007, Classic Beauty: Part 2 Photographs of the Male Nude, Throckmorton Fine Art, New York, NY
- 2007, MODE: BILDER, NRW Forum Kultur und Wirtschaft, Düsseldorf, Germany
- 2008, Vintage / Vantage, Wessel + O'Connor Fine Art, New York, NY
- 2008, Pre-Revolutionary Queer: Gay Art and Culture Before Stonewall, The Kinsey Institute, Bloomington, IN
- 2010, Flirting with Bling, Corkin Gallery, Toronto, Ontario, Canada
- 2010, Nature & Nurture: Exploring Human Reproduction from Pregnancy through Early Childhood, The Kinsey Institute, Bloomington, IN
- 2010, Staff Picks 2010, Howard Greenberg Gallery, New York, NY
- 2010, 25 Years / 25 Works, Wessel + O'Connor Fine Art, Washington, D.C.
- 2011, Narcissus Reflected, Fruitmarket Gallery, Edinburgh, Scotland
- 2011, An Intimate Circle, DC Moore Gallery, New York, NY
- 2011, Psyche & Muse: Creative Entanglements with the Science of the Soul, Beinecke Library at Yale University, New Haven, CT
- 2013, Fashion: Photography from the Condé Nast Archives, Fondazione Forma per la Fotografia, Milan, Italy
- 2019, Sex Crimes, ClampArt, New York, NY

== Collections ==
- Musée des beaux-arts du Canada, National Gallery of Canada
- Cape Breton University Art Gallery permanent collection in Nova Scotia.
- Centre Pompidou Musée National d́Art Moderne, Paris
- Musée d'Art Moderne et Contemporain, Strasbourg
- The Secret Museum, Montreal
- The Israel Museum, Jerusalem
- The Art Institute of Chicago, Chicago, IL
- Los Angeles County Museum of Art – LACMA, Los Angeles, CA
- Norton Museum of Art, West Palm Beach, FL
- Guggenheim Museum, New York, NY
- National Portrait Gallery, London
