= The Old Order: Stories of the South =

Literary anthology of Katherine Anne Porter

- First edition cover art
- Author: Katherine Anne Porter
- Language: English
- Publisher: Harvest Books (Harcourt, Brace and Company)
- Publication date: 1955
- Media type: Print (paperback)
- ISBN: 978-1-59853-029-2
- OCLC: 2008927625

The Old Order: Stories of the South is a collection of nine works of short fiction and a short novel by Katherine Anne Porter, published in 1955 by Harvest Books, a paperback subsidiary of Harcourt, Brace and Company. The works selected for this volume are assembled from Porter's previously published material.

== Stories ==
The short fiction that comprises The Old Order: Stories of the South are reprints of previously published work by Porter. The first six stories, organized under the heading The Old Order, a story sequence concerns the character Miranda Gay, as does the short novel "Old Mortality." "The Jilting of Granny Weatherall", "He" and "Magic" first appeared in Flowering Judas (1930). "Old Mortality" was originally collected in Pale Horse, Pale Rider: Three Short Novels (1939).

The Old Order

- "The Source" (Accent, Spring 1941)
- "The Journey" (The Southern Review, Winter 1936)
- "The Witness" (Virginia Quarterly Review, January 1935)
- "The Circus" (The Southern Review, July 1935)
- "The Last Leaf" (Virginia Quarterly Review, January 1935)
- "The Grave" (Virginia Quarterly Review, April 1935)

from Flowering Judas and Other Stories (1935)

- "The Jilting of Granny Weatherall"
- "He"
- "Magic"

from Pale Horse, Pale Rider: Three Short Novels (1939).

- "Old Mortality"

== Reception ==
Porter was praised for writing with an especially human style. The Old Order contained many short stories that would win her a Pulitzer Prize for fiction in 1966. This collection of stories served to further her fame and increase her popularity. These stories provided a window into life in the American south at the turn of the twentieth century.

Literary critic Howard Moss in The New York Times Book Review commented:

The closest thing to a spokesman Porter allows herself is a woman called Miranda...found in the eight reminiscences of the South that were originally published in The Leaning Tower."—Literary critic

== Sources ==
- Unrue, Darlene Harbour. 1997. Critical Essays on Katherine Anne Porter. Editor, Darlene Harbour Unrue. G. K. Hall and Company, New York. ISBN 0-7838-0022-3
- Unrue, Darleen Harbour. 2008. Editor in Katherine Anne Porter: Collected Stories and Other Writings. Literary Classics of the United States (Compilation, notes and chronology), New York. The Library of America Series (2009). ISBN 978-1-59853-029-2
- Davis, Barbara Thompson. 1963. Katherine Anne Porter: The Art of Fiction (interview) (Winter-Spring 1963). The Paris Review. Retrieved January 2, 2023. https://www.theparisreview.org/interviews/4569/the-art-of-fiction-no-29-katherine-anne-porter Retrieved January 2, 2023.
- Moss, Howard. 1965. The Collected Stories: A Poet of the Story in Critical Essays on Katherine Anne Porter (1997). Editor, Darlene Harbour Unrue. G. K. Hall and Company, New York. ISBN 0-7838-0022-3
- Schwartz, Edward. 1953. Katherine Anne Porter: A Critical Bibliography. The Folcroft Press, Inc., Forcroft, PA. Reprinted from the Bulletin of the New York Public Library, May 1953. ISBN 9780841475823
