= CBC Literary Prize =

Canadian literary award

The CBC Literary Prize is a Canadian literary award, granted annually in three categories: short stories, poetry, and creative non-fiction. The Award is directed towards Anglophone writers.

== Description ==
The CBC Literary Prize is granted annually in three categories: short stories, poetry, and creative non-fiction. For each category, the winner receives $6,000 and a two-week writing residency at the Banff Center for Arts and Creativity. Four runners-up receive $1,000 each, and all the winning works are published on the CBC Books website.

The Prize was established as a partnership between the Canadian Broadcasting Corporation, the Canada Council for the Arts and enRoute, Air Canada's inflight magazine. The Canada Council for the Arts has stated that, "these awards have brought to the public's attention many talented young people who have since gone on to become established writers."

Notable previous winners include writers Michael Ondaatje, W.D. Valgardson, and Gwendolyn MacEwen, as well as poets Don Domanski, Mary di Michele, and diplomat Charles Ritchie. Author Carol Shields wrote in a letter to CBC's chairperson that winning the CBC Literary Prize was fundamental to her career as a writer.

== Winners ==
The list of winners of the CBC Literary Prize include:

Year	Short Story Prize	Poetry Prize	Creative Non-fiction Prize
1979	Les Rites by Shaun Virgo	A New Romance by David McFadden The Pat Lowther Poem by Gail McKay	My Cousin Gerald by Charles Ritchie (memoir)
1980	A Matter of Balance by W.D. Valgardson	Mimosa by Mary Di Michele Birds by Bill Bissett	Aga Dawn by Bill Schermbrucker (memoir)
1981	The Leaving by Budge Wilson	The Cave of Trophonius by Francis Sparshott	The Fifth Man by Ronald R. Jeffels (memoir)
1982	The Passions of Lalla by Michael Ondaatje The Hen's Castle by Alice Tomlinson (children's story)	Summer's Drug by Roo Borson	Jupiter's Feet: A Love Story by Rachel Wyatt (radio drama) A Taste of the Sweet Apple by Larry Snyder (radio drama)
1983	The Other Country by Gwendolyn MacEwen Once Upon A Village by Christel Kleitsch (children's story)	Catchpenny Poems by David Helwig	Women Waiting by Carol Shields (radio drama)
1984	An Interview by Ernst Havemann To the Mountains by Morning by Diana Wieler (children's story)	Technologies/Installations by Kim Maltman	Stations by John Gregory (drama)
1985	Mrs. Putnam at the Planetarium by Janice Kulyk Keefer	Southeasterly by Andrew Wreggitt The Blue Roofs of Japan by Robert Bringhurst	Ratzlaff vs. the Creator by Eric Nicol (radio drama)
1986	The Wind by Janice Kulyk Keefer	A Natural History of Southwestern Ontario by Christopher Dewdney	Mortal by Cordelia Strube (radio drama)
1987	Dream Land by Carol Windley	Angels of Silence by Lorna Crozier	Seiche by W.D. Valgardson (radio drama)
1988	A Van for Violet by Ernst Havemann	Spring Descending by Michael Harris	The Demon by Matthew Decter (radio drama)
1989	Peggy Lee in Africa by Patrick Roscoe	A Glossary of the Intertext by Stephen Scobie	Hungry Ghosts by Louise Young
1990	Hoodlums by Irena Friedman Karafilly	Human Acts by Heather Spears	Leaving the Farm by Ross Klatte
1991	--	--	--
1992	Elizabeth by John Givner	Captain Kintail and The Church Not Made with Hands by John Terpstra	Shame and Pleasure by Amy Friedman
1993	The Girl with the Bell Necklace by Gail Anderson-Dargatz	Eleven Paintings by Mary Pratt by Diana Brebner	A Careful Man by Carolyn Smart
1994	In the Water, Like This by Gayla Reid	Poems by Roger Greenwald	The Suit by Norman Doidge
1995	Bolero by Frances Itani	Kicheraboo, We Are Dying by John B. Lee	Flight by Judith Kalman
1996	Poached Egg on Toast by Frances Itani	The Gold Luck of Carp by Susan Musgrave	Jungle Fever by Jamie Zeppa
1997	Satya by Shauna Singh Baldwin	Hoar Frost by Roberta Rees	Hair by Elaine Kalman Naves
1998	Where It Comes From, Where It Goes by Bill Gaston	One Version by Suzanne Buffam	Boo by Timothy Wilson
1999	How can men share a bottle of vodka by David Bergen	Drowning Water & Other Poems by Don Domanski	Tunnels by Roberta Rees
2000	--	--	--
2001	Between Wars by Camilla Gibb	Poems for Carl Hruska by Erin Noteboom	A Desert Romance by David Tycho
2002	The Last Shot by Leon Rooke	Once a Murderer: Poems for Three Voices by Zoë Landale	Dents in the Laurentians by Roger Greenwald
2003	The Lost Boy by Jane Eaton Hamilton	Selections from Muybridge's Horse by Rob Winger	Girl Afraid of Haystacks (A story of travel and exile) by Stephen Osborne
2004	The Point David Made Earlier by Michael Winter	The Workshop by Asa Boxer	The Bus to Loja by Montana Jones
2005	The Chorus by Erin Soros	The Mind's Eye by Alison Pick	I, Witness by Kim Echlin
2006	The People Who Love Her by Amy Jones	A Walker in the City by Méira Cook	The Occupations of Muriel Thompson by Leona Theis
2007	White by Lee Kvern	Sundress, Fortress by Jeramy Dodds	In a Garden by Shelagh Plunkett
2008	Circus by Claire Battershill	Outskirts by Sue Goyette	Columbus Burning by Sarah de Leeuw
2009	Badger by Donald Ward	Us unclean by Michael Langton	The Rise by Marian Botsford Fraser
2010	Snapshots from My Father's Euthanasia Road Trip, or, Esau by Meghan Adams	To Your Scattered Bodies Go by Brian Brett	My Best Friend by Gina Leola Woolsey
2011	--	--	--
2012	Mine by Daniel Karasik	Great Aunt Unmarried by Sadiqa de Meijer	Holy Bald-Headed by Hilary Dean
2013	The Three Times Rule by Becky Blake	The Trailer by James Scoles	The Gods of Scrabble by Mohan Srivastava
2014	Smiley by Jane Eaton Hamilton	Tar Swan by David Martin	The Hunter and the Swan by Patti-Kay Hamilton
2015	Mountain Under Sea by D.W. Wilson	String Theory by Mark Wagenaar	If You Have a Good Seal, the Chest Will Rise by Carrie Mac
2016	Enigma by David Huebert	African Canadian in Union Blue by Michael Fraser	Adaptation by Leslie A. Davidson
2017	Witching by Alix Hawley	Postcards for my Sister by Alessandra Naccarato	Trust Exercise by Becky Blake
2018	Lipstick Day by Leah Mol	Arrhythmia by Natalie Lim	Easy Family Dinners by Sandra Murdock
2019	Green Velvet by Krzysztof Pelc	Love Poem with Elk and Punctuation, Prairie Storm and Tasbih by Alycia Pirmohamed	Slow Violence by Jenny Boychuck
2020	Gibson by Brenda Damen	Tickling the Scar by Matthew Hollett	Value Village by Jonathan Poh
2021	Kids in Kindergarten by Corinna Chong	James by Lisa Gaston	Umbrella by Chanel M. Sutherland
2022	Beneath the Softness of Snow by Chanel M. Sutherland	Spell World Backwards by Bren Simmers	Advice to a New Beekeeper by Susan Cormier
