= 1987 in poetry =

Nationality words link to articles with information on the nation's poetry or literature (for instance, Irish or France).

== Events ==
- April – First issue of o•blék: a journal of language arts (pronounced "oblique") is published in the United States, founded by Peter Gizzi who co-edits it with Connell McGrath. The magazine stops publishing in 1993.
- August 30 – Poets Paul Muldoon and Jean Hanff Korelitz marry.
- October 16 – Charles Bukowski, fictionalised as alter ego Henry Chinaski, becomes the subject of the film Barfly starring Mickey Rourke released today.
- October – Tony Harrison's poem "V" is broadcast in a filmed version on Channel 4 television in the United Kingdom.
- Joseph Brodsky, a Russian exile who has become a United States citizen, resigns his membership in the American Academy of Arts and Letters in protest over the honorary membership of the Russian poet Evgenii Evtushenko, regarded by Brodsky as a Soviet "yes man".
- Russian poet Anna Akhmatova's Requiem, an elegy about suffering of Soviet people under the Great Purge, composed 1935–61 and first published in the West in 1963, is first openly published complete in book form in the Soviet Union.
- In his 'Notes on the New Formalism', Dana Gioia writes: "the real issues presented by American poetry in the Eighties will become clearer: the debasement of poetic language; the prolixity of the lyric; the bankruptcy of the confessional mode; the inability to establish a meaningful aesthetic for new poetic narrative and the denial of a musical texture in the contemporary poem. The revival of traditional forms will be seen then as only one response to this troubling situation."
- The Dolmen Press in Portlaoise, Ireland, founded in 1951 to provide a publishing outlet for Irish poetry, ceases operations after the death of founder Liam Miller.

== Works published in English ==
Listed by nation where the work was first published and again by the poet's native land, if different; substantially revised works listed separately:

=== Canada ===
- Patrick Lane, Selected Poems
- Irving Layton, Fortunate Exile. Toronto: McClelland and Stewart. ISBN 0-7710-4947-1.
- Irving Layton, Final Reckoning: Poems, 1982-1986. Oakville, Ontario: Mosaic Press.
- Dennis Lee, The Difficulty of Living on Other Planets. Toronto: Macmillan.
- Gwendolyn MacEwen, Afterworlds. Toronto: McClelland and Stewart. ISBN 978-0-7710-5428-0
- Don McKay, Sanding Down the Rocking Chair on a Windy Night
- Raymond Souster, The Eyes of Love. Ottawa: Oberon Press.
- George Woodcock:
  - Beyond the Blue Mountains, An Autobiography, Markham: Fitzhenry & Whiteside, Canada
  - Northern Spring: The Flowering of Canadian Literature, Vancouver: Douglas & McIntyre, scholarship

=== India, in English ===
- Keki Daruwalla, Landscapes ( Poetry in English ), Delhi: Oxford University Press
- Dom Moraes, Collected Poems 1957-1987 ( Poetry in English )
- Jayanta Mahapatra, Selected Poems ( Poetry in English ), New Delhi: Oxford University Press
- Bruce King, editor, Modern Indian Poetry in English - Historical Perspective (first edition), Delhi: Oxford University Press (anthology)

=== Ireland ===
- Ciarán Carson: The Irish for No, including "Cocktails", Oldcastle: The Gallery Press Wake Forest University Press, Irish poet published in the United Kingdom and the United States
- Michael Coady, Oven Lane, Oldcastle: The Gallery Press, ISBN 978-1-85235-020-8
- Paul Durcan, Going Home to Russia, Belfast: The Blackstaff Press
- Eamon Grennan, What Light There Is, including "Totem" and "Four Deer", Oldcastle: The Gallery Press
- Michael Hartnett, A Necklace of Wrens, including "Sneachta Gealai '77" and "Moonsnow '77", Oldcastle: The Gallery Press
- Seamus Heaney, The Haw Lantern, Faber & Faber, Northern Ireland native at this time living in the United States
- Thomas Kinsella, Out of Ireland, Irish poet published in the United Kingdom
- Niall Montgomery, terminal 1: Arrivals, edited by Joseph LaBine, Flat Singles Press, posthumous
- Paul Muldoon, Meeting the British, including "Something Else", Faber and Faber, Irish poet published in the United Kingdom
- Tom Paulin, Fivemiletown, Northern Irish poet published in the United Kingdom

=== New Zealand ===
- Fleur Adcock (New Zealand poet who moved to England in 1963), The Faber Book of 20th Century Women's Poetry, edited by Fleur Adcock. London and Boston: Faber and Faber
- Janet Charman, 2 deaths in 1 night: poems, Auckland: New Women's Press
- Allen Curnow, Look Back Harder: Critical Writings 1935–1984 (Auckland University Press), edited by Peter Simpson, criticism
- Kendrick Smithyman, Are You Going to the Pictures?
- Ian Wedde, Driving into the Storm: Selected Poems, New Zealand

==== Anthologies in New Zealand ====
- Murray Edmond and Mary Paul, editors, The New Poets
- V. O'Sullivan, editor, Anthology of 20th Century New Zealand Poetry, anthology, third edition
- Mark Williams, Caxton Press Anthology of New Zealand Poetry

=== United Kingdom ===
- Peter Ackroyd, The Diversions of Purley, and Other Poems
- Fleur Adcock (New Zealand poet who moved to England in 1963), The Faber Book of 20th Century Women's Poetry, edited by Fleur Adcock. London and Boston: Faber and Faber
- Alan Brownjohn, The Old Flea-Pit
- Ciarán Carson: The Irish for No, Gallery Press, Wake Forest University Press, Irish poet published in the United Kingdom
- David Constantine, Madder
- Carol Ann Duffy, Selling Manhattan
- Gavin Ewart, Late Pickings
- U. A. Fanthorpe, A Watching Brief
- James Fenton, Partingtime Hall (written with John Fuller, 1987), Viking / Salamander Press, comical poems,
- Elaine Feinstein, Badlands, Hutchinson
- Philip Gross, Cat's Whisker
- Tony Harrison, Anno Forty-Two
- Seamus Heaney, The Haw Lantern, Faber & Faber, Northern Ireland native at this time living in the United States
- John Heath-Stubbs, Cat's Parnassus, Aldgate Press, ISBN 1-870841-00-X
- Kathleen Jamie, The Way We Live
- P. J. Kavanagh, Presence
- Thomas Kinsella, Out of Ireland, Irish poet published in the United Kingdom
- Blake Morrison, The Ballad of the Yorkshire Ripper
- Andrew Motion, Natural Causes
- Paul Muldoon, Meeting the British, Irish poet published in the United Kingdom
- Sean O'Brien, The Frighteners (Bloodaxe)
- Tom Paulin, Fivemiletown, Northern Ireland poet published in the United Kingdom
- Fiona Pitt-Kethley, Private Parts
- Ruth Pitter, A Heaven to Find
- Peter Porter, The Automatic Oracle
- Peter Redgrove:
  - In the Hall of the Saurians, shortlisted for the Whitbread Prize for Poetry in 1987
  - The Moon Disposes: Poems 1954-1987
- Carol Rumens, Plato Park
- C. H. Sisson, God Bless Karl Marx
- R.S. Thomas, Welsh Airs
- Anthony Thwaite, Letter from Tokyo
- Charles Tomlinson, The Return
- John Wain, Open Country

==== Criticism, scholarship and biography in the United Kingdom ====
- Elaine Feinstein, A Captive Lion: The Life of Marina Tsvetayeva, Hutchinson

=== United States ===
- A.R. Ammons, Sumerian Vistas
- Maya Angelou, Now Sheba Sings the Song
- Gloria Anzaldúa, Borderlands/La Frontera: The New Mestiza, autobiography, poetry, political, historical and cultural analysis
- John Ashbery, April Galleons
- Marvin Bell, New and Selected Poems, Athenaeum
- Gwendolyn Brooks, Blacks
- Amy Clampitt, Archaic Figure
- Jorie Graham, The End of Beauty
- Seamus Heaney, The Haw Lantern, Faber & Faber, Northern Ireland native at this time living in the United States
- Roald Hoffmann, The Metamict State
- Paul Hoover, The Figures
- Salma Khadra Jayyusi, editor, Modern Arabic Poetry: An Anthology, Columbia University Press
- Lincoln Kirstein, The Poems of Lincoln Kirstein (Atheneum) ISBN 0-689-11923-2
- Harry Mathews, a collection
- Robert McDowell, Quiet Money
- William Meredith, Partial Accounts: New and Selected Poems (winner of the 1988 Pulitzer Prize)
- George Frederick Morgan, Poems: New and Selected, University of Illinois Press
- Mary Oliver, Provincetown (limited edition with woodcuts by Barnard Taylor)
- Gregory Orr, a collection
- Octavio Paz, Collected Poems, 1957–1987, English translation from Spanish
- Ezra Pound and Louis Zukofsky, Pound/Zukofsky: Selected Letters of Ezra Pound and Louis Zukofsky, edited by Barry Ahearn (Faber & Faber)
- Mark Rudman, By Contraries and other poems
- W.D. Snodgrass, Selected Poems: 1957-1987
- Rosmarie Waldrop, The Reproduction of Profiles (New Directions)
- Theodore Weiss, a collection
- C.K. Williams, Flesh and Blood
- Jay Wright, Selected Poems
- Stephen Yenser, The Consuming Myth: The Work of James Merrill, criticism, scholarship

=== Other in English ===
- Edward Brathwaite, X/Self, Jamaica
- Les Murray, The Daylight Moon, Australia

== Works published in other languages ==
=== Denmark ===
- Klaus Høeck, Blackberry Winter, with Asger Schnack; publisher: Gyldendal; Denmark
- Klaus Rifbjerg, Byens tvelys ("Twilight of the City"), Denmark
- Søren Ulrik Thomsen, New Poems

=== French language ===
==== Canada, in French ====
- Jean Royer:
  - Depuis l'amour: Poème, Montréal: l'Hexagone / Paris: La Table rase
  - Le Québec en poésie, Saint-Laurent: Lacombe
  - La poésie québécoise contemporaine (anthologie), Montréal: l'Hexagone/Paris: La Découverte; anthology

==== France ====
- Yves Bonnefoy:
  - Ce qui fut sans lumière
  - Récits en rêve
- Abdellatif Laabi, translator, Autobiographie du voleur de feu, translated from the original Arabic of Abdelwahab al-Bayati into French; Paris: Unesco/Actes Sud

=== India ===
Listed in alphabetical order by first name:

- Chandrakanta Murasingh, Haping Garingo Chibuksa Ringo, Agartala: Shyamlal Debbarma, Kokborok Sahitya Sanskriti Samsad; India, Kokborok-language
- Jayant Kaikini, Shravana Madhyahna, Sagar, Karnataka: Akshara Prakashana, Indian, Kannada-language
- K. Satchidanandan, Ivanekkoodi, ("Him, too"); Malayalam-language
- Nirendranath Chakravarti, Ghumiye Porar Aage, Kolkata: Ananda Publishers; Bengali-language
- Rituraj, Surat Nirat, Jaipur: Panchscheel Prakashan; Hindi-language
- Vasant Abaji Dahake, Shubha-vartaman; Marathi-language

=== Other languages ===
- Alberto Bernabé Pajares, editor, Poetae Epici Graeci, vol. 1, fragments of Ancient Greek epic poetry
- Juliusz Erazm Bolek, Miniatury; Poland
- Christoph Buchwald, general editor, and Jürgen Becker, guest editor, Luchterhand Jahrbuch der Lyrik 1987/88 ("Luchterhand Poetry Yearbook 1987/88"), publisher: Luchterhand Literaturverlag; anthology; Germany
- Odysseus Elytis, Κριναγόρας ("Krinagoras"), Greece
- Ndoc Gjetja, Poezi ("Poetry"); Albania
- Hamid Ismailov, Сад ("Garden") Uzbek language
- Czesław Miłosz, Kroniki ("Chronicles"); Paris: Instytut Literacki; Poland
- Nizar Qabbani, Love Shall Remain, Sir, Syrian, Arabic-language
- M. Swales, editor, German Poetry, anthology with poems in German
- Maire Mhac an tSaoi, An Cion go Dti Seo, including "Caoineadh" and "Ceathruinti Mhaire Ni Ogain", Gaelic-language, Ireland

== Awards and honors ==
=== Australia ===
- C. J. Dennis Prize for Poetry: Lily Brett, The Auschwitz Poems
- Kenneth Slessor Prize for Poetry: Philip Hodgins, Blood and Bone
- Mary Gilmore Prize: Jan Owen - Boy with Telescope

=== Canada ===
- Gerald Lampert Award: Rosemary Sullivan, The Space a Name Makes
- Archibald Lampman Award: Christopher Levenson, Arriving at Night
- 1987 Governor General's Awards: Gwendolyn MacEwan, Afterworlds (English); Fernand Ouellette, Les Heures
- Pat Lowther Award: Heather Spears, How to Read Faces
- Dorothy Livesay Poetry Prize: Diana Hartog, Candy from Strangers
- Prix Émile-Nelligan: Michael Delisle, Fontainebleau and Élise Turcotte, La voix de Carla

=== United Kingdom ===
- Cholmondeley Award: Wendy Cope, Matthew Sweeney, George Szirtes
- Commonwealth Prize for Poetry: Edward Brathwaite of Jamaica
- Eric Gregory Award: Peter McDonald, Maura Dooley, Stephen Knight, Steve Anthony, Jill Maughan, Paul Munden

=== United States ===
- Agnes Lynch Starrett Poetry Prize: David Rivard, Torque
- Aiken Taylor Award for Modern American Poetry: Howard Nemerov
- AML Award for poetry to Robert A. Christmas for "Self-Portrait as Brigham Young"
- Frost Medal: Robert Creeley / Sterling Brown
- Poet Laureate Consultant in Poetry to the Library of Congress: Richard Wilbur
- Pulitzer Prize for Poetry: Rita Dove, Thomas and Beulah
- Rhysling Award:
  - W. Gregory Stewart, Daedalus (Long Form)
  - John Calvin Rezmerski, A Dream of Heredity (Short Form, tie)
  - Jonathan V. Post, Before the Big Bang: News from the Hubble Large Space Telescope (Short Form, tie)
- Ruth Lilly Poetry Prize: Philip Levine
- Whiting Awards: Mark Cox, Michael Ryan
- William Carlos Williams Award: Alan Shapiro, Happy Hour
- Fellowship of the Academy of American Poets: Josephine Jacobsen and Alfred Corn

== Births ==
- Penny Boxall, British poet

== Deaths ==
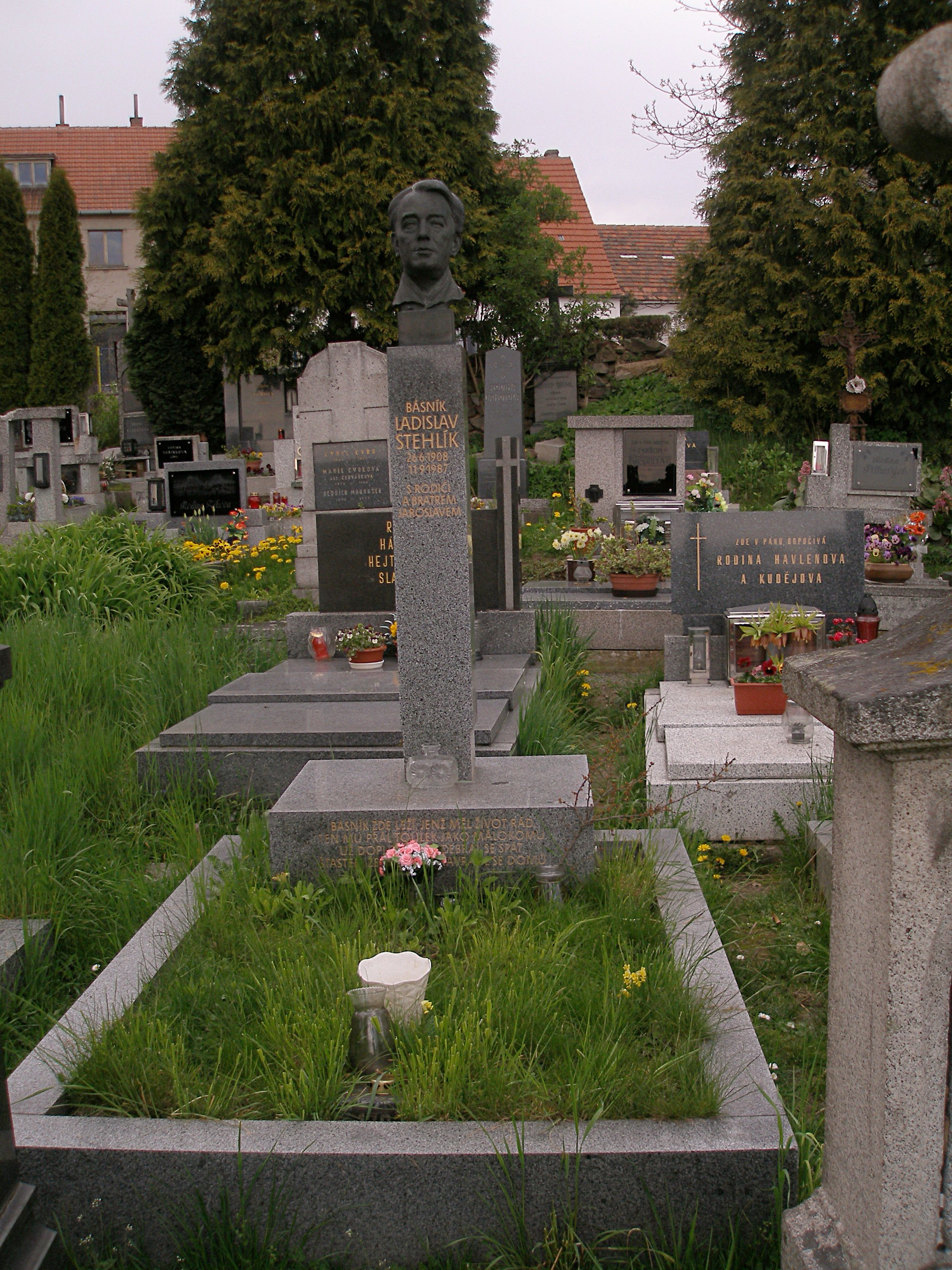
Grave of Czech poet Ladislav Stehlík.

Birth years link to the corresponding "[year] in poetry" article:

- January 14 – Ewart Milne, 83 (born 1903), Irish poet and radical
- February 22 – Glenway Wescott, 85 (born 1901), American novelist and poet, from a stroke
- March 11 – Niall Montgomery, 71 (born 1915), Irish architect, artist, writer, translator and poet
- June 22 – John Hewitt, 79 (born 1907), Irish poet
- August 23 – Samar Sen, 70 (born 1916), Bengali poet and journalist
- September 11 – Ladislav Stehlík (born 1908), Czech poet, writer and painter
- September 16 – Howard Moss, 65 (born 1922), poetry editor of The New Yorker, from a heart attack
- November 6 – John Logan (born 1923), American poet
- November 29 – Gwendolyn MacEwen, 46 (born 1941) Canadian poet and novelist, alcohol-related
- December 29 – Jun Ishikawa 石川淳 pen name of Ishikawa Kiyoshi, Ishikawa, 88 (born 1899), Japanese, Shōwa period modernist author, translator and literary critic
- Also – Vaughan Morgan (born 1907), New Zealand shepherd-poet

== See also ==
- Poetry
- List of years in poetry
- List of poetry awards
