= Holiday (short story) =

- Short story by Katherine Anne Porter
- Country: United States
- Language: English

Publication
- Published in: The Atlantic Monthly
- Publication date: December 1960

"Holiday" is a short story by Katherine Anne Porter which first appeared in The Atlantic Monthly in December 1960. The work is included in The Collected Stories of Katherine Anne Porter (1965). The story received the O. Henry Memorial Award in 1962.

== Background ==
Porter visited a German farming community in east Texas with her sister in 1924, which provided the setting for the story. Her sojourn in the country coincided with a period of emotional distress for Porter, as her difficult marriage with John Henry Koontz was ending. Porter acknowledged her difficulties in developing its narrative:

"Holiday" represents one of my prolonged struggles, not with questions of form and style, but my own moral and emotional collision with a human situation I was too young to cope with at the time it occurred."

Failing to devise a satisfactory ending to the story, she abandoned the effort in 1924, only to discover these early drafts late in her career. Now in her literary and emotional maturity, she quickly edited the manuscript to produce the work that appeared in The Atlantic Monthly in 1960.

== Plot ==
The story is told from a first-person point-of-view by of a young woman, who, though unnamed, is likely Porter herself, dramatizing a reminiscence from her youth.The narrator seeks a temporary sanctuary from unspecified difficulties, and is advised by a former classmate to spend her spring holiday in an East Texas agrarian community in the home of the Müllers, a prosperous family of second- and third-generation German immigrant-farmers. When the narrator arrives to rent a room in their attic, she finds a bleak landscape, not yet emerging from winter.

The large Müller family, though not inhospitable to their visitor, are fully occupied with the operation of the farm. After the narrator is given a perfunctory introduction to the family, they return to their chores. She is grateful that the clannish German-Americans do not impose upon her: she wishes to reflect in solitude. A keen observer, the narrator takes an interest in discovering the dynamics of the Müller household.

Father Müller is the ideological patriarch of his clan. An avid reader of Das Kapital, he preaches a distorted form of socialism that serves to rationalize his own position as the largest landholder in the county and its chief rentier (accent, italics). A confirmed non-believer, he disparages his wife, daughters and grand-daughters for wishing to attend Lutheran church services. The local farming community, despite their hostility to his atheism, has voted his son-in-law to be local sheriff, fearing that failure to do so would result in a punitive rent increase.

Whereas Father Müller presides over the ideological and business affairs of his family, Mother Müller is the matriarch of the household, organizing and directing the daily activities of her offspring and in-laws. She is openly contemptuous of her husband's atheism, but no less clannish; she wishes her daughters to marry local suitors, so as not to wed outsiders and leave home.

The Müllers enjoy the services of what appears to be a hired servant girl. The servant, named Ottilie, is mute and physically disabled. She serves at all the family meals and performs all manner of tasks on command. The narrator feels sympathy for what she perceives as the physical and mental suffering of the servant. She is astonished when Ottilie, through sign language and an old photograph, reveals that she is the biological daughter of Mother Müller. The fact that Ottilie is socially shunned by her parents and siblings, exposes a brutalizing and inhumane element in the otherwise healthy and self-satisfied Müller clan. Though the children in the family lavish affection on their farm pets, Ottilie is expected to perform her servile duties without emotional recompense.

A destructive rainstorm strikes the farm, flooding the crops and pastures. The Mullers make a desperate effort to rescue their livestock. Exposed to the elements, Mother Müller contracts pneumonia and soon dies. After the flood subsides, funeral arrangements are made, and the entire family departs to attend the ceremony: only Ottilie is left behind. The narrator, witnessing the daughter's anguished and inarticulate grief at the loss of her mother, harnesses up a wagon and with Ottilie goes in pursuit of the funeral procession.

The equipage on the horse and wagon is in such disrepair that their progress is severely hampered. Suddenly the sun breaks through the clouds: spring has arrived. Ottilie begins to laugh compulsively with joy, and the narrator recognizes "her realness, her humanity, this shattered being that was a woman." The narrator has an epiphany, perceiving that her failure to make genuine contact with Ottilie was inherently a universal human condition. Abandoning any endeavor to join the mourners, the two embrace the "lovely, festive afternoon." Both the narrator and Ottilie return to the homestead resigned to, but undaunted by, their socially exiled existences.

== Style and Theme ==
"'Holiday' represents one of Katherine Anne Porter's most strenuous efforts in the short story form. It is one of her most personal and intimate stories, dealing as it does with material that she would have preferred to banish from her consciousness. But everything comes together at last to produce a masterful piece of fiction." Literary critic James T. F. Tanner in The Texas Legacy of Katherine Anne Porter (1990)

The story is representative of one of Porter's thematic preoccupations, in this case the depiction of

"a defective child or helpless individual in a hostile environment.""

"Holiday" is one of only two works of short fiction that Porter developed as a first-person narrative. (the other is "Hacienda"). Here, the first-person point-of-view serves to convey the highly personal nature of the story, a youthful experience understood fully only in hindsight of maturity.

Two "holidays" are experienced in the story: On the one hand is the narrator's temporary sanctuary from her personal or professional troubles, and on the other, a brief, but ecstatic catharsis for the disabled servant Ottilie who is condemned to a life of household drudgery. Neither "holiday" provides a genuine escape for either character. Literary critics Willene and George Hendrick write:

Whether read as a personal narrative or a political parable, the conclusion is a sobering one: the narrator, although giving Ottilie a holiday, can do little for the girl, for the narrator's own holiday would soon end; she would leave the Müller farm, leave Ottilie and the Müllers to their fate, as she goes on hers.

Porter's descriptions of the rural landscape of Texas serve as "pathetic fallacies" reflecting the narrator's emotional ambivalence. Literary critic James T. F. Tanner offers this passage as an example:

Winter in this part of the south is a moribund coma, not the northern death sleep with sure promise of resurrection. But in my south, my loved and never-forgotten country, after her long sickness, with only a slight stirring, an opening of the eyes between one breath and the next, between night and day, the earth revives and bursts into the plenty of spring with fruit and flowers together, spring and summer at once under the hot shimmering blue sky.

== Sources ==
- Tanner, James T. F. 1990. The Texas Legacy of Katherine Anne Porter. Texas Writers Series, Number Three. University of North Texas Press. ISBN 0-929398-22-X
- Hardy, John Edward. 1975. Katherine Anne Porter's "Holiday", Southern Literary Messenger, in Critical Essays on Katherine Anne Porter. 1997. pp. 201–206. Darlene Harbour Unrue, editor. G. K. Hall and Company, New York. ISBN 0-7838-0022-3
- Hardy, John Edward. 1987. Katherine Anne Porter. Frederick Ungar Publishing Company. ISBN 0-8044-2351-2
- Hendrick, Willene and Hendrick, George. 1988. Katherine Anne Porter: Revised Edition. Twayne Publishers. G. K. Hall and Company. ISBN 0-8057-7513-7
- Givner, Joan. 1982. Katherine Anne Porter: A Life. Simon & Schuster. ISBN 0-671-43207-9
