= The Collected Essays and Occasional Writings of Katherine Anne Porter =

1970 book by Katherine Anne Porter

- Author: Katherine Anne Porter
- Language: English
- Genre: Essays
- Publisher: Delacorte Press
- Publication date: 1970
- Publication place: United States
- Media type: Print (hardback & paperback)
- Pages: 496

The Collected Essays and Occasional Writings of Katherine Anne Porter is a book by Katherine Anne Porter published by Delacorte Press in 1970. The anthology includes critical, personal, and biographical essays; three sections of an unfinished work about Cotton Mather; book reviews; letters; and poems.

The Collected Essays, in addition to containing seventeen pieces, includes all thirty-two essays published in The Days Before in 1952. Like The Collected Stories of Katherine Anne Porter and The Never-Ending Wrong, it consists of work Porter had written prior to her long novel Ship of Fools, which was published in 1962.

In his review of the book in The Georgia Review in 1971, E.C. Bufkin wrote, "As a record of her thinking and feeling, the selections cover a period of almost half a century, and the book is a virtual cornucopia."
