= The Leaning Tower and Other Stories =

Short story anthology

- First edition cover art
- Author: Katherine Anne Porter
- Language: English
- Publisher: Harcourt Brace & Company
- Publication date: 1944
- Media type: Print (hardcover)
- Pages: 246
- ISBN: 0-7838-0022-3
- LC Class: PS3531.0752Z54

The Leaning Tower and Other Stories is a collection of nine works of short fiction by Katherine Anne Porter, published by Harcourt, Brace & Company in 1944. The stories also appear in The Collected Stories of Katherine Anne Porter (1965).

== The Stories ==
The original date of publication for those stories that appeared in print before they were collected are listed along with the journal.:

“The Source” (Accent, Spring 1941)
“The Witness” (The Southern Review, Winter 1936)
“The Circus” (The Southern Review, 1935)
“The Journey” (The Southern Review, Winter 1936)
“The Last Leaf” (Virginia Quarterly Review, January 1935)
“The Grave” (Virginia Quarterly Review, April 1935)
“The Downward Path to Wisdom” (Harpers Bizarre, December 1939)
“A Day’s Work” (The Nation, February 10, 1940)
“The Leaning Tower” (The Southern Review, 1941)

== Reviews ==
Contemporary criticism of the collection was mixed, offering praise as well as caveats.

Diana Trilling in The Nation declared that the volume surpassed Porter's earlier short fiction collections. Theodore Spencer of The Sewanee Review wrote: “Miss Porter’s Leaning Tower, following her other works of short fiction, has placed her at the top level of contemporary American fiction.” Orville Prescott in The New York Times considered some of the stories “almost masterpieces”, adding that the volume “is not so impressive as the two earlier volumes [Flowering Judas and other Stories (1935), Pale Horse, Pale Rider (1939)]...Exquisite as these stories are, they all are so slight, so inconclusive, so insubstantial [that] they are strangely unsatisfactory.”

Edward A. Weeks in The Atlantic Monthly wrote: “Nothing much happens in these stories. The people do little to excite your curiosity, or deepen your sympathy. One must respect the sheer virtuosity of Miss Porter’s prose…But style without warmth can be a tedious affair.”

Glenway Wescott of The New York Times Book Review ranked Porter with the upper echelon of American short fiction: “As it appears at present two of our top story writers stand head and shoulders above the rest, Hemingway and Katherine Anne Porter…Miss Porter’s style is, so to speak, perfection…”

== Theme ==
“This is the setting in which Miss Porter is most at home, and one finds in it the origins of that spirit of which the starvation and violation elsewhere make the subjects of her other stories. One recognizes it in the firm little sketches that show the relations between Miranda’s grandmother and her lifelong colored companion, the relations between the members of the family, and the relations between the family and the Negro servants in general. Somewhere behind Miss Porter’s stories there is a conception of a natural human spirit in terms of their bearing on which all the other forces of society are appraised.” —Literary critic Edmund Wilson in The New Yorker, September 23, 1944

Whereas Porter introduced the character Miranda in “Pale Horse, Pale Rider” as a young woman, in The Leaning Tower and Other Stories, Porter resumes her examination of the child Miranda she had developed in “Old Mortality.” Literary critic Edmund Wilson wrote:

Perhaps the most interesting section of Katherine Anne Porter’s work is composed of her stories about women—particularly her heroine Miranda, who figures in two of the three novelettes that make up her previous volume, “Pale Horse, Pale Rider.” The first six stories of “The Leaning Tower” deal with Miranda’s childhood and her family background of Louisianians living in southern Texas. This is the setting in which Miss Porter is most at home, and one finds in it the origins of that spirit of which the starvation and violation elsewhere make the subjects of her other stories.

The household and its members clearly resemble that of Porter's own early biography. Indeed, according to critic Harold Bloom “Miranda [is] Porter’s own surrogate in her fiction” and “the closest thing to a spokesman that Porter allows herself” according to Howard Moss.

== Sources ==
- Bloom, Harold. 1986. Katherine Anne Porter: Modern Critical Views. Chelsea House Publishers, New York. ISBN 0-87754-657-6
- Howard Moss |Moss, Howard. 1965. The Collected Stories: A Poet of the Story in Critical Essays on Katherine Anne Porter (1997). Editor, Darlene Harbour Unrue. G. K. Hall and Company, New York. ISBN 0-7838-0022-3
- Porter, Katherine Anne. 2009. Katherine Anne Porter: Collected Stories and Other Writings. Literary Classics of the United States, New York. The Library of America Series (2009). ISBN 978-1-59853-029-2
- Schwartz, Edward. 1953. Katherine Anne Porter: A Critical Bibliography. The Folcroft Press, Inc., Forcroft, PA. Reprinted from the Bulletin of the New York Public Library, May 1953. ISBN 9780841475823
- Unrue, Darlene Harbour. 1997. Critical Essays on Katherine Anne Porter. Editor, Darlene Harbour Unrue. G. K. Hall and Company, New York. ISBN 0-7838-0022-3
