= Jay Gao =

Chinese Scottish poet and writer

- Born: 1994 (age 31–32); Preston
- Education: University of Edinburgh; Brown University; Columbia University
- Occupation: Poet
- Writing career
- Genre: Poetry
- Notable work: Imperium
- Notable awards: Eric Gregory Award; Somerset Maugham Award
- Website: www.jay-gao.com//

Jay Gao is a poet and writer from Edinburgh, based in New York City.

== Early life and education ==
Jay Gao was born in Preston in 1994 and grew up in Glasgow and Edinburgh. After attending the University of Edinburgh, he later earned his MFA in Literary Arts (Poetry) from Brown University. He is currently a PhD student in English Literature at Columbia University.

== Career ==
Between 2017 and 2022, Gao began publishing under the name Jay G Ying, publishing two poetry pamphlets during this time: Wedding Beasts (2019), shortlisted for the 2019 Callum MacDonald Memorial Award; and Katabasis (2020), winner of the 2019 New Poets Prize, judged by Mary Jean Chan.

In 2018, Gao co-founded the Scottish BPOC Writers Network with Alycia Pirmohamed as an "advocacy and professional development group for Scottish and Scotland-based writers and literary professionals who identify as BPOC (Black people, People of Colour)".

In 2022, his debut poetry collection, Imperium, was published by Carcanet and was subsequently a winner of the 2023 Michael Murphy Memorial Poetry Prize, a Somerset Maugham Award, and an Eric Gregory Award. Imperium was also a runner-up for the 2022 Edwin Morgan Poetry Award and long-listed for the Anglo-Hellenic League Runciman Award.

In 2022, his short story "The Baron and His Volcano" won the 2022 Desperate Literature Short Fiction Prize, a prize that aims to celebrate international writers of experimental fiction.

== Works ==
=== Poetry Collections ===
- 2026: The Dead One, The Unconscious One, Thundering in Your Ear, Thriving Slumber (Nightboat Books, Carcanet Press)
- 2022: Imperium (Carcanet Press)

=== Poetry Pamphlets/Chapbooks ===
- 2024: Bark, Archive, Splinter (Out-Spoken Press)
- 2024: Bark, Archive, Splinter (Belladonna*)
- 2022: TRAVESTY58: Lake Poems (SPAM Press)
- 2020: Katabasis (Smith|Doorstop)
- 2019: Wedding Beasts (Bitter Melon)

== Awards ==
- 2023: Michael Murphy Memorial Poetry Prize (Imperium)
- 2023: Somerset Maugham Award (Imperium)
- 2023: Eric Gregory Award (Imperium)
- 2022: The Desperate Literature Prize for Short Fiction ("The Baron and His Volcano")
- 2022: The London Magazine Poetry Prize ("Sky Soldier")
- 2019: New Poets Prize (Katabasis)
- 2017: The Poetry Book Society Student Poetry Prize ("Scattering")
