= The Collected Stories of Katherine Anne Porter =

1965 book by Katherine Anne Porter

- First edition cover art
- Author: Katherine Anne Porter
- Language: English
- Publisher: Harcourt, Brace & World
- Publication date: 1965
- Media type: Print (hardcover)
- Pages: 495
- ISBN: 978-0156188760
- LC Class: PS3531.O752 A6 1965

The Collected Stories of Katherine Anne Porter is a volume of her previously published collections of fiction and four uncollected works of short fiction.

Published in 1965 by Harcourt, Brace & World, the volume includes 26 works of fiction—all the stories that Porter "ever finished and published" in her lifetime. The Collected Works of Katherine Anne Porter won the Pulitzer Prize for Fiction and the National Book Award for Fiction.

== Stories ==
The Collected Stories of Katherine Anne Porter comprises the works of three earlier volumes —Flowering Judas and Other Stories (1935), Pale Horse, Pale Rider: Three Short Novels (1939) and The Leaning Tower and Other Stories (1944)—and four previously uncollected short stories: "Virgin Violeta", "The Martyr", "The Fig Tree" and "Holiday." The collection includes a brief preface penned by Porter especially for the publication, entitled "Go Little Book."

=== Preface ===
- "Go Little Book"

=== From Flowering Judas and Other Stories (1935) ===
- "María Concepción"
- "Magic"
- "Rope"
- "He"
- "Theft"
- "That Tree"
- "The Jilting of Granny Weatherall"
- "Flowering Judas"
- "The Cracked Looking-Glass"
- "Hacienda"

=== From Pale Horse, Pale Rider (1939) ===
- "Old Morality"
- "Noon Wine"
- "Pale Horse, Pale Rider"

=== From The Leaning Tower and Other Stories (1944) ===
- "The Source"
- "The Witness"
- "The Circus"
- "The Journey"
- "The Last Leaf"
- "The Grave"
- "The Downward Path to Wisdom"
- "A Day's Work"
- "The Leaning Tower"

=== Uncollected stories ===
- "Virgin Violeta" (The Century Magazine, December 1924)
- "The Martyr" (The Century Magazine, July 1923)
- "The "Fig Tree" (Harper's Magazine, June 1960)
- "Holiday" (Atlantic Monthly, December 1960)

== Critical assessment ==
Biographer Darlene Harbour Unrue traces the evolution in the critical appraisal of Porter's oeuvre:

Several important differences are apparent between the reviews of the Collected Stories [and] those of the small volumes of 1930, 1935, 1939 and 1944. Critical opinions and literary tastes had changed over the course of 35 years, and the later reviews reflect in part those changes. The reviews of her work…had become more probing. While most reviewers [of the earlier volumes] failed to grasp Porter's methods and themes, many reviewers in 1965 discerned distinguishing elements in Porter's subjects and techniques…Feminist scholars and critics, emerging early in the decade, began to show interest in Porter's work, correctly identifying mythic feminism in her fiction.

"I beg the reader one gentle favor…please do not call my short novels Novelettes, or even worse, Novellas. Novelette is classical usage for a trivial, dime-store sort of thing; Novella is a slack, boneless, affected word…Please call my works by their right names: we have four that cover every division: short stories, long stories, short novels, novels [and] they seem very clear, sufficient, and plain English."—Katherine Anne Porter in the introduction "Go Little Book", June 14, 1965

Literary critic for The New York Times, Howard Moss comments on the relationship between Porter's style and her subject matter:

The first concern of these stories is not esthetic. Extraordinarily well-formed, often brilliantly written, they are firmly grounded in life…Experience is the reason for their having been written, yet experience does not exist in them for its own sake; it has been formulated, but not simplified…In the best of her work, the factual and the lyrical are kept in perfect balance.

Moss adds that "Miss Porter is a poet of the short story, and she never confuses the issue."

== Sources ==
- Bloom, Harold. 2001. Katherine Anne Porter: Comprehensive Research and Study Guide. Chelsea House Publishers, Broomall, PA. ISBN 0-7910-5941-3
- Moss, Howard. 1965. The Collected Stories: A Poet of the Story in Critical Essays on Katherine Anne Porter Critical Essays on Katherine Anne Porter (1997). Editor, Darlene Harbour Unrue. G. K. Hall and Company, New York. ISBN 0-7838-0022-3
- Porter, Katherine Anne. 2009. Katherine Anne Porter: Collected Stories and Other Writings. Literary Classics of the United States, New York. The Library of America Series (2009). ISBN 978-1-59853-029-2
- Unrue, Darlene Harbour. 1997. Critical Essays on Katherine Anne Porter. Editor, Darlene Harbour Unrue. G. K. Hall and Company, New York. ISBN 0-7838-0022-3
