= María Concepción =

- Short story by Katherine Anne Porter
- Country: United States
- Language: English

Publication
- Published in: The Century Magazine
- Publication date: December 1922

"María Concepción" is a work of short fiction by Katherine Anne Porter first published in The Century Magazine in 1922. The story was collected in The Flowering Judas (1930) and later in Flowering Judas and Other Stories in 1935, each published by Harcourt, Brace and Company. "Maria Concepción" is included with other previously published works in The Collected Stories of Katherine Anne Porter (1965).

== Background ==
In 1920, Porter traveled to Mexico under the auspices of Mexican emigres she had met in New York City shortly after her recovery from the Spanish Influenza in 1919. She arrived in Mexico during the reformist Alvaro Obregon administration in the aftermath of the Mexican Revolution, while the country was still in turmoil. In 1921, amid charges from local authorities that she was fraternizing with Bolsheviks, Porter was compelled to depart the country. Upon completing the story, Porter admitted she "didn't know what to do with it." She mentioned the work to art director George Sill at The Century Magazine and was encouraged to present the piece to the editor Carl Van Doren. Porter recalled:

Carl took it and looked it over right before me and said "I think you're a real writer" and I just went out walking on air. I never said anything about money…the next day George Sill came down in person to Washington Square and handed me a cheque for $600. I was launched!

Porter's "first mature work of fiction", "María Concepción" appeared in The Century Magazine in 1922. It is one of several short stories she set in Mexico.

The story is based on an incident involving a homicide told to Porter by archaeologist William Nevin during her visit to his excavation site near Mexico City in 1920. According to Nevin, a local peasant woman who provided him with meals at the site, was known in the rural community to have murdered her husband's mistress. When Porter encountered the woman she was deeply impressed with the young woman's dignity and self-possession, later commenting: "Here was royalty in every sense of the word." The circumstances of the tragic incident as described to Porter form the narrative for "María Concepción."

== Plot ==
An 18-year-old Indio woman in rural Mexico, Maria Concepción, is married to Juan. who serves as a laborer on an archaeological site operated by an American scientist. Newly pregnant, she cooks for the men. A 15-year-old girl, Rosa, is a local beekeeper. When Maria Concepción discovers that she and Juan are having an affair, she determines to exterminate both her female rival and her own unborn child conceived by Juan.

Juan and Maria Rosa abscond together to join a revolutionary combat unit. Remaining in her village, María Concepción's child dies soon after its birth. After a year's absence, María Rosa and Juan return to the village, where Maria Rosa gives birth to a girl sired by Juan.

Maria Concepción exacts her revenge based on precepts of justice she absorbed from her peasant upbringing and her Catholic training. First, she brutally murders Maria Rosa with a butcher knife. This accomplished, she approaches Juan as a supplicant, and he agrees - secretly fearing her - to act as her protector. The local community provides cover for Maria Concepción when the police make inquiries. She adopts Maria Rosa's child, accepting the infant as her own, and returns dutifully to her rural existence as a young mother.

== Theme ==
"María Concepción" is representative of one of Porter's thematic preoccupations, in this case the depiction of a strong-willed woman "imposing order on domestic chaos."

Critic James T. L Tanner notes an autobiographical element in this narrative, based on the "passivity" of Porter's own father, and informing her thematic material concerning "weak, ineffectual men." Tanner writes:

María Concepción illustrates the power of a determined woman and, incidentally, it shows how a passive male can be dominated by such a determined woman…Maria Concepción does what she has to be done to preserve her place in the world.

The literary character Maria Concepción is more than merely a description of a social type, but Porter's own claim to her competence as an emerging writer. Tanner emphasizes that "Katherine Anne Porter's 'conception' of herself and of her literary art is, therefore, the genuine subject of 'Maria Concepción'...Maria Concepción is one Porter's feminist heroines.

Critics Willene and George Hendrick identify the central theme as "the strength of life over defeated death." This is illustrated in the scene in where the heroine, using a butcher knife, decapitates a chicken with "instinctive serenity."

María Concepción took the fowl by the head, and silently, swiftly drew her knife across its throat, twisting its head off with the casual firmness she might use with the top of a beet.

María Concepción murders the young María Rosa with the same butcher knife when she discovers the pretty girl is mistress to her husband Juan.

Literary critic Debra A. Moddelmog addresses Porter's handling of the moral elements attached to the homicidal, climax of the story. Maria Concepción's murder of Maria Rosa, and her adoption of her rival's child emerges as a moral imperative imposed by the local community, rather than those dictated by colonial imperatives. Moddellmog writes:

Porter suggests that people must have—and must act on—the right to resist a legal system they find unjust, especially when they did not establish that system themselves…The ending of Porter's story affirms this community's judgment that justice has been served and moral order restored [thus] showing a primary principle of the retributivist scheme: criminals are punished on behalf of the people, not on behalf of the state.

== Sources ==
- Alvarez, Ruth M. 1997. Royalty in Exile: Pre-Hispanic Art in Ritual in "Maria Concepción" in Critical Essays on Katherine Anne Porter. pp. 91-98. Editor, Darlene Harbour Unrue. G. K. Hall and Company, New York. ISBN 0-7838-0022-3
- Givner, Joan. 1982. Katherine Anne Porter: A Life. Simon & Schuster. ISBN 0-671-43207-9
- Hardy, John Edward. 1987. Katherine Anne Porter. Frederick Ungar Publishing Company. ISBN 0-8044-2351-2
- Hendrick, Willene and Hendrick, George. 1988. Katherine Anne Porter: Revised Edition. Twayne Publishers. G. K. Hall and Company. ISBN 0-8057-7513-7
- Moddelmog, Debra A. 1993. Concepts of Justice in the Work of Katherine Anne Porter in Critical Essays on Katherine Anne Porter. pp. 63-79. Darlene Harbour Unrue, editor. G. K. Hall and Company, New York. ISBN 0-7838-0022-3
- Tanner, James T. F. 1990. The Texas Legacy of Katherine Anne Porter. Texas Writers Series, Number Three. University of North Texas Press. ISBN 0-929398-22-X
- Unrue, Darleen Harbour. 2008. Editor in Katherine Anne Porter: Collected Stories and Other Writings. Literary Classics of the United States (Compilation, notes and chronology), New York. The Library of America Series (2009). ISBN 978-1-59853-029-2
