= Andrew Battershill =

Canadian writer

- Occupation: Novelist
- Spouse: Suzannah Showler
- Relatives: Claire Battershill (sibling)
- Writing career
- Period: 2010s–present
- Notable awards: ReLit Award (2019)

Andrew Battershill is a Canadian writer who cofounded the online literary magazine Dragnet Magazine with Jeremy Hanson-Finger.

In 2016, his debut novel, Pillow, was longlisted for the Scotiabank Giller Prize and the Sunburst Award, and a finalist for the Kobo Emerging Writer Prize in 2016.

His second novel, Marry, Bang, Kill, won the 2019 ReLit Award for fiction.

Originally from British Columbia, Battershill studied creative writing at the University of Toronto and served as the 2017–2018 Writer-in-Residence at the Regina Public Library. He is the brother of writer Claire Battershill.

== Awards ==
Awards for Battershill's writing
Year	Title	Award	Result	Ref.
2016	Pillow	Scotiabank Giller Prize	Longlist	
2016	Pillow	Sunburst Award	Nominee	
2016	Pillow	Kobo Emerging Writer Prize	Shortlist	
2019	Marry, Bang, Kill	ReLit Award for Fiction	Winner	

== Publications ==
- Pillow (2015, Coach House Books)
- Marry, Bang, Kill (2018, Goose Lane Editions)
