= Flowering Judas and Other Stories =

Short story collection by Katherine Anne Porter

- First edition cover art
- Author: Katherine Anne Porter
- Language: English
- Publisher: Harcourt, Brace & Company
- Publication date: January 1, 1935
- Media type: Print (hardcover)
- Pages: 285
- ISBN: 978-1199817549
- OCLC: 42590039

Flowering Judas and Other Stories is a collection of ten works of short fiction by Katherine Anne Porter, published by Harcourt, Brace and Company in 1935. The volume is an amalgamation of four previously uncollected works and the six stories comprising Porter's first collection, Flowering Judas (1930), also published by Harcourt and Brace. All of these stories appear in The Collected Stories of Katherine Anne Porter (1965).

== Stories ==
The original year of publication is listed below after the titles. The publishers include: The Century Magazine, Transition, New Masses, Gyroscope, Virginia Quarterly Review, Hound & Horn, Harrison of Paris, Scribner's Magazine and The Caravan The first four stories in this list, along with the seventh and the eighth, comprise the contents of the 1930 collection Flowering Judas. The other four were first collected in Flowering Judas and Other Stories.

"María Concepción" (The Century Magazine, December 1922)
"Magic" (Transition, Summer 1928)
"Rope" (The Caravan, 1928)
"He" (New Masses, October 1927)
"Theft" (Gyroscope, November 1929)
"That Tree" (Virginia Quarterly Review, July 1934)
"The Jilting of Granny Weatherall" (Transition, February 1929)
"Flowering Judas" (Hound & Horn, spring 1930)
"The Cracked Looking-Glass" (Scribner's Magazine, May 1932)
"Hacienda" (Virginia Quarterly Review, October 1932)

== Reception ==
With reference to the six stories in the volume first collected in 1930, John Chamberlain of The New York Times wrote: "After five years, the intensity of these stories seems just as important as it did when they were originally published." Commenting on the earliest stories in the collection, Yvor Winters in Hound & Horn wrote: "I can think of no living American who has written short stories at once so fine in detail, so powerful as units, and so mature and intelligent in outlook..."

Critic Eleanor Clark, writing in The New Republic, offered qualified praise for the works in the collection:

Miss Porter is not an easy author. Her scope is limited, and she counteracts this weakness with satire so subtle so pointed and compressed and such perfection of style that one is sometimes forced to concentrate more on the word patterns than on the substance of a story..."

Clark selects three of the stories for special praise—"Flowering Judas", "Maria Concepción" and "The Cracked Looking Glass"—considering these "almost perfect by any standard [achieved through] understatement, rigid selection and sympathetic music in the words..." Regarding "Hacienda", Clark deems the work "superficial...not pointed enough to give contour to any of the people involved."

William Troy of The Nation provided this measured appraisal of the collection:

...The only objection that may be raised is that in certain of the stories, "Hacienda" and "That Tree", there is insufficient crystallization of theme...From this point of view, the most satisfactory items are "Maria Conception" and "The Cracked Looking-Glass" If Miss Porter had written nothing but these two short narratives, she would still be among the most distinguished masters of her craft in this country.

== Sources ==
- Clark, Eleanor. 1935. Flowering Judas and Other Stories. The New Republic, December 1939 in Critical Essays on Katherine Anne Porter. p. 27-28. Editor, Darlene Harbour Unrue. G. K. Hall and Company, New York. ISBN 0-7838-0022-3
- Unrue, Darleen Harbour. 2008. Editor in Katherine Anne Porter: Collected Stories and Other Writings. Literary Classics of the United States (Compilation, notes and chronology), New York. The Library of America Series (2009). ISBN 978-1-59853-029-2
- Unrue, Darlene Harbour. 1997. Critical Essays on Katherine Anne Porter. Editor, Darlene Harbour Unrue. G. K. Hall and Company, New York. ISBN 0-7838-0022-3
- Schwartz, Edward. 1953. Katherine Anne Porter: A Critical Bibliography. The Folcroft Press, Inc., Forcroft, PA. Reprinted from the Bulletin of the New York Public Library, May 1953. ISBN 9780841475823
