= Bill Schermbrucker =

Kenyan Canadian academic and author (1938–2019)

- Born: William Gerald Schermbrucker; 23 July 1938; Eldoret, Kenya
- Died: September 14, 2019 (aged 81); Saturna Island, British Columbia
- Education: University of Cape Town; University of London
- Occupations: Academic and author
- Writing career
- Notable awards: CBC Literary Prize (1980); Ethel Wilson Fiction Prize (1989)

William Gerald Schermbrucker (23 July 1938 — 14 September 2019) was a Kenyan-Canadian academic and author who primarily worked at Capilano College from 1968 to 1998. Before teaching in Canada, Schermbrucker taught in multiple African cities between the late 1950s to mid 1960s. These locations included Cape Town and Kikuyu, Kenya. Between 1973 and 2013, Schermbrucker primarily wrote short stories while he expanded into books.

For some of his publications, Schermbrucker set his works during the Mau Mau rebellion and the Boer War. With Mimosa, Schermbrucker won the 1989 Ethel Wilson Fiction Prize as part of the B.C. Book Prizes. Following his death, his interviews in Saturna Island were made into a four part collection called Making a Living on Saturna.

== Early life and education ==
Schermbrucker was born on 23 July 1938 in Eldoret, Kenya. While he was at Kearsney College, Schermbrucker won awards in drama and literature during 1954. Between the 1950s to 1960s, Schermbrucker attended the University of Cape Town and University of London for his post-secondary education. In the 1960s, Schermbrucker left Kenya and moved to Canada. While in Canada, Schermbrucker attended the University of British Columbia between the 1960s to 1970s on a scholarship.

== Career ==
=== Academic career ===
Prior to his Canadian work experience, Schermbrucker primarily worked as a high school teacher for multiple African cities. During the late 1950s, Schermbrucker began his teaching career in Cape Town before he continued his experience in Nairobi. During the early to mid 1960s, Schermbrucker taught in Kikuyu, Kenya and the University of East Africa.

In 1968, Schermbrucker joined Capilano College as an academic a month before it opened. With Capilano, Schermbrucker taught several writing courses while he remained with the university until 1998. During this time period, Schermbrucker briefly worked as a chairperson and an academic coordinator for Capilano from the early to mid 1970s. Apart from Capilano, Schermbrucker briefly taught in the early 1970s at Genesee Community College.

=== Literary career ===
In 1976, Schermbrucker released The Aims and Strategies of Good Writing. He also published Readings for Canadian Writing Students that year before it was re-released under the name of The Capilano Reader as a 1984 edited version. Schermbrucker consulted The Aims and Strategies of Good Writing and The Capilano Reader as textbooks for one of his writing courses. While at Capilano between 1976 and 1982, Schermbrucker was the editor of The Capilano Review.

From 1973 to 1983, Schermbrucker released fifteen short stories. He assembled five of his previously published stories and three new stories with his 1983 publication of Chameleon and Other Stories. Following his 1988 publication of Mimosa, Schermbrucker had a 1993 work called Motortherapy and Other Stories. During the 2010s, Schermbrucker released Crossing Second Narrows in 2013. Between 2014 and 2019, Schermbrucker conducted interviews for a book on Saturna Island. Following his death in 2019, his interviews were posthumously made into a four part collection titled Making a Living on Saturna. Two books of the collection were released in the early 2020s.

=== Themes ===
For Chameleon and Other Stories, Schermbrucker used the Mau Mau rebellion as the setting while using past events in his life to create the fictional book. With Mimosa, Schermbrucker wrote a "fictionalized memoir about his mother in Africa". In this book, Schermbrucker included the historical timeline ranging from the Boer War to the presidency of Jomo Kenyatta. In Motortherapy and Other Stories, Schermbrucker set his book between the 1950s to 1990s. He also had his stories take place in various African and North American cities. Set around the time of the Vietnam War, Schermbrucker wrote about proposed adjustments in Simon Fraser University and Capilano with Crossing Second Narrows.

== Honors and personal life ==
In 1980, Schermbrucker won the memoirs category of the CBC Literary Prize for Aga Dawn. As part of the B.C. Book Prizes, Mimosa received the Ethel Wilson Fiction Prize in 1989. In 2000, he became an emeritus for Capilano. He died on Saturna Island on 14 September 2019.
