= Edwin Morgan Poetry Award =

Scottish poetry award(s)

The Edwin Morgan Poetry Award Award is a Scottish poetry prize awarded biennially for the best unpublished poetry collection by a Scottish poet under the age of 30. The £20,000 prize is one of the largest in the UK and is administered by the Edwin Morgan Trust. When Scottish poet, Edwin Morgan, died in 2010, he bequeathed one million pounds to create a foundation for young Scottish poets. The Edwin Morgan Trust was established in 2012 to carry out Morgan's bequest.

== List of winners ==
Year	Poet	Publication	Judges
2014	Niall Campbell	Moontide	Jen Hadfield, Stewart Conn
2016	Penny Boxall	Ship of the Line	Jackie Kay, Stewart Conn
2018	Roseanne Watt	Moder Dy	Janice Galloway, John Glenday
2020	Alycia Pirmohamed	Hinge	John Glenday, Kathleen Jamie
2022	Alyson Kissner, Michael Mullen, Roshni Gallagher, Titilayo Farukuoye	Nightshade, Lay Down With Dogs, The Whitby, My Body is Not an Apology	Vahni Anthony Ezekiel Capildeo, Maria Fusco, Gillebride MacMillan, Alycia Pirmohamed, Nadine Aisha Jassat, Jeda Pearl Lewis, Kelly Kanayama, Drew Taylor-Wilson, Fraser MacLeod

== See also ==
- Poetry of Scotland
- List of poetry awards
