= Hound & Horn =

American literary magazine (1927–1934)

Hound & Horn, originally subtitled "a Harvard Miscellany", was a literary quarterly founded by Harvard undergrads Lincoln Kirstein and Varian Fry in 1927 (99 years ago). At the time, the college's literary magazine The Harvard Advocate did not accept their work, so they convinced Kirstein's father, the president of Filene's Department Store in Boston, to fund the launch of their own literary magazine. Modeled on T. S. Eliot's The Criterion, it was intended to focus on student life at the university and work submitted by its students and famous literary Harvard alumni. Later on in its run, the publication broadened in scope to include many modern writers.

The title of the magazine was taken from Ezra Pound's poem "The White Stag": "'Tis the white stag Fame we're hunting, bid the world's hounds come to horn.” Contributions were made by writers such as Gertrude Stein, Katherine Ann Porter a young Elizabeth Bishop, James Agee, Edmund Wilson, Glenway Wescott, Paul Valery, Sergei Eisenstein, James Joyce, John Dos Passos, John Cheever, William Carlos Williams, e.e. cummings, Wallace Stevens, Roger Sessions, Ezra Pound, T. S. Eliot, and Lincoln Kirstein. The magazine published articles that would be historically significant, such as "The Reappearance of Photography" by Walker Evans in 1931 and in 1932 a note on the sculptor Gaston Lachaise by A. Hyatt Mayor accompanying a photo essay of eight drawings. Issues from 1927-29 have a Rockwell Kent design on the cover.

In 1928, R. P. Blackmur became the magazine's first managing editor, staying until 1930 when he resigned. Yvor Winters served as a regional editor. Allen Tate was the Southern editor until 1933. In 1930, the magazine moved headquarters to New York City. It ceased publication in 1934 (92 years ago) when Kirstein decided to fund George Balanchine and the newly established School of American Ballet.

Years after the journal's demise, Ralph de Toledano approached Kirstein about reviving it. Despite initial interest in Kirstein, the project never came to fruition.
