= Claire Battershill =

Canadian writer and literary scholar

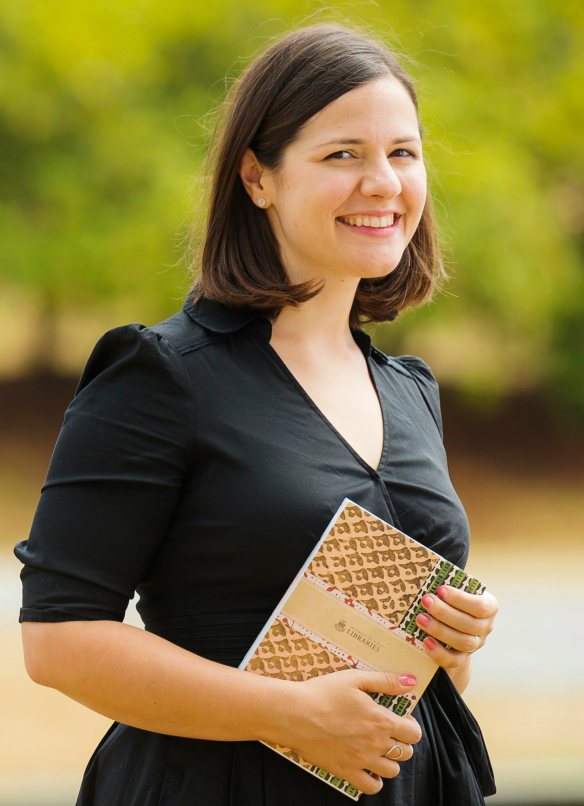
- Battershill at SFU in 2017
- Born: Dawson Creek, British Columbia
- Education: University of Oxford; University of Toronto
- Occupations: Writer and literary scholar
- Relatives: Andrew Battershill (brother)
- Writing career
- Period: 2010s–present
- Notable work: Circus (2014)
- Notable awards: CBC Literary Prize for Short Story; Social Sciences and Humanities Research Council Talent Award

Claire Battershill is a Canadian fiction writer and literary scholar. On September 15, 2017, Battershill was honoured by receiving a Social Sciences and Humanities Research Council Talent Award from Governor General David Johnston.

Her collection of short stories, Circus, was published by McClelland and Stewart in 2014, the title story having won the CBC Literary Prize in 2008. The book was awarded the Kobo Emerging Writer Prize, was a joint winner of the Canadian Authors Association Emerging Writer Award, and a finalist for the Danuta Gleed Award and the PEN International New Voices Award.

== Biography ==
Battershill was born in Dawson Creek, British Columbia, and is the sister of novelist Andrew Battershill.

She holds a BA (Hons) degree in English from the University of Oxford and a PhD in book history and English literature from the University of Toronto. She publishes academically on the literary history and culture of the 20th century, especially on Virginia Woolf and her publishing house, the Hogarth Press.

Battershill's collection of short stories, Circus, was published by McClelland and Stewart in 2014. The title story had won the CBC Literary Award for Short Fiction in 2008.The book won the Kobo Emerging Writer Prize, was a co-winner of the Canadian Authors Association Emerging Writer Award, and a finalist for the Danuta Gleed Award and the PEN International New Voices Award.

== Awards ==
- 2008: CBC Literary Prize for Short Story ("Circus")
- 2017: Social Sciences and Humanities Research Council's Talent Award
