= Alycia Pirmohamed =

Canadian poet

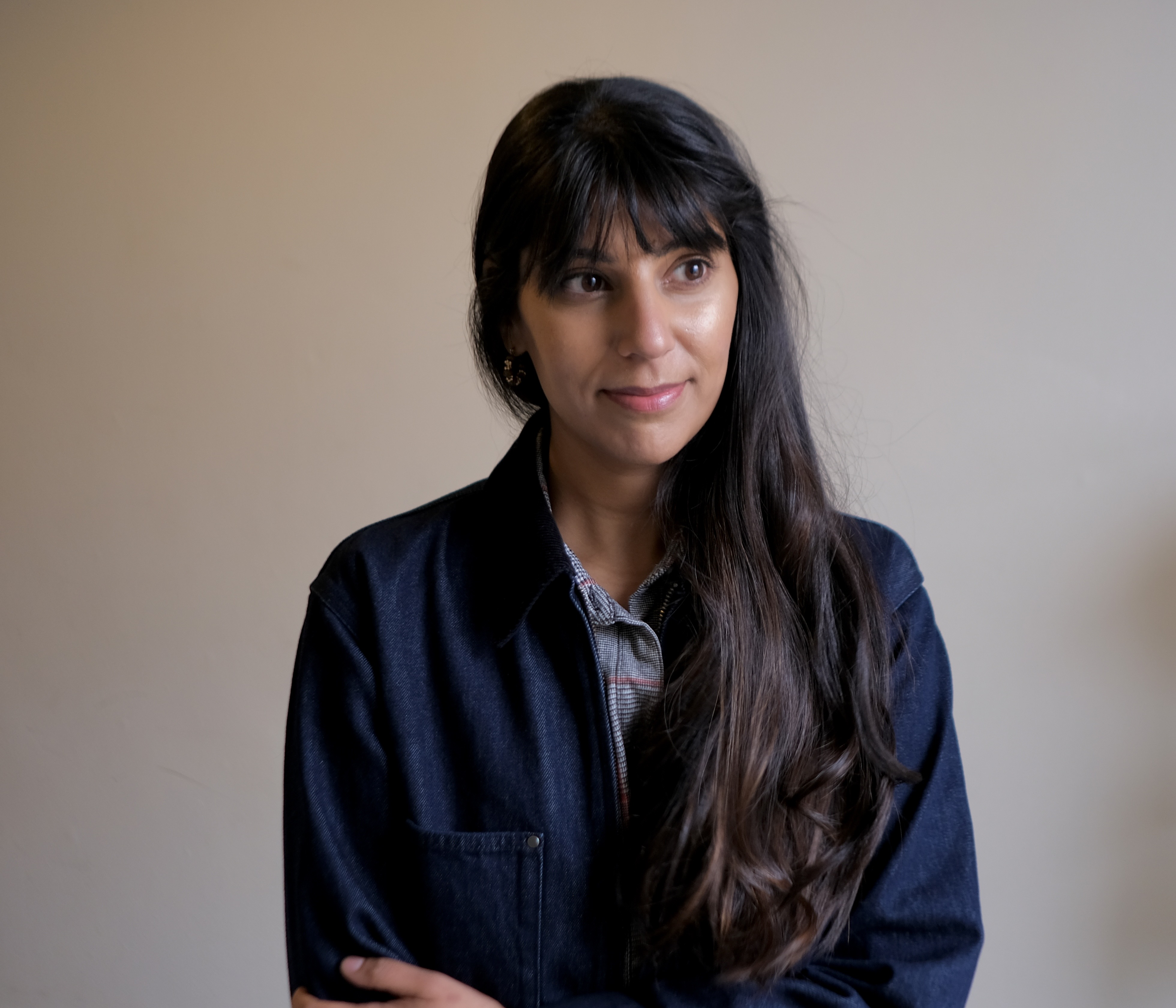
- Born: Edmonton, Alberta
- Education: University of Oregon; University of Edinburgh
- Occupation: Poet
- Writing career
- Notable works: Shorelines, Another Way To Split Water
- Notable awards: The CBC Literary Prize (2019), The Edwin Morgan Poetry Award (2020), The Nan Shepherd Prize (2023), Pushcart Prize
- Website: alycia-pirmohamed.com

Alycia Pirmohamed is a Canadian-born poet living in Scotland, who teaches Creative Writing at the University of Cambridge. She has published four poetry pamphlets, Faces that Fled the Wind, Hinge, Second Memory (co-authored with Pratyusha), and this too is a glistening (co-authored with Jessica J. Lee, Nina Mingya Powles, and Pratyusha). Pirmohamed has won multiple awards for her poetry, including the CBC Literary Prize for poetry in 2019, the Edwin Morgan Poetry Award in 2020, the Nan Shepherd Prize for nonfiction in 2023, and a Pushcart Prize.

== Biography ==
Alycia Pirmohamed was born and raised in Alberta, Canada. She obtained an MFA from the University of Oregon and later completed a PhD at the University of Edinburgh, where she studied the poetry of second generation immigrant writers. Faces that Fled the Wind, Pirmohamed's first poetry pamphlet, was published by BOAAT Press in 2019. The pamphlet was selected for the BOAAT Chapbook Prize in 2018. She was also the recipient of the Ploughshares Emerging Writers’ Contest in Poetry in 2018.

In 2019, Pirmohamed was awarded the CBC poetry prize, with her poem, Love Poem with Elk and Punctuation, Prairie Storm and Tasbih. She was awarded $6,000 (CAD) from the Canada Council for the Arts and a writing residency at the Banff Centre for Arts and Creativity. Pirmohamed won additional poetry prizes in 2019, including the 92Y Discovery Poetry prize, the Sawti Poetry Prize and the Gulf Coast poetry prize.

In 2020, Pirmohamed was named the winner of the Edwin Morgan Poetry Award for the best unpublished poetry collection by a Scottish poet under the age of 30. Her pamphlet, Hinge, was later published by Ignition Press in 2020. The £20,000 poetry prize is one of the largest in the UK. Pirmohamed's first full poetry collection, Another Way to Split Water, was published Sept 2, 2022.

In 2023, Pirmohamed received the Nan Shepherd Prize for a collection of essays called Shorelines, along with a contract with Canongate Books and an offer of literary representation from Caro Clarke at Portobello Literary. The essays are about the psychological aftermath of the 9/11 terrorist attacks for a young Muslim girl, and her shifting understanding of the vulnerability of her body as she moved through Midwestern Canada, the Pacific Northwest, East Africa, and the UK.

Pirmohamed is co-founder of the Scottish BPOC Writers Network (SBWN). The organization, founded in 2018 by Pirmohamed and Jay Gao, "is an advocacy and professional development group for writers who identify as BPOC (Black, Asian, minority ethnic), mixed-race or POC (people of colour) with a connection to Scotland."

== Selected publications ==
- Faces that Fled the Wind (BOAAT Press 2019), pamphlet
- Hinge (ignitionpress, 2020), pamphlet
- Second Memory, (Guillemot Press, 2021) pamphlet co-authored with Pratyusha
- this too is a glistening (Bitter Melon, 2024), pamphlet co-authored with Jessica J. Lee, Nina Mingya Powles, and Pratyusha
- Another Way to Split Water (Birlinn (publisher) 2022), poetry collection
- A Beautiful and Vital Place (Canongate Books, upcoming), nonfiction

== Awards and recognition ==
- The BOAAT Press Chapbook Prize (2018), Faces that Fled the Wind, pamphlet
- Ploughshares Emerging Writers’ Contest in Poetry (2018), Elegy for My Mother's Sister, Ways of Looking, Belief as an Ocean Landscape, and No Homeland Ghazal, poems
- 92Y Discovery Poetry winner (2019), There Are Parts of Myself I Have Watched Die, poem
- The CBC Literary Prize for poetry, (2019), Love Poem with Elk and Punctuation, Prairie Storm and Tasbih, poem
- The Sawti Poetry Prize (2019), Self-Portrait as a Lost Language, poem
- The Gulf Coast Prize in Poetry, (2019), Hinge, pamphlet
- The Edwin Morgan Poetry Prize (2020), Hinge, pamphlet
- The Poetry Book Society pamphlet Choice (2020), Hinge, pamphlet
- Raymond Souster Award (2023, shortlist), Another Way to Split Water
- Nan Shepherd Prize (2023), A Beautiful and Vital Place
