= Jeramy Dodds =

Canadian poet

- Born: 4 December 1974 (age 51); Ajax, Ontario, Canada
- Writing career
- Notable awards: Bronwen Wallace Memorial Award (2006), CBC Literary Award (2007), Trillium Book Award (2009)

Jeramy Dodds (born 4 December 1974 in Ajax, Ontario) is a Canadian poet.

Born in Ajax, Ontario, Dodds grew up in Orono, Ontario. He studied English literature and anthropology at Trent University, medieval Icelandic studies at The University of Iceland, and has worked as a research archaeologist in Canada. He was a poetry editor at Coach House Books until January 2018.

He received the 2006 Bronwen Wallace Memorial Award and won the 2007 CBC Literary Prize for Poetry. His debut poetry collection, Crabwise to the Hounds (Coach House Books, 2008), received the 2009 Trillium Book Award for Poetry, and was shortlisted for both the 2009 Gerald Lampert Award and the 2009 Griffin Poetry Prize.

== Bibliography ==
=== Books ===
- Dodds, Jeramy. (2017) Drakkar Noir. Toronto: Coach House Books. ISBN 9781552453551
- —— (2008). Crabwise to the Hounds. Toronto: Coach House Books. ISBN 9781552452059

=== Translations ===
- (Trans.). (2014). The Poetic Edda. Toronto: Coach House Books. ISBN 9781552452967
