= Wascana Review =

Canadian literary magazine

- Editor: Kathleen Wall
- Categories: Literary magazine
- Frequency: Biannual
- Publisher: University of Regina
- Founded: 1966
- Final issue: 2012
- Country: Canada
- Website: https://www.wascanareview.com
- ISSN: 0043-0412 (print); 1923-7588 (web)
- OCLC: 301747930

Wascana Review was a biannual literary magazine, established in 1966, published by the University of Regina. The magazine was published open access, beginning with vol. 42 (2007). Due to decreases in funding of the English Department at the University of Regina, it ceased publication in 2012.

The review focused on essays, articles, and poetry by contemporary authors. Its contributors included Di Brandt, Elizabeth Brewster, Sharon Butala, Lorna Crozier, Northrop Frye, Janette Turner Hospital, Linda Hutcheon, Mark Kingwell, Robert Kroetsch, Susan Musgrave, Al Purdy, Leon Rooke, Guy Vanderhaeghe, Tom Wayman, Susan McCaslin, Lance Woolaver, and George Woodcock. It contained video and sound files, as well as text.

Its former editors-in-chief have included Joan Givner; as of 2011, the general editor was Kathleen Wall.
