= SS Calabria =

Former steamship (1922–1940)

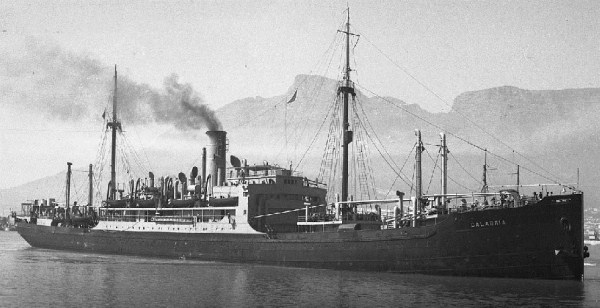

History

Germany, Italy, United Kingdom
- Name: Werra (1922–35); Calabria (1935–40); Empire Inventor (allocated but not applied)
- Namesake: River Werra, Germany; The Calabria region of Italy
- Owner: Norddeutscher Lloyd (1922–35); Flotte Riunite Cosulich-Lloyd-Sabaudo (1935–37); Lloyd Triestino (1937–40); Ministry of War Transport (1940)
- Operator: Norddeutscher Lloyd (1922–35); Flotte Riunite Cosulich-Lloyd-Sabaudo (1935–37); Lloyd Triestino (1937–40); British India SN Co (1940)
- Port of registry: (Weimar Republic) (Germany) Bremen, 1922–35; (Italy) Genoa 1935–37; (Italy) Trieste 1937–40; (United Kingdom) 1940
- Builder: AG Weser, Bremen
- Yard number: 324
- Completed: 1922
- Out of service: 8 December 1940
- Identification: code letters QLRH (until 1933); Call sign DODP (1934–35); call sign IBCF (1935–40)
- Fate: Torpedoed and sunk, 8 December 1940
- Notes: sister ships: Coblenz, Fulda, Saarbrücken, Trier, Weser

General characteristics
- Type: cargo and passenger liner
- Tonnage: 9,476 GRT; tonnage under deck 6,441; 5,397 NRT
- Length: 458.7 ft (139.8 m) p/p
- Beam: 57.6 ft (17.6 m)
- Depth: 30.8 ft (9.4 m)
- Decks: 8
- Installed power: 604 NHP
- Propulsion: 2 × triple-expansion steam engines; twin screw
- Speed: 12.5 knots (23.2 km/h)
- Crew: 129 officers and men, plus 1 DEMS gunner (1940)
- Sensors & processing systems: wireless direction finding; submarine signalling

SS Calabria was a passenger and cargo steamship. AG Weser built her for Norddeutscher Lloyd. She was launched as D/S Werra and completed in 1922. ("D/S" stands for Dampfschiff in German as "SS" stands for "steamship" in English.)

In 1935 she was bought by Flotte Riunite Cosulich-Lloyd-Sabaudo Navigazione Generale, who renamed her Calabria. In 1937 she was sold to Lloyd Triestino.

In June 1940 the UK seized her and placed in the management of the British-India Steam Navigation Company. In December 1940 she was torpedoed and sunk. When she sank, all of her 360 passengers and crew lost their lives. The Ministry of War Transport (MoWT) was going to rename her Empire Inventor, but she was sunk before this had been done.

== Building ==
The Allied Powers seized numerous NDL ships either during the First World War as prize ships or afterwards for war reparations. In the 1920s NDL replaced them with a new fleet from Bremer Vulkan, AG Vulcan Stettin and AG Weser. The first of the new ships were delivered in 1922; Werra among them.

== Katherine Anne Porter ==
In 1931, on a voyage from Veracruz, Mexico, to Bremerhaven, Germany, the ship carried one of her most famous passenger, the short story writer Katherine Anne Porter, and her husband Eugene Pressly. During the voyage she kept a diary, where a few years later she used the diary as a source inspiration for her only novel Ship of Fools (Porter novel) in 1962. Where it would become a 1965 Oscar winning film of the same name Ship of Fools (film) starring Vivien Leigh And Lee Marvin.

== Career ==
Werra was one of a series of six sister ship s that AG Weser built for NDL. Werra and Weser were completed in 1922; Coblenz, Saarbrücken and Trier in 1923 and Fulda in 1924.

Werra had two three-cylinder triple-expansion steam engines and twin screws. Between them her two engines were rated at 604 NHP. Werra was equipped with wireless direction finding and submarine signalling.

In 1935 NDL sold Werra, Coblenz and Saarbrücken to Flotte Riunite Cosulich-Lloyd-Sabaudo which renamed them Calabria, Sicilia and Toscana and registered them in Genoa. In 1937 the three ships were sold to Lloyd Triestino, which registered Calabria in Trieste.

On 10 June 1940 Italy declared war on France and the United Kingdom. At the time Calabria was in drydock in Calcutta in British India, so on 11 June the British authorities seized her. She was transferred to the MoWT, which appointed the British-India Steam Navigation Company to manage her. The MoWT planned to rename her Empire Inventor, but this intention was overtaken by events.

== Sinking ==
Approximate position of Calabria's wreck in the Western Approaches

In December 1940 Calabria was en route to the UK with a cargo of 4,000 tons of iron, 3,050 tons of tea and 1,870 tons of oilcake. Her Master, David Lonie, commanded 128 officers and crew plus one DEMS gunner. She was also carrying 230 mostly Indian supernumaries who were travelling to crew other ships. Calabria's crew and supernumaries included also four Hong Kong Chinese crewmen and one Danish merchant officer.

Calabria left Freetown in Sierra Leone with convoy SLS-56 headed to the UK but fell behind. On the evening of Sunday 8 December German Type IX submarine U-103, commanded by Viktor Schütze, torpedoed her in the Western Approaches about 295 nautical miles (546 km) west of Slyne Head in County Galway, Ireland. U-103 hit Calabria with one torpedo at 20:58 and a second at 21:06. All 360 hands and passengers were lost: there were no survivors.

Calabria's latitude was 52 degrees 26 minutes north, at that time of year the sun would have set just before 1600 hours local time, and the ship would have been blacked out under wartime regulations. However, the moon was waxing gibbous, had risen at 1315 hrs and did not set until 0218 hrs in the small hours of the next morning. If the sky was clear, Schütze would have been able to target Calabria by moonlight.

The oldest man aboard was Calabria's chief cook, Santan Martins, who was 79 years old. Martins may have been the oldest merchant seaman killed at sea in the Second World War.

== Monuments and relics ==
Those who died in Calabria's sinking are commemorated in the Second World War section of the Merchant Navy War Memorial at Tower Hill in London. Her Indian seamen and supernumaries are commemorated in the Commonwealth War Graves Commission monuments at Chittagong and Mumbai.

In 1940 after the British seized Calabria a small bronze ship's bell was removed from her. It was offered at auction in September 2012 and again in April 2013.
