= John Glenday =

Scottish poet

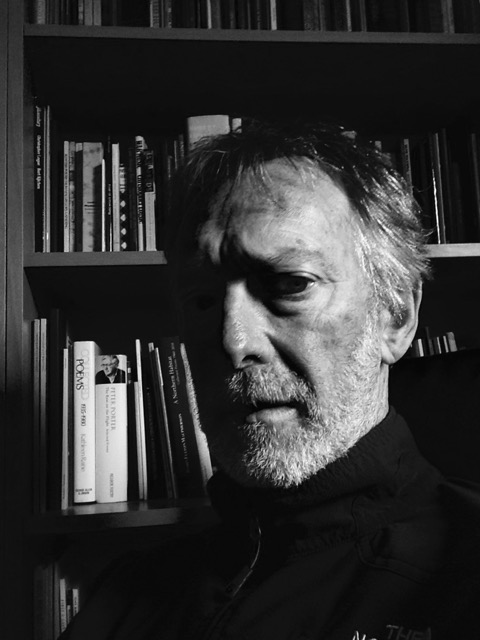
- Image of the Author
- Born: Broughty Ferry, Scotland
- Occupation: Poet
- Writing career
- Notable works: The Apple Ghost (1989); Undark (1995); Grain (2009); The Golden Mean (2015); Selected Poems (2020) mira (2020); The Firth (2020)

John Glenday grew up in Monifieth.

== Life ==
John lives in Angus, with his wife Erika.

His work appeared in Times Literary Supplement, London Review of Books, Poetry (Chicago), The Scotsman, The Guardian, Financial Times, Wascana Review, Ploughshares, Candlestick Press and Magma to name but a few.

John was shortlisted for the Ted Hughes Prize for Excellence in New Poetry and for the Griffin Poetry Prize 2010 for his collection Grain.

His work is included in many anthologies such as the Faber Book of Twentieth Century Scottish Poetry (Faber and Faber 1992), Last Words: New Poetry for the New Century (Picador, 1999), New British Poetry (Grey Wolf Press, 2004), Contemporary poetry and contemporary science (Oxford University Press, 2006), 100 Favourite Scottish Poems (Luath Press, 2006), 100 Favourite Scottish Love Poems (Luath Press, 2008), Being Human (Bloodaxe, 2011), Forward Book of Poetry 2016 (Faber & Faber, 2015) and Off the Shelf (Picador Poetry, 2018).

John was a judge for the National Poetry Competition in 2011, the Michael Marks Awards for Poetry Pamphlets 2022 and the Saltire Society Literary Awards 2022.

The Golden Mean won the 2015 Roehampton Poetry Prize. It was also shortlisted for the Saltire Society Poetry Prize.

The American photographer Sally Mann used an excerpt from John's poem Landscape with Flying Man for the title of her 2018 International Exhibition A Thousand Crossings.

John's Selected Poems was published by Picador Poetry in October 2020. The same year, he published 2 pamphlets: mira with Maria Isakova Bennett (Coast to Coast to Coast) and The Firth, published by Mariscat Press.

The Fife Arms Hotel in Braemar invited a Poetry commission to celebrate the Coronation of King Charles III in May 2023.

John is a poetry tutor and mentor and can be heard in the Poetry Archive..

John Glenday bio.

North Sea Poets - for online Poetry Workshops, Masterclasses and Webinars.

== Awards ==
- Scottish Arts Council Book Prize for The Apple Ghost
- Poetry Book Society Recommendation for Undark
- Poetry Book Society Recommendation for Grain
- Shortlisted for the Ted Hughes Award 2010 for Grain.
- Shortlisted for The Griffin Poetry Prize 2010 for Grain
- Winner of the 2015 Roehampton Poetry Prize 2015 for The Golden Mean.
- Shortlisted for the Saltire Society Poetry Prize for The Golden Mean.

== Poetry collections ==
- The Apple Ghost. Peterloo Poets. 1989. ISBN 978-1-871471-05-2.
- Undark. Peterloo Poets. 1995. ISBN 978-1-871471-60-1.
- Grain. Picador Poetry. 2009. ISBN 978-0-330-46134-4.
- The Golden Mean. Picador Poetry. 2015. ISBN 978-1447253914.
- mira. Coast to Coast to Coast. 2020.
- Selected Poems. Picador Poetry. 2020. ISBN 978-1529037722.
- The Firth. Mariscat Press. 2020. ISBN 978-1-9160609-6-8.
