= Roger Greenwald =

American poet

- Born: New Jersey
- Known for: Poet, editor, and translator from Scandinavian languages Norwegian poetry

Roger Greenwald is an American poet, translator, and editor based in Toronto, Ontario, Canada.

== Biography ==
Roger Greenwald was born in New Jersey, where his father, a physicist, worked at the Fort Monmouth Signal Labs. He grew up in New York City (the Bronx) and graduated from the Bronx High School of Science. In 1966 he received his BA from The City College of New York, where together with Richard Strier he edited four issues of the college literary magazine, Promethean, and participated in the weekly Promethean Writers Workshop, which included, among others, Peter Anson, Robert David Cohen, Samuel R. Delany, Joel Sloman, Elaine Schwager, and Lewis Warsh. Greenwald then spent one year doing graduate work at New York University and attending the Poetry Project Workshop at St. Mark's Church In-the-Bowery, led by the poet Joel Oppenheimer (assisted by Joel Sloman). Participants there included Sam Abrams, Scott Cohen, Michael G. Stephens, and Tom Weatherly. After moving to Toronto, Greenwald earned his MA (1969) and his PhD (1978) in English from the University of Toronto. He taught creative writing, translation, and composition at Innis College, part of the University of Toronto, until 2006.

In 1970 Greenwald founded the international literary annual WRIT Magazine, which he edited until it ceased publication in 1995. From 1982 onward, the Canadian poet Richard M. Lush served as associate editor. The magazine was supported by Innis College and the Ontario Arts Council. Special issues of WRIT included two devoted entirely to translations; starting with Number 19, each issue featured one translated writer. Greenwald was the regional editor for Denmark and Norway (and, with Rika Lesser, for Sápmi) for the 2008 anthology New European Poets.

Greenwald began writing poetry at the age of eight and was first published when he was in high school. His first notable publication was a poem that appeared in The World in 1968. In Canada his poetry won the Norma Epstein National Writing Competition in 1977. He published his first book of poems, Connecting Flight, in 1993. The next year he was the winner in the poetry category of the CBC Radio / Saturday Night Literary Awards. His poetry has appeared in many journals, including Panjandrum, Poetry East, The Spirit That Moves Us, Pequod, Prism International, Leviathan Quarterly, ARS-INTERPRES, Pleiades, Copper Nickel, Exile Magazine, The Manhattan Review, and Stand Magazine. He won First Prize for Travel Literature in the 2002 CBC Literary Awards competition. In 2018 he won the Gwendolyn MacEwen Poetry Award, a national award in Canada, and in 2024 his poem "Vacuum" won the Littoral Press Poetry Prize. His subsequent books of poems are Slow Mountain Train (2015), The Half-Life (2020), and An Opening in the Vertical World.

Greenwald is well known as a translator of Scandinavian literature, especially poetry. He has published three volumes of work by the Norwegian poet Rolf Jacobsen (1907–1994), most recently North in the World: Selected Poems of Rolf Jacobsen, (2002) which won the Lewis Galantière Award from the American Translators Association. His other major translation from Norwegian is Through Naked Branches: Selected Poems of Tarjei Vesaas, which was shortlisted for the 2001 PEN Award for Poetry in Translation. A revised edition was published in 2018. Further translations of poetry include three books by the Norwegian Poet Paal-Helge Haugen; Picture World, by the Danish poet Niels Frank; and from Swedish, The Time in Malmö on the Earth, by Jacques Werup and Guarding the Air: Selected Poems of Gunnar Harding. Greenwald has also translated two works of fiction from Swedish, the novel A Story about Mr. Silberstein, by the actor and writer Erland Josephson, and I Miss You, I Miss You!, a young-adult novel by Peter Pohl and Kinna Gieth. He has received numerous awards for his translations, including the American Scandinavian Foundation Translation Prize (twice), the Inger Sjöberg Translation Prize, the F. R. Scott Translation Prize, the Richard Wilbur Prize, and the Harold Morton Landon Translation Award.

== Bibliography ==
=== Poetry ===
- Connecting flight. Toronto: Williams-Wallace, 1993. ISBN 0-88795-099-X.
- Slow mountain train. Rochester, NY: Tiger Bark Press, 2015. ISBN 978-0-9860445-6-4.
- The half-life. Rochester, NY: Tiger Bark Press, 2020. ISBN 978-1-7329012-5-4.
- An opening in the vertical world. Boston: Black Widow Press, 2024. ISBN 979-8-9911391-0-6.

=== Translations ===
- The silence afterwards: Selected poems of Rolf Jacobsen. Princeton: Princeton University Press, 1985. ISBN 0-691-06647-7, ISBN 0-691-01424-8. Foreword by Poul Borum; Introduction by Greenwald. Parallel Norwegian and English text.
- Stone fences. Columbia: University of Missouri Press, 1986. ISBN 0-8262-0601-8. (With William Mishler.) Translation of Steingjerde, by Paal-Helge Haugen. Introduction by Greenwald. Parallel Norwegian and English text.
- The time in Malmö on the earth. Toronto: Exile Editions, 1989. ISBN 0-920428-50-9. Translation of Tiden i Malmö, på jorden, by Jacques Werup. Introduction by Greenwald. English only.
- A story about Mr. Silberstein. Evanston: Northwestern University Press / Hydra Books, 1995, paperback 2001. ISBN 0-8101-1277-9, ISBN 0-8101-1910-2. Translation of En berättelse om herr Silberstein, by Erland Josephson.
- Wintering with the Light. Los Angeles: Sun & Moon Press, 1997. ISBN 1-55713-273-9. Translation of Det overvintra lyset, by Paal-Helge Haugen. Parallel Norwegian and English text.
- Did I know you? Oslo: Gyldendal Norsk Forlag, 1997. ISBN 82-05-24866-4. Translation of 31 poems by Rolf Jacobsen. Parallel Norwegian and English text.
- I miss you, I miss you! New York: R&S Books / Farrar, Straus & Giroux, 1999. ISBN 978-91-29-63935-3. Translation of Jag saknar dig, jag saknar dig! by Peter Pohl and Kinna Gieth.
- Through naked branches: Selected poems of Tarjei Vesaas. Princeton: Princeton University Press, 2000. ISBN 978-0-691-00896-7, ISBN 978-0-691-00897-4. Introduction by Greenwald. Parallel Norwegian and English text.
- North in the world: Selected poems of Rolf Jacobsen. Chicago: University of Chicago Press, 2002. ISBN 978-0-226-39035-2. Introduction by Greenwald. Parallel Norwegian and English text.
- Picture world. Toronto: BookThug, 2011. ISBN 9781897388853. Translation of Én vej, by Niels Frank. English only.
- Meditations on Georges de La Tour. Toronto: BookThug, 2013. ISBN 9781927040638. Translation of Meditasjonar over Georges de La Tour, by Paal-Helge Haugen. Introduction by Greenwald. Parallel Norwegian and English text.
- Guarding the air: Selected poems of Gunnar Harding. Boston: Black Widow Press, 2014. ISBN 978-0-9856122-7-6. Introduction by Greenwald. English only.
- Through naked branches: Selected poems of Tarjei Vesaas, revised bilingual edition. Boston: Black Widow Press, 2018. ISBN 978-0-9995803-4-9. Introduction by Greenwald. Parallel Norwegian and English text.
