= Ship of Fools (Porter novel) =

1962 novel by Katherine Anne Porter

- Author: Katherine Anne Porter
- Language: English
- Publisher: Little, Brown
- Publication date: 1962
- Publication place: United States
- Media type: Print (hardback & paperback)
- Pages: 497

Ship of Fools is a 1962 novel by Katherine Anne Porter, telling the tale of a group of disparate characters sailing from Mexico to Europe aboard a German passenger ship. The large cast of characters includes Germans, Mexicans, Americans, Spaniards, a group of Cuban medical students, a Swiss family, and a Swede. In steerage is a large group of Spanish workers being returned to Spain from Cuba. It is an allegory tracing the rise of Nazism and looks metaphorically at the progress of the world on its "voyage to eternity".

== Background ==
Porter had been widely praised for her short stories, mostly written between 1922 and 1940. She began work on the novel in 1940, intending it initially to be a novella (or "short novel", as Porter would put it, as she famously wrote about how she detested the word "novella"). The story was based on a journal she kept in 1931 during a sea voyage from Veracruz, Mexico, on her way to study in Bremerhaven, Germany, on the German Passenger Ship SS Calabria (1922) (at the time named SS Werra), a Guggenheim Fellowship, and the characters in the novel were based on real people she met during the trip. The title was taken from Das Narrenschiff ("The Fool-Ship"), a 15th-century German poem by Sebastian Brant.

For many years, the initial publisher Harcourt Brace would announce the forthcoming novel, but she remained unable to complete it for 22 years. As a result, it became eagerly expected by the literary world. In response to critics who complained about the long wait, Porter said, "Look here, this is my life and my work and you keep out of it. When I have a book I will be glad to have it published."

Ship of Fools first appeared in the Autumn 1959 edition of Texas Quarterly journal (54 pgs).

== Reception ==
Ship of Fools outsold every other American novel published in 1962. It was a Book of the Month Club selection and immediately, the film rights were sold for $500,000 ($5,321,782 adjusted for inflation).

Critical reception was mixed. While Mark Schorer of The New York Times and Glenway Wescott in The Atlantic Monthly were effusive in their praise, Stanley Kauffmann of The New Republic and Granville Hicks in the Saturday Review were disappointed. Porter herself was never satisfied with the novel, calling it "unwieldy" and "enormous".

The critic Elizabeth Hardwick had this to say about Ship of Fools: "All is too static and the implied parable is never quite achieved. There is something a little musty, like old yellowing notes. The flawless execution of the single scenes impresses and yet the novel remains too snug and shipshape for the waters of history."

== Theme ==
The theme of the novel is the passengers' unavailing withdrawal from a life of disappointment, seeking a kind of utopia, and, "without knowing what to do next", setting out for a long voyage to pre–World War II Europe, a world of prejudice, racism and evil. Mrs. Treadwell, a nostalgic American divorcee, hopes to find happiness in Paris, where she once spent her youth. Elsa Lutz, the plain daughter of a Swiss hotelkeeper, thinks heaven might be in the Isle of Wight. Jenny, an artist, says the most dangerous and happiest moment in her life was when she was swimming alone in the Gulf of Mexico, confronted with a school of dolphins. And at the end of the novel, one of the ship's musicians, a gangly starving boy, feels overjoyed to finally be off the ship and back in his home country, as if Germany were a "human being, a good and dear trusted friend who had come a long way to welcome him". Thus Porter manages to convey that salvation is reality, and evil can be overcome.

== Film adaptation ==
The 1965 film was adapted by Abby Mann from the novel and was directed by Stanley Kramer. It won Academy Awards for Best Art Direction-Set Decoration, Black-and-White (Robert Clatworthy, Joseph Kish) and Best Cinematography, Black-and-White. Porter's first reaction to the film adaptation was that Mann had omitted too much from the book, distorting its message. It was also noteworthy for being the last film to feature the actress Vivien Leigh.

== In popular culture ==
- In "Six Month Leave," the ninth episode of the second season of Mad Men (2008), Betty Draper is shown reading the novel while alone at home, listening to radio coverage of Marilyn Monroe's death.

== See also ==
- Ship of Fools allegory
