= Noon Wine =

1937 novel by American Katherine Anne Porter

- First edition
- Author: Katherine Anne Porter
- Language: English
- Publication date: 1937

Noon Wine is a 1937 short novel by American author Katherine Anne Porter. It initially appeared in a limited numbered edition of 250, all signed by the author and published by Shuman's. It later appeared in 1939 as part of Pale Horse, Pale Rider (ISBN 0-15-170755-3), a collection of three short novels by the author, including the title story and "Old Mortality." A dark tragedy about a farmer's futile act of homicide that leads to his own suicide, the story takes place on a small dairy farm in southern Texas during the 1890s. It has been filmed twice for television, in 1966 and 1985.

While Noon Wine and its companion pieces, "Old Mortality" and "Pale Horse, Pale Rider," have been described as novellas, Porter referred to them as short novels. Porter, in the preface "Go Little Book . . " to The Collected Stories of Katherine Anne Porter, abjured the word "novella," calling it a "slack, boneless, affected word that we do not need to describe anything." She went on to say, "Please call my works by their right names. We have four that cover every division: short stories, long stories, short novels, novels."

== Plot summary ==
Royal Earle Thompson owns a dairy farm in southern Texas during the late 1890s. His farm is fairly unproductive, due in part to Thompson's laziness and distaste for manual labor. Thompson lives with his wife, Ellie, and two small sons, Arthur and Herbert. Ellie is chronically ill, though she does her best to perform her domestic duties.

Olaf Helton presents himself at the farm. The taciturn Swede asks Thompson for a job. Thompson offers Helton a small monthly wage, plus room and board. Thompson views Helton as somewhat beneath him because he is a foreigner. Even though the wage is far below what Helton reports having earned in the wheat fields of North Dakota, he proves himself to be an efficient farmhand, transforming Thompson's run-down dairy farm into a profitable enterprise.

Thompson grows to appreciate his mysterious, silent farmhand. He increases his pay and entrusts him with much responsibility. Ellie also values the difference Helton has made to the farm. She is troubled by him just once, when she sees Helton silently shake her two boys in a terrifying manner after they had snatched his harmonica. She asks her husband to tell Helton that in the future he is to leave the discipline of the boys to their parents. The family quickly moves past the event.

Nine years go by, and Helton's incomparable work ethic continues the farm's prosperity. The Thompsons come to view Helton as one of the family; his traits of rarely speaking, never smiling, and continually playing the same song on his precious harmonica are oddities that they simply accept.

An offensive and irritating stranger named Homer T. Hatch shows up at the farm. Like Helton, he has come to Texas from North Dakota, and says he is there to find Helton. Hatch annoys Thompson immediately with his grating banter and subtle insults. Hatch eventually reveals that he is a bounty hunter, and Helton is an escaped mental patient who must be returned to the asylum. Helton had killed his only brother with a pitchfork after he lost one of Helton's harmonicas and refused to replace it. Thompson is stunned by this news and unwilling to give up Helton, instinctively sensing that Hatch is an evil man.

Thompson has a vision of Hatch driving a knife blade into Helton's stomach. The farmer rushes to Helton's defense, striking Hatch with an axe blade and killing him. Ellie comes on the scene only in time to see Hatch lying on the ground and Helton running away. The fleeing Helton, in the midst of an apparent "mad" episode, is killed by the sheriff's men. When found, Helton's body bears no mark of a knife; it appears that Hatch's attack on Helton was merely Thompson's hallucination. Thompson impresses on Ellie the importance of her swearing that she witnessed Hatch attacking Helton, and she reluctantly agrees.

After a perfunctory trial, Thompson is acquitted on the ground of self-defense/defense of another. Thompson continues to relive the killing, sometime wondering if he could have sent Hatch away, other times certain that he had no choice. Worse, he is sure that the community regards him as not innocent, and fears that he has become an outcast. He decides to pay a visit on every household of the small farming community, accompanied by the unwilling Ellie, in an attempt to regain his reputation. His efforts are unsuccessful; both he and Ellie can see that they have lost the esteem of their neighbors and former friends.

Thompson realizes that even his wife is afraid of him and that their now nearly grown sons no longer trust him with her. He decides that he must end his ruined life. Dressed in his best, he walks as far as he can while still on his land. He writes a note, saying that he never intended to harm Hatch, even though Hatch deserved to die, and is sorry that he had to kill him. Thompson puts no blame on Helton, observing that had Hatch come hunting him instead of Helton, his friend would have done the same for him. Thompson then shoots himself with his shotgun.

== Major characters in Noon Wine ==
- Royal Earle Thompson
- Ellie Thompson
- Arthur Thompson
- Herbert Thompson
- Olaf Eric Helton
- Homer T. Hatch

== Major themes ==
Literary scholars view the tragic events in Noon Wine as an allusion to the Greek structure of dramatic tragedy, in which a hero suffers a terrible fate caused by his/her own self. Critics also view the character of Homer T. Hatch as Thompson's doppelganger, interpreting the conflict between them as a psychological battle between warring aspects of Thompson's personality. Hatch seems to reflect darker aspects of Thompson's mind, distorting and accentuating them in a manner that is unbearable to Thompson.

== Radio and television adaptations ==
=== Radio (1948) ===
An hour long adaptation was produced as one of the first episodes of the 1948 radio series NBC University Theatre. The drama starred Beulah Bondi and John Beal as the Thompsons and was instrumental in the series winning a Peabody Award that year.

=== Television (1966) ===
Sam Peckinpah directed the original adaptation for ABC, and the project became an hour-long presentation for ABC Stage 67, premiering on Nov. 23, 1966. The film featured Jason Robards, Olivia de Havilland, Theodore Bikel and Per Oscarsson, along with Pecknpah regulars Ben Johnson and L. Q. Jones.

At the time, Peckinpah was a Hollywood outcast following the troubled production Major Dundee (1965) and his firing from the set of The Cincinnati Kid (1965). He caught a lucky break when producer Daniel Melnick needed a writer and director to adapt Porter's short novel for television. Melnick was a big fan of Peckinpah's television series The Westerner and his 1962 film Ride the High Country, and had heard the director had been unfairly fired from The Cincinnati Kid. Against the objections of many within the industry, Melnick hired Peckinpah and gave him free rein. Peckinpah completed the script, which Miss Porter enthusiastically endorsed.

The television film was a critical hit, with Peckinpah nominated by the Writers Guild for Best Television Adaptation and the Directors Guild of America for Best Television Direction. Robards would keep a personal copy of the film in his private collection for years as he considered the project to be one of his most satisfying professional experiences. A rare film, which, for almost half a century, could only be viewed at the Library of Congress and the Museum of Broadcasting, Noon Wine finally reached home viewers in the summer of 2014 via limited Blu-ray release on the Twilight Time label.

Peckinpah's adaptation of Noon Wine is today considered one of the director's most intimate works, revealing his dramatic potential and artistic depth. The film's unexpected success laid the groundwork for his professional comeback. Following one additional television assignment, one feature film script sold (for Buzz Kulik's Villa Rides), and a brief teaching engagement at UCLA, Peckinpah was eventually hired by Warner Bros.-Seven Arts, shortly thereafter directing his breakthrough film The Wild Bunch (1969). Peckinpah would again work with Daniel Melnick on the 1971 film Straw Dogs.

=== Television (1985) ===
The novel was adapted again in 1985 as a television film for American Playhouse on PBS. The film starred Fred Ward, Stellan Skarsgård, Pat Hingle, Lise Hilboldt, Jon Cryer and Roberts Blossom. It was written and directed by Michael Fields, James Ivory served as executive producer. The film was released on video in 1998.
