= Penny Boxall =

Scottish poet

- Born: 1987 (age 38–39)
- Education: University of East Anglia (BA, MA 2009)
- Occupation: Poet
- Writing career
- Notable work: Ship of the Line
- Notable awards: Edwin Morgan Poetry Award (2016)
- Website: pennyboxall.wordpress.com

Penny Boxall (born 1987) is a Scottish poet. Her first poetry collection, Ship of the Line, won the Edwin Morgan Poetry Award in 2016.

== Biography ==
Boxall was born in 1987. She grew up in Aberdeenshire, Scotland and Yorkshire, England. Boxall graduated from the University of East Anglia with a BA in English Literature and an MA in Creative Writing (Poetry). After graduation, Boxall worked in several museums: the Wordsworth Trust, the Ashmolean Museum, the Royal Collection, and The Laurence Stern Trust at Shandy Hall. Boxall was a writer-in-residence at Gladstone’s Library in Wales, Hawthornden Castle in Scotland, Château de Lavigny in Switzerland and Cove Park in Scotland. She has taught poetry at Oxford Brookes University.

Boxall's first poetry collection, Ship of the Line, was published by (Eyewear, 2014) and reissued in a new edition in 2018 by Valley Press. Her second poetry collection, Who Goes There?, was published by Valley Press in 2018. Her poem, The Wedding List, won the Mslexia/PBS Women's Poetry Competition 2018. Boxall collaborated with woodblock artist Naoko Matsubara, in In Praise of Hands: Woodcuts by Naoko Matsubara - Poems by Penny Boxall, published by the Ashmolean Museum in 2021. Her latest poetry collection, 'Lights Out' won a New Writing North Award and a grant from the Authors' Foundation.

Boxall lives in York where she holds a Royal Literary Fund Fellowship at the University of York. She is currently working on her next poetry collection.

== Selected publications ==
- Ship of the Line, (Eyewear, 2014), reissued by (Valley Press, 2018)
- Who Goes There?, (Valley Press, 2018),
- 'In Praise of Hands: Woodcuts by Naoko Matsubara - Poems by Penny Boxall (Ashmolean Museum Publications, 2020)

== Awards and recognition ==
- Edwin Morgan Poetry Prize, Ship of the Line, (2016)
- The Elmet Trust Poetry Prize, (2016)
- The Mslexia/PBS Women's Poetry Competition, A Wedding List, (2018)
- Northern Writers' Award, Poetry, (2019)
