= Joan Givner =

British essayist, biographer, and novelist

Joan Givner (born in Manchester, England) is an essayist, biographer, and novelist, known for her biographies of women, short stories, and the Ellen Fremendon series of novels for younger readers that was finalist for the Silver Birch Awards, the 2006 Hackmatack Children's Choice Book Award for Ellen Fremedon, and the Diamond Willow Awards.

== Biography ==
Givner obtained a BA (Hons.) from the University of London (1958), and an MA from Washington University in St. Louis (1963), and after a period of teaching in the US, her Ph.D. in London in 1972. She joined the English Department of the University of Saskatchewan, Regina Campus, which in 1974 became the autonomous University of Regina, and where she was appointed Professor of English in 1981. She remained on the faculty until she retired in 1995 to settle in British Columbia and take up full-time writing.

In 1978-1979 Givner was Fellow of the Bunting Institute, Radcliffe College, Harvard University. Givner was editor of the Wascana Review the literary journal of the University of Regina from 1984 to 1992, is a jury member for several literary prizes, and a contributor to the Literary Review of Canada. In 1989 and 1990 she was a Member of the Social Sciences & Humanities Research Council adjudication committee, and in 1991, Chair of the Social Sciences and Humanities Research Council adjudication committee. In 1992 Givner won the CBC fiction competition.

In 1963 she married David Givner and has two children.

== Television ==
Katherine Anne Porter: The Eye of Memory (USA 1986) directed by Ken Harrison, produced by KERA Dallas, and starring Dina Chandel, Eleanor Clark, and Joan Givner as herself.

== Publications (selection) ==
- Katherine Anne Porter: A Life (1982), Simon and Schuster, ISBN 0-671-43207-9 (1982), commissioned by Katherine Anne Porter,; (revised 1991), University of Georgia Press, ISBN 978-0-8203-1340-5
- Tentacles of Unreason (1985), collection of short fiction
- Katherine Anne Porter: Conversations (1987), collection of interviews with writer Katherine Anne Porter, University Press of Mississippi, ISBN 978-0-87805-266-0
- Mazo De La Roche: The Hidden Life (1989), study of the life and work of writer Mazo De La Roche
- Unfortunate Incidents (1988, 2000), biography of Rachel de la Warr, Oberon Press, ISBN 978-0-88750-732-8
- Scenes from Provincial Life (1991), Oberon Press, ISBN 978-0-88750-858-5
- The Self-Portrait of a Literary Biographer (1993), autobiography, University of Georgia Press, ISBN 978-0-8203-1552-2
- In the Garden of Henry James (1996), short fiction, Oberon Press, ISBN 9780778010562
- Thirty-Four Ways of Looking at Jane Eyre (1998), short stories and essays, New Star Books, ISBN 978-0-921586-67-8
- Half Known Lives (2001), novel, New Star Books, ISBN 978-0-921586-78-4
- Playing Sarah Bernhardt (2004), novel, Dundurn Press, ISBN 978-1-55002-537-8
- Ellen Fremedon (2004), children's novel, Groundwood Books, ISBN 978-0-88899-557-5
- Ellen Fremedon: Journalist (2005), children's novel, Groundwood Books, ISBN 978-0-88899-640-4
- Ellen Fremedon, Volunteer (2007), children's novel, Groundwood Books, ISBN 978-0-88899-743-2
- Ellen's Book of Life (2010), children's novel, Groundwood Books, ISBN 978-0-88899-860-6
- A Girl Called Tennyson (2011), young adult fantasy novel, Thistledown Press, ISBN 978-1-897235-83-6
- The Hills Are Shadows (2014), sequel to A Girl Called Tennyson, Thistledown Press, ISBN 978-1-927068-91-5

== Plays ==
- Mazo and Caroline (1992)
