= Pale Horse, Pale Rider: Three Short Novels =

1939 collection by Katherine Anne Porter

- First edition cover art
- Author: Katherine Anne Porter
- Language: English
- Publisher: Harcourt, Brace & Company
- Publication date: 1939
- Media type: Print (hardcover)
- Pages: 285
- ISBN: 0-15-170755-3
- OCLC: 16675266
- Dewey Decimal: 813/.52
- LC Class: PS3531.O752

Pale Horse, Pale Rider: Three Short Novels is a volume of three short novels by American author Katherine Anne Porter published by Harcourt, Brace & Company in 1939. The collected novels are "Old Mortality," "Noon Wine" and the eponymous "Pale Horse, Pale Rider."

The collection was awarded the first annual gold medal for literature by the Society of Libraries of New York University in 1966.

== Stories ==
The short novels were published originally in literary journals, the date and magazine are provided below.

"Old Mortality" (The Southern Review, Spring 1937)
"Noon Wine" (Signatures, Spring 1936)
"Pale Horse, Pale Rider" (The Southern Review, Winter 1938)

== Description ==
Although the three short novels in this collection have been described as novellas, Porter referred to them as short novels. Porter, in the preface "Go Little Book . . " to The Collected Stories of Katherine Anne Porter, abjured the word "novella," calling it a "slack, boneless, affected word that we do not need to describe anything." She went on to say "Please call my works by their right names: we have four that cover every division: short stories, long stories, short novels, novels."

== Reception ==
"The work of so important a writer as Miss Porter must be judged by the lowest as well as the highest standards - and curiously enough, it is by the lowest standards that she fails. She is grave, she is delicate, she is just - but she lacks altogether the vulgar appeal. I cannot imagine she would ever make me cry, or laugh aloud. No doubt she would reply that she doesn't want to. But she should want to. I wish she would give herself a little more freely to the reader. I wish she would paint with broader, bolder strokes. I wish she wouldn't be so cautious." - Christopher Isherwood on Pale Horse, Pale Rider in The New Republic, April 19, 1939

Novelist Wallace Stegner praised "the absoluteness of technique and a felicity of language" that distinguished the stories in the collection:

"Pale Horse, Pale Rider", set in the influenza pandemic of 1918, and "Old Mortality", the indirectly told tragedy of a Southern belle, are as keen and polished as slim steel. Still, "Noon Wine" seems to me the best of the three, though not as perfectly proportioned…That story communicates; it has voltage. The other two, for all their perfection, seem to me to move away from the qualities that made Flowering Judas so exciting a book.

Time noted: "Pale Horse, Pale Rider is a collection of three short novels which belong with the best of contemporary U. S. writing in this difficult [literary] form. A distinctive book, it has the subtlety that has marked all of Miss Porter's writings, but not of the preciousness that had previously marred it."

Lewis Gannett in the New York Herald Tribune wrote: "Miss Porter writes little, and the subtlety of her art conceals its real strength: but she remains, after more than a decade in which she has baffled critics, one the great contemporary American writers."

Biographer Darleen Harbour Unrue observed that Porter's short fiction received greater critical approval when they appeared in collections "that revealed their thematic integration."

== "Pale Horse, Pale Rider" ==
The title story "Pale Horse, Pale Rider" is about the relationship between a newspaper woman, Miranda, and a soldier, Adam, during the influenza epidemic of 1918. In the course of the narrative, Miranda becomes sick and delirious, but recovers, only to find that Adam has died of the disease, which he likely caught while tending to her. The story is set in Denver, Colorado. Porter herself lived for a time in Denver, where she wrote reviews for the Rocky Mountain News and was stricken with influenza. The historian Alfred W. Crosby considered Pale Horse, Pale Rider to be such an exceptional depiction of the suffering caused by the influenza that he dedicated his book about the 1918 epidemic to Porter. The author Robert Penn Warren said "Pale Horse, Pale Rider" was "at the top level, you know, in that collection of the world's short novels."

The title comes from an African-American spiritual that the story references, which begins "Pale horse, pale rider, done took my lover away." The spiritual in turn is Biblical, coming from Revelation 6:1-8. There, the Four Horsemen of the Apocalypse are the Conqueror on a white horse, War on a red horse, Famine on a black horse, and Death on a pale horse. Porter herself said that the title story was about the pale rider, Death, who takes away an entire era, as illustrated in the ironic last line: "Now there would be time for everything."

== Sources ==
- Bloom, Harold. 2001. Katherine Anne Porter: Comprehensive Research and Study Guide. Chelsea House Publishers, Broomall, PA. ISBN 0-7910-5941-3
- Porter, Katherine Anne. 2009. Katherine Anne Porter: Collected Stories and Other Writings. Literary Classics of the United States, New York. The Library of America Series (2009). ISBN 978-1-59853-029-2
- Schwartz, Edward. 1953. Katherine Anne Porter: A Critical Bibliography. The Folcroft Press, Inc., Forcroft, PA. Reprinted from the Bulletin of the New York Public Library, May 1953. ISBN 9780841475823
- Stegner, Wallace. 1939. Pale Horse, Pale Rider: Three Short Novels, Virginia Quarterly Review (summer 1939) in Critical Essays on Katherine Anne Porter (1997). Darlene Harbour Unrue, editor. G. K. Hall and Company, New York. ISBN 0-7838-0022-3
- Unrue, Darlene Harbour. 1997. Critical Essays on Katherine Anne Porter. Editor, Darlene Harbour Unrue. G. K. Hall and Company, New York. ISBN 0-7838-0022-3
