= Katherine Anne Porter =

American journalist and writer (1890–1980)

- Porter in 1930
- Born: Callie Russell Porter; May 15, 1890; Indian Creek, Texas, U.S.
- Died: September 18, 1980 (aged 90); Silver Spring, Maryland, U.S.
- Occupations: Journalist; essayist; short story writer; novelist; political activist
- Spouses: John Koontz (m. 1906; div. 1915); Ernest Stock (m. 1926; div. 1927); Eugene Pressly (m. 1930; div. 1938); Albert Erskine (m. 1938; div. 1942)
- Writing career
- Years active: 1920–1977
- Notable awards: Pulitzer Prize for Fiction (1965); National Book Award (1965)

Katherine Anne Porter (born Callie Russell Porter; May 15, 1890 – September 18, 1980) was an American journalist, essayist, short story writer, novelist, poet, and political activist. Her 1962 novel Ship of Fools was the best-selling novel in the United States that year, but her short stories received much more critical acclaim. In 1966, she was awarded the Pulitzer Prize for Fiction and the U.S. National Book Award for The Collected Stories of Katherine Anne Porter.

== Biography ==
=== Early life ===
Katherine Anne Porter was born Callie Russell Porter in Indian Creek, Texas, the daughter of Harrison Boone Porter and Mary Alice (Jones) Porter. Although her father claimed maternal descent from American frontiersman Daniel Boone, Porter herself altered this alleged descent to be from Boone's brother Jonathan as "the record of his descendants was obscure, so that no-one could contradict her". This relationship was unfounded. Porter was enthusiastic about her own genealogy and family history, and spent years constructing a "quasi-official" version of her ancestry alleging descent from a companion of William the Conqueror, although "most of the genealogical connections she boasted did not exist." The writer O. Henry (born William Sydney Porter) was claimed as her father's second cousin, but later research established that "except the accident of her name", there was no connection. Despite her focus on her family history, Porter failed to identify her relationship to Lyndon B. Johnson, 36th President of the United States, his grandmother being the sister of Porter's uncle-by-marriage. The rest of Porter's family did not take her genealogical embellishments seriously, considering them to be part of her character as an "accomplished raconteur".

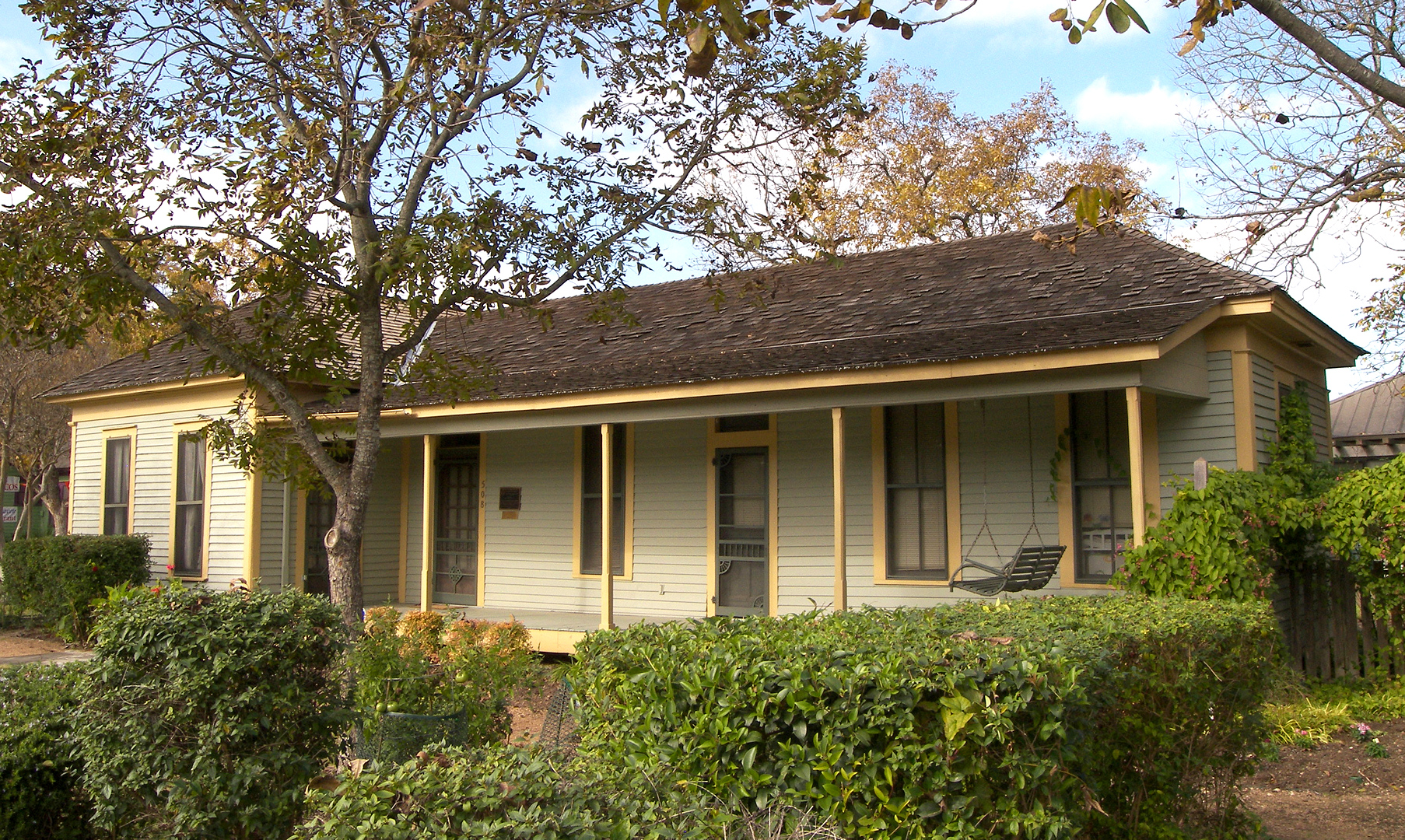
Porter's childhood home in Kyle, Texas is now a National Literary Landmark and houses the Katherine Anne Porter Literary Center.

In 1892, when Porter was two years old, her mother died two months after giving birth. Porter's father took his four surviving children (an older brother had died in infancy) to live with his mother, Catherine Ann Porter, in Kyle, Texas. The depth of her grandmother's influence can be inferred from Porter's later adoption of her name. Her grandmother died while taking 11-year-old Callie to visit relatives in Marfa, Texas.

After her grandmother's death, the family lived in several towns in Texas and Louisiana, staying with relatives or living in rented rooms. She was enrolled in free schools wherever the family was living, and for a year in 1904 she attended the Thomas School, a private Methodist school in San Antonio. This was her only formal education beyond grammar school.

=== Young adulthood and illness ===
In 1906, at the age of 16, Porter left home and married John Henry Koontz in Lufkin, Texas. She subsequently converted to his religion, Roman Catholicism. Koontz, the son of a wealthy Texas ranching family, was physically abusive; once while drunk, he threw her down the stairs, breaking her ankle. They divorced in 1915.

In 1914, she escaped to Chicago, where she worked briefly as an extra in movies. She then returned to Texas and worked the small-town entertainment circuit as an actress and singer. In 1915, she asked that her name be changed to Katherine Anne Porter as part of her divorce decree.

Also in 1915, she was diagnosed with tuberculosis and spent the following two years in sanatoria, where she decided to become a writer. It was discovered during that time that she had bronchitis, not TB. In 1917, she began writing for the Fort Worth Critic, reviewing dramas and writing society gossip. Before 1918, Porter was married to, then divorced from, T. Otto Taskett then Carl Clinton von Pless. In 1918, she wrote for the Rocky Mountain News in Denver, Colorado. While there, she almost died during the 1918 flu pandemic. When she was discharged from the hospital, she was frail and completely bald. When her hair grew back, it was white and remained so for the rest of her life. Her experience was reflected in her trilogy of short novels, Pale Horse, Pale Rider (1939), for which she received the first annual gold medal for literature in 1940 from the Society of Libraries of New York University.

=== New York and Mexico: First literary works ===
In 1919, Porter moved to Greenwich Village in New York City and made her living ghost writing, writing children's stories and doing publicity work for a motion picture company. The year in New York had a politically radicalizing effect on her; in 1920, she went to work for a magazine publisher in Mexico, where she became acquainted with members of the Mexican leftist movement, including Diego Rivera. Eventually, Porter became disillusioned with the revolutionary movement and its leaders. In the 1920s she also became intensely critical of religion, and remained so until the last decade of her life, when she again embraced the Roman Catholic Church.

Between 1920 and 1930, Porter traveled back and forth between Mexico and New York City and began publishing short stories and essays. Her first published story was "María Concepción" in The Century Magazine. In 1930, she published her first short story collection, Flowering Judas and Other Stories. An expanded edition of this collection was published in 1935 and received such critical acclaim that it alone virtually assured her place in American literature.

In 1924, Porter had an affair with Francisco Aguilera that resulted in pregnancy. In December of that year, Porter gave birth to a stillborn son. Some biographers suggest that Porter suffered several miscarriages and had an abortion. During the summer of 1926, Porter visited Connecticut with other writers and artists including Josephine Herbst, John Herrmann, and Ernest Stock, an English painter. After contracting gonorrhea from Stock, Porter had a hysterectomy in 1927, ending her hopes of ever having a child. Yet Porter's letters to her lovers suggest that she still intimated her menstruation after this alleged hysterectomy. She once told a friend, "I have lost children in all the ways one can."

=== Acclaimed writing career and teaching ===
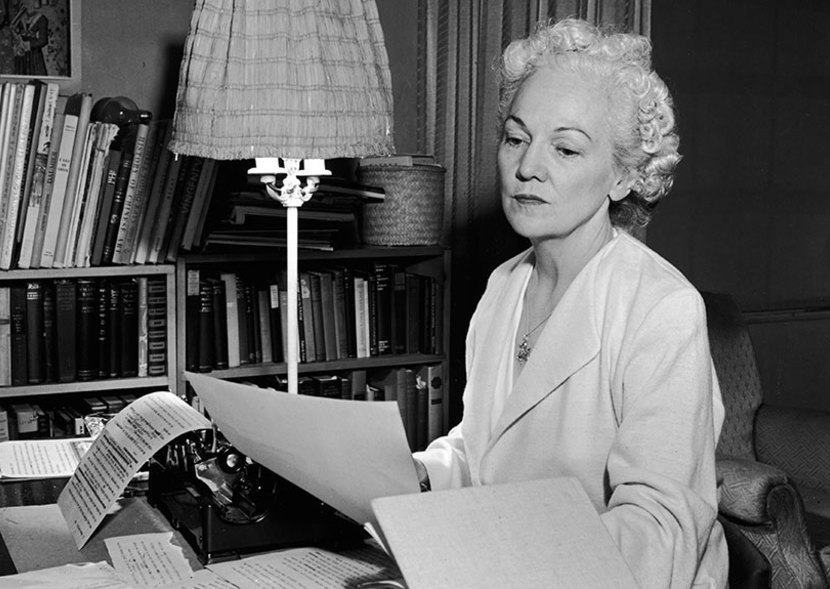
Porter in her writing room.

During the 1930s, 1940s and 1950s, Porter enjoyed a reputation as one of America's most distinguished writers, but her limited output and equally limited sales had her living on grants and advances for most of that era.

In the 1930s, Porter spent several years in Europe, during which she continued to publish short stories. She married Eugene Pressly, a writer, in 1930. In 1938, upon returning from Europe, she divorced Pressly and married Albert Russel Erskine, Jr., a graduate student. He divorced her in 1942, reportedly after discovering that she was 20 years his senior. (Note: Brewster Ghiselin wrote a poem called "The Ring" that is an allusion to the marriage-suicide.)

In 1940, Porter was a visiting lecturer at the Bread Loaf Writers' Conference in Vermont alongside W. H. Auden. She lived at the artist's retreat Yaddo for much of 1941. There she lived and worked alongside the writers Eudora Welty, Edward Newhouse, and Carson McCullers, composer Colin McPhee, and critic Newton Arvin. During the summer session, McCullers reportedly developed a romantic obsession with Porter, who was enjoying critical acclaim after the publication of Flowering Judas and Pale Horse Pale Rider. Erskine had told Porter that McCullers was a lesbian after reading her novel The Heart Is a Lonely Hunter. In letters to Erskine from Yaddo, Porter called McCullers "tiresome" and "rotten to the bone". She complained to Yaddo's administration that McCullers's attention was making her uncomfortable.

Also at Yaddo, Porter took a ride through the rural area south of Saratoga Lake, where she found her future home in Malta. She named the property "South Hill". In 1946, she sold it to author George F. Willison.

Porter became an elected member of the National Institute of Arts and Letters in 1943, and was a writer-in-residence at several colleges and universities, including the University of Chicago, the University of Michigan, and the University of Virginia.

Between 1948 and 1958, she taught at Stanford University, the University of Michigan, Washington and Lee University, and the University of Texas, where her unconventional manner of teaching made her popular with students. In 1959 the Ford Foundation granted Porter $26,000 over two years.

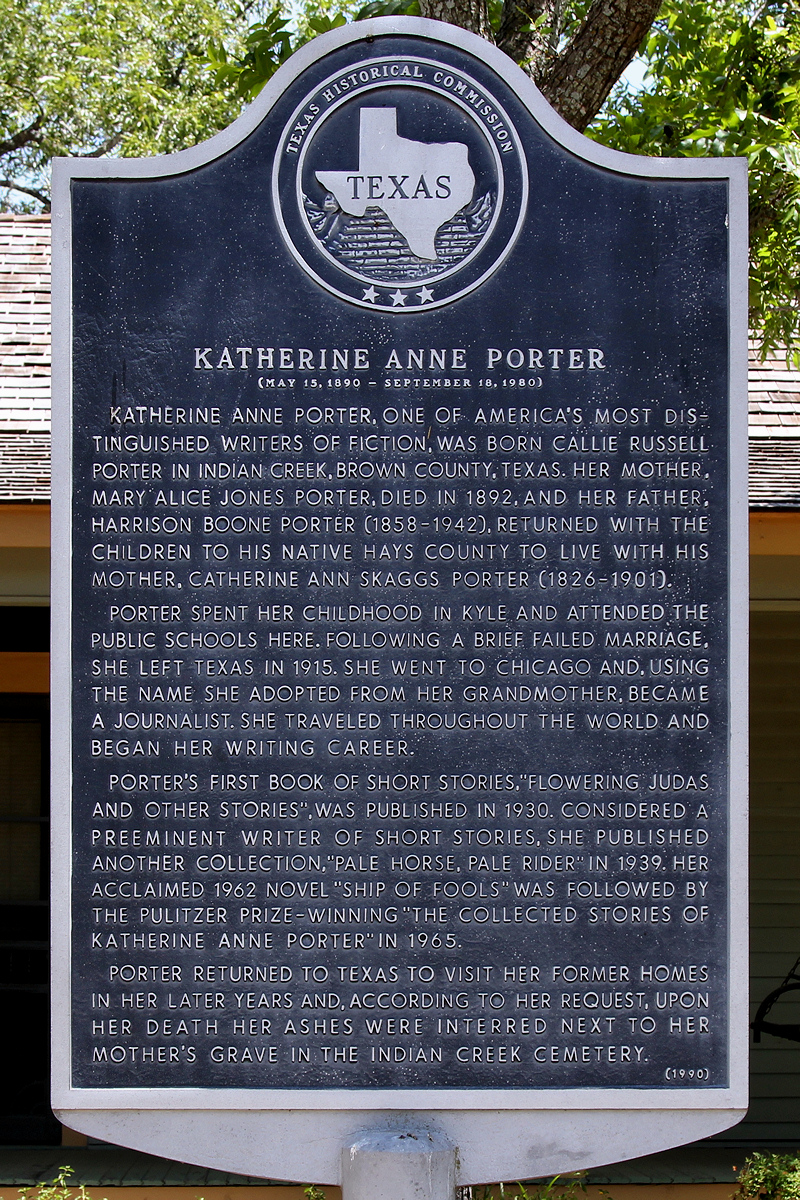
Katherine Anne Porter historical marker in Kyle, Texas

Three of Porter's stories were adapted into radio dramas on the program NBC University Theatre. "Noon Wine" was made into a one-hour drama in early 1948, and two years later, both "Flowering Judas" and "Pale Horse, Pale Rider" were produced in half-hour dramas on an episode of the hour-long program. Porter herself made two appearances on the radio series, giving critical commentary on works by Rebecca West and Virginia Woolf. In the 1950s and the 1960s, she occasionally appeared on television in programs discussing literature.

Porter published her only novel, Ship of Fools, in 1962; it was based on her memories of a 1931 ocean cruise she took from Veracruz, Mexico, to Germany on the German passenger ship SS Werra (renamed the SS Calabria in 1936 after being sold to the Italian shipping line Lloyd Triestino. The novel's success gave her financial security. She reportedly sold the film rights for $500,000. Producer David O. Selznick was after the film rights, but United Artists, who owned the property, demanded $400,000. The novel was adapted for film by Abby Mann; producer and director Stanley Kramer featured Vivien Leigh in her final film performance. (Note: The ensemble cast of Ship of Fools (1965) included Simone Signoret, José Ferrer, Lee Marvin, Oskar Werner, Michael Dunn, Elizabeth Ashley, George Segal, José Greco and Heinz Rühmann.)

Despite Porter's claim that she would not win any more prizes in the United States after the publication of Ship of Fools, she was awarded the Pulitzer Prize and the National Book Award for The Collected Stories of Katherine Anne Porter in 1966. That year, she was also appointed to the American Academy of Arts and Letters. She was nominated for the Nobel Prize in Literature five times from 1964 until 1968.

In 1966, Porter donated her literary papers to the University of Maryland. On her 78th birthday, the Katherine Anne Porter Room opened in McKeldin Library (later moved to Hornbake Library) at the University of Maryland to house many books from Porter's personal library and other items belonging to her.

In 1977, she published The Never-Ending Wrong, an account of the notorious trial and execution of Sacco and Vanzetti, which she had protested 50 years earlier.

=== Death ===
Porter had a severe stroke in 1977. After being examined by psychiatrists, she was deemed incompetent, and the court appointed her nephew Paul Porter as her guardian. Porter died in Silver Spring, Maryland, on September 18, 1980, at the age of 90, and her ashes were buried next to her mother at Indian Creek Cemetery in Texas. In 1990, Recorded Texas Historic Landmark number 2905 was placed in Brown County, Texas, to honor Porter's life and career.

== Awards and honors ==
- 1962 – Emerson-Thoreau Medal
- 1966 – Pulitzer Prize for Fiction for The Collected Stories (1965)
- 1966 – National Book Award for The Collected Stories (1965)
- 1967 – Gold Medal Award for Fiction from the American Academy of Arts and Letters
- Five nominations for the Nobel Prize in Literature (1964, 1965, 1966, 1967, 1968)
- 2006 – Porter was featured on a States postage stamp issued May 15, 2006 with a value of 39¢. She was the 22nd person featured in the Literary Arts commemorative stamp series.

== Works ==
=== Short story collections ===
- Flowering Judas (Harcourt, Brace: 1930). Includes eight of Porter's earliest short stories.
- Flowering Judas and Other Stories (Harcourt, Brace: 1935). Includes the contents of the earlier edition as well as four additional stories.
- Pale Horse, Pale Rider: Three Short Novels (Harcourt, Brace: 1939). Includes the three stories Porter referred to as short novels: "Old Mortality", "Noon Wine" (American radio, 1948; American TV, 1966; American TV, 1985), and "Pale Horse, Pale Rider" (American radio, 1950; Canadian TV, 1963 & British TV, 1964).
- The Leaning Tower and Other Stories (Harcourt, Brace: 1944). Includes nine of Porter's short stories.
- The Old Order: Stories of the South (Harcourt, Brace: 1955). Includes ten of Porter's previously published short stories, all of which take place in the American South.
- The Collected Stories of Katherine Anne Porter (Harcourt, Brace: 1964). Includes all twenty-six of Porter's previously published short stories, including the three she preferred to call short novels, as well as four additional stories.

=== Novel ===
- Ship of Fools, (Little, Brown, & Co.: 1962; (American film, 1965).

=== Nonfiction ===
- The Days Before (Harcourt, Brace: 1952). Includes many of Porter's book reviews, critical essays, memoirs, etc.
- The Collected Essays and Occasional Writings of Katherine Anne Porter (Delacorte: 1970).

=== Posthumous publications ===
- Letters of Katherine Anne Porter (Atlantic Monthly Press: 1990), edited by Isabel Bayley. Includes portions of over 250 letters Porter wrote to over sixty correspondents between 1930 and 1966.
- "This Strange, Old World" and Other Book Reviews Written by Katherine Anne Porter (University of Georgia Press, 1991), edited by Darlene Harbour Unrue. Includes almost 50 of the book reviews Porter published in various periodicals during her lifetime.
- Uncollected Early Prose of Katherine Anne Porter (University of Texas Press: 1993), edited by Ruth M. Alvarez and Thomas F. Walsh. Includes twenty-nine of Porter's prose works of fiction and nonfiction, not included in earlier published editions.
- Katherine Anne Porter's Poetry (University of South Carolina Press: 1996), edited by Darlene Harbour Unrue. Includes all thirty-two of the poems Porter published in periodicals during her lifetime.
- Porter: Collected Stories and Other Writings (Library of America: 2008). Includes the full text of "The Collected Stories of Katherine Anne Porter" (Harcourt, Brace 1964) as well as many of the pieces that were included in her two previous collections of nonfiction.
- Selected Letters of Katherine Anne Porter: Chronicles of a Modern Woman (University Press of Mississippi: 2012), edited by Darlene Harbour Unrue. Includes over 130 complete letters Porter wrote to over seventy correspondents between 1916 and 1979.

=== Other publications ===
- My Chinese Marriage by Mae Franking, ghostwritten by Porter (Duffield & Co: 1921).
- Outline of Mexican Popular Arts and Crafts (Young & McCallister: 1922).
- Katherine Anne Porter's French Song Book (Harrison of Paris: 1933). Includes seventeen French songs and Porter's English translations.
- A Christmas Story (Delacorte: 1967). Porter's story, previously published, about her niece Mary Alice Hillendahl.
- The Never-Ending Wrong (Little, Brown, & Co.: 1977). Porter's reflections upon the 1927 executions of Nicola Sacco and Bartolomeo Vanzetti.
