= Howard Moss =

American poet and dramatist

Howard Moss

Howard Moss (January 22, 1922 – September 16, 1987) was an American poet, dramatist and critic. He was poetry editor of The New Yorker magazine from 1948 until his death and he won the National Book Award in 1972 for Selected Poems.

== Biography ==
Moss was born in New York City. He attended the University of Michigan, where he won a Hopwood Award. He is credited with discovering a number of major American poets, including Anne Sexton and Amy Clampitt. He also introduced the writer William Goyen to artist Joseph Glasco.

W. H. Auden and Chester Kallman co-wrote a famously concise clerihew in his honor:

TO THE POETRY EDITOR OF THE NEW YORKER

Is Robert Lowell
Better than Noël
Coward,
Howard?

According to Edmund White, Moss was a closeted homosexual, a notion exploited in White's thinly disguised roman à clef, The Farewell Symphony, in which the character "Tom" is a prominent New York poetry editor; the "closet" characterization is at odds with the memory of literary friends who remember Moss as openly gay. Moss died of a heart attack.

== Bibliography ==
=== Poetry ===
- The Wound and the Weather (1946)
- The Toy Fair (1954)
- A Swimmer in the Air (1957)
- A Winter Come, A Summer Gone: Poems, 1946–1960 (1960)
- Finding Them Lost and Other Poems (1965)
- Second Nature (1968)
- Selected Poems (1971). Shared the National Book Award for Poetry with Frank O'Hara, The Collected Poems of Frank O'Hara.
- Buried City: Poems (1975)
- A Swim off the Rocks: Light Verse (1976)
- Rules of Sleep (1984)
- New Selected Poems (1985). Selected by Harold Bloom for inclusion in his Western Canon.

=== Plays ===
- The Folding Green (1958)
- The Oedipus Mah-Jongg Scandal (1968)
- The Palace at 4 A.M. (1972)

=== Other ===
- The Magic Lantern of Marcel Proust (1963)
- Instant Lives & More (1972)
- Whatever is Moving (1981)

=== Musical settings ===
Ned Rorem's King Midas: a cantata for voice(s) and piano on ten poems of Howard Moss (1961) is one of several settings of Moss's poetry by American composers. Allen Shearer composed his cantata King Midas (1990) on the same set of poems with addition of ancient texts. Morten Lauridsen's A Winter Come (1967) is a setting of six poems of Howard Moss for high voice and piano, while Francis Thorne's Nature Studies: Three Poems of Howard Moss (1981) is for mezzo-soprano, flute and harp.
