= George Newton Best =

American bryologist

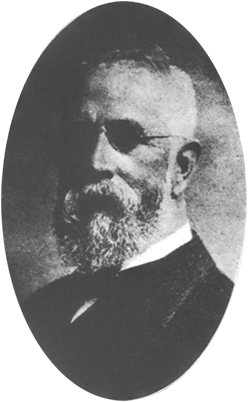
- Born: October 16, 1846; Round Valley, Clinton Township, New Jersey
- Died: June 18, 1926 (aged 79); Rosemont, Hunterdon County, New Jersey
- Education: University of Pennsylvania
- Known for: Plant taxonomy
- Scientific career
- Fields: Bryology, Medicine
- Workplaces: Riegelsville High School
- Author abbrev. (botany): Best

George Newton Best (October 16, 1846 – June 18, 1926) was an American bryologist, expert on moss taxonomy, and second president of the Sullivant Moss Society.

== Biography ==
Best attended Lafayette College for three years before leaving to teach high school in Riegelsville, Pennsylvania. He resumed his education at the University of Pennsylvania, graduating with a degree in medicine in 1875. He took up his medical practice in the Rosemont section of Delaware Township, Hunterdon County, New Jersey.

Best was also a prominent bryologist, contributing often to Torrey Botanical Club publications. He was instrumental in revising and reclassifying many moss genera, including Thuidium, Claopodium, Heterocladium, Leskea, and Pseudoleskea.

Best served as associate editor of The Bryologist from 1911 until his death, and as president of the Sullivant Moss Society from 1901 to 1902. Best was also a member of the Medical Society of New Jersey, American Medical Association, and Torrey Botanical Club. He died on June 18, 1926.

== Legacy ==
Best's personal herbarium of mosses and publications were absorbed into the collection of the New York Botanical Garden.

In 1906, botanist Broth. published Bestia, which is a genus of mosses belonging to the family Lembophyllaceae and it was named in George Newton Best's honour.

== Selected publications ==
- Best, G. (1896). Revision of the North American Thuidiums. Bulletin of the Torrey Botanical Club, 23(3), 78–90. doi:10.2307/2478118
- Best, G. (1897). Revision of the Claopodiums. Bulletin of the Torrey Botanical Club, 24(9), 427–432. doi:10.2307/2477924
- Best, G. (1900). Revision of the North American Species of Pseudoleskea. Bulletin of the Torrey Botanical Club, 27(5), 221–236. doi:10.2307/2485378
- Best, G. (1901). Revision of the North American Species of Heterocladium. Bulletin of the Torrey Botanical Club, 28(2), 123–131. doi:10.2307/2477888
- Best, G. (1901). Vegetative Reproduction of Mosses. The Bryologist, 4(1), 1º3. doi:10.2307/3238870
- Best, G. (1903). Revision of the North American Species of Leskea. Bulletin of the Torrey Botanical Club, 30(9), 463–482. doi:10.2307/2478535

The standard author abbreviation Best is used to indicate this person as the author when citing a botanical name.
