= Weymouthia =

Weymouthia is the scientific name of two genera of organism and may refer to:

- Weymouthia (plant), a genus of mosses
- Weymouthia (trilobite), a genus of trilobites
