= Camptochaete arbuscula =

Scientific classification
- Kingdom: Plantae
- Division: Bryophyta
- Class: Bryopsida
- Subclass: Bryidae
- Order: Hypnales
- Family: Lembophyllaceae
- Genus: Camptochaete
- Species: C. arbuscula

Binomial name
- Camptochaete arbuscula (Sm.) Reichardt, 1870

Species of moss

Camptochaete arbuscula is a species of moss found in New Zealand and Australia.

== Description ==
Camptochaete arbuscula is a robust moss with light green or straw-coloured leaves, 2 mm long, concave, with a faint, double leaf vein. Its wiry stems have pinnately branching fronds. The sporophytes are produced on the lower sides of the fronds.

== Distribution and habitat ==
It occurs as an epiphyte on logs in moist forests. It is widespread in New Zealand. In Australia, collections have been made in Queensland, New South Wales, Victoria, and Tasmania.
