= Rosemont, New Jersey =

Rosemont, New Jersey may refer to:

- Rosemont, Hunterdon County, New Jersey
- Rosemont, Mercer County, New Jersey
