= Camptochaete monolina =

Scientific classification
- Kingdom: Plantae
- Division: Bryophyta
- Class: Bryopsida
- Subclass: Bryidae
- Order: Hypnales
- Family: Lembophyllaceae
- Genus: Camptochaete
- Species: C. monolina

Binomial name
- Camptochaete monolina Meagher & Cairns

Species of moss

Camptochaete monolina is a species of moss found in the Wet Tropics of Australia.

== Description ==
Camptochaete monolina is a large moss (to 110 mm) with stem and branches covered in overlapping orbiculate to suborbiculate leaves. A robust midrib extends to 60% of the leaf length.

== Distribution and habitat ==
It occurs as an lithophyte in simple microphyll vine-forest on Mount Bellenden Ker, Wooroonooran National Park, Far North Queensland.
