= River Lyd, Devon =

River in Devon, England

River Lyd
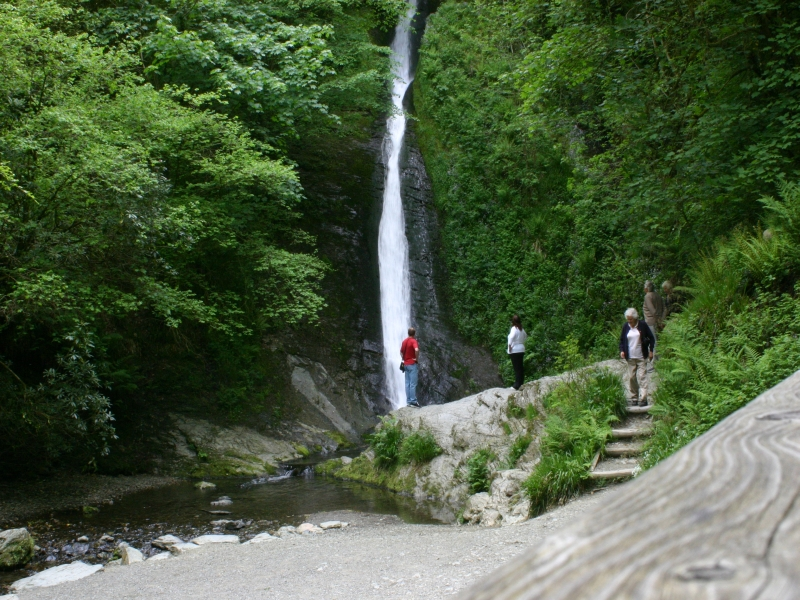
- The White Lady Waterfall at Lydford Gorge

- Location within Devon Location within the United Kingdom

Location
- Country: England
- County: Devon

Physical characteristics
- Source
  - location: Lyd Head, Dartmoor
- Mouth: River Tamar
  - location: Near Lifton
  - coordinates: 50.633°N 4.2996°W

The Lyd is a river rising at Lyd Head (Corn Ridge in NW Dartmoor) in the Dartmoor national park in Devon in South West England and flowing into the River Tamar beyond Lifton. It runs through Lydford Gorge, the deepest gorge in South West England.

== Lydford Gorge ==
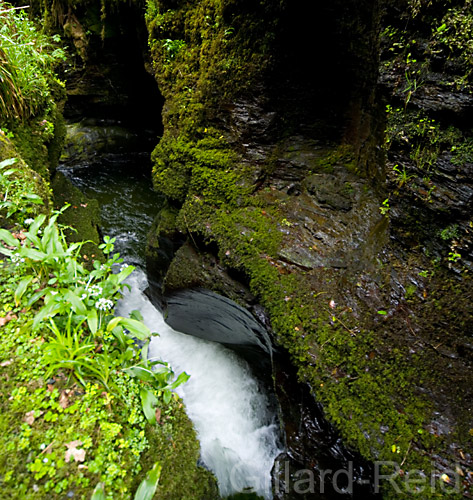
Lydford Gorge (detail)

Lydford Gorge (National Trust) is a dramatic feature of the river at Lydford on the edge of the Dartmoor National Park; it is a 1.5-mile (2.4 km) gorge near Lydford on the River Lyd, which is the deepest in South West England. It was formed by the process of river capture, where the start of a nearby river eroded backwards until its origin met the Lyd, diverting its course into the second channel.

Owned and maintained by the National Trust since 1947, the gorge features the 100-foot (30 m) tall White Lady Waterfall and a series of whirlpools known as the Devil's Cauldron.

=== Protected area ===
Lydford Gorge is designated as a Site of Special Scientific Interest (SSSI) because of its complex geology and also because of the moss and liverwort species recorded here.

==== Biology ====
Ancient woodland is found on the valley sides of the gorge where tree species include pedunculate oak, ash, hazel and holly. Herbaceous woodland species include wood anemone, woodruff, bluebell and bilberry. In wet areas, opposite-leaved golden saxifrage has been recorded.

Moss species include Mnium stellare and Isothecium holtii (genus Isothecium). Liverwort species include Trichocolea tomentella. Lichen species include Sticta dufourii that occurs on damp rocks.

Bird species in this protected area include raven, buzzard, wood warbler, grey wagtail and dipper. Otters have been recorded in the river Lyd.

==== Geology ====
Rock strata exposed in Lydford gorge include different layers of slate from the Devonian period including the Liddaton Formation and the Whitelady Formation. Thrusts during the Variscan orogeny have caused major dislocations in the rock successions here.

== See also ==
- List of waterfalls
- List of waterfalls in the United Kingdom
