= Willard H. Allen =

American state secretary of agriculture

New Jersey Secretary of Agriculture
- In office January 1, 1938 – February 1, 1956
- Governor: A. Harry Moore; Charles Edison; Alfred E. Driscoll; Robert B. Meyner
- Preceded by: William B. Duryee
- Succeeded by: Phillip Alampi

Personal details
- Born: January 19, 1893 Danbury, Connecticut, US
- Died: February 25, 1957 (aged 64) Raritan Township, New Jersey
- Education: University of Connecticut
- Occupation: Poultry scientist, agriculture commissioner

Willard Harry Allen (January 19, 1893 – February 25, 1957) was an American poultry scientist who served as New Jersey secretary of agriculture from 1938 to 1956.

== Life and career ==
Allen was born in Danbury, Connecticut, and graduated from Connecticut Agricultural College, now the University of Connecticut, in 1916. He worked as an extension specialist for poultry husbandry at the University of Georgia before enlisting in the US Army and serving overseas during World War I.

Following his military service, Allen worked as poultry extension specialist first at Connecticut and then for Rutgers University from 1921 to 1927. He served as director of research for Acetol Products in New Brunswick, New Jersey, from 1927 to 1934, when he returned to Rutgers as a full professor of poultry science and state leader of county agricultural agents. He was appointed to lead the federal agricultural adjustment administration for New Jersey that same year.

On January 1, 1938, Governor Harold G. Hoffman appointed Allen to the office of state secretary of agriculture of New Jersey. A popular official and capable administrator, Allen served for 18 years under six governors, both Republicans and Democrats. As secretary of agriculture, he strengthened the connections between farmers and industry, educated the public about the role of agriculture in the state's economy, and revived the New Jersey Agricultural Association in 1940.

Allen served as secretary of the New Jersey Poultry Association, vice president of the New Jersey Chamber of Commerce, and director of various national agricultural organizations. He received separate commendations for distinguished service from the New Jersey Agricultural Society and from the state board of agriculture in January 1956. He was awarded an honorary doctorate in science from Rutgers in 1953. In addition, Allen served as president of UConn's alumni association from 1938 to 1940 and received the Distinguished Alumni Award in 1956.

== Death and legacy ==
Allen resigned due to ill health on February 1, 1956. He died a year later of a heart attack at the Hunterdon Medical Center.

The Willard H. Allen Memorial Auditorium at the Hunterdon Medical Center was dedicated in 1958. The University of Connecticut has a scholarship dedicated to his memory, along with a residence hall, though the hall may have been named after Ethan Allen instead.

A resident of the Rosemont section of Delaware Township (in Hunterdon County), Allen never married and had no children.
