= Rigodium =

Scientific classification
- Kingdom: Plantae
- Division: Bryophyta
- Class: Bryopsida
- Subclass: Bryidae
- Order: Hypnales
- Family: Lembophyllaceae
- Genus: Rigodium; Kunze ex Schwaegr.

Genus of mosses

Rigodium is a genus of mosses. Species in this genus are usually epiphytic or terrestrial, generally growing in moist forests. Rigodium has a disjunct distribution in the Americas and Africa, and its center of diversity, where all species occur, is in the Andes of central Chile. The genus has been placed in several different families, such as the Brachytheciaceae, Thuidiaceae and Rigodiaceae but molecular phylogenetics work support its placement in the Lembophyllaceae. Rigodium implexum is notable for developing mossballs that carpet the forest floor. These consist in single, highly branched plants of 10–20 cm in diameter that are detached from the soil, and in Chile are known as lana del pobre (wool of the poor).

== Species ==
The species in the genus Rigodium are:

- Rigodium toxarion (Schwagr.) Jaeg
- Rigodium brachypodium (C. Mull.) Par
- Rigodium adpressum Zomlefer
- Rigodium implexum Kunze ex Schwagr
- Rigodium pseudo-thuidium Dus
