= Benjamin Riegel House =

Historic house in Pennsylvania, United States

- U.S. National Register of Historic Places
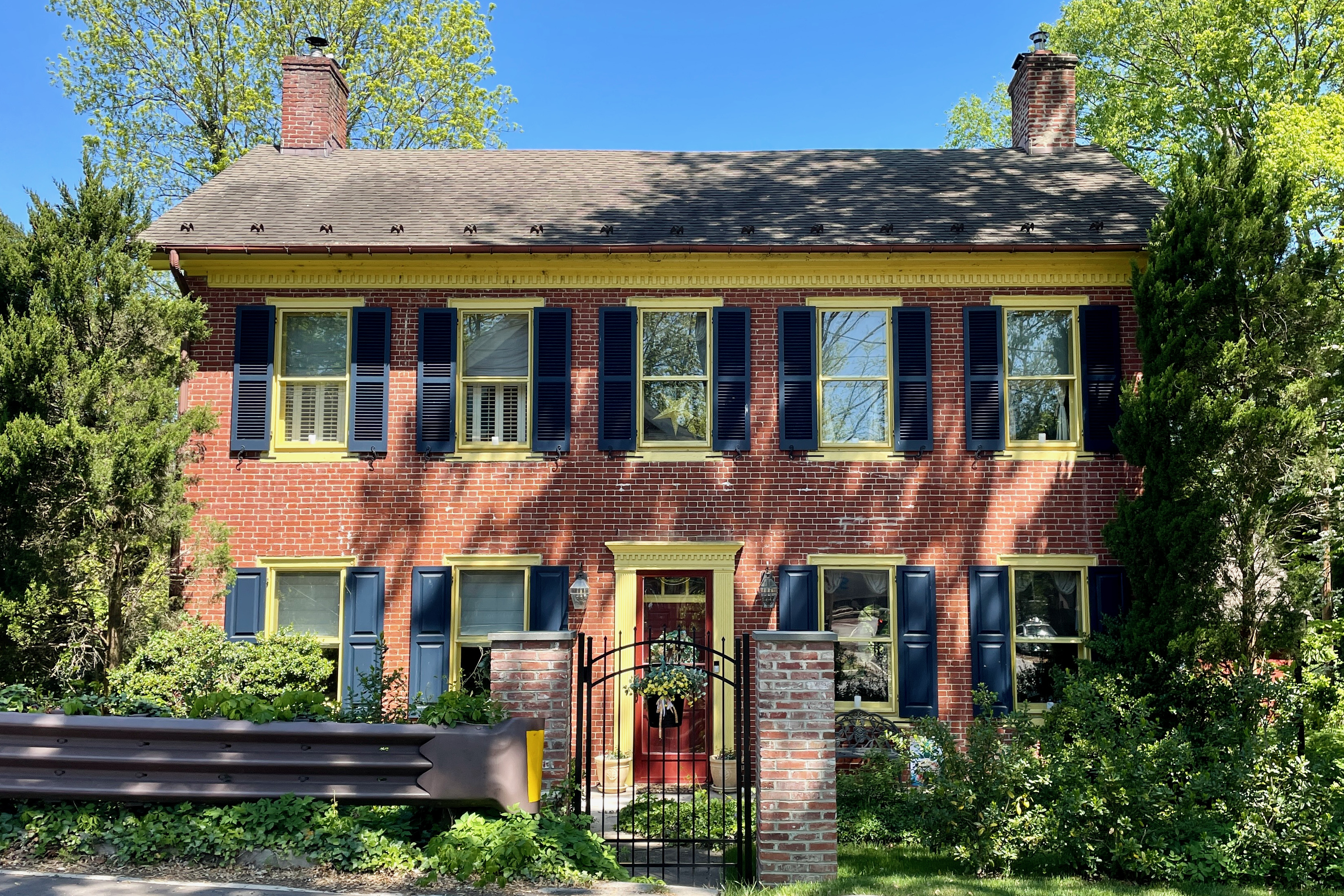
- Benjamin Riegel House in 2021

- Location within Pennsylvania Location within the United States
- Location: 29 Delaware Road, Riegelsville, Pennsylvania, U.S.
- Coordinates: 40°35′41.2″N 75°11′33.1″W
- Area: 1.2 acres (0.49 ha)
- Built: 1832
- Architectural style: Vernacular Georgian
- NRHP reference No.: 86003569
- Added to NRHP: January 6, 1987

Benjamin Riegel House is a historical home built in 1832 in Riegelsville, Pennsylvania in the Lehigh Valley region of eastern Pennsylvania.

The house was constructed in Georgian style house. Benjamin Riegel, its initial owner and resident, was a miller by trade, owned several area mills, and was instrumental in the development of Riegelsville, Pennsylvania and Riegelsville, New Jersey. He resided in the house until his death in 1860; his widow resided there until her death two decades later, in 1880.

In 1986, in recognition of the home's historical significance, it was listed on the National Register of Historic Places. Since 2010, the property has been privately owned by Dr. and Mrs. Neal Azrolan.

== Description ==
Built in 1832, the house bears resemblance to the "I" houses that was common to early homes in eastern Pennsylvania and New Jersey. Deeper and containing a more formal interior than the typical "I" house, its structure differs in the use of decorative trim and the use of building materials. In choosing brick, Riegel opted for a building material common at the time to urban areas outside of Bucks County but uncommon to Upper Bucks and the Musconetcong area due to the proliferation of native stone and wood. The result was a graceful building befitting the owner's successful miller and merchant status. The Riegel house resembles several Riegel family stone farmhouses in Lower Saucon Township, Pennsylvania, in size and form but appears to have been influenced more by the styles of more urban areas at the time, especially in Philadelphia and Burlington, New Jersey, where the use of brick proliferated.

In keeping with the urban orientation of the house, the barn is diminutive with its size indicating its purpose was for personal, rather than agricultural, use.

The Benjamin Riegel House is a 2 1/2-story, five-bay, brick structure located at 29 Delaware Road. The house and its outbuildings stand on a strip of land bordered to the east the Delaware River and to the west by the Delaware Division Canal. It is one of the earliest and most substantial dwellings to be erected in the settlement which became Riegelsville.

The residence exhibits several vernacular Georgian building characteristics and decorative features, including balanced front and side façades, a centered front door with an entablature supported by pilasters, horizontally and vertically aligned windows, a gabled roof, and interior end chimneys. The original section, erected in 1832, has a rectangular plan of 40' by 24'. A two-story ell was added to the rear of the house prior to 1860. There is a shed roofed porch, replaced in 1985, on the rear at the junction of the original section and the ell addition. To the rear of the house are situated a barn circa 1832 and shed which appears to date from the time of the ell addition.

== Exterior ==
The exterior façade of the house is brick. The front façade is Flemish bond while the side and rear facades are common bond. The exterior bears a few restrained decorative details including a box cornice with dentil molding, the latter on the front façade only, windows set off with a simple architrave, and a belt or drip course on the west façade. The surrounds of the front door of the original section facing the main road and the side door of the ell addition facing the canal are of equal restraint, featuring entablatures with dentils, fluted pilasters, and paneled reveals and headers. The rear doors are surrounded by simple architrave trim. The front and rear doors of the original section are centered. The latter is diminutive, paneled, and glazed with one large pane. All 32 windows in the house have 1/1 sash. The bays of the front and side facades of the original section are equally spaced with upper level bays set directly above those below. This treatment is duplicated on the west wall of the ell addition with two bays on each story.

The fenestration of the main section's rear façade was originally balanced, with three bays. It is partially obscured by the addition and displays a window on the first story with a second story window set directly above. Above the rear door is a diminutive window set at the staircase and to the left of the rear door is a circa 1920 small single pane window. The fenestration of the north and east walls of the addition is irregular. The north wall contains a single window which is set at the second story while the east wall contains one door on the first story with no bay above and one window on the first story with a window, not set directly above, on the second story. The doors on the west and east facades of the addition are both paneled and glazed with single panes. The original section features four fireplaces, two on each floor at gable ends, and has a full basement with a native stone foundation. Joists in the attic and basement are hand-cut. Roof rafters at the peak are held together with pegs.

Contained in the full length center hall of this section is an open well, two flight staircase which features a simple newel post, mahogany handrail, plain balusters, and side paneling with applied molding. The hall is flanked by two parlors on the first floor and two bedrooms on the second. A powder room was erected on the first floor off the center hall circa 1920.

The ell addition was erected over a crawl space, with notched and nailed roof rafters supporting a gable roof. The addition is composed of a bathroom and dressing room on the second floor and a kitchen on the first floor. The interior walls of both sections are of smoothly finished plaster and decorated with quirk beaded chair rails and baseboards. Ceilings on both the first and second floors are ten feet high. The trim of the fireplace in the east bedroom features colonettes, a convex frieze, bed-molding, and mantle shelf. Decorative painting has been uncovered on the frieze and trim of the fireplace in the west bedroom as well as on the window and door trim and baseboards of the room. The floors are of random width boards of long leaf yellow pine, some up to 18" in width.

== Outbuildings ==
Complementing the house are two outbuildings, a bank barn and a shed. The barn is 30' by 30', two and one half stories, and is of frame construction on a stone foundation. It has post and beam construction with pegged mortise and tenon joints. Structural joists are hand-hewn oak and black walnut timbers with adze marks and original bark plainly visible. The 12' by 14' one story frame shed is erected on a stone foundation and features post and beam construction, nailed joints, and open eave exposed rafters.

Exterior alterations to the house and its outbuildings for the most part have been associated with the numerous floods of the Delaware River and as such are part of the house's history. There are no visible effects of the various floods on the interior. Damage caused by the flood of 1903 necessitated the replacement of windows and several doors. At the same time, the brick exterior was painted and one story, hipped roof porches were added to the front and west façades. The flood of 1936 damaged the northeast wall of the barn's stone foundation and resulted in the wall's partial replacement with poured concrete.

A one-story shed roof enclosed porch was added to the rear of the house in the late nineteenth century, encompassing the cistern. Damage caused by the flood of 1955 necessitated the removal of all three porches. As part of the clean-up from the flood, the exterior paint was removed with an unknown cleaning material. The methodology was changed after workers damaged the surface of the brick on a portion of the east façade of the rear addition. The shed, swept off its foundation and moved several blocks by the 1955 flood, was subsequently returned to its original location. The current one-story porch, glass-enclosed with a metal shed roof, at the rear of the house, is situated on the site of the nineteenth-century porch and a c. 1960 replacement. None of these alterations has greatly affected the integrity of the structure itself or its vernacular Georgian features.

== Restorations and Improvements ==
In 1985, restoration work was undertaken on both the exterior and interior. Louvered shutters which were not original were removed due to their poor condition and were replaced with vernacular Georgian replicas. The exterior door surrounds on the front and west façades were duplicated to replace rotted woodwork. The circa 1903 front door was replaced. Following the outlines on the paneled reveals of the front entranceway, a transom, and solid wood door of original scale were installed. A redundant door on the rear façade of the original section, which had replaced a window at an unknown date, was replaced with a round-headed window without altering the opening. The brick of the upper third of each fireplace chimney was re-pointed. In the interior, layers of paint and varnish were removed from the floor boards. The trim in the center and upper hall, the west parlor and both bedrooms was repainted to match original paint colors. Following outlines on the walls and portions remaining under window sills, missing chair rails in the rooms of the original section were replaced. A partition erected at an unknown date in the west bedroom dividing it into two small rooms was removed as was a similar partition in the first floor east parlor. While replacing rotted floor joists in the kitchen wing, a sagging wall which divided the space into two small kitchen and dining areas was removed and not replaced.

Additional restorations and improvements we performed during the ownership of the Azrolans. In 2016, the kitchen was updated with a custom soapstone countertop, a new Jenn-Air range, as well as a new Kitchen-Aid dishwasher. In addition, a permanent 22 kW propane-powered generator was installed on a platform above the flood zone. The electric system was upgraded to 200 Amps, and circuit breakers were rewired above flood level. Seven mini-splits were installed away from the façade to provide heat and air-conditioning comfort for Dr. Azrolan and his wife Caroline. The main bath was remodeled and a claw-foot bathtub was installed to better represent the Georgian character of the home. In 2017 the house wood and the barn were repaired and then repainted with Georgian-era appropriate colors, and the shutters and their hardware were stripped and repainted.

In 2018, the wooden front and driveway gates, which were not consistent with Georgian vernacular, were replaced with matching metal gates and reclaimed brick pillars. In addition, a safety handrail was installed by the stairs to the deck. The dock and their stairs, destroyed during the flood of 2011, were replaced with an improved and durable set of stairs and a larger dock in 2019.

In 2020, a wood stove insert was installed in the living room fireplace, a register was installed to conduct heat to the second floor, and the chimneys were relined. These alterations have improved the integrity of the property itself, and have restored many of its vernacular Georgian features.

== History ==
Benjamin Riegel's association with the property began in 1822 when he purchased a 69-acre parcel of land that was formerly part of the Durham Tract. The southeast corner bordered a small settlement called Riegel's Ferry and was across the Delaware River from a settlement called Musconetcong where Riegel was living at the time.

Riegel was born on his father's farm in Northampton County, Pennsylvania, in 1792, a third generation Pennsylvania German. He joined the large movement of Germans from Buchs and Northampton counties in Pennsylvania and New Jersey, purchasing a farm, and in 1823, purchasing a grist, saw, and oil mill complex in Musconetcong. Riegel built several homes in Musconetcong and "was so prominent a figure in the advancement of the interests of the place that its name was changed to Riegelsville in his honor."

Riegel moved back to Pennsylvania upon completion of the home's construction in 1832. The same year, the settlement was renamed Riegelsville in his honor. It consisted of a ferry landing and stone tavern house, both of which were operated by Riegel's uncle, Benjamin Riegel, a farmer. A small store house was erected by Riegel to house products from his mills and to serve the growing Delaware River and canal trade.

After returning to Pennsylvania, Riegel continued operating his New Jersey mill complex until its sale to his son in 1843. The mill supplied wood for Riegel's house and sits subsequent construction in Riegelsville, Pennsylvania. Riegel also owned grist mills in present-day Lower Saucon Township, Pennsylvania from 1836 to 1842 and in Durham from 1845 to 1855. The Durham Mill and Furnace is listed on the National Register of Historic Places.

Through Riegel's direct and often singular involvement, the settlement evolved into a busy community offering stores, churches, postal service and bridge transportation. In 1834, he commissioned a surveyor to lay out twenty-four building lots on the southwestern portion of his tract which were soon after conveyed and developed by people who became the town's earliest settlers.

In 1877, land owned by others to the south and west was subdivided and made available to the public. He invested in and served as one of four directors of the Riegelsville Delaware River Bridge Co. from its inception in 1836 until his death in 1860. This company built one of the first river bridges in 1838, significantly improving transportation and communication throughout the area and providing an impetus for Riegelsville's development. Riegel was one of the founders of the German Reformed congregation in Riegelsville and was instrumental in the building of the original church structure in 1850. He donated the land for the first churches of both the Presbyterian and Reformed congregations and the land that later was allocated for the town cemetery. Both buildings continue to serve the community; the German Reformed church has been converted to the borough's fire house, and the Presbyterian and Reformed church still serves as a community church. Riegel also served as the town postmaster from 1848 until 1859.

Riegel resided in the house until his death in 1860, and his widow lived there until here death in 1880. In 1880, the house was inherited by Riegel's son, John L. Riegel, who lived there during his teenage years while apprenticing at his father's mills.

In 1866, John L. Riegel installed paper machinery in his late father's New Jersey saw mill and began the manufacture of jute paper. By his death in 1893, his operation, which became known as the Riegel Paper Corporation and included three paper mills, was one of the largest employers in the region. The employment opportunities at the mills resulted in the continued growth of Riegelsville in the late 19th century. John L. Riegel followed in his father's footsteps as the town's leading citizen, founding a preparatory academy which operated from 1883 until 1916 and establishing the Riegelsville Library, which remains in existence. He was a supporter of the local Reformed congregation and instrumental in the erection of its new church and parsonage in the 1870s. He replaced his father on the board of the bridge company and was also one of the original stockholders and directors of Bethlehem Steel, headquartered nearby in Bethlehem, Pennsylvania, and other local manufacturing businesses. While Riegel lived elsewhere in Riegelsville, he maintained the house. Various Riegel family retainers and tenants later lived there from 1880 until 1985. Benjamin Riegel's great-great-grandson lived in the house as late as the 1990s.

In 1987, in recognition of the historical significance of the house, it was added to the National Register of Historic Places.

== Gallery ==
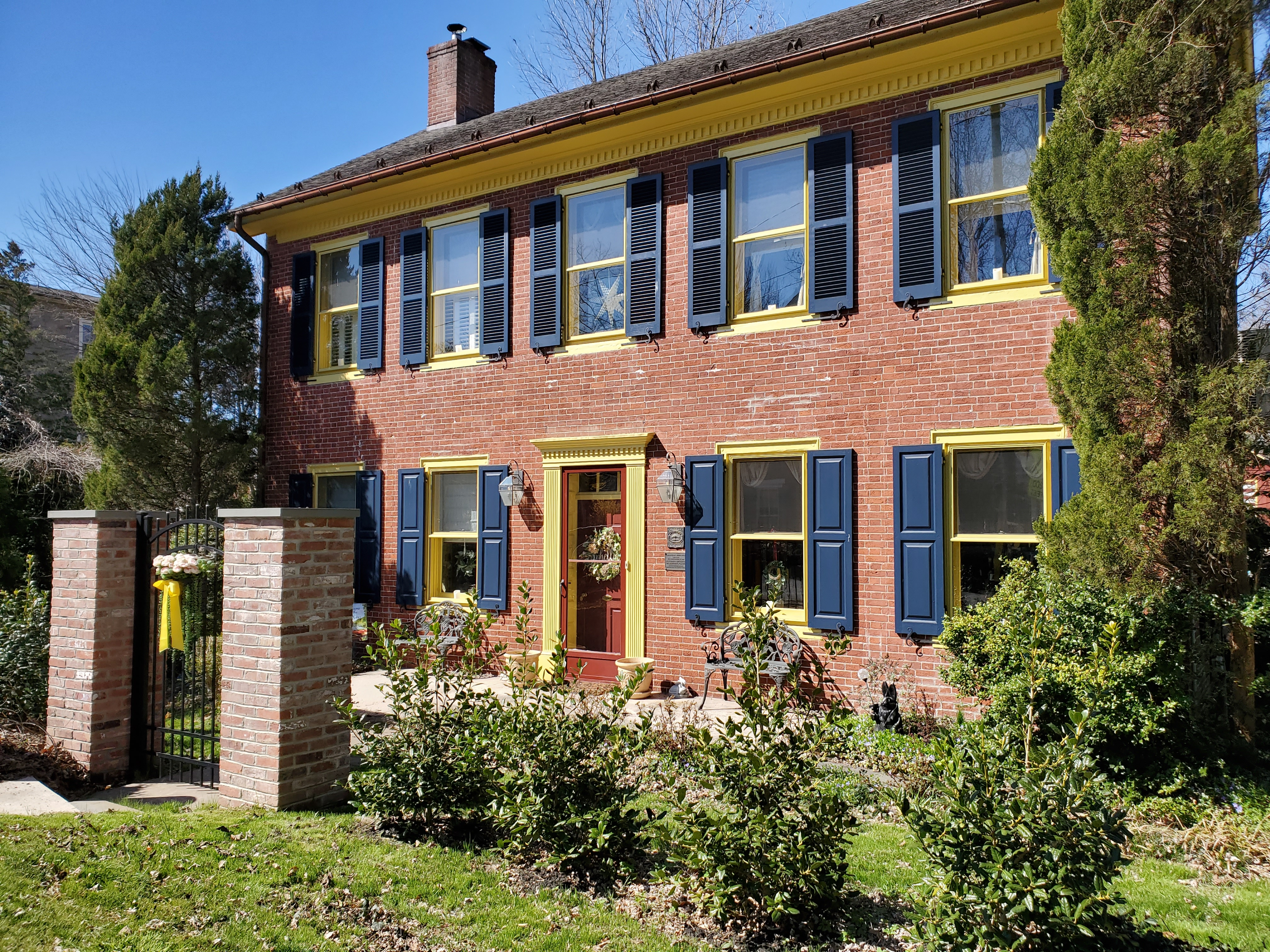
Benjamin Riegel House 2020

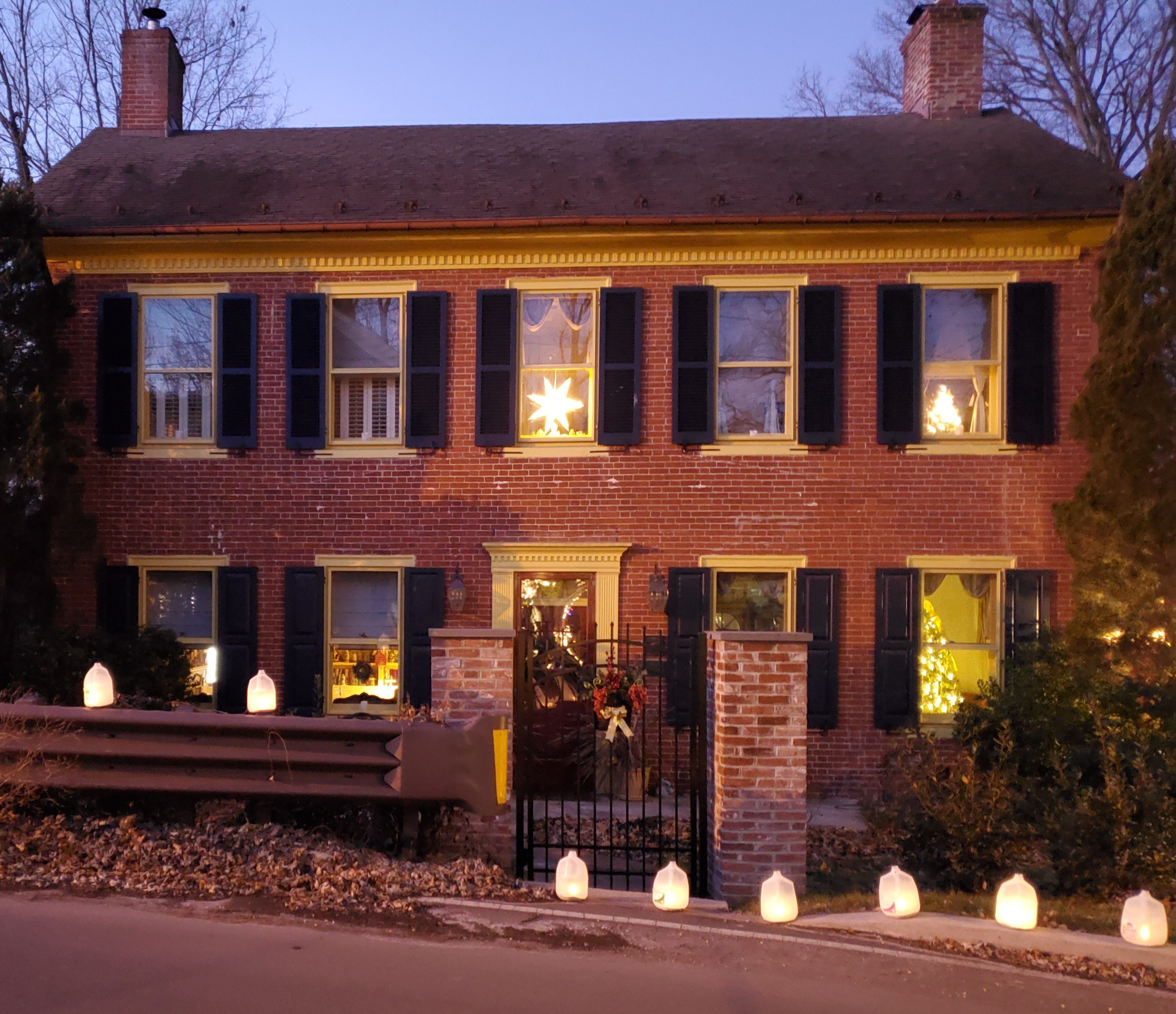
Benjamin Riegel House at Christmas 2019

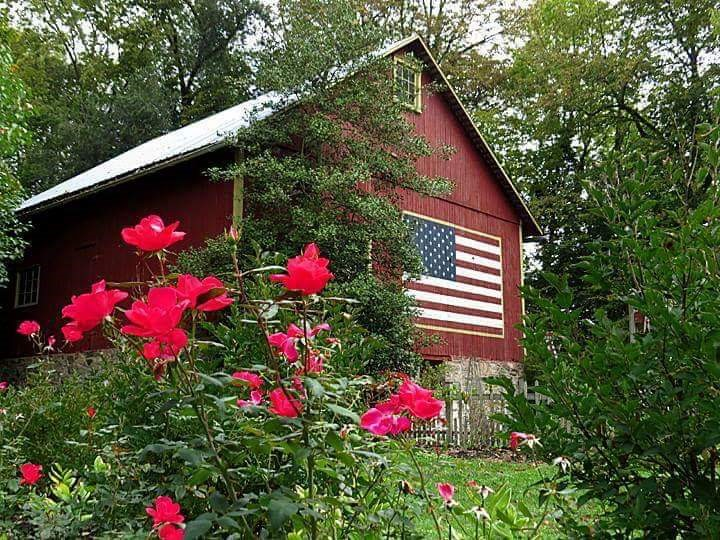
Barn (Photograph courtesy of Carole Mebus)

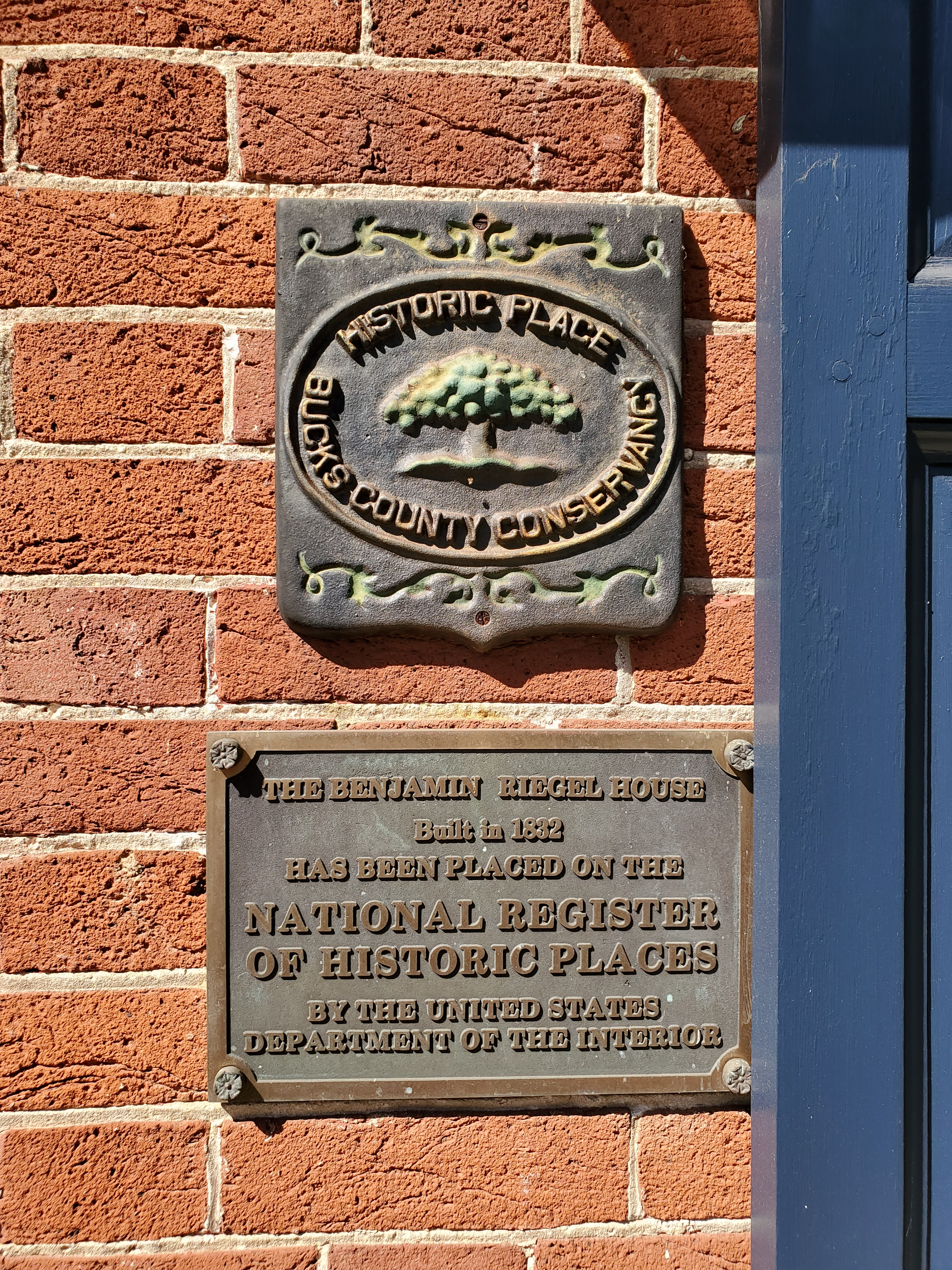
Benjamin Riegel House Historic Registry

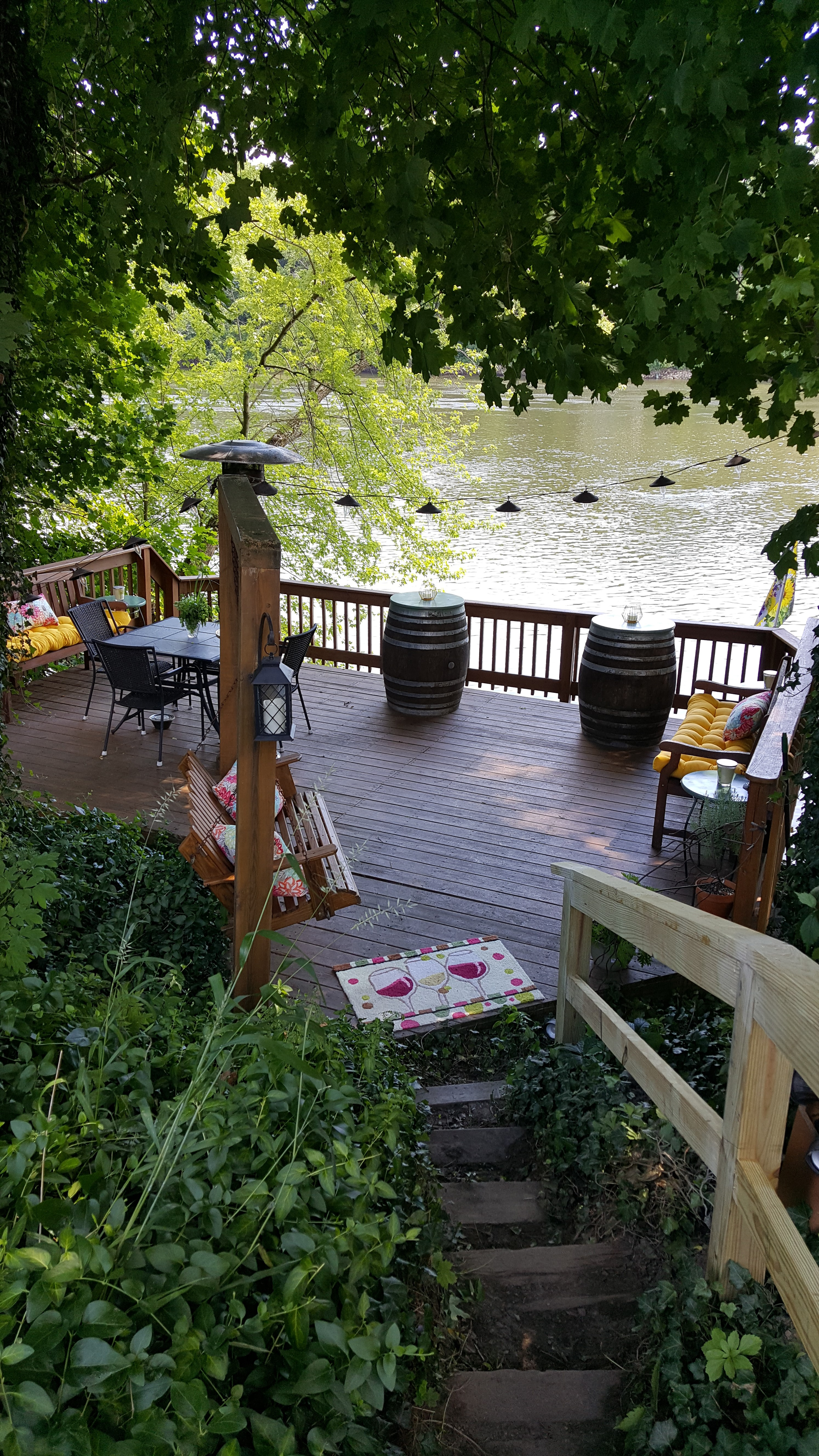
Deck

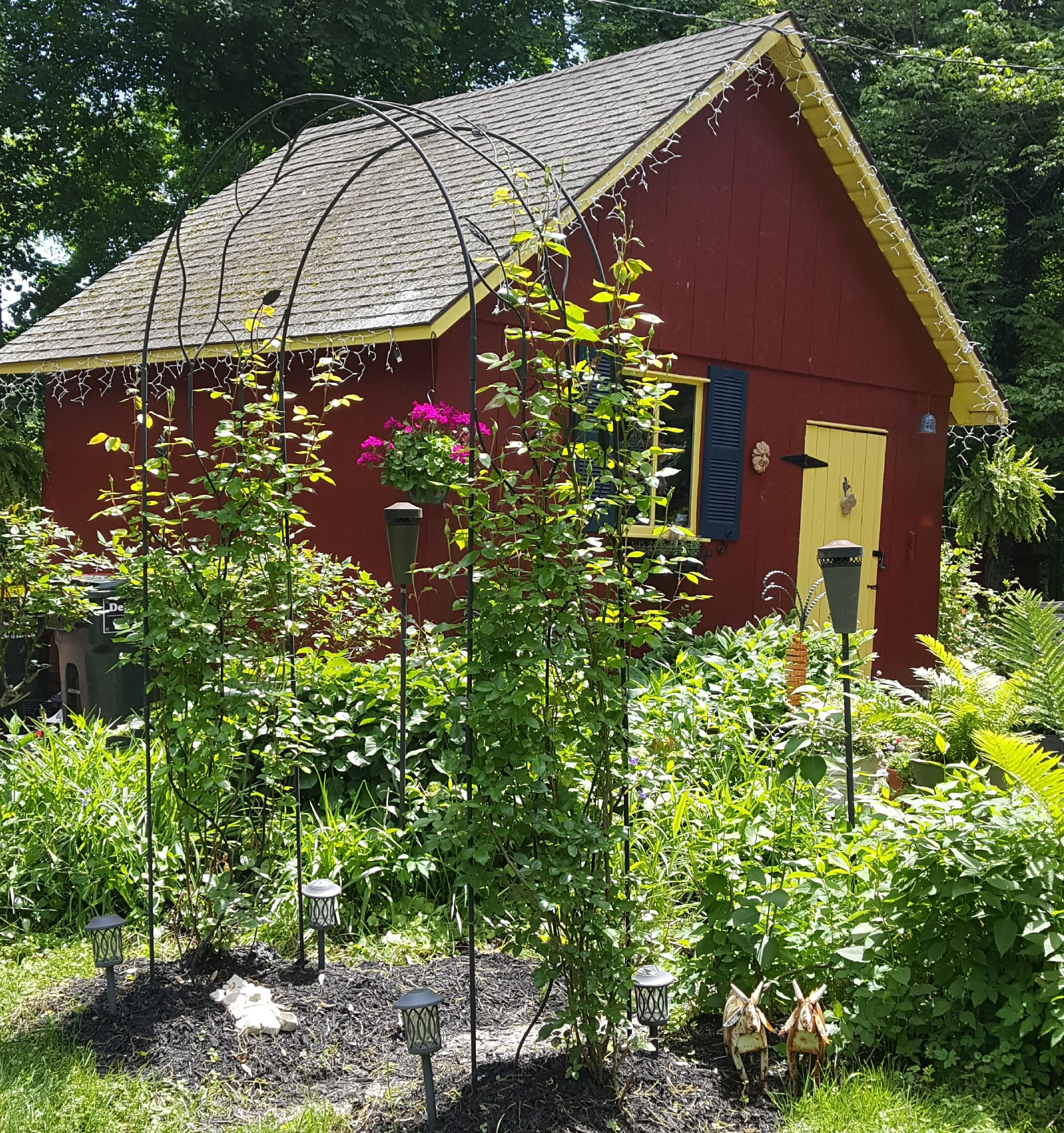
Shed

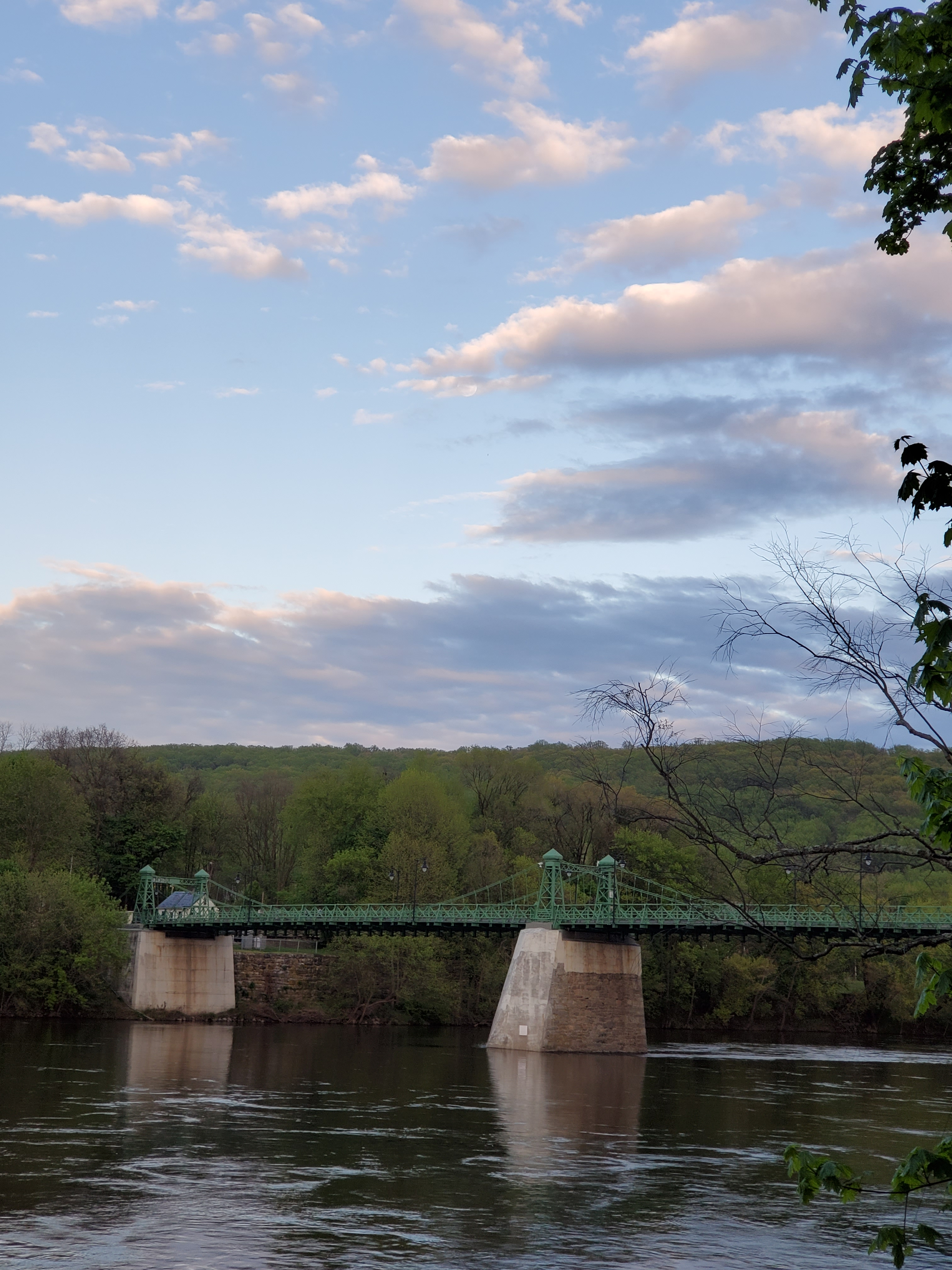
The Riegelsville Bridge

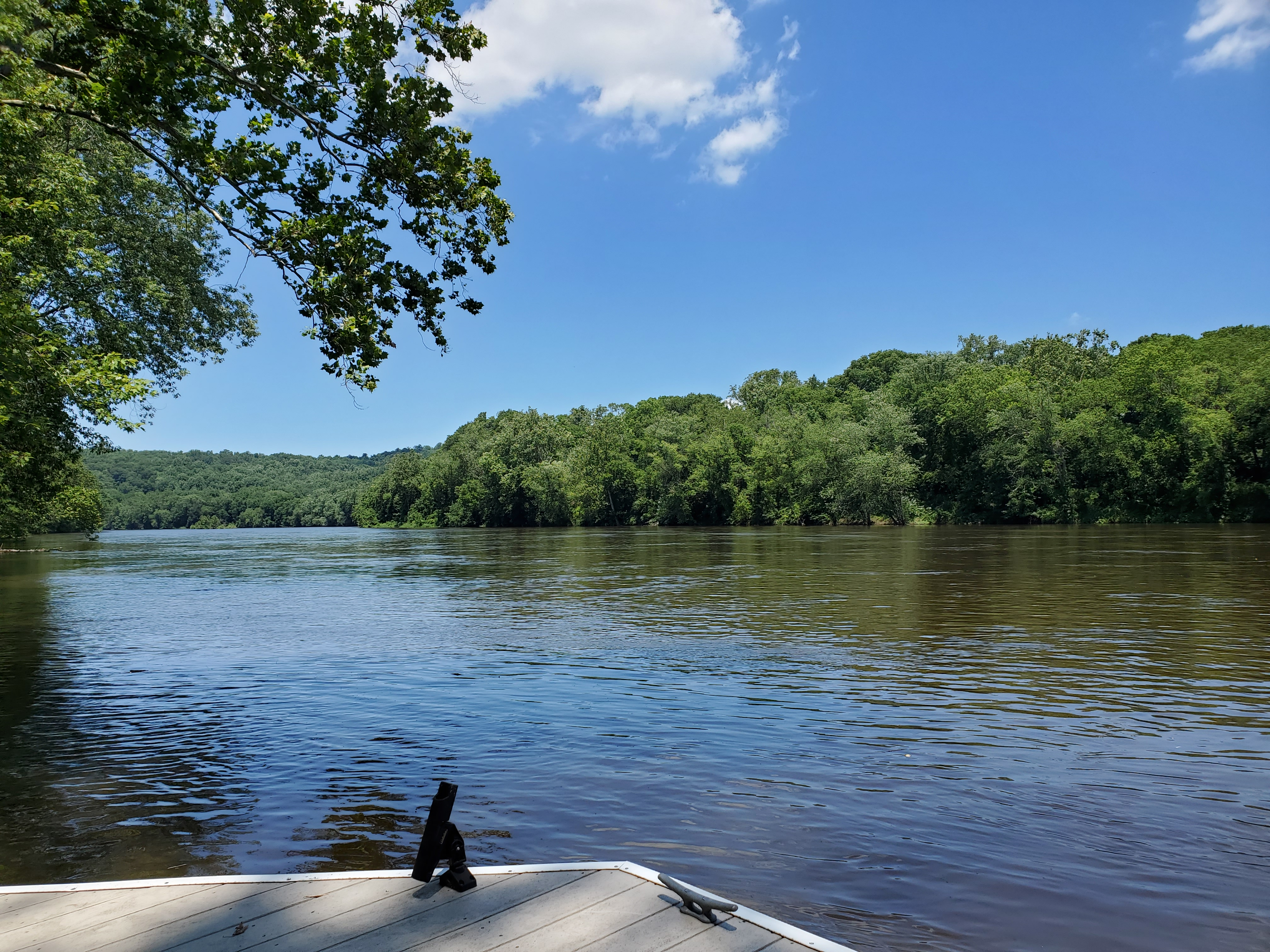
View of the Delaware River from the dock
