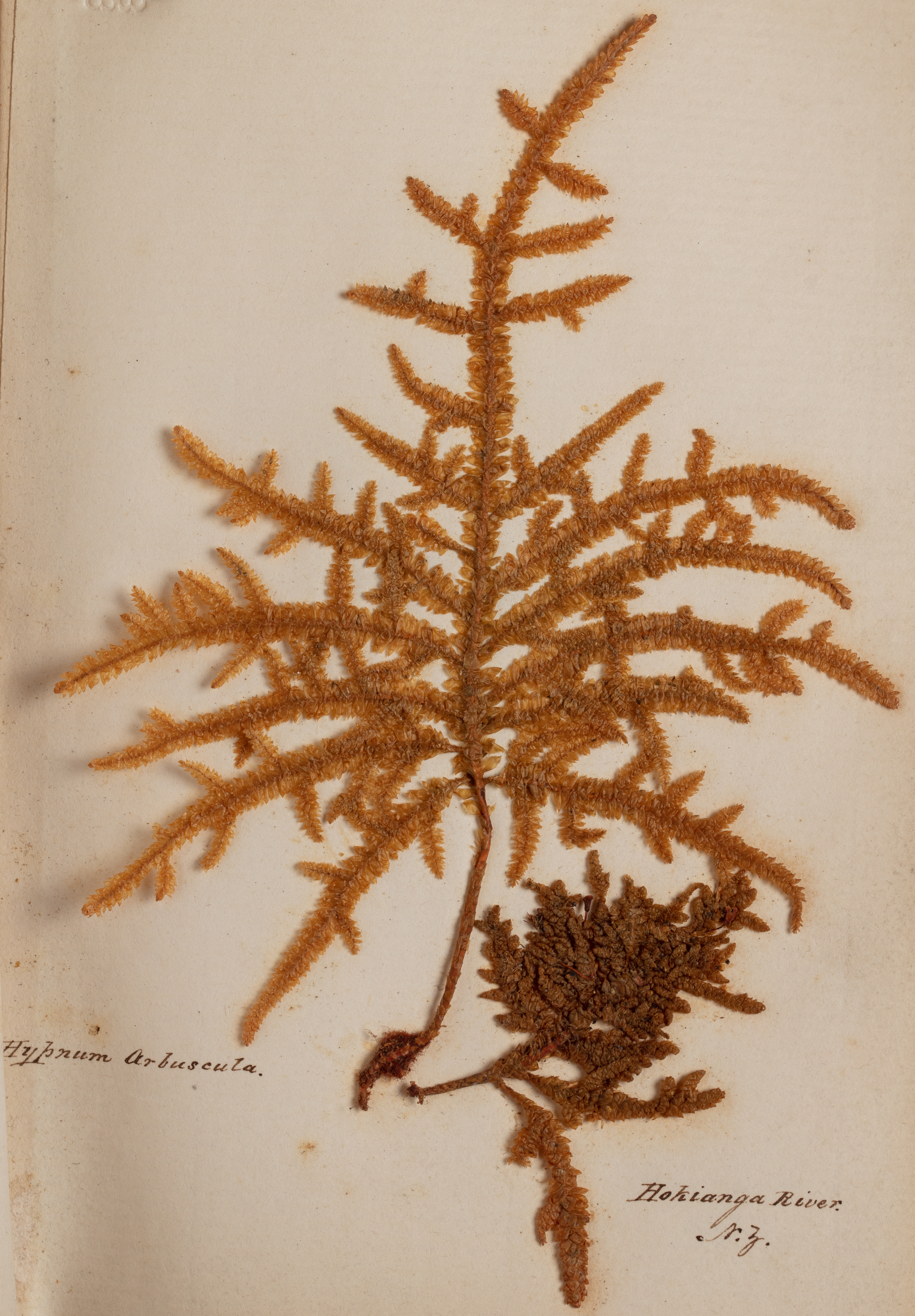
- Camptochaete deflexa

Scientific classification
- Kingdom: Plantae
- Division: Bryophyta
- Class: Bryopsida
- Subclass: Bryidae
- Order: Hypnales
- Family: Lembophyllaceae
- Genus: Camptochaete; Reichardt, 1870

Species
- See text

= Camptochaete =

Genus of mosses

Camptochaete is a genus of mosses found in Australasia. The genus was described in 1870 by Heinrich Wilhelm Reichardt (1835–1885). The name, from Greek kamptos, meaning bent, altered, and chaite, meaning hair, bristle, likely refers to the curved seta.

Species include:

- Camptochaete aciphylla Dixon & Sainsbury
- Camptochaete angustata (Mitt.) Reichardt
- Camptochaete arbuscula (Sm.) Reichardt
- Camptochaete curvata Tangney
- Camptochaete deflexa (Wilson) A.Jaeger
- Camptochaete excavata (Taylor) A.Jaeger
- Camptochaete leichhardtii (Hampe) Broth.
- Camptochaete monolina Meagher & Cairns
- Camptochaete pulvinata (Hook.f. & Wilson) A.Jaeger
- Camptochaete subporotrichoides (Broth. & Geh.) Broth. (Besch.)
