= William Weymouth =

Australian bryologist

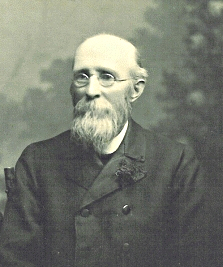
Photograph of the Tasmanian botanist William A. Weymouth, made by Crawford, 62 Murray Street, Hobart

William Anderson Weymouth (Launceston, Van Diemen's Land 24 March 1841 – Hobart, Tasmania, 24 May 1928) was an amateur botanist. He worked as an insurance assessor with the National Mutual Insurance Company. In 1887 he began collecting mosses and lichens, sending them to several European bryologists including Antonio Jatta in Italy, and Viktor Brotherus in Finland. Weymouth issued the exsiccata Musci Tasmaniae exsiccati (1907-1915). Jatta named a species of lichen in honour of Weymouth called Ochrolechia weymouthii, and Brotherus named the moss genus Weymouthia. Weymouth published several papers on mosses from Tasmania.

== Publications ==
He published a number of papers on Tasmanian bryophytes in 1893 and 1894–1895, including:

- Weymouth, William Anderson (1894) "Some Additions to the Moss Flora of Tasmania", Papers and Proceedings of the Royal Society of Tasmania
- Weymouth, William Anderson and Rodway, Leonard (1921) "Bryophyte notes", Papers and Proceedings of the Royal Society of Tasmania, pp. 173–175
