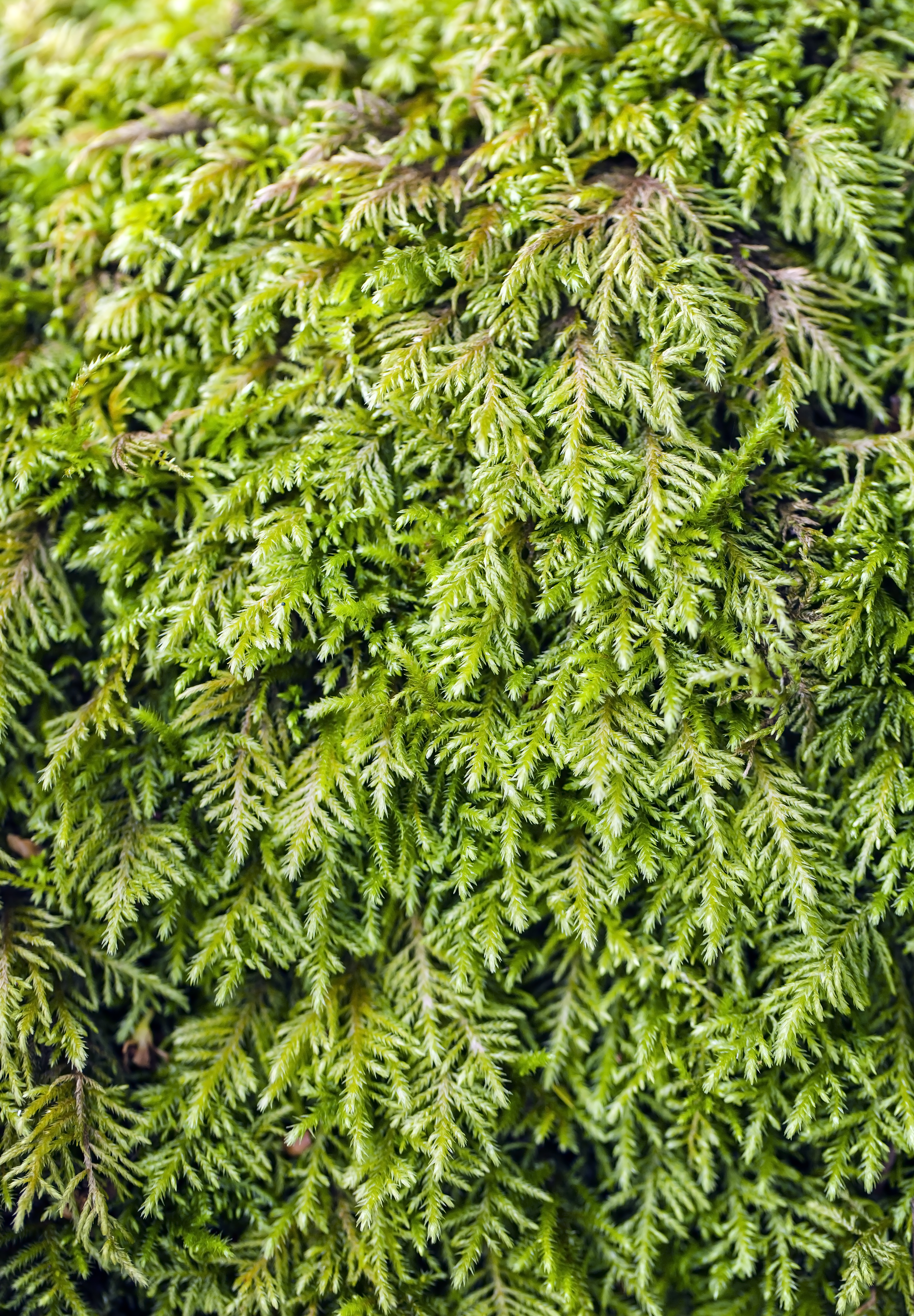
- Bestia longipes

Scientific classification
- Kingdom: Plantae
- Division: Bryophyta
- Class: Bryopsida
- Subclass: Bryidae
- Order: Hypnales
- Family: Lembophyllaceae
- Genus: Bestia; Broth.

= Bestia (plant) =

Genus of mosses

Bestia is a genus of mosses belonging to the family Lembophyllaceae.

The genus name of Bestia is in honour of George Newton Best (1846–1926), an American bryologist, expert on moss taxonomy, and the second president of the Sullivant Moss Society.

Species:

- Bestia breweriana (Lesq.) Grout
- Bestia cristata (Hampe) L.F. Koch
- Bestia holzingeri (Renauld & Cardot) Broth.
- Bestia longipes (Sull. & Lesq.) Broth.
- Bestia obtusatula (Kindb.) Broth.
- Bestia occidentalis (Kindb.) Grout
- Bestia vancouveriensis (Kindb.) Wijk & Margad.
