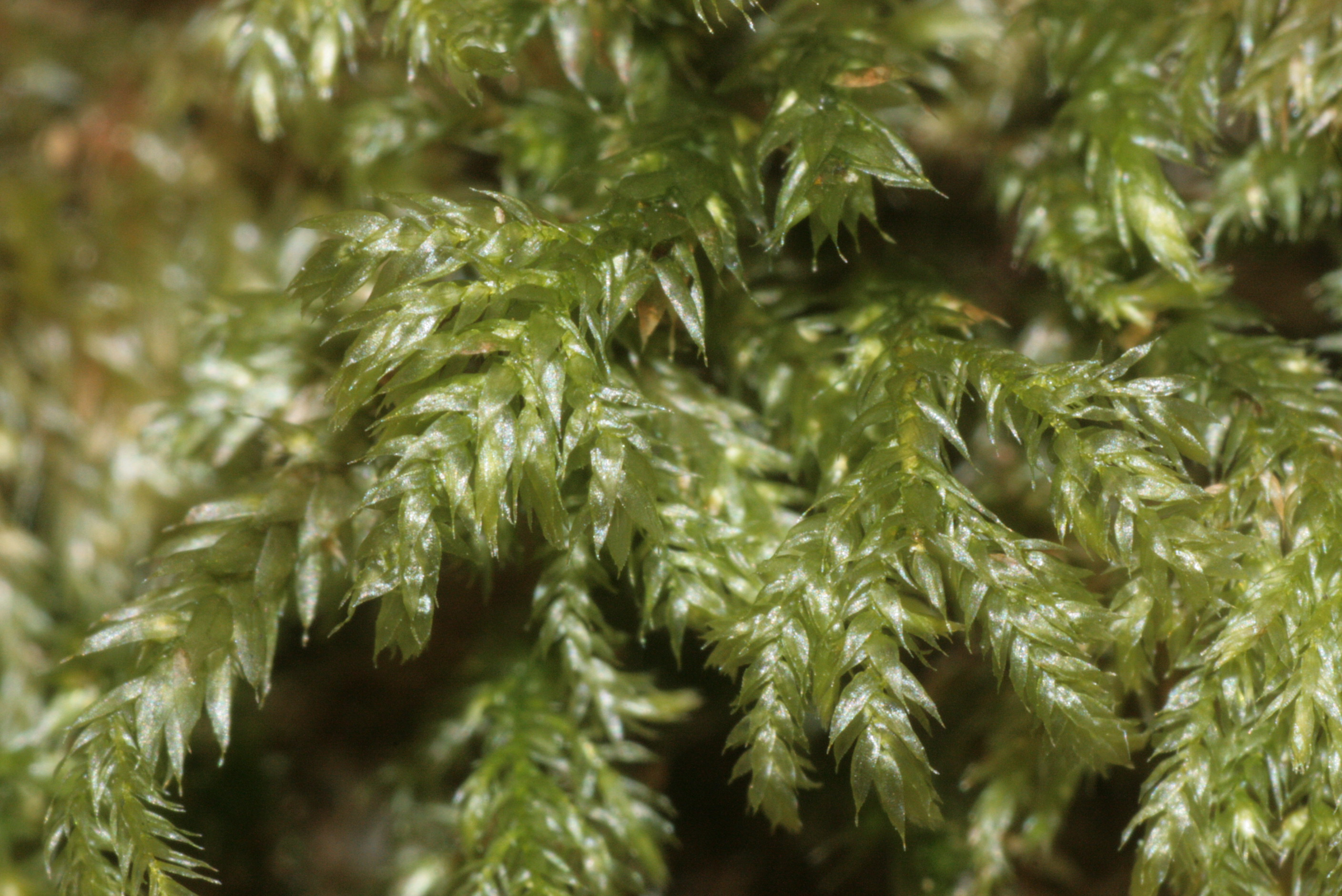

Scientific classification
- Kingdom: Plantae
- Division: Bryophyta
- Class: Bryopsida
- Subclass: Bryidae
- Order: Hypnales
- Family: Lembophyllaceae
- Genus: Isothecium
- Species: I. myosuroides

Binomial name
- Isothecium myosuroides Brid.

= Isothecium myosuroides =

Species of moss

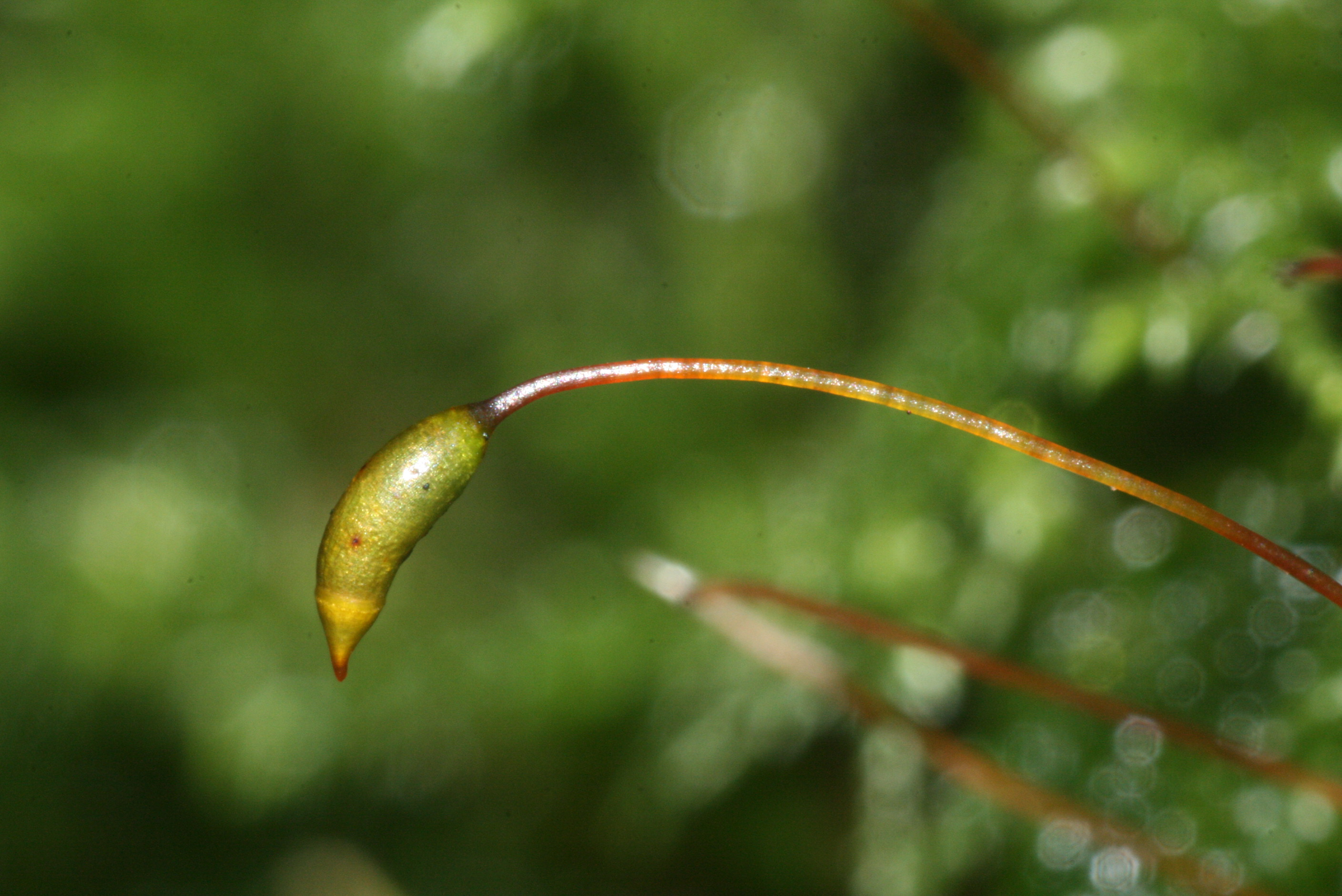
Isothecium myosuroides spore capsule

Isothecium myosuroides, commonly known as slender mouse-tail moss or tree moss, is a true moss that grows abundantly on both rocks and trees. It is native to Western and Eastern North America, as well as parts of Western Europe. It grows preferentially on angiosperms rather than on conifers because of the manner in which the former take in water creating an ideal moist habitat for the moss to grow on, and because many trees in the flowering plant families are less acidic than coniferous species of trees.
