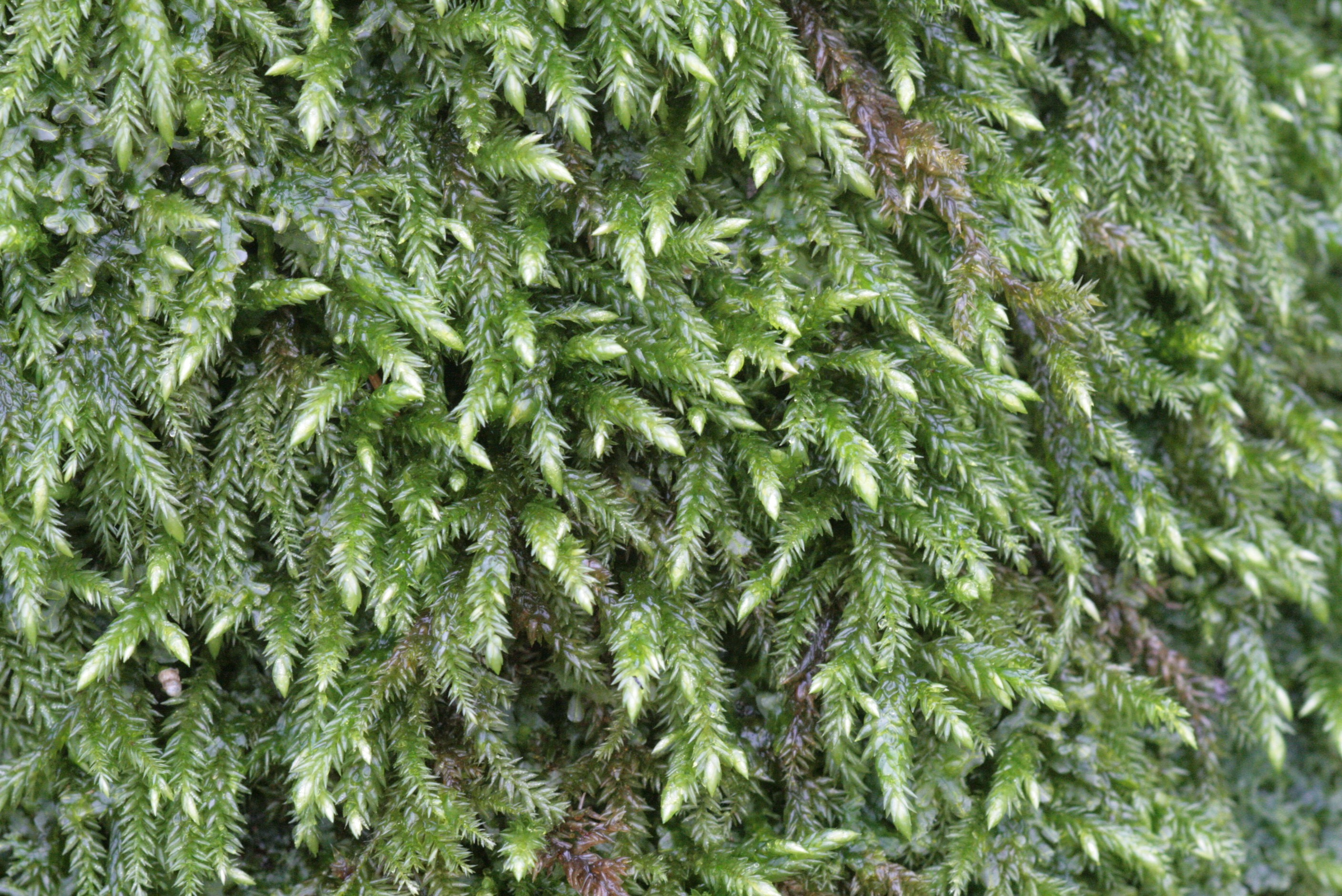
- Isothecium alopecuroides

Scientific classification
- Kingdom: Plantae
- Division: Bryophyta
- Class: Bryopsida
- Subclass: Bryidae
- Order: Hypnales
- Family: Lembophyllaceae
- Genus: Isothecium; Brid.

= Isothecium =

Genus of mosses

Isothecium is a genus of mosses belonging to the family Lembophyllaceae. The genus has a cosmopolitan distribution.

== Species ==
The following species are recognised in the genus Isothecium:

- Isothecium acuticuspis (Mitt.) Macoun & Kindb.
- Isothecium algarvicum W.E.Nicholson & Dixon
- Isothecium alopecuroides Isoviita
- Isothecium amoenum (Hedw.) Brid.
- Isothecium andrieuxii (Müll.Hal.) Mont.
- Isothecium angustatum (Mitt.) Hook.f.
- Isothecium arbuscula (Sm.) Brid.
- Isothecium beyrichii (Schwägr.) Mont.
- Isothecium bifarium (Hook.) Brid.
- Isothecium brachycladon Kindb.
- Isothecium brewerianum (Lesq.) Kindb.
- Isothecium buchananii Brid.
- Isothecium catenulatum (Brid. ex Schrad.) Huebener
- Isothecium ceylonense Fleischer
- Isothecium cochlearifolium (Schwägr.) Mitt.
- Isothecium comatum (Müll.Hal.) Hook. & Wilson
- Isothecium comosum (Labill.) Brid.
- Isothecium compressum (Hedw.) Hampe
- Isothecium crassiusculum (Brid.) Brid.
- Isothecium crispifolium (Hook.) Brid.
- Isothecium cristatum H.Robinson
- Isothecium cymbifolium Lindb.
- Isothecium flexile (Hedw.) Brid.
- Isothecium hakkodense Bescherelle, 1893
- Isothecium hexastichum (Schwägr.) Brid.
- Isothecium holtii Kindberg
- Isothecium holzingeri (Renauld & Cardot) Kindb.
- Isothecium howei Kindb.
- Isothecium imbricatum (P.Beauv.) Brid.
- Isothecium intortum (P.Beauv.) Brid.
- Isothecium intricatum (Hartm.) Boulay
- Isothecium julaceum (Schwägr.) Brid.
- Isothecium kenyae Tosco & Piovano
- Isothecium kerrii (Mitt.) Hook.f.
- Isothecium laxifolium (Hook.) Brid.
- Isothecium lentum (Mitt.) Kindb.
- Isothecium leptochaeton (Schwägr.) Brid.
- Isothecium livens (Schwägr.) Brid.
- Isothecium longicuspis Broth.
- Isothecium marocanum Thériot & Meylan
- Isothecium menziesii (Hook.) Brid.
- Isothecium mertensii Brotherus
- Isothecium molle (Hedw.) Mitt.
- Isothecium mutabile (Brid.) Spruce
- Isothecium myosuroides Bridel
- Isothecium myuroides Kindberg
- Isothecium neckeroides (Hook.) Brid.
- Isothecium nervosum W.R.Buck
- Isothecium nigricans (Hook.) Brid.
- Isothecium obtusatulum Kindberg, 1895
- Isothecium pallidum Brid.
- Isothecium patens (Hook.) Brid.
- Isothecium pendulum Brid.
- Isothecium pentastichum (Brid.) Brid.
- Isothecium philippeanum Spruce
- Isothecium physaophyllos (Welw. & Duby) A.Jaeger
- Isothecium polyanthum (Hedw.) Spruce
- Isothecium radiatum (Schwägr.) Brid.
- Isothecium radicans Brid.
- Isothecium repens (Brid.) Spruce
- Isothecium rigidissimum Fleischer
- Isothecium rufescens (Dicks. ex Brid.) Huebener
- Isothecium schleicheri Schimp.
- Isothecium semitortum Dixon
- Isothecium sericeum (Philibert) Boulay, 1884
- Isothecium spiculiferum (Mitt.) Macoun & Kindb.
- Isothecium sprucei Philippe
- Isothecium striatum (Schwägr.) Spruce
- Isothecium strictum (Lorentz) Boulay
- Isothecium subdiversiforme Brotherus
- Isothecium subglaciale Stirt.
- Isothecium subseriatum (Mitt. ex Sande Lac.) Lindb.
- Isothecium subsimplex (Hedw.) Brid.
- Isothecium tenerum (Sw.) Brid.
- Isothecium tetragonum (Sw. ex Hedw.) Brid.
- Isothecium thunbergii (Brid.) Brid.
- Isothecium trichocladon Fleischer
