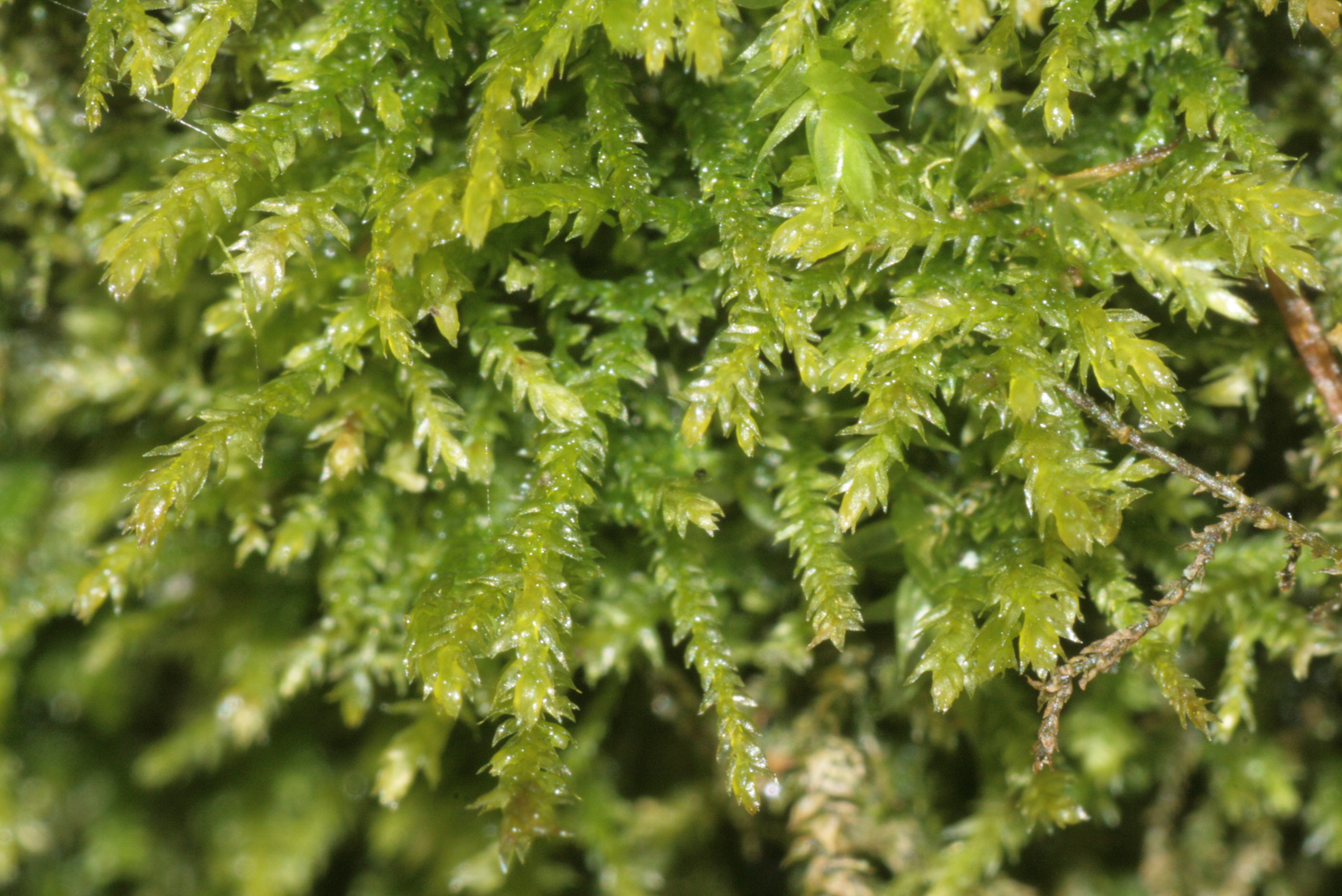
- Heterocladium heteropterum

Scientific classification
- Kingdom: Plantae
- Clade: Embryophytes
- Division: Bryophyta
- Class: Bryopsida
- Subclass: Bryidae
- Order: Hypnales
- Family: Lembophyllaceae
- Genus: Heterocladium; Bruch & Schimp.

= Heterocladium =

Genus of mosses

Heterocladium is a genus of mosses belonging to the family Thuidiaceae.

The species of this genus are found in Eurasia and America.

== Species ==
As accepted by GBIF;

- Heterocladium angustifolium Watanabe, 1960
- Heterocladium austroalpinum (Müll.Hal.) Broth.
- Heterocladium capillaceum Broth. ex Iisiba
- Heterocladium capillaceum Brotherus ex Iishiba, 1929
- Heterocladium dimorphum W.P.Schimper, 1852
- Heterocladium flaccidum (Schimp.) A.J.E.Sm.
- Heterocladium frullaniopsis Müll.Hal. & Kindb.
- Heterocladium gastrodes (Welw. & Duby) A.Jaeger
- Heterocladium heteropterum W.P.Schimper, 1852
- Heterocladium homoeopterum Müll.Hal. & Kindb.
- Heterocladium implexum (Kunze ex Schwägr.) Lorentz
- Heterocladium leucotrichum Mitt.
- Heterocladium macounii Best, 1901
- Heterocladium pilicuspis Broth. ex Iisiba
- Heterocladium pilicuspis Brotherus ex Iishiba, 1929
- Heterocladium procurrens Jaeger, 1878
- Heterocladium prolixum Schimp.
- Heterocladium subintegrum Mitt.
- Heterocladium tenellum Deguchi & H.Suzuki, 1974
- Heterocladium tenue Mitt.
- Heterocladium vancouveriense (Kindb.) Kindb.
- Heterocladium wulfsbergii I.Hagen, 1909
