= Rosemont, Hunterdon County, New Jersey =

Place in Hunterdon County, New Jersey, United States

Rosemont, New Jersey
- Unincorporated community
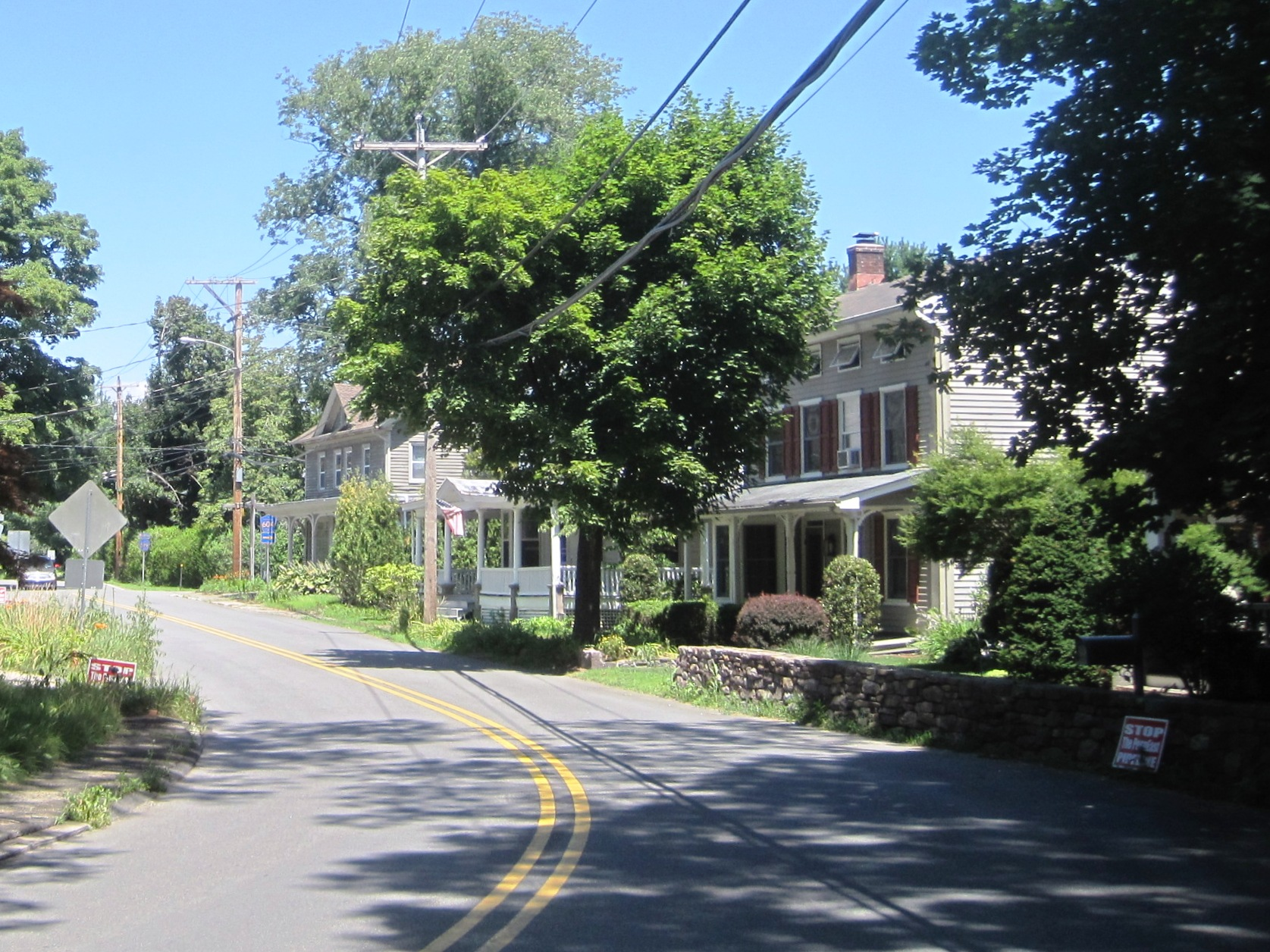
- Center of Rosemont

- Location of Rosemont in Hunterdon County Inset: Location of county within the state of New Jersey Rosemont, New Jersey (New Jersey) Rosemont, New Jersey (the United States)
- Coordinates: 40°25′38″N 74°59′24″W
- Country: United States
- State: New Jersey
- County: Hunterdon
- Township: Delaware
- Elevation: 315 ft (96 m)
- ZIP code: 08556
- Area code: 908
- GNIS feature ID: 879825

- Rosemont Rural Agricultural District
- U.S. National Register of Historic Places
- U.S. Historic district
- NRHP reference No.: 10000354
- Added to NRHP: June 18, 2010

Rosemont is an unincorporated community located within Delaware Township in Hunterdon County, in the U.S. state of New Jersey. Its ZIP code is 08556. Situated at the top of a small hill, the center of the community lies along Kingwood Stockton Road (County Route 519), near its intersections with Raven Rock Rosemont Road and Rosemont Ringoes Road (CR 604). The surrounding area consists of farmland (which is listed on the National Register of Historic Places) and residential properties. The center of the settlement features residences, a post office, and an antique shop.

== Notable people ==
People who were born in, residents of, or otherwise closely associated with Rosemont include:

- Willard H. Allen (1893–1957), poultry scientist who served as New Jersey secretary of agriculture from 1938 to 1956.
- George Newton Best (1846–1926), bryologist, expert on moss taxonomy and second president of the Sullivant Moss Society.
- Lloyd Wescott (1907–1990), agriculturalist, civil servant and philanthropist
- Paul Whiteman (1890–1967), bandleader, composer, orchestral director and violinist
