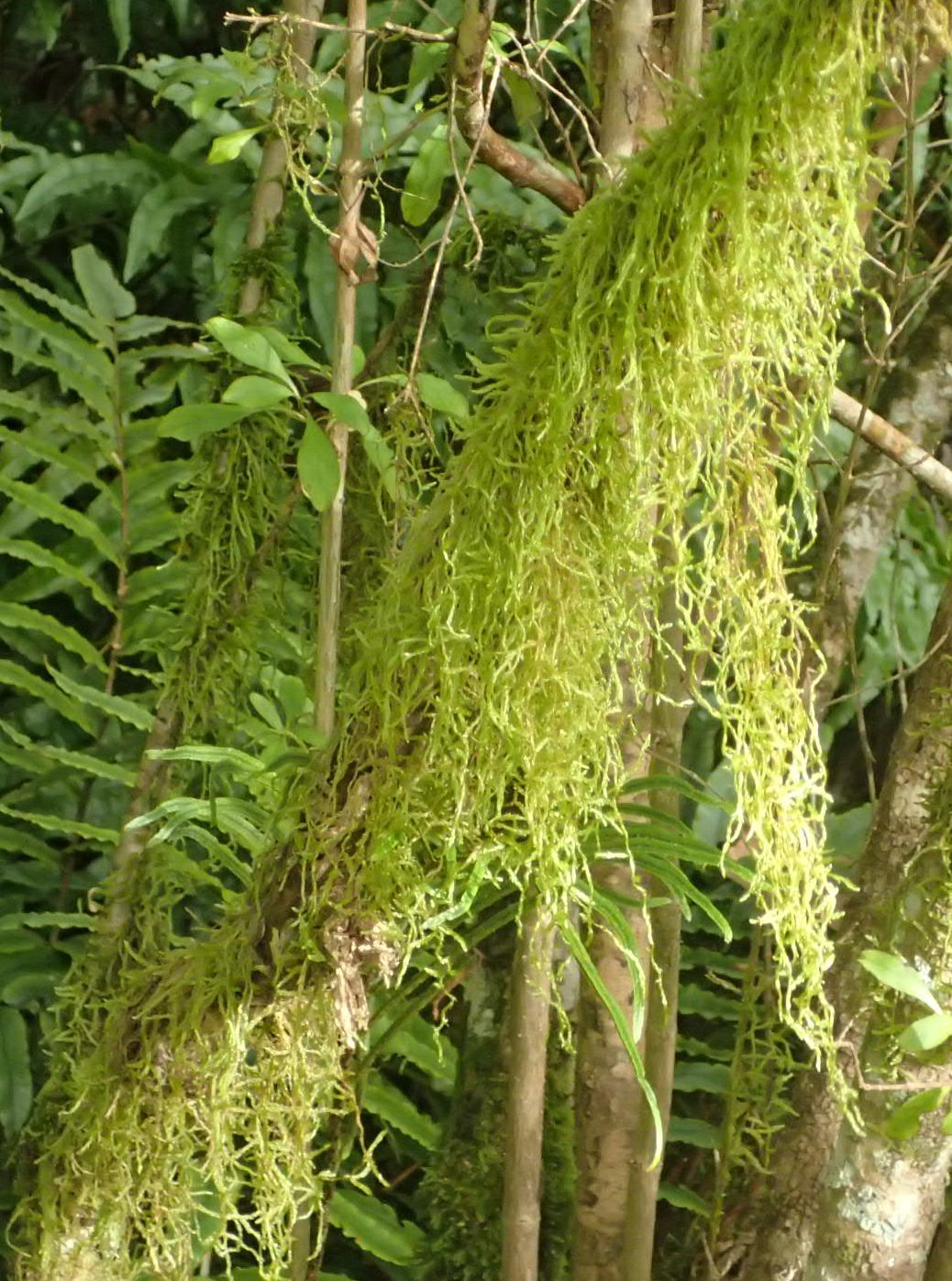
- Weymouthia mollis

Scientific classification
- Kingdom: Plantae
- Division: Bryophyta
- Class: Bryopsida
- Subclass: Bryidae
- Order: Hypnales
- Family: Lembophyllaceae
- Genus: Weymouthia; Broth. in H.G.A. Engler & K.A.E. Prantl, 1906

Species
- W. mollis (Hedw., 1801) (Type) synonyms Isothecium molle, Leskea mollis, Meteorium molle, Neckera mollis, Pilotrichella mollis, P. weymouthii, Stereodon mollis; W. cochlearifolia (Schwägr., 1816) synonyms W. billardierei, W. cochlearifolia var. billardierei, Coelidium cochlearifolium, Hypnum cochlearifolium, Isothecium cochlearifolium, Lembophyllum cochlearifolium, Neckera billardierei, Porotrichum cochlearifolium, Pilotrichella billardierei, Stereodon cochlearifolius

= Weymouthia (plant) =

Genus of mosses

Weymouthia is a genus of two species belonging to the feather mosses. Weymouthia occurs in southern South America, New Zealand and south-eastern Australia and Lord Howe Island. It is characterised by (i) its monopodial, often hanging growth form; (ii) slight differences between stem and branch leaves; and (iii) the straight perichaetial leaves. In contrast to other genera in the Lembophyllaceae, secondary stems appear unable to arch back to the substrate and then root and form a new creeping stem.

== Etymology ==
Weymouthia was named in honour of William Anderson Weymouth (1842–1932), a prominent Tasmanian botanist. The species epithet mollis meaning soft, flabby, weak or feeble in Latin, refers to the exclusively hanging branches in this species. The species epithet cochlearifolia refers to the spoon-shaped leaves that resemble those of scurvy-grass.

== Taxonomy ==
Weymouthia has traditionally been assigned to the Meteoriaceae, mainly because of the hanging branches. Later the genus was included in the Lembophyllaceae, but according to recent cladistic analyses based on DNA, this family is polyphyletic, and its revision is to be expected.

== Key to the species ==
1	Leaves oblong, more than twice as long as wide; upper laminal cells not or shallowly pitted. → Weymouthia mollis
-	Leaves broadly ovate, less than twice as long as wide; upper laminal cells strongly pitted. → Weymouthia cochlearifolia

== Links to photos ==
- Weymouthia mollis
- Weymouthia cochlearifolia
