= Riegelsville, Pennsylvania =

Borough in Pennsylvania, US

- Borough
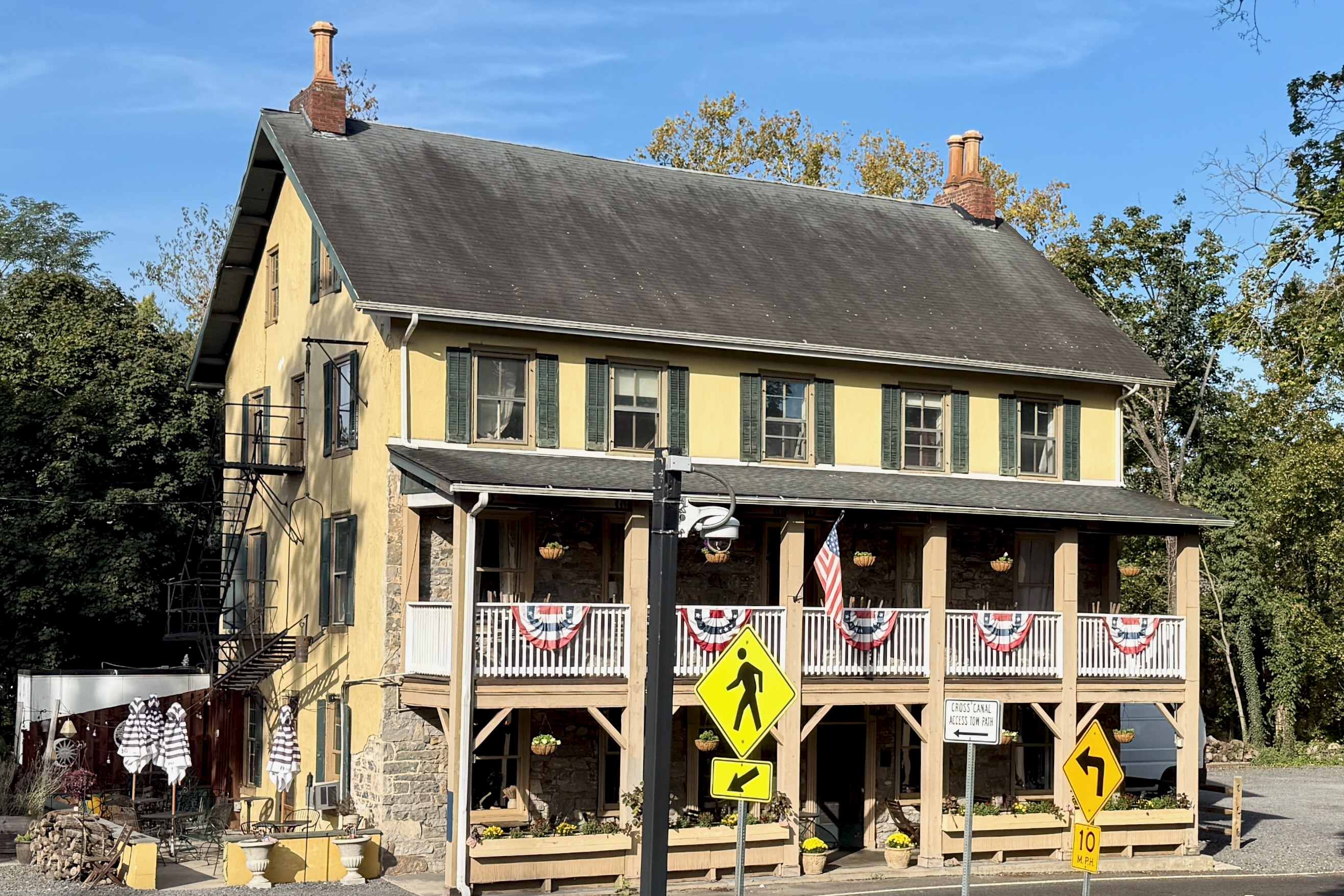
- Historic Riegelsville Inn

- Location in Bucks County, Pennsylvania

- Location in Pennsylvania Location in the United States
- Coordinates: 40°35′44″N 75°11′44″W
- Country: United States
- State: Pennsylvania
- County: Bucks

Government
  - Mayor: Viana Boenzli

Area
  - Total: 1.08 sq mi (2.79 km^{2})
  - Land: 1.01 sq mi (2.61 km^{2})
  - Water: 0.073 sq mi (0.19 km^{2})
- Elevation: 151 ft (46 m)

Population (2020)
  - Total: 847
  - Density: 841.3/sq mi (324.82/km^{2})
- Time zone: UTC-5 (Eastern (EST))
  - Summer (DST): UTC-4 (EDT)
- ZIP Code: 18077
- Area code: 610
- FIPS code: 42-64856
- Website: www.riegelsville.org

Riegelsville is a borough in Bucks County, Pennsylvania, United States. As of the 2020 census, Riegelsville had a population of 847. It is included in the Philadelphia metropolitan area, despite being so closely connected to the Lehigh Valley.

== History ==
A black and white photograph of Riegelsville Inn, built in 1838

Benjamin Riegel founded Riegelsville. The original, and now historic, Riegelsville Inn that he built in 1838 still stands. This historic stone inn has offered food and lodging to Bucks County travelers for over 160 years. The community was named for the Riegel family, as early landowners. They established paper mills across the Delaware River in Warren County, New Jersey.

With the completion of the Delaware Canal in 1832, the lands along the Delaware River attracted great industrial development. The movement of coal, a major important product of the area, brought capital & investment to Easton. Boats carried coal, stone, iron, crops, and goods from the mills along the 60 miles from Easton to Bristol. Along Canal Street grew one of the largest industrial manufacturing centers of America during the 1830s and 1840s. Easton continued to prosper as a center for industry, manufacturing, commerce, and culture at the Forks of Delaware and along the great rail lines. Between 1904 and 1926, Riegelsville was served by electric passenger and freight trolleys of the Doylestown & Easton Street Railway Company. Riegelsville prospered when the Delaware Canal opened in 1832 with warehouses and factories lining its banks. The canal closed in 1931 after 99 years of service and was replaced by the railroads. Today, Riegelsville is a peaceful and quiet town. Woods and fields border the Delaware Canal; remnants of crumbling stone foundations along its banks are reminders of a busy past.

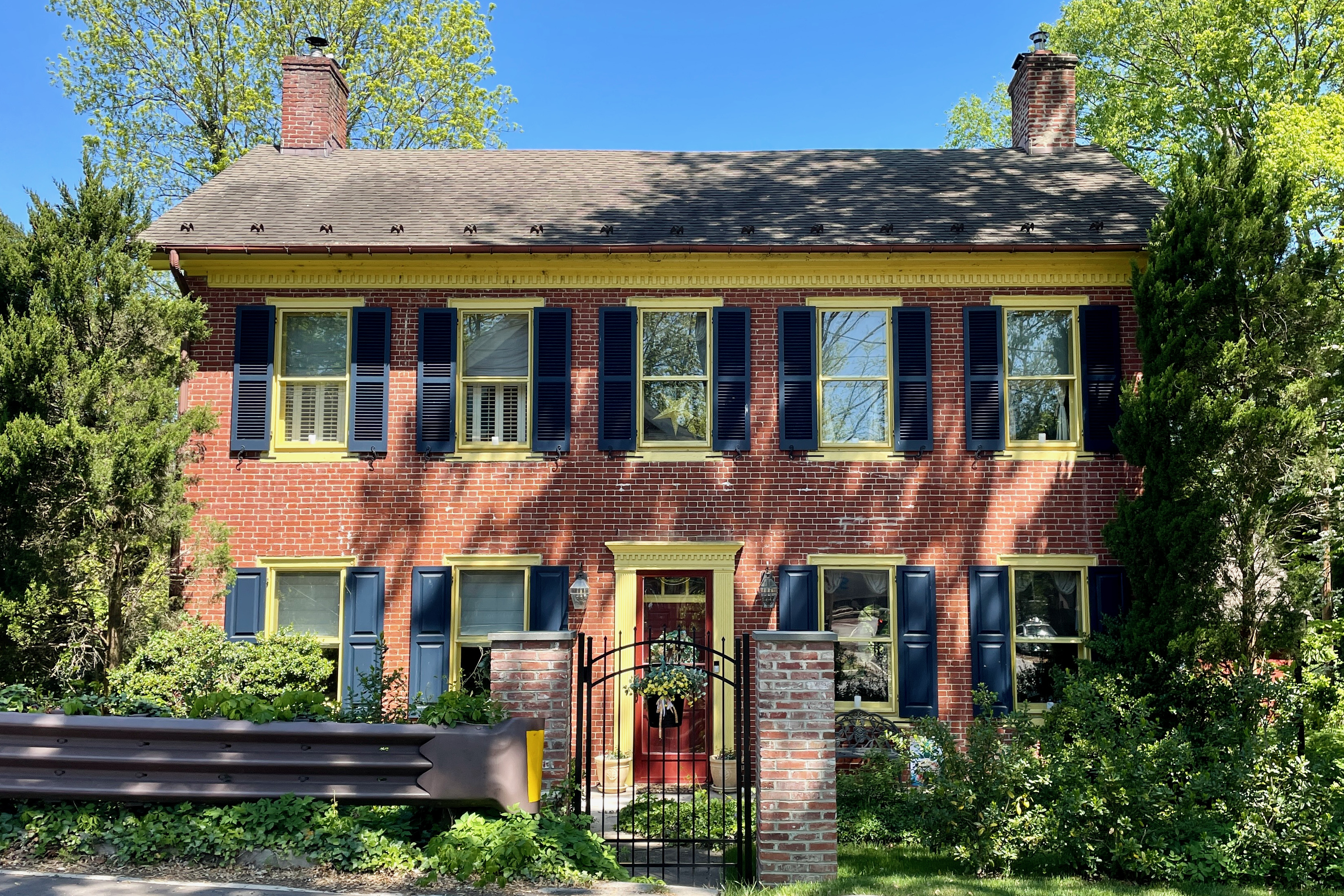
Benjamin Riegel House was added to the National Register of Historic Places in 1987

Riegelsville was a mill town in the late 1880s and 1900s. The borough overlooks the Delaware River, spanned by the Riegelsville Bridge, built in 1904 by John A. Roebling's Sons, Co. and connecting with Riegelsville, New Jersey. It is one of the approximately three dozen bridges spanning the Delaware River between Pennsylvania and New Jersey.

Residences near the river built by Riegel Paper Company executives in the late 1880s along "Mansions Row" have been restored.

The Benjamin Riegel House was added to the National Register of Historic Places in 1987.

== Geography ==
According to the U.S. Census Bureau, the borough has a total area of 1.0 square mile (2.6 km^{2}), of which 1.0 square mile (2.6 km^{2}) is land and 0.1 square miles (0.26 km^{2}) (5.71%) is water.

=== Neighboring municipalities ===
- Durham Township (west and south)
- Holland Township, New Jersey (southeast)
- Pohatcong Township, New Jersey (northeast)
- Williams Township, Northampton County (north)

== Demographics ==
Historical population
Census	Pop.	Note	%±
1880	308		—
1920	610		—
1930	725		18.9%
1940	824		13.7%
1950	871		5.7%
1960	953		9.4%
1970	1,050		10.2%
1980	993		−5.4%
1990	912		−8.2%
2000	863		−5.4%
2010	868		0.6%
2020	847		−2.4%

At the 2010 census, the borough was 96.8% White, 0.2% Black or African American, 0.3% Native American, 0.2% Asian and 0.5% were two or more races. 2.0% of the population were of Hispanic or Latino ancestry.

At the 2000 census, there were 863 people, 378 households and 250 families residing in the borough. The population density was 867.8 per square mile (335.1/km^{2}). There were 403 housing units at an average density of 405.3 per square mile (156.5/km^{2}). The racial make-up of the borough was 99.19% White, 0.12% African American, 0.23% Asian, 0.35% from other races and 0.12% from two or more races. Hispanic or Latino of any race were 0.58% of the population.

There were 378 households, of which 26.5% had children under the age of 18 living with them, 51.6% were married couples living together, 10.1% had a female householder with no husband present and 33.6% were non-families. 28.3% of all households were made up of individuals, and 12.2% had someone living alone who was 65 years of age or older. The average household size was 2.28 and the average family size was 2.77.

21.3% of the population were under the age of 18, 5.2% from 18 to 24, 32.9% from 25 to 44, 25.0% from 45 to 64 and 15.5% who were 65 years of age or older. The median age was 40 years. For every 100 females, there were 100.2 males. For every 100 females age 18 and over, there were 93.4 males.

The median household income was $48,194 and the median family income was $55,208. Males had a median income of $41,250 and females $31,726. The per capita income was $24,916. About 2.0% of families and 3.3% of the population were below the poverty line, including 1.2% of those under age 18 and 6.7% of those age 65 or over.

== Education ==
Formerly located in the Easton Area School District, Riegelsville is now in the Palisades School District.

Circa 2006 a campaign to move Riegelsville from the Easton Area School District to the Palisades School District began. In 2011, Ronald J. Tomalis, the Secretary of Education of Pennsylvania, ruled in favor of the Riegelsville Tax and Education Coalition by stating that the group's request is related to education quality. The previous secretary had ruled against the group. Clyde Waite, a judge in Bucks County approved the plan in 2012. Riegelsville was to be an independent school district for a period between it being part of two different school districts. Pennsylvania State Board of Education approved the moving of districts in July 2012. The change was to be effective in 2013. Around 60 students were to be moved to the Palisades district. To cover the student transfer, the Palisades district gave $1,400,000 to the Easton Area school district.

== Weather and climate ==
According to the Köppen climate classification system, Riegelsville has a Hot-summer, Humid continental climate (Dfa). Dfa climates are characterized by at least one month having an average mean temperature ≤ 32.0 °F (0.0 °C), at least four months with an average mean temperature ≥ 50.0 °F (10.0 °C), at least one month with an average mean temperature ≥ 71.6 °F (22.0 °C) and no significant precipitation difference between seasons. Although most summer days are slightly humid in Riegelsville, episodes of heat and high humidity can occur with heat index values > 105 °F (41 °C). Since 1981, the highest air temperature was 102.2 °F (39.0 °C) on July 22, 2011, and the highest daily average mean dew point was 73.8 °F (23.2 °C) on August 1, 2006. The average wettest month is July, which corresponds with the annual peak in thunderstorm activity. Since 1981, the wettest calendar day was 6.56 inches (167 mm) on August 27, 2011. During the winter months, the average annual extreme minimum air temperature is −1.4 °F (−18.6 °C). Since 1981, the coldest air temperature was −13.4 °F (−25.2 °C) on January 21, 1994. Episodes of extreme cold and wind can occur, with wind chill values < −12 °F (−24 °C). The average annual snowfall (Nov-Apr) is between 30 inches (76 cm) and 36 inches (91 cm). Ice storms and large snowstorms depositing ≥ 12 inches (30 cm) of snow occur once every few years, particularly during nor’easters from December through February.

Climate data for Riegelsville, Elevation 171 ft (52 m), 1981–2010 normals, extremes 1981–2018
Month	Jan	Feb	Mar	Apr	May	Jun	Jul	Aug	Sep	Oct	Nov	Dec	Year
Record high °F (°C)	70.2 (21.2)	78.4 (25.8)	87.7 (30.9)	94.2 (34.6)	94.5 (34.7)	95.5 (35.3)	102.2 (39.0)	99.7 (37.6)	96.9 (36.1)	89.8 (32.1)	80.6 (27.0)	73.9 (23.3)	102.2 (39.0)
Mean daily maximum °F (°C)	37.9 (3.3)	41.6 (5.3)	50.4 (10.2)	62.8 (17.1)	72.7 (22.6)	81.3 (27.4)	85.3 (29.6)	83.3 (28.5)	76.7 (24.8)	65.0 (18.3)	54.3 (12.4)	42.5 (5.8)	62.9 (17.2)
Daily mean °F (°C)	29.4 (−1.4)	32.2 (0.1)	40.0 (4.4)	51.1 (10.6)	60.9 (16.1)	70.0 (21.1)	74.6 (23.7)	72.7 (22.6)	65.4 (18.6)	53.8 (12.1)	44.3 (6.8)	34.2 (1.2)	52.5 (11.4)
Mean daily minimum °F (°C)	20.8 (−6.2)	22.8 (−5.1)	29.6 (−1.3)	39.4 (4.1)	49.1 (9.5)	58.8 (14.9)	63.9 (17.7)	62.0 (16.7)	54.2 (12.3)	42.5 (5.8)	34.3 (1.3)	25.9 (−3.4)	42.0 (5.6)
Record low °F (°C)	−13.4 (−25.2)	−5.8 (−21.0)	1.2 (−17.1)	16.5 (−8.6)	31.8 (−0.1)	39.9 (4.4)	45.6 (7.6)	40.4 (4.7)	34.1 (1.2)	22.7 (−5.2)	9.1 (−12.7)	−2.7 (−19.3)	−13.4 (−25.2)
Average precipitation inches (mm)	3.32 (84)	2.79 (71)	3.56 (90)	4.02 (102)	4.30 (109)	4.33 (110)	5.03 (128)	4.09 (104)	4.56 (116)	4.40 (112)	3.64 (92)	3.98 (101)	48.02 (1,220)
Average relative humidity (%)	67.9	63.5	58.9	57.5	62.2	67.4	67.7	70.6	71.6	70.4	68.3	68.7	66.3
Average dew point °F (°C)	20.1 (−6.6)	21.2 (−6.0)	26.8 (−2.9)	36.6 (2.6)	47.9 (8.8)	58.7 (14.8)	63.2 (17.3)	62.6 (17.0)	56.0 (13.3)	44.4 (6.9)	34.5 (1.4)	25.0 (−3.9)	41.5 (5.3)
Source: PRISM

== Transportation ==
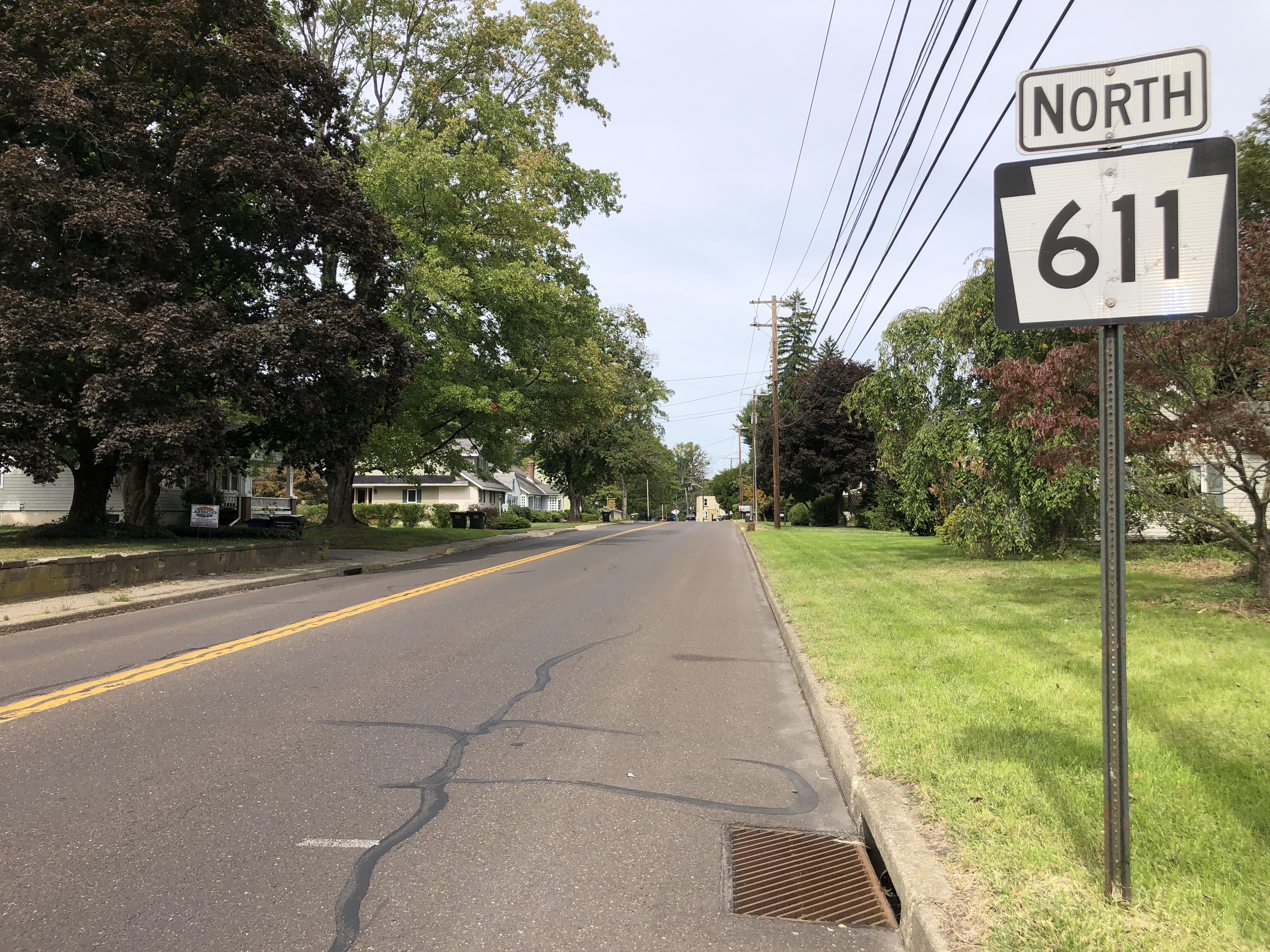
PA 611 northbound in Riegelsville

As of 2005 there were 6.96 miles (11.20 km) of public roads in Riegelsville, of which 1.74 miles (2.80 km) were maintained by the Pennsylvania Department of Transportation (PennDOT) and 5.22 miles (8.40 km) were maintained by the borough.

Pennsylvania Route 611 is the only numbered highway serving Riegelsville. It traverses the central portion of the borough on a north-south alignment via Easton Road.

== Ecology ==
According to the A. W. Kuchler U.S. potential natural vegetation types, Riegelsville has a dominant vegetation type of Appalachian Oak (104) with a dominant vegetation form of Eastern Hardwood Forest (25). The plant hardiness zone is 6b with an average annual extreme minimum air temperature of −1.4 °F (−18.6 °C). The spring bloom typically begins by April 12 and fall color usually peaks by October 28.
