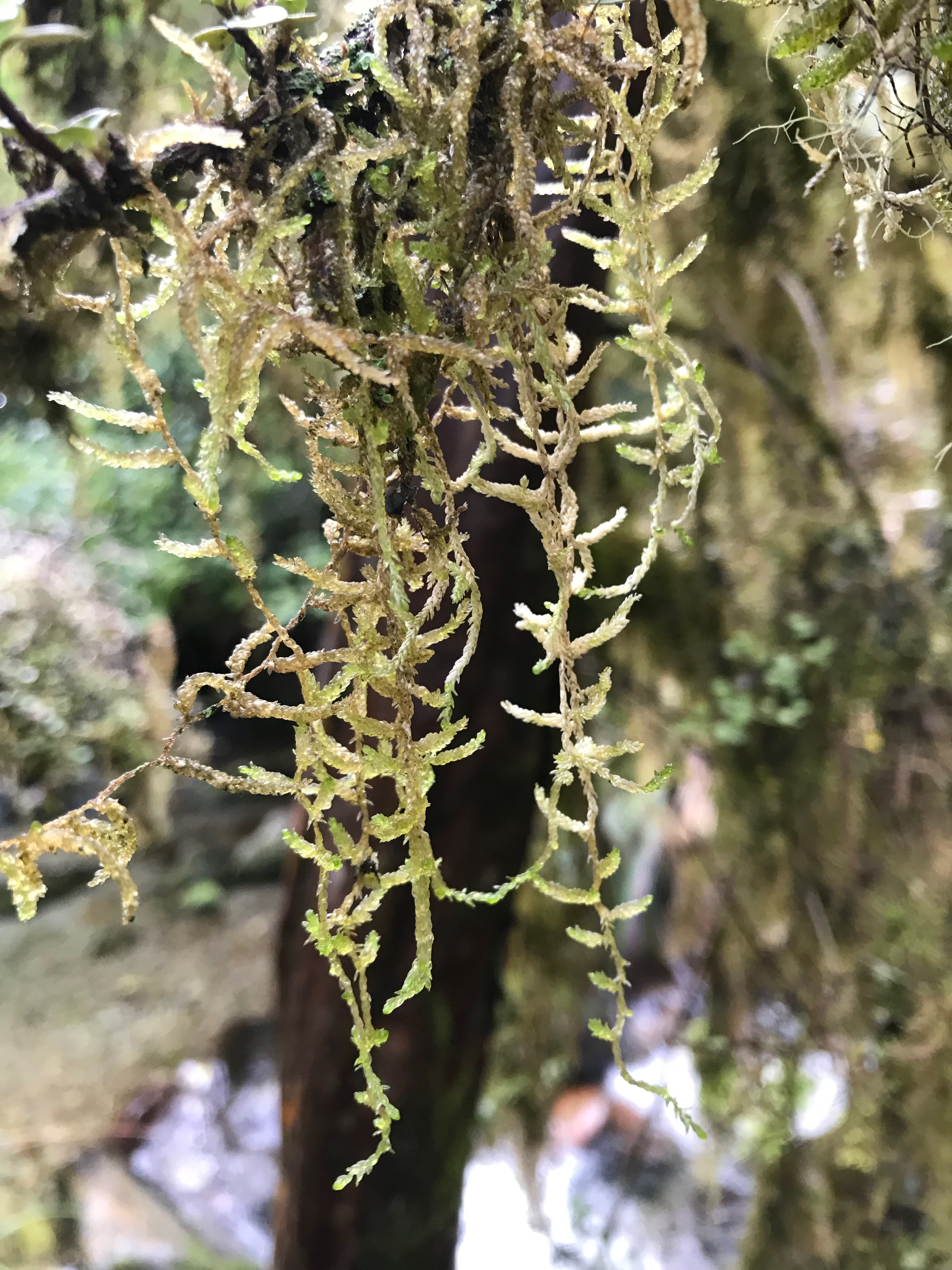
- Weymouthia mollis

Scientific classification
- Kingdom: Plantae
- Clade: Embryophytes
- Division: Bryophyta
- Class: Bryopsida
- Subclass: Bryidae
- Order: Hypnales
- Family: Lembophyllaceae; Broth.

Genera
- See text

= Lembophyllaceae =

Family of mosses

Lembophyllaceae is a family of pleurocarpous mosses in the order Hypnales. It was originally described by Finnish botanist Viktor Ferdinand Brotherus (1849–1929) in 1909. The family is mainly found in Australasia and southern South America.

== Taxonomy ==
Lembophyllaceae is closely related to the family Neckeraceae. Members of Lembophyllaceae are differentiated from Neckeraceae by their typically terete shoots (vs. mostly complanate), the leaves being mostly often loosely appressed, and frequently well-developed peristomes (vs. reduced or 'neckeroid' periostomes).

Genera include:

- Bestia Broth. – western North America
- Bryolawtonia D.H.Norris & Enroth
- Camptochaete Reichardt – Australasia
- Dolichomitra Broth. – Southeast Asia
- Dolichomitriadelphus Ignatova, Fedosov & Ignatov
- Dolichomitriopsis S.Okamura – Southeast Asia
- Fallaciella H.A.Crum – Australasia, southern South America
- Fifea H.A.Crum – Australasia
- Heterocladium Schimp.
- Isotheciastrum Ignatova, Fedosov & Ignatov
- Isothecium Brid. – widespread in the northern hemisphere (e.g. Isothecium myosuroides)
- Lembophyllum Lindb. – Australasia, southern South America
- Looseria (Thér.) D.Quandt, Huttunen, Tangney & M.Stech – southern South America
- Margrethypnum J.T.Wynns
- Mawenzhangia Enroth, Shevock & Ignatov
- Neobarbella Nog. – Southeast Asia
- Nogopterium Crosby & W.R.Buck
- Pilotrichella (Müll.Hal.) Lorentz – Hawaii, tropical Americas, Africa, Madagascar
- Pseudisothecium Grout
- Rigodium Kunze ex Schwägr. – Central and South America, East Africa, Madagascar
- Tripterocladium (Müll.Hal.) A.Jaeger – western North America
- Weymouthia Broth. – Australasia, southern South America

=== Formerly included ===
- Antitrichia Bridel-Brederi – now in Antitrichiaceae
