= Albert LeRoy Andrews =

American academic (1878–1961)

A. LeRoy Andrews
- Born: December 27, 1878; Williamstown, Massachusetts, U.S.
- Died: November 1, 1961 (aged 82); Ithaca, New York, U.S.
- Education: Williams College; Harvard University; University of Kiel
- Known for: The Bryophyte Flora of the Upper Cayuga Lake Basin, New York (1957)
- Scientific career
- Fields: Germanic philology Bryology
- Workplaces: Cornell University
- Author abbrev. (botany): A.L.Andrews

Albert LeRoy Andrews (1878–1961) was a professor of Germanic philology and an avocational bryologist, known as "one of the world’s foremost bryologists and the American authority on Sphagnaceae." From 1922 to 1923 he was the president of the Sullivant Moss Society, renamed in 1970 the American Bryological and Lichenological Society.

== Education and career ==
After graduating from secondary school in Williamstown, Andrews matriculated at Williams College. There he was a member of varsity teams in baseball and American football and in 1899 received a bachelor's degree with a major in languages, although he was extremely interested in botany. At Williams College, he published a list of mosses and hepatics of the northwest corner of Massachusetts in the Mount Greylock region. He taught non-English languages in Vermont from 1899 to 1901 at a preparatory school and in Mount Pleasant, Pennsylvania from 1901 to 1902 at a preparatory school, where he was also the assistant principal. In 1902 he received a master's degree from Williams College for work done in absentia. At Harvard University he was a graduate student from 1902 to 1903 and became interested in the philology of the Germanic languages and how they are related to other Indo-European languages. After graduating in 1903 from Harvard with his M.A. degree, Andrews was an instructor in German from 1903 to 1904 at the University of West Virginia and from 1904 to 1905 at Dartmouth College. He then went to Europe and studied from 1905 to 1908 at universities in Berlin, Kiel, Copenhagen, and Oslo and received his doctorate in 1908 from the University of Kiel.

At Cornell University, Andrews arrived in 1908 as a teaching fellow in German, was appointed in 1909 an instructor in German and Scandinavian, in 1918 an assistant professor of German, and in 1931 a professor of Germanic philology, retiring as professor emeritus in 1946. He was chair of Cornell's German department from 1924 to 1928. From his arrival at Cornell in 1908, he made contacts in the botany department and started conducting field trips for students who wanted to study the nearby moss flora. Even after his formal retirement in 1946 he continued leading field trips (until May 1961) and adding to his extensive personal collection of bryophytes. In 1953 he was appointed honorary curator of the Wiegand Herbarium's bryophyte collection. Upon his death, his personal collection of over 50,000 mosses and hepatics was given to the Wiegand Herbarium, which is now part of Cornell's L. H. Bailey Hortorium. His botanical correspondents include Liberty Hyde Bailey, John Hendley Barnhart, Hugo Leander Blomquist, Elizabeth Gertrude Britton, Nathaniel Lord Britton, Henry Shoemaker Conard, Howard Alvin Crum, Elias Durand, Alexander William Evans, William Gilson Farlow, Roxana Stinchfield Ferris, Abel Joel Grout, Olaf Hagerup, Elva Lawton, Leopold Loeske, William Ralph Maxon, Charles Frederick Millspaugh, Conrad Vernon Morton, Philip A. Munz, Harold Norman Moldenke, Geneva Sayre, Aaron John Sharp, Alexander Skutch, William Campbell Steere, Roland Thaxter, Carl Friedrich Warnstorf, Winona H. Welch, and many others.

Andrews collected bryophytes not only in North America, but also in Greenland, Iceland, Sweden, and the UK. He was from 1938 to 1949 an associate editor for The Bryologist.

His treatise on The Bryophyte Flora of the Upper Cayuga Lake Basin, New York (Cornell Univ. Agr. Exper. Sta. Memoir 352, publ. Dec. 1957) has become a classic.

He wrote the section Family 1. Sphagnaceae in part 1, volume 15 (1913) of the multi-volume series North American Flora published by the New York Botanical Garden.

The bryologist Laura Briscoe wrote in 2010:

Any student of Sphagnum is familiar with the existing North American treatments of the genus. There are only three complete floras of the genus in North America (Andrews 1913; Crum 1984; Warnstorf 1911) and several regional moss floras that treat Sphagnum.

Andrews contributed definitive treatments of the families Bryaceae and Mniaceae (both in volume 2) for the 3-volume work Moss Flora of North America North of Mexico edited by Abel Joel Grout.

As a philologist Andrews contributed major articles on the Old Norse sagas Hervarar saga ok Heiðreks and Hrómundar saga Gripssonar and a series on the relationship of Ibsen’s Peer Gynt to the writings of Christian Molbech and others.

== Family ==
His parents Albert Barney and Abigail (née Lindley) Andrews were farm people. Their family name can be traced back to John and Mary Andrews, who in 1640 were among the earliest English settlers of Farmington, Connecticut. Andrews married Olga Sophie Wunderli, and they had several children.
