= Hazen =

Hazen may refer to:

- Hazen (name)
- Hazen High School (disambiguation), various high schools
- Hazen Street, an American pop punk group
- Hazen–Williams equation, a pressure loss formula
- Hazen unit, a unit of measurement for the discolouration of water
- a 6-row feed barley variety

== Places ==
- Lake Hazen, the northernmost lake of Canada
- Hazenland, an island in Greenland
- Hazen Strait, a strait in northern Canada

=== United States ===
- Hazen, Arkansas, a city in Prairie County
- Hazen, Nevada, an unincorporated community in Churchill County
- Hazen, New Hampshire, a village of Whitefield
- Hazen, North Dakota, a city in Mercer County
- Hazen, Beaver County, Pennsylvania, a census-designated place
- Hazen, Jefferson County, Pennsylvania, an unincorporated community
- Hazen Bay, a bay of the Bering Sea, Alaska

== See also ==
- Czech handball (národní házená in Czech), an outdoor ball game
