= Annie Morrill Smith =

American botanist and bryologist

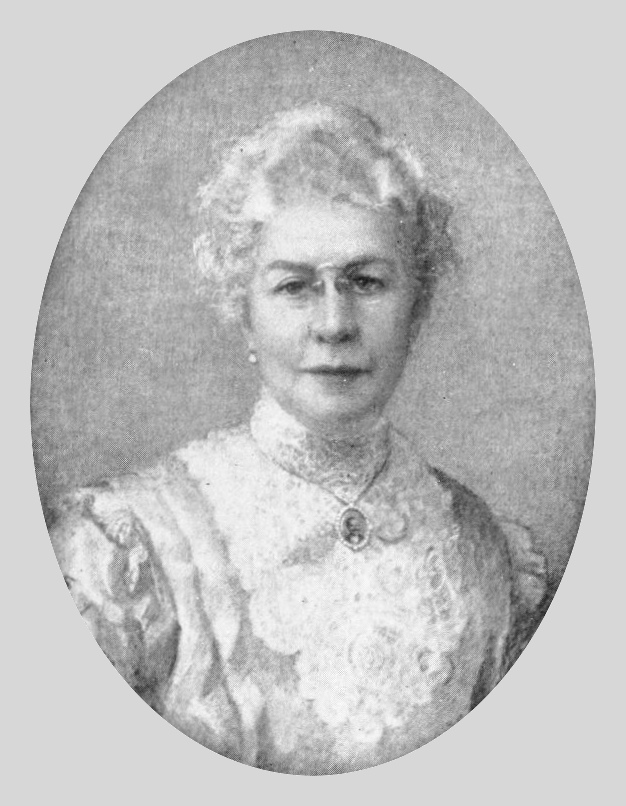
- Born: February 13, 1856; New York City, United States
- Died: November 26, 1946 (aged 90)

Annie Morrill Smith (February 13, 1856 – November 11, 1946) was an American botanist and bryologist from Brooklyn. She was a largely self-taught scientist, and became an important member of the Sullivant Moss Society. From 1906 to 1911 she acted as the sole editor of The Bryologist. She also published a number of important genealogical books.

== Early life and education ==
Born Annie Elizabeth Morrill, she was a daughter of Cynthia (Langdon) and Henry Edwin Morrill, M.D. She was educated at Packer Collegiate Institute, and in 1880 married Hugh Montgomery Smith.

When she was young, Annie Morrill Smith had studied botany abroad, and became interested in bryophytes and lichens. She was acquainted with Elizabeth Gertrude Britton and Abel Joel Grout, cofounders of the Sullivant Moss Society.

== Career ==
Following the unexpected death of her husband in 1897, Smith became associate editor of The Bryologist, a journal published by the Sullivant Moss Society. In 1905, she became the formal editor and served in this role until 1911. During this time, Smith used much of her personal wealth to keep the Society solvent. She served as treasurer of the Society for 10 years; she was vice president for seven years; and president for two years. The standard author abbreviation A.M.Sm. is used to indicate this person as the author when citing a botanical name.

Smith also published several genealogical books, including From One Generation To Another (1906) about the Langdon family, Morrill Kindred in America (1914) about the Morrills, and Ancestors of Henry Montgomery Smith and Catherine Forshee (1921). She is buried at Green-Wood Cemetery, Brooklyn.
