= Inez M. Haring =

American botanist, bryologist and plant collector (1875–1968)

Inez Maria Haring
- Born: October 12, 1875; Medina, Ohio
- Died: June 5, 1968; Bloomington, Indiana
- Other name: Inez Maria Eccleston
- Education: Western Reserve University; Vassar College; Cornell University
- Spouse: Harry Albert Haring
- Scientific career
- Fields: Botany; Bryology
- Workplaces: New York Botanical Garden
- Author abbrev. (botany): I. M. Haring

Inez Maria Haring (née Inez Maria Eccleston) (October 12, 1875 - June 5, 1968) was an American botanist and plant collector, best known for her work in bryology as the Assistant Honorary Curator of Mosses at the New York Botanical Garden beginning in 1945.

== Early life and family ==
Haring was born Inez Maria Eccleston (to William F. Eccleston and Narcissa Graham Eccleston), on October 12, 1875 in Medina, Ohio. She married writer and editor Harry Albert Haring (November 27, 1875 - October 12, 1937), author of Our Catskill Mountains and editor of The Slabsides Book of John Burroughs, on November 4, 1899 in Cleveland, Ohio. With her husband, she had one son, H. Albert Haring, Jr., who was an Assistant Professor of Economics at Lehigh University.

Haring lived in Cleveland, Ohio from 1876 until 1920. From 1920 until 1963 she spent her summers in the Catskill Mountains (with short appointments at the New York Botanical Garden between 1941 and 1949) and her winters in the Western United States.

Haring was a Daughter of the American Revolution, descended from Gershom Eggleston.

== Career ==
Haring graduated from Western Reserve University with a Bachelor of Letters (B.L.) degree in 1898, and a Master of Arts (A.M.) in Mineralogy at Case University in 1899. She was awarded an additional A.M. in Botany from Vassar College in 1934, and additionally began work towards a PhD at Cornell University, although there is no record of her completing this degree, and her year of enrollment is not known. She began working (during the summers and on short-term projects) at the New York Botanical Garden in 1941, in the Elizabeth Gertrude Britton Moss Herbarium, and was appointed the Assistant Honorary Curator of Mosses in 1945.

She worked closely with Abel Joel Grout, rearranging the collections of the Moss Herbarium and travelling with Grout to the American Southwest on specimen collecting trips. She also is listed as a co-author of Grout's work "Moss flora of North America, north of Mexico."

Haring was a member of the Torrey Botanical Society, serving on the Field Committee for the organization. She was also a member of the Sullivant Moss Society, now known as the American Bryological and Lichenological Society. Additionally, she helped develop the Campfire Girls of America Association and wrote for Boys' Life.

== Collections ==
The William & Lynda Steere Herbarium of the New York Botanical Garden holds approximately 4,000 of her collections. A selection of these specimens have been digitized and can be viewed through the C. V. Starr Virtual Herbarium. The majority of these bryophyte collections are from New York State and the western United States, specifically Arizona.

At the time of her death in 1968, collections of materials from the Grand Canyon area also resided at the Grand Canyon Museum and the Museum of Northern Arizona in Flagstaff, Arizona.

== Death ==
Haring died in 1968 in Bloomington, Indiana, at the age of 92.

== Selected publications ==
- Haring, Inez M. "A checklist of the mosses of the state of Arizona." The Bryologist 64, no. 2/3 (1961): 222-240.
- Roberts, Edith Adelaide, and Inez M. Haring. The water relations of the cell walls of certain mosses as a determining factor in their distribution. Chronica Botanica Company, 1937.
- Haring, Inez M. "Plant growth under electric light." The Bryologist 33, no. 6 (1930): 89-99.
- Haring, Inez M. "Mosses Collected by the Robert A. Bartlett Greenland Expedition 1940." The Bryologist 46, no. 3 (1943): 88-91. doi:10.2307/3239037.
