= Carolyn Wilson Harris =

American botanist (1849–1910)

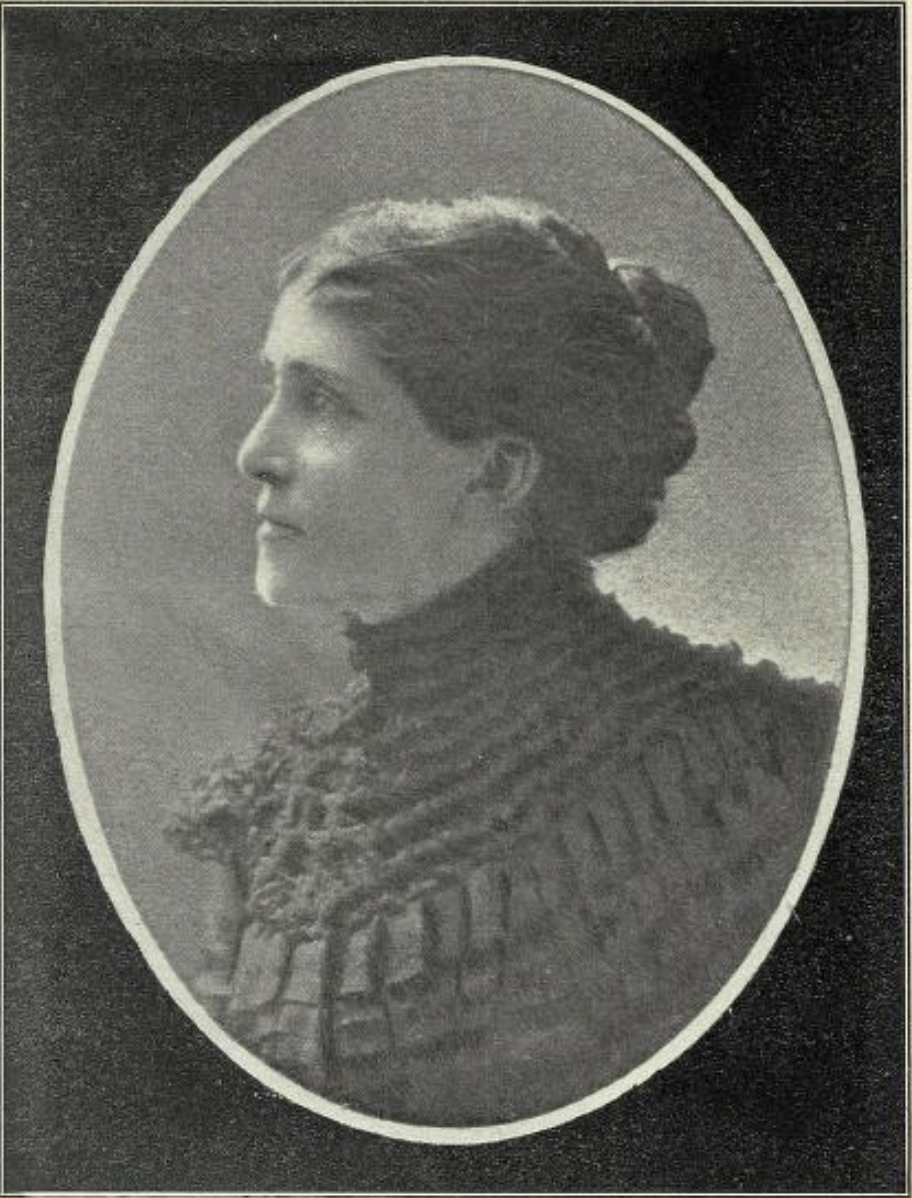
- Born: Carolyn Wilson; December 8, 1849; Springfield, Ohio, U.S.
- Died: May 3, 1910 (aged 60); Lakewood, New Jersey, U.S.
- Occupation: Lichenologist
- Years active: 1901-1910
- Spouse: Isaac Harris

Signature
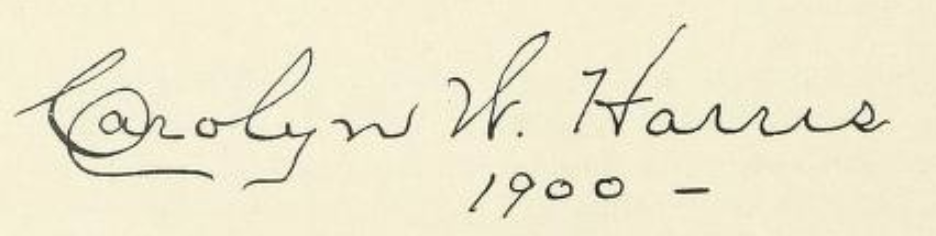

Carolyn Wilson Harris (December 8, 1849 – May 3, 1910) was vice president of the Sullivant Moss Society during 1904–1905 and charge of the Lichen Department from 1901 to 1905. She also wrote many articles on various lichen genera and species. She was known for being an indefatigable worker, and did much to popularize the study of lichens; her help was always given freely and cheerfully to those who applied to her for assistance in their studies.

== Early life ==
Harris was born Carolyn Wilson in Springfield, Ohio. Around 1885, Harris and her husband purchased land on Chilson Lake, in Essex County, New York.

== Career ==
=== The Sullivant Moss Society ===
Harris was an active member of the Sullivant Moss Chapter, originally formed as a Moss Chapter of the Agassiz Association, and founded by Abel Joel Grout and Elizabeth Gertrude Knight Britton, and eventually renamed the Sullivant Moss Society. Harris contributed new plants to the Society from around Chilson Lake and helped to determine the classification of other members' submissions. She served as organizer and first head of the Society's Lichen Department from 1901 to 1905, and its Vice-President from 1904-1905. She donated many specimens to the Society's lichen herbarium.

The Sullivant Moss Chapter is now known as the American Bryological and Lichenological Society.

=== The Bryologist ===
Harris was the first to publish about lichens in The Bryologist, a scientific journal devoted primarily to mosses, which was edited by Abel Joel Grout and Annie Morrill Smith. Harris published a series of 12 papers on lichens (see Publications), which provided beginners with an overview of their physiology and directions on how to identify and distinguish them from mosses. With careful textual descriptions, illustrations, and photographs, Harris hoped to describe lichens well enough that they could be recognized with a simple hand lens.

== Personal life ==
Harris was married to Isaac Harris (1838–1907) of Brooklyn, New York. They had one son, Wilson Park Harris.

In 1905, Harris contracted a serious illness which prevented her from continuing her work with the Sullivan Moss Society. She died of pneumonia on May 3, 1910, in Lakewood, New Jersey.

== Works and publications ==
The standard author abbreviation C.W.Harris is used to indicate this person as the author when citing a botanical name. Note: Those marked with an (*) were published anonymously

- Harris, Carolyn W.(*) (January 1901). "Lichens: The Usneas". The Bryologist. 4 (1): 13–15. doi:10.2307/3238879. JSTOR 3238879.
- Harris, Carolyn W. (April 1901). "Lichens: Alectoria, Evernia, Ramalina". The Bryologist. 4 (2): 36–39. doi:10.2307/3238072. JSTOR 3238072.
- Harris, Carolyn W. (July 1901). "Lichens: Cetraria". The Bryologist. 4 (3): 41–45. doi:10.2307/3238596. JSTOR 3238596.
- Harris, Carolyn W.(*) (October 1901). "Correction: Lichens: Cetraria". The Bryologist. 4 (4): 76. doi:10.2307/3237547. JSTOR 3237547.
- Harris, Carolyn W. (October 1901). "Lichens: Parmelia". The Bryologist. 4 (4): 57–61. doi:10.2307/3237541. JSTOR 3237541.
- Harris, Carolyn W. (March 1902). "Lichens: Physcia". The Bryologist. 5 (2): 21–24. doi:10.2307/3237906. JSTOR 3237906.
- Harris, Carolyn W. (July 1902). "Lichens: Theloschistes, Pyxine". The Bryologist. 5 (4): 59–62. doi:10.2307/3238865. JSTOR 3238865.
- Harris, Carolyn W. (November 1902). "Lichens: Umbilicaria". The Bryologist. 5 (6): 89–92. doi:10.2307/3238586. JSTOR 3238586.
- Harris, Carolyn W. (March 1903). "Report of the Lichen Department". The Bryologist. 6 (2): 39–40. doi:10.1639/0007-2745(1903)6[39:smcn]2.0.co;2. JSTOR 3238819.
- Harris, Carolyn W. (July 1903). "Lichens: Sticta". The Bryologist. 6 (4): 55–58. doi:10.2307/3238494. JSTOR 3238494.
- Harris, Carolyn W. (September 1903). "Lichens: Nephroma-Solorina". The Bryologist. 6 (5): 76–79. doi:10.2307/3238783. JSTOR 3238783.
- Harris, Wilson P.; Harris, Carolyn W. (1904). Lichens and Mosses of Montana, a List Based on Material Collected During the Summer of 1901, and Additions. Missoula: University of Montana. OCLC 9117314.
- Harris, Carolyn W. (January 1904). "Lichens: Peltigera". The Bryologist. 7 (1): 1–4. doi:10.2307/3237727. JSTOR 3237727.
- Harris, Carolyn W. (May 1904). "Lichens: Collema and Leptogium". The Bryologist. 7 (3): 45–48. doi:10.2307/3238276. JSTOR 3238276.
- Harris, Carolyn W. (September 1904). "Lichens: Stereocaulon, Pilophorus and Thamnolia". The Bryologist. 7 (5): 71–73. doi:10.2307/3238840. JSTOR 3238840.
- Harris, Carolyn W. (May 1906). "A List of Foliaceous and Fruticous Lichens". The Bryologist. 9 (3): 48–52. doi:10.2307/3238302. JSTOR 3238302.
