= Stanley A. Cain =

American botanist (1902–1995)

Stanley Adair Cain (19 June 1902, Deputy, Indiana – 1 April 1995, Santa Cruz, California) was a botanist and pioneer of plant ecology and environmental studies.

== Biography ==
Cain graduated from Butler University with B.S. in 1924 and from the University of Chicago with M.S. in 1927 and with PhD in 1930. His doctoral dissertation on the heath balds of the Great Smoky Mountains was based upon field work in 1929 and 1930. His doctoral advisor was George D. Fuller (1869–1961). At Butler University's department of botany, Cain was an instructor from 1924 to 1927, an assistant professor from 1927 to 1930, and an associate professor from 1930 to 1931. At Indiana University, he was an assistant professor of botany from 1931 to 1933 and a research associate in the Waterman Institute from 1933 to 1935. Cain was a plant sociologist, during the summers from 1935 to 1938 at Cold Spring Harbor Laboratory. He was an associate professor from 1935 to 1946 at the University of Tennessee. There he had a year's leave of absence as a Guggenheim Fellow for the academic year 1940–1941 when he worked on his treatise Foundations of Plant Geography. In 1945 Cain was a lieutenant colonel in the U.S. Army and served as chief of the scientific section of the American Army University in Biarritz in the French Basque Country.

From 1946 to 1950 Cain was a research associate at the Cranbrook Institute of Science in Bloomfield Hills, Michigan. In 1950 Samuel Trask Dana appointed him to the Charles Lathrop Pack Professorship of Conservation in the University of Michigan's School of Natural Resources. Cain established the Department of Conversation in the School of Natural Resources and served as the department's chair from 1950 to 1961. In 1950 he was simultaneously appointed a full professor in the University of Michigan's Department of Botany. For the academic year 1955–1956 he was a member of the U.N. Technical Assistance Mission to Brazil, where he collaborated with Dr. G. M. de Oliveira Castro, a specialist in tropical medicine, in preparing their Manual of Vegetation Analysis (1959). The purpose of the U.N. Mission was to study rainforest vegetation in order to provide information for mosquito control in Brazil's efforts to prevent malaria. From 1965 to 1968 Cain was on leave of absence so that he could serve as Assistant Secretary of the Interior in the Johnson Administration. At the University of Michigan he resumed his academic duties in 1968 and retired in 1972. After retiring from the University of University of Michigan, he became an adjunct professor at the University of Santa Cruz.

He was the author or co-author of over 100 articles in scientific journals, including Botanical Gazette, Ecological Monographs, American Midland Naturalist, Ecology, The Bryologist, Castanea, and American Journal of Botany. He contributed the article Archidiaceae to Grout's Moss flora of North America, north of Mexico, vol. 1 (1928).

Renowned ecologist Stanley A. Cain was one of the first scientists to establish pollen analysis as a paleoecological resource for characterizing past ecosystems. In 1941, he published Foundations of Plant Geography, which distilled a large amount of scientific work from varying disciplines into one of the most comprehensive and insightful ecological studies ever written. Cain founded the Department of Conservation at the University of Michigan in 1950, the first academic department of its kind in the country.

In 1940 Cain married Louise Gilbert (1911–1993). Cain, an experienced administrator, worked with Jean Campbell and Jane Likert to create the University of Michigan's Center for Continuing Education of Women. Their son Stephen Cain had a long, distinguished career as a newspaper reporter and editor in Michigan.

The standard author abbreviation S.A.Cain is used to indicate this person as the author when citing a botanical name.

== Awards and honors ==
- 1940 – Guggenheim Fellow
- 1958 – president of the Ecological Society of America
- 1959 – honorary doctorate, University of Montreal
- 1965 – Michigan Conservationist of the Year
- 1969 – Eminent Ecologist Award, Ecological Society of America
- 1970 – member of the National Academy of Sciences

== Eponyms ==
- Calamagrostis cainii named by A. S. Hitchcock in 1934, based upon a specimen collected by Cain
