= Evansia (journal) =

- Discipline: Bryology and lichenology
- Language: English

Publication details
- History: 1984–present
- Publisher: American Bryological and Lichenological Society (United States)
- Frequency: Quarterly

Standard abbreviations
- ISO 4: Evansia

Indexing
- ISSN: 0747-9859 (print); 2330-9148 (web)
- LCCN: 85643005
- OCLC no.: 703226082

Links
- Journal homepage

Evansia is a quarterly, peer-reviewed scientific journal, publishing research on issues in biology and environmental preservation related to lichenology and bryology, primarily in North America. It is published quarterly by the American Bryological and Lichenological Society (ABLS) and serves as the information bulletin of the ABLS. Articles are frequently popular or semi-technical rather than technical and intended for both amateurs and professionals. There are reports on local flora and presentations of techniques for studying and curating lichens, bryophytes, and hepatics. The ABLS named the journal in honor of Alexander William Evans.
