= Aaron John Sharp =

American botanist and bryologist (1904–1997)

- A. J. Sharp, 1969
- Born: July 29, 1904; Plain City, Ohio
- Died: November 16, 1997 (aged 93); Knoxville, Tennessee
- Education: Ohio Wesleyan University; University of Oklahoma; Ohio State University
- Known for: Bryology
- Scientific career
- Fields: Botany
- Workplaces: University of Tennessee
- Thesis: Taxonomic and Ecological Studies of Eastern Tennessee Bryophytes (1939)
- Doctoral students: Daniel H. Norris; Allen C. Skorepa
- Author abbrev. (botany): Sharp

Aaron John Sharp (July 29, 1904 – November 16, 1997), known professionally as Jack Sharp, was an American botanist and bryologist, considered an expert on mosses. The standard author abbreviation Sharp is used to indicate this person as the author when citing a botanical name.

== Early life ==
Sharp was raised on a dairy farm near East Liberty, Ohio. He attended Ohio Wesleyan University and earned his degree in botany in 1927. After receiving his undergraduate degree, Sharp was introduced to bryology by George Elwood Nichols while taking his classes at the University of Michigan Biological Station. Sharp earned his M.S. from the University of Oklahoma while studying under Paul Sears in 1929.

== Career ==
In 1929, Sharp moved to Knoxville, Tennessee and began teaching at the University of Tennessee. Although he was accepted into the Ph.D program at Yale University, financial troubles led him to complete his doctorate at Ohio State University in 1938. Sharp became a full professor at the University of Tennessee in 1946, and between 1951 and 1961, he was head of the Department of Botany.

Sharp served as president of the Botanical Society of America in 1965. He retired from the University of Tennessee in 1974 but remained as an emeritus professor. Sharp was made Fellow of the Linnean Society in 1992.

== Legacy ==
Two genera of moss were named in his honor; Neosharpiella in the family Bartramiaceae in 1973, and Unclejackia (in family Brachytheciaceae) by Daniel H. Norris in 1999. A species of shrub, Magnolia sharpii was also named by Dr. Faustino Miranda in 1955.

Two awards bear his name; The Sharp Fund is a monetary award at the University of Tennessee for floristic studies in plants, and The Sharp Award of the American Bryological and Lichenological Society is presented to the best student paper at each annual meeting.

== Awards ==
- Fellow of the American Association for the Advancement of Science, 1944
- Guggenheim Fellow, 1944–1946
- Honorary Doctorate of Science, Ohio Wesleyan University, 1952
- Merit Award of the Botanical Society of America, 1973
- Distinguished Professor Emeritus, University of Tennessee, 1974
- Elizabeth Ann Bartholomew Award, Southern Appalachian Botanical Society, 1989
- Order of the Rising Sun (3rd class), Japan, 1990
- Distinguished Service Award, Tennessee Environmental Education Association, 1991
- Fellow of the Linnean Society, 1992
- Distinguished Achievement Citation, Ohio Wesleyan University, 1993
- Eloise Payne Luguer Medal, Garden Club of America, 1993

== Selected publications ==
- Sharp, Aaron John (1945). Notas sobre la flora de la región escarpada de la parte noroeste del Estado de Puebla.
- Shanks, Royal Eastman; Sharp, Aaron John (1950). Summer Key to Tennessee Trees. University of Tennessee.
- Sharp, A. J.; H. Crum; P. M. Eckel, eds. (1994). Moss Flora of Mexico. Memoirs of the New York Botanical Garden 69, vols. 1–2.
- Campbell, Carlos Clinton; Hutson, William F.; Sharp, Aaron John (1977). Great Smoky Mountains Wildflowers. University of Tennessee Press. ISBN 9780608014357.
- Fulford, Margaret; Sharp, Aaron John (1990). The Leafy Hepaticae of Mexico: One Hundred and Twenty-seven Years After C.M. Gottsche. New York Botanical Garden. ISBN 9780893273613.
