= Elva Lawton =

American botanist

- Born: April 3, 1896; West Middletown
- Died: February 3, 1993 (aged 96)
- Alma mater: University of Pittsburgh; University of Michigan
- Occupation: Botanist, bryologist, botanical collector
- Employer: Hunter College; University of Washington

Elva Lawton (April 3, 1896 – February 3, 1993) was an American botanist and bryologist known for her research on ferns early in her career and her late-career comprehensive study of the mosses of the Western United States.

== Early life and education ==
Elva Lawton was born in West Middletown, Pennsylvania on April 3, 1896. Prior to matriculating at university, she was an elementary school teacher in Pennsylvania from 1915 to 1919. She attended the University of Pittsburgh for her bachelor's degree, which she earned in 1923, and her master's degree, which she earned in 1925. From 1923 to 1925 she was also a high school biology and Latin teacher in Crafton, Pennsylvania. She then moved to the University of Michigan for her doctoral studies and received her Ph.D. in 1932 with a dissertation on induced polyploidy and regeneration in ferns. During her doctoral studies, Lawton earned a fellowship and was a laboratory assistant in the Michigan department of botany; she was also a biology instructor at Hunter College. She was also a researcher at the Cold Spring Harbor Laboratory from 1928 to 1932.

== Career and research ==
After earning her Ph.D., Lawton went on to become an assistant professor at Hunter; she ended her career there in 1959 as an associate professor. That year, she moved to the University of Washington, where she curated the herbarium's bryophytes, served as a research associate, and lectured on bryophytes. While at Hunter, she did research at the Michigan Biological Station (in 1949) and at the University of Iowa's Lakeside Laboratory (in 1950–1953). While working at the University of Washington she collected mosses from throughout the American West and worked on identifying previously unknown species of moss; Lawton received several grants from the National Science Foundation to continue her work. She worked almost until the end of her life. Lawton died on 3 February 1993.

The standard author abbreviation E.Lawton is used to indicate this person as the author when citing a botanical name.

== Honors and legacy ==
Lawton was a member of the Torrey Botanical Club and served as an officer from 1947 to 1954 and president in 1955. The species Racomitrium lawtoniae and the genus Bryolawtonia are named after her.
