= C. W. Harris =

C. W. Harris is a name referring to the following people:

- Carolyn Wilson Harris (1849–1910), American lichenologist
- Curtis West Harris (1924–2017), African-American minister, civil rights activist, and politician
