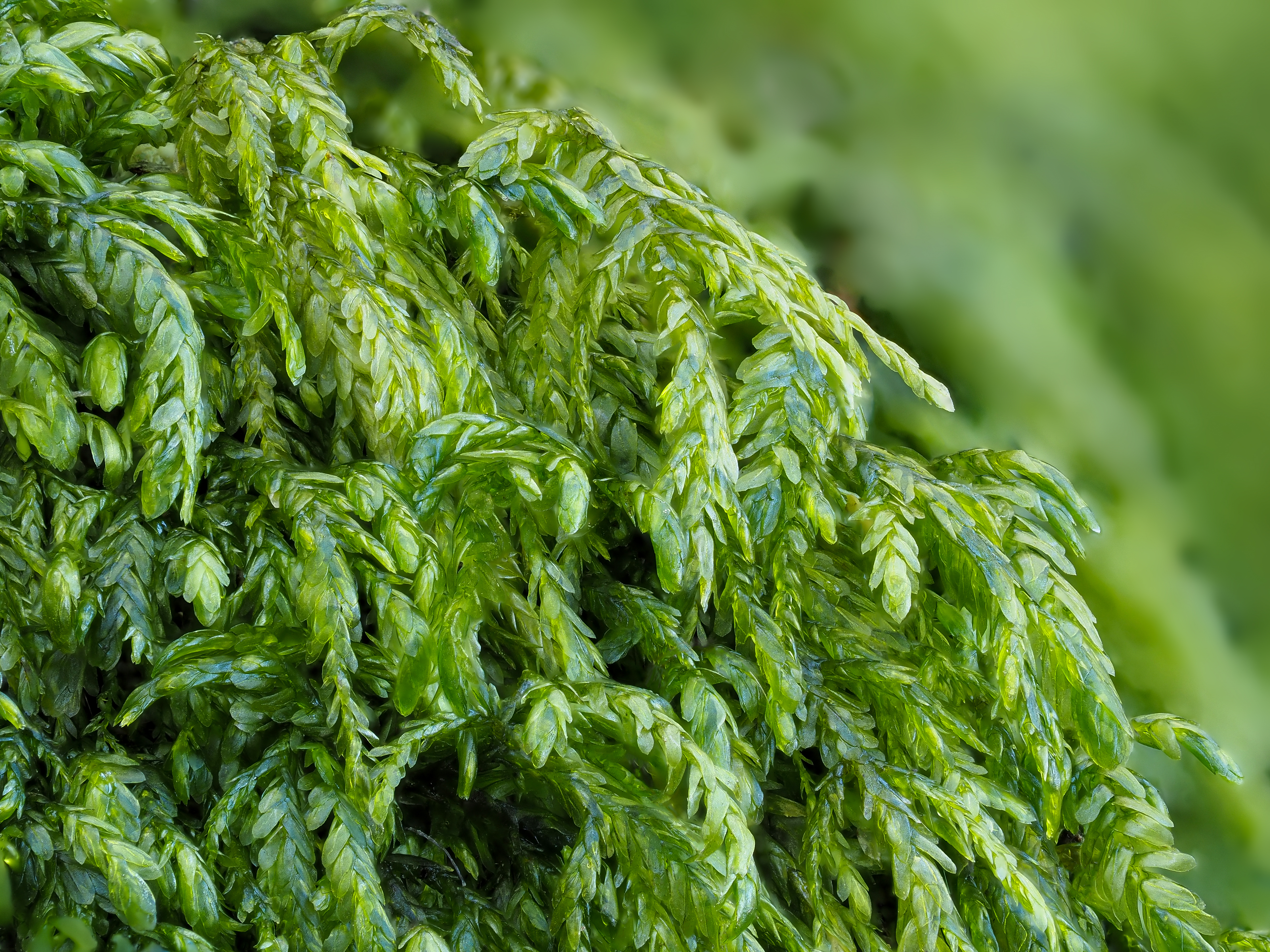
- Bryolawtonia vancouveriensis

Scientific classification
- Kingdom: Plantae
- Clade: Embryophytes
- Division: Bryophyta
- Class: Bryopsida
- Subclass: Bryidae
- Order: Hypnales
- Family: Lembophyllaceae
- Genus: Bryolawtonia; D.H.Norris & Enroth

= Bryolawtonia =

Genus of mosses

Bryolawtonia is a monotypic genus of mosses belonging to the family Neckeraceae. It only contains one known species, Bryolawtonia vancouveriensis Norris & Enroth, 1990

The species of this genus are found in Northern America.

The genus name of Bryolawtonia is in honour of Elva Lawton (1896-1993), who was an American botanist and bryologist.

The genus was circumscribed by Daniel Howard Norris and Johannes Enroth in Bryologist vol.93 (Issue 3) on page 329 in 1990.
