= Caroline Coventry Haynes =

American bryologist and painter

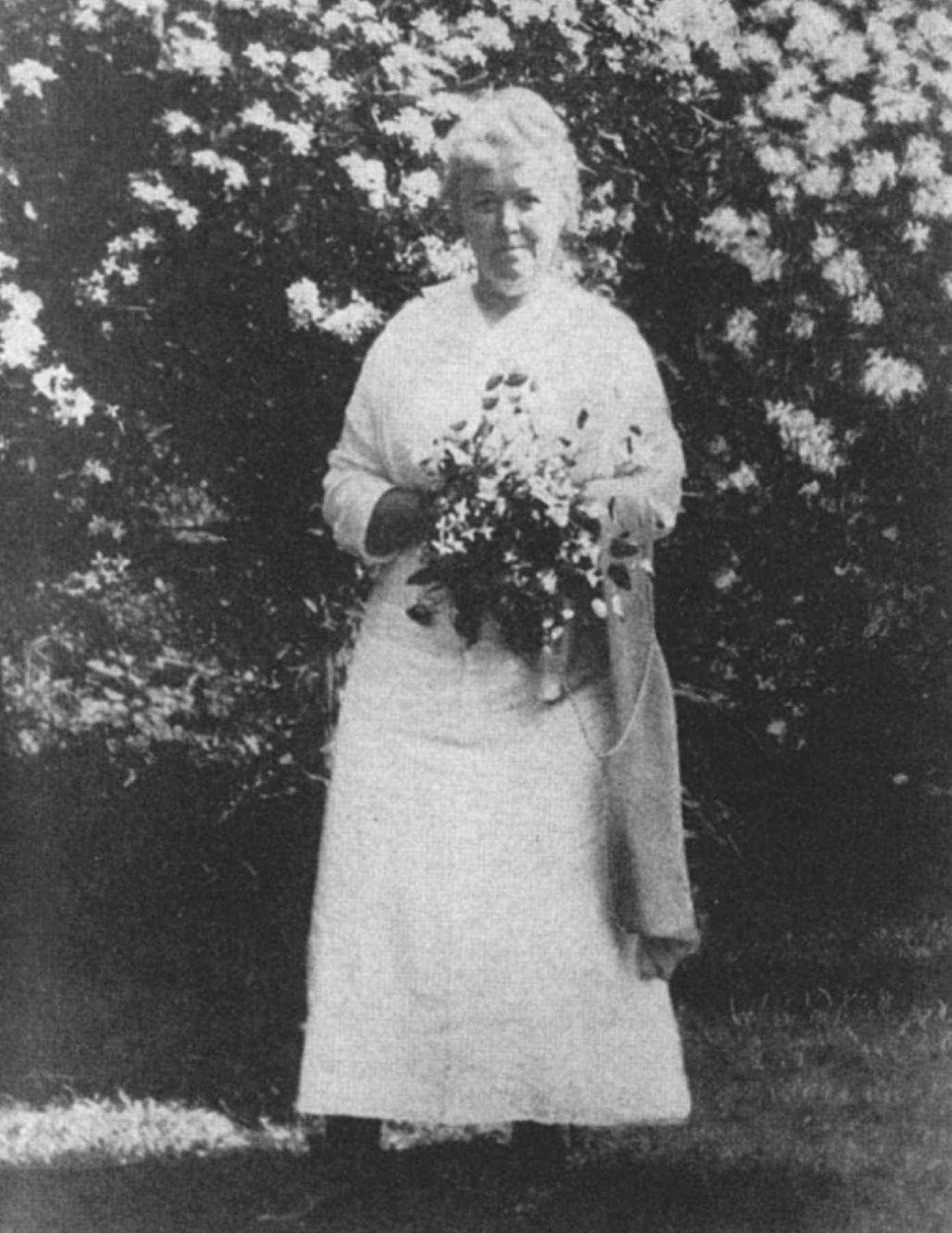
- Born: April 13, 1858; New York City
- Died: September 4, 1951 (aged 93)
- Occupation: Bryologist, botanical collector, painter, scientific illustrator, scientific collector

Signature
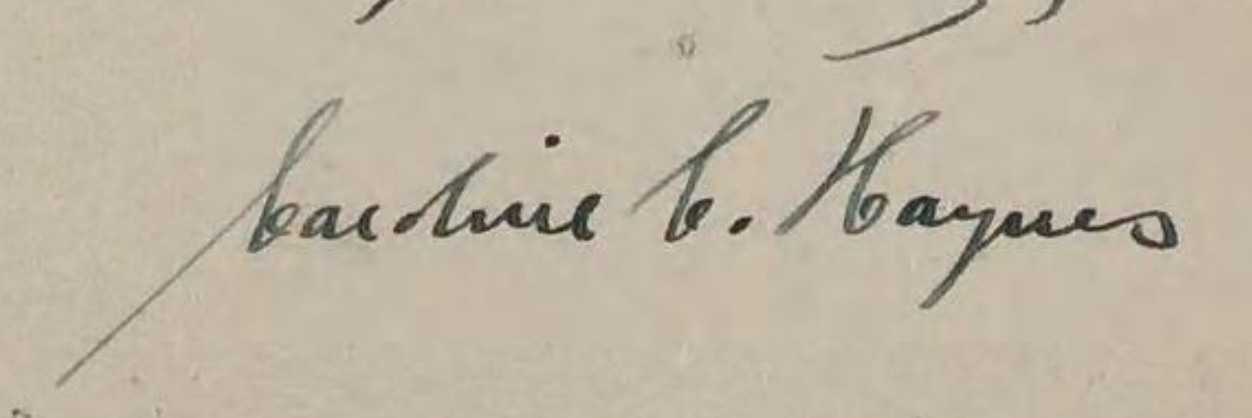

Caroline Coventry Haynes (April 13, 1858 – September 4, 1951) was an American bryologist and painter, known for her study of liverworts and other hepatics.

== Early life and artistic career ==
Haynes was born on April 13, 1858 in New York to Caroline DeForest and her husband Frederick William Haynes. She completed her formal education at schools in New York and then travelled to Paris where she studied painting with William-Adolphe Bouguereau and Claude Monet. During the 1890s Haynes was a member of the New York Water Color Club and exhibited at several annual exhibitions. She also exhibited a work at the National Academy of Design Annual Exhibit in 1897. She was a member and served as president of the Woman's Art Club of New York in 1899. In the early 1900s she was appointed a member of the jury of selection for the New York Water Color Club annual exhibition and also served on the hanging committee. A painting by Haynes is held at the New-York Historical Society.

== Botanical career ==
Haynes returned to New York from Paris in 1902 and studied botany with Marshall A. Howe at the New York Botanic Garden. Haynes was a strong supporter and contributor of the Sullivant Moss Society and The Bryologist botanical journal. She frequently gave aid in times of financial difficulties to the Society. Between 1908 and 1913 she issued the exsiccata series American Hepaticae. Prepared by Carolyn Coventry Haynes.

The standard author abbreviation Haynes is used to indicate this person as the author when citing a botanical name.
