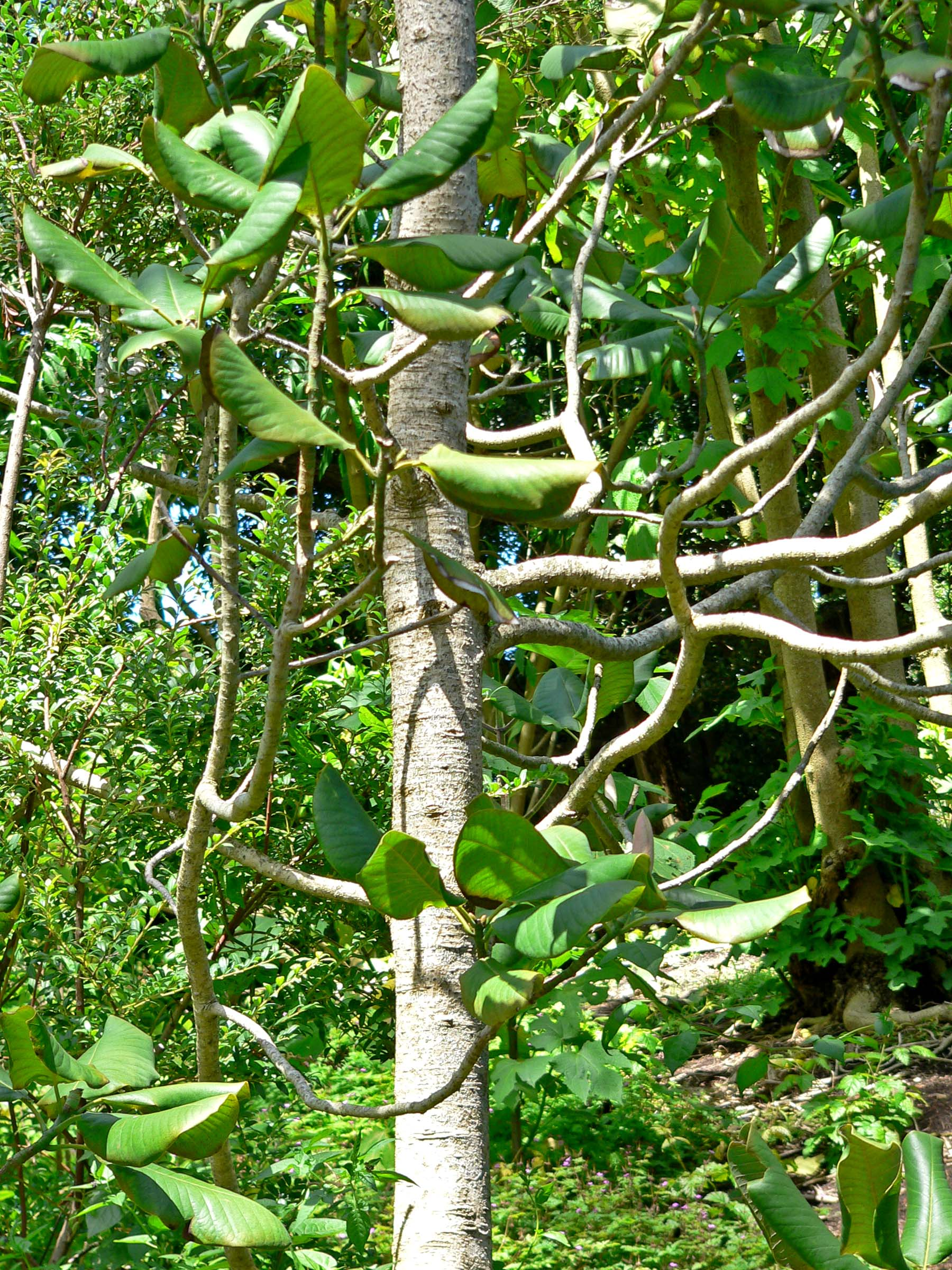

Conservation status
- Endangered (IUCN 3.1)

Scientific classification
- Kingdom: Plantae
- Clade: Embryophytes
- Clade: Tracheophytes
- Clade: Spermatophytes
- Clade: Angiosperms
- Clade: Magnoliids
- Order: Magnoliales
- Family: Magnoliaceae
- Genus: Magnolia
- Section: Magnolia sect. Magnolia
- Species: M. sharpii

Binomial name
- Magnolia sharpii Miranda (1955)

= Magnolia sharpii =

Species of flowering plant

Magnolia sharpii is a tree species of Magnolia from Chiapas, Mexico. It grows in wet tropical habitats.

== Description ==
Magnolia sharpii is a large tree, growing up to 25 meters tall with a trunk more than 50 cm in diameter.

== Range and habitat ==
Magnolia sharpii is endemic to the Central Highlands of Chiapas, where it is known from scattered localities between 1,950 and 2,940 meters elevation. The species' estimated extent of occurrence (EOO) is 2,228 km^{2}.

Its typical habitat is on steep slopes or in ravines in cloud forests and humid oak and pine–oak forests. It favors mature closed-canopy forests dominated by oaks which sustain a cool and moist forest floor environment. It is shade-tolerant but intolerant of prolonged drought.

== Conservation and threats ==
The species has a small, scattered population, and is threatened by severe deforestation across much of its range. It favors undisturbed forests which are becoming rarer across its range. Its conservation status is assessed as endangered.

== Prehistory ==
Fossil records indicate that the species was widely distributed in North America during the Miocene, with widespread fossils from Canada, the United States, Mexico, and Central America. Over 25 million years its range contracted, and the species is now limited to a disjunct distribution across a small area of Mexico.

== Name ==
The specific epithet of sharpii, refers to Aaron John Sharp (1904–1997), known professionally as Jack Sharp, who was an American botanist and bryologist, considered an expert on mosses.
