= Fulfordianthus evansii =

Conservation status
- Vulnerable (IUCN 2.3)

Scientific classification
- Kingdom: Plantae
- Division: Marchantiophyta
- Class: Jungermanniopsida
- Order: Lejeuneales
- Family: Lejeuneaceae
- Genus: Fulfordianthus
- Species: F. evansii

Binomial name
- Fulfordianthus evansii (Fulford) Gradst.

Synonyms
- Thysananthus evansii Fulford

Species of liverwort

Fulfordianthus evansii is a species of liverwort in the family Lejeuneaceae. It is found in Belize, Costa Rica, Guatemala, and Panama. Its natural habitat is subtropical or tropical moist lowland forests.

== Taxonomy ==
The species was first described as Thysananthus evansii by Margaret Fulford in 1941, publishing the description in the Bulletin of the Torrey Botanical Club. In 1992, Stephan Robbert Gradstein transferred it to the genus Fulfordianthus, creating its current accepted binomial name. In the same year, Schuster attempted to move the species to Thysanopsis, but this combination was not validly published. The type specimen was collected in Punta Gorda, Belize, though the collector's identity is unknown. This holotype is housed in the herbarium of the Cincinnati Museum Center (CINC).

== Description ==
Fulfordianthus evansii is a small liverwort with irregularly branching stems that grow up to 2 cm (0.79 in) long and 2 mm (0.079 in) wide. Female plants show a distinctive forking pattern when reproductive structures are present. The stem's surface is composed of 60–90 rows of cells.

The leaves have two distinct parts: a larger upper (dorsal) lobe and a smaller lower (ventral) lobule. The upper lobe is oblong in shape, about 1 mm long and 0.5–0.6 mm wide. Its edges show tiny tooth-like projections formed by protruding cells, particularly in the upper half. Under magnification, the leaf cells appear square to hexagonal in the middle of the leaf, becoming more elongated near the base. Unlike many related species, this liverwort lacks oil bodies within its cells.

The lower leaf lobules are very small (0.1–0.2 mm long) and feature a distinctive long, curved tooth made up of up to 10 cells. The underleaves, which are leaf-like structures on the plant's underside, overlap loosely and spread outward, measuring about 0.5–0.6 mm long and slightly wider than long, with small teeth along their upper edges.

The male and female reproductive structures (androecia and gynoecia) follow the typical pattern for the genus. The protective leaves around the female reproductive structures (bracts) are oblong with irregular teeth along their upper edges. The perianth (the protective structure around the developing reproductive organs) is typical for the genus, featuring a small beak-like projection 3–10 cells long. The spore-producing structure (sporophyte) has not been observed in this species.

== Distribution and habitat ==
Fulfordianthus evansii grows as an epiphyte on tree trunks in undisturbed lowland rainforest of Central America, where it occurs at sea level. The species has been documented in four countries: Guatemala, Belize, Costa Rica, and Panama. It is rare, known from only about half a dozen collections across its range. The species has been found in Tortuguero National Park, Costa Rica, and more recently on Barro Colorado Island, Panama, which represents its only known locality in that country. Historical collections exist from Guatemala's east coast and Belize, though these are older records that have not been recently reconfirmed.

== Conservation status ==
Fulfordianthus evansii is listed as vulnerable on the International Union for the Conservation of Nature Red List under criteria B1 and B2cd, based on its limited distribution and declining habitat. Its habitat requirements are specific, requiring undisturbed lowland rainforest – an ecosystem type that is rapidly disappearing throughout Central America due to deforestation. The species' current status in much of its historical range is uncertain, as many known collections are old. Active conservation efforts and further field surveys are needed to confirm whether populations persist in other parts of its range.
