= Daniel Norris (disambiguation) =

Daniel Norris (born 1993) is an American professional baseball pitcher for the Detroit Tigers of Major League Baseball.

Daniel Norris may also refer to:

- Daniel H. Norris (1933–2017), American botanist
- Daniel L. Norris (1935–2008), Commissioner of the Northwest Territories
- Dan Norris (born 1960), British politician
