= George Elwood Nichols =

American botanist (1882–1939)

- George E. Nichols
- Born: April 12, 1882; Southington, Connecticut, U.S.
- Died: June 20, 1939 (aged 57); New Haven, Connecticut, U.S.
- Education: Yale University
- Scientific career
- Fields: Botany
- Workplaces: Yale University
- Thesis: Morphological Study of Juniperus communis var. depressa (1909)
- Doctoral advisor: Alexander William Evans
- Doctoral students: Frank Egler
- Author abbrev. (botany): Nichols

George Elwood Nichols (1882–1939) was a botanist, bryologist, algologist and ecologist, one of the founders of the Ecological Society of America. The standard author abbreviation Nichols is used to indicate this person as the author when citing a botanical name.

== Early life ==
Nichols was born in Southington, Connecticut on April 12, 1882. After secondary school at Hillhouse High School, Nichols matriculated in 1900 at Yale University, there receiving in 1904 his bachelor's degree and in 1909 his Ph.D.; in 1910 his thesis was published in Beihefte zum Botanischen Centralblatt. In 1914, Nichols helped found the Ecological Society of America.

== Career ==
Nichols started out as a teacher at Yale University's botany department before rising to the positions of assistant professor, associate professor, full professor, and then full professor in 1926. From 1926 until his death, he served simultaneously in three capacities: the Eaton Professor of Botany, chair of Yale's botany department, and director of the Marsh Botanical Garden. Beginning in 1920, each summer he worked at the University of Michigan's biological station at Douglas Lake. At the biological station he studied algae and bryophytes, writing about 25 articles on his findings. Nichols served as the president of the Ecological Society of America in 1932. In 1938, he was elected President of the American Bryological and Lichenological Society, a role which he served until his death.

== Legacy ==
Several species have been named in his honor, including Dicranella nicholsii named by Robert Statham Williams and Hygrohypnum nicholsii named by Abel Joel Grout.

== Selected publications ==
- Evans, A. W. and G. E. Nichols (1908). The Bryophytes of Connecticut. Conn. Geol. & Nat. Hist. Surv., Bull. 11: 1–203.
- Nichols, G. E. (1908). North American species of Amblystegiella. The Bryologist 11: 4–5.
- Evans, A. W. and G. E. Nichols (1935). The liverwort flora of the Upper Michigan Peninsula. The Bryologist 38: 81–91. doi:10.2307/3239361
- Nichols, G. E. and W. C. Steere (1936). Notes on Michigan bryophytes,-III. The Bryologist 39: 111-118 doi:10.2307/3239312
