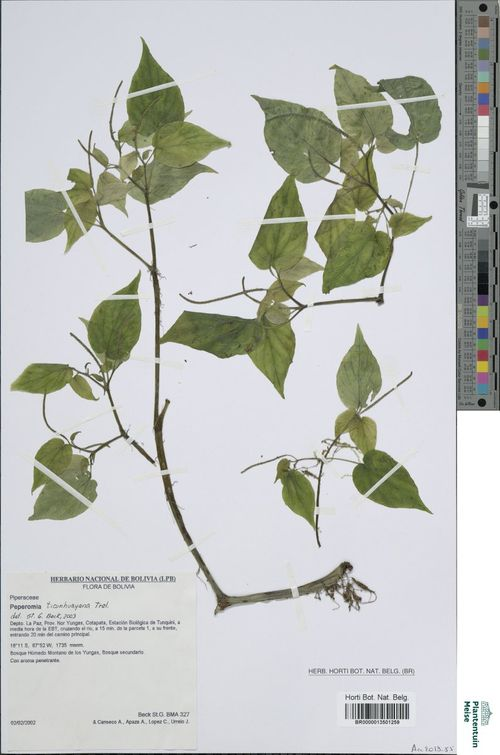

Scientific classification
- Kingdom: Plantae
- Clade: Embryophytes
- Clade: Tracheophytes
- Clade: Spermatophytes
- Clade: Angiosperms
- Clade: Magnoliids
- Order: Piperales
- Family: Piperaceae
- Genus: Peperomia
- Species: P. ticunhuayana

Binomial name
- Peperomia ticunhuayana Trel.

= Peperomia ticunhuayana =

Species of flowering plant

Peperomia ticunhuayana is a species of herb in the genus Peperomia that is endemic in Bolivia. Its conservation status is Threatened.

== Description ==
The first specimens where collected in Ticunhuaya, Bolivia at altitude of 5,000 ft.

Peperomia ticunhuayana is a soft spreading and subpellucid herb. It has 2 mm. twigs, very evanescently soft-pubescent. Its leaves alternate, round to lance-ovate though typically long-acuminate, mostly heart-shaped at a 1.5 x 2-2.5 x 5 cm. Drying very thin, it is 7-nerved, with the laterals forked. Its midrib has about 2 branches. The upper faces have a few short thick soft hairs and the nerves beneath are somehow velvety toward the base. The petiole is about 10 mm long and hirtellous. The spikes are opposite to the leaves, 1 x 20–50 mm though loosely flowered. The peduncle is a subhirtellous with a length of 5 mm. Its bracts are round. The ovary is a mucronate ovoid. And its stigma is nearly at the tip.

== Taxonomy and Naming ==
It was described in 1928 by Trel in Bulletin of the Torrey Botanical Club, from specimens collected by Ralph Tate. It got its name from the location where the specimens were first collected, which was Ticunhuaya, Bolivia.

== Distribution and Habitat ==
It is endemic in Bolivia. It is a herb.

== Conservation ==
This species is assessed as Threatened, in a preliminary report.
