= Fulfordianthus =

Scientific classification
- Kingdom: Plantae
- Division: Marchantiophyta
- Class: Jungermanniopsida
- Order: Lejeuneales
- Family: Lejeuneaceae
- Genus: Fulfordianthus; Gradst.

Genus of liverworts

Fulfordianthus is a genus of liverworts in the family Lejeuneaceae. It is found in central and southern America.

It contains the following species:

- Fulfordianthus evansii (Fulf.) Gradst.
- Fulfordianthus pterobryoides (Spruce) Gradst.

The genus name of Fulfordianthus is in honour of Margaret Hannah Fulford (1904–1999), who was an American bryologist who was active in identifying the flora of North and South America.

The genus was circumscribed by Stephan Robbert Gradstein in Bryologist Vol.95 on page 44 in 1992.
