= Nancy Guttmann Slack =

American plant ecologist, bryologist, and historian of science (1930–2022)

Nancy Guttmann Slack (August 12, 1930 – December 21, 2022) was an American plant ecologist, bryologist, and historian of science. She was the president of the American Bryological and Lichenological Society from 2005 to 2007.

== Biography ==
Nancy Guttmann was born in New York City on August 12, 1930. In December 1951 she married Glen A. Slack. At Cornell University she graduated in June 1952 with B.Sc. in agriculture and in 1954 with M.Sc. Her master's thesis is entitled Variation of the Small Cranberries in Eastern North America. In the late 1950s and the decade of the 1960s she raised three children and helped her husband's career. In 1971 she received her Ph.D. in ecology from the University at Albany, SUNY. Her Ph.D. thesis, entitled Species diversity and community structure in bryophytes, won the Paul C. Lemon Award. After receiving her Ph.D. she became an assistant professor of biology at Russell Sage College and retired there in 2002 as professor emerita. After formal retirement from Russell Sage College, she engaged in “writing books and magazine articles, teaching ecology, natural history, and botany, birding, singing in an oratorio society, reading, and doing scientific travel with her husband.” She has done research on bryophytes, ecosystems of the U.S. Northeast, the ecology of peatlands, ecological niche theory, and the history of ecology and botany.

In 2012 Nancy G. Slack was the project director for an investigation resulting in the report Alpine Snowbed communities of Mt. Washington and the monitoring of Populations of Rare Bryophytes and Lichens in relation to Future Climate Change Project. She received the 2014 Guy Waterman Alpine Steward Award for her lifetime achievement in alpine ecology and conservation work for mountain wilderness in the American Northeast.

Her husband, a physicist and inventor, died in 2019, leaving his widow, three children, and six grandchildren. The Russell Sage College sponsors the Glen and Nancy Slack Endowed Award in the Sciences Fund for outstanding juniors or seniors in "biology, pre-medicine or biochemistry."

Guttmann Slack died on December 21, 2022, at the age of 92.
