= Torrey Botanical Society =

Scholarly society

Torrey Botanical Society (formerly Torrey Botanical Club) was started in the 1860s by colleagues of John Torrey. It is the oldest botanical society in the Americas. The Society promotes the exploration and study of plant life, with particular focus on the flora of the regions surrounding New York City. Members of the group, including Nathaniel Lord Britton and his wife Elizabeth Gertrude Britton, founded the New York Botanical Garden.

== History ==
The Torrey Botanical Society is an organization for people interested in plant life, including professional and amateur botanists, students, and others who simply enjoy nature. The society, which began informally in the 1860s under the aegis and inspiration of Columbia College Professor John Torrey, is thought to be the oldest botanical society in America. The early members were amateur botanists, students, and colleagues of Dr. Torrey, who were interested in collecting and identifying plants and occasionally met in the evening to discuss their findings. The organization was named with the appearance of its first publication, Bulletin of the Torrey Botanical Club, in 1870, and was incorporated in 1871. The Society has published a scientific journal since that time, and currently publishes the Journal of the Torrey Botanical Society quarterly.

Today, the objectives of the Society are “to promote interest in botany, and to collect and disseminate information on all phases of plant science.” These objectives are fulfilled through public lectures, field trips, fellowships and awards that support scholarship and research, and publications. Through outreach and publications, the society has become an international organization and is affiliated with the American Institute of Biological Sciences.

== Publications ==
The Journal of the Torrey Botanical Society (until 1997, Bulletin of the Torrey Botanical Club), the oldest botanical journal in the Americas, has as its primary goal the dissemination of scientific knowledge about plants (in the broad sense of both plants and fungi). It publishes basic research in all areas of plant biology, except horticulture, with emphasis on research done in, and about plants of, the Western Hemisphere. Journal of the Torrey Botanical Society is published in two parts. The first part usually consists of original research papers of five printed pages or more (2.5 double-spaced typed pages equals about one printed page). The second part, TORREYA (once a separate journal), usually consists of general, invited, and review papers, original research papers of less than five printed pages, and papers on distribution, floristics, conservation, and environmental concerns, field trips reports, obituaries, book reviews, and other kinds of articles when availability of space in this section allows for quicker publication than would otherwise occur.

The Society also publishes a memoirs series. Memoirs of the Torrey Botanical Society (until 2005, Memoirs of the Torrey Botanical Club) is published at irregular intervals in volumes of various sizes when a featured subject or a special collation of topics arises. The peer-reviewed Memoirs comprise a series of longer botanical papers (over 50 printed pages long) and monographs that began in 1889. As of October 2021, 69 issues had been published in 28 volumes. Early issues of the Memoirs often were dedicated to taxonomic monographs and revisions by a single author, but more recent issues usually have presented discussions of topics by a collaboration of authors. Volume 26 was the first to be published in association with another botanical society, the Long Island Botanical Society. It is entitled Tidal Marshes of Long Island, New York and provides an overview of the current state of these marshes and their management practices.

=== Head Editors ===
Below is a list of all individuals who have served as Editor, Editor-in-Chief or Chairman during the publishing history of the Torrey Botanical Society from 1870 until the present day. Each head editor's name is followed by their tenure. Note that some names appear twice.

Editor Name	
William Henry Leggett	(1870–1882)
William Ruggles Gerard*	(1884–1885)
Elizabeth Gertrude Britton	(1886–1888)
Nathaniel Lord Britton	(1889–1897)
Lucien M. Underwood	(1897–1903)
John Hendley Barnhart	(1904–1907)
Marshall Avery Howe	(1908–1910)
Philip Dowell	(1911–1912)
Edward Lyman Morris	(1913–1913)
Alexander William Evans	(1914–1923)
Herbert McKenzie Denslow	(1924–1924)
Tracy Elliot Hazen	(1925–1931)
Bernard Ogilvie Dodge	(1932–1934)
Mintin Asbury Chrysler	(1935–1938)
Roger Philip Wodehouse	(1939–1940)
Harold W. Rickett	(1941–1949)
Charles A. Berger	(1950–1959)
James E. Gunckel	(1960–1962)
Murray Fife Buell	(1963–1969)
Gily E. Bard	(1970–1975)
H. David Hammond	(1976–1981)
James E. Gunckel	(1983–1987)
H. David Hammond	(1988–1992)
Stewart Ware	(1993–1997)
Beverly Collins	(1998–2002)
Brian C. MacCarthy	(2002–2013)
Ryan W. McEwan	(2014–2021)
Carolyn Copenheaver	(2021-present)

- (Presumably acting head editor from Leggett's death in 1882 until his official appointment.)

== Activities ==
- TBS Lectures run from October through May at the New York Botanical Garden and Brooklyn Botanic Garden and are free and open to the public.
- TBS field trips run from April through October throughout New York City and surrounding environs and are free and open to the public.

== Fellowships and awards ==
The Torrey Botanical Society offers several awards each year in support of graduate student botanical research, undergraduate and graduate student botanical training, and the dissemination of knowledge through symposia. These are competitive awards and membership in the Society is required in order to apply. Applications are judged by a committee of the Council of the Society, and recipients are announced before 1 April each year. The Torrey Botanical Society has four award categories: Graduate Student Research Fellowship (three awards: $2,500, $1,500, and $1,000), Andrew M. Greller Graduate Student Research Award for Conservation of Local Flora and Ecosystems ($1,000), Undergraduate and Graduate Student Training Fellowship ($1,000), and the Symposium Award ($1,000).
