= Shûtai Okamura =

Japanese bryologist (1877-1947)

Shûtai Okamura (1877-1947) was a Japanese bryologist, noted for his identification of over 80 species.

== Works ==
- Okamura, Shûtai (1915). Contributiones novae ad floram bryophyton Japonicam (in Latin). Tokyo : The University.
- Okamura, Shûtai (1911). "Neue Beiträge zur Moosflora Japans. III". Botanical Magazine (in German).
- Okamura, Shutai (1915). "Über einigen Arten von Bryophyten aus gewissen Seeboden in Japan. (Der zweite Bericht.)". Shokubutsugaku Zasshi. 29 (346): 334–337. doi:10.15281/jplantres1887.29.346_334.

The standard author abbreviation S.Okamura is used to indicate this person as the author when citing a botanical name.
