= Unclejackia =

Scientific classification
- Kingdom: Plantae
- Division: Bryophyta
- Class: Bryopsida
- Subclass: Bryidae
- Order: Hypnales
- Family: Brachytheciaceae
- Genus: Unclejackia; M.S.Ignatov, T.J.Koponen & D.H.Norris, 1999

Genus of mosses

Unclejackia is a genus of mosses belonging to the family Brachytheciaceae.

The species of this genus are found in Indonesia. The genus was named for Jack Sharp by botanist Daniel H. Norris.

There are two species:

- Unclejackia crispifolia Ignatov, T.Koponen & Norris, 1999
- Unclejackia longisetula Ignatov, T.Koponen & Norris, 1999
