= Wild Flower Preservation Society =

American non-profit organization

- Formation: 1925; 101 years ago
- Dissolved: 1972; 54 years ago
- Type: Non-profit organization
- Purpose: Plant conservation
- Region served: United States

The Wild Flower Preservation Society was an American non-profit organization dedicated to the conservation of native plants.

== History ==
The Wild Flower Preservation Society was organized in 1925 in Washington, D.C., under the direction of Percy L. Ricker. It was a successor to the Wild Flower Preservation Society of America, established in 1902 and dissolved in 1933. Objectives of the Society included the establishment of wild flower preserves, cultivation of rare plants, and promoting the appreciation of nature via exhibits, lectures, and other educational programs. The organization produced leaflets for teachers and students; responded to requests for information about wild flower cultivation and conservation; and published its quarterly journal Wild Flower through the Cincinnati chapter. From 1928 to 1933, Wild Flower was edited by E. Lucy Braun. A collection of 8000 photographs of plants from across the country was assembled.

The Society ceased to exist in 1965 and was formally dissolved in 1972. The organization's records and collection of photographs were acquired by the New York Botanical Garden.

== Bibliography ==
- Stuckey, Ronald L. (1997). "Emma Lucy Braun (1889–1971)". In Grinstein, Louise S.; Biermann, Carol A.; Rose, Rose K. (eds.). Women in the Biological Sciences: A Biobibliographic Sourcebook. Westport, CT: Greenwood Press. pp. 44–50. ISBN 978-0-313-29180-7.
