= American Bryological and Lichenological Society =

Botanical organization

- Founded: 1898
- Founder: Elizabeth Gertrude Britton, Abel Joel Grout
- Type: Professional society
- Members: 625
- Website: http://www.abls.org/
- Formerly called: Sullivant Moss Society

The American Bryological and Lichenological Society is an organization devoted to the scientific study of all aspects of the biology of bryophytes and lichen-forming fungi and is one of the nation's oldest botanical organizations. It was originally known as the Sullivant Moss Society, named after William Starling Sullivant. The Society publishes a quarterly journal distributed worldwide, The Bryologist, which includes articles on all aspects of the biology of mosses, hornworts, liverworts and lichens. The Society also publishes the quarterly journal Evansia, which is intended for both amateurs and professionals in bryology and lichenology and is focused on North America.

== History ==
The Society was founded in 1898, and was first known as the Sullivant Moss Chapter. It was founded by Elizabeth Gertrude Britton and Abel Joel Grout as a chapter of the Agassiz Association. The organization was established soon after the first publication of The Bryologist, which evolved from a serial started by Grout in collaboration with Willard Nelson Clute. There were 34 founding members, including Britton, Clute, Grout and Annie Morrill Smith. Smith was a central figure in the organization in the early years, contributing much time, energy, and money. She was editor or associate editor of The Bryologist for ten years. In 1899, the chapter ended their affiliation with the Agassiz Association and was renamed the Sullivant Moss Society.

The Lichen Department was established within the Society in 1902. Carolyn Wilson Harris lead the department initially, with George Knox Merrill taking over from 1905 to 1916.

The Society maintains an active exchange program. The Moss Exchange was started by Inez M. Haring in 1935.

In 1970, William Louis Culberson oversaw the change of the name of the organization to the American Bryological and Lichenological Society.

== Other notable members ==
- André Aptroot, lichenologist
- Margaret Sibella Brown, bryologist
- Lucy Mary Cavanagh, bryologist
- Cora Huidekoper Clarke, bryologist
- Carroll William Dodge, lichenologist
- Margaret Hannah Fulford, bryologist
- Caroline Coventry Haynes, bryologist
- Daniel Howard Norris, bryologist
- Shûtai Okamura, bryologist
- Stephen C. Sillett, botanist

== See also ==
- Botanical Society of America
- Phycological Society of America
