= Hazen (name) =

Hazen is both a surname and a given name. Notable people with the name include:

Surname:

- Allen Hazen (1869–1930), American engineer
- Chester Hazen (1924–1900), American businessman and politician
- John Douglas Hazen (1860–1937), Canadian politician
- Lee Hazen (1905-1991), American bridge player
- Mick Hazen (born 1993), American actor
- Mike Hazen (born 1976), Executive vice-president and general manager of the Arizona Diamondbacks of MLB
- Moses Hazen (1733–1802), American general
- Robert Leonard Hazen (1808–1874), Canadian politician
- Robert M. Hazen (1948), American mineralogist and astrobiologist
- Tracy Elliot Hazen (1874–1943), American phycologist
- William Babcock Hazen (1830–1887), American general

Given name:

- Hazen Argue (1921–1991), Canadian politician
- Hazen "Kiki" Cuyler (1898-1950), Major League Baseball player
- Hazen S. Pingree (1840–1901), Detroit mayor and Michigan governor

== See also ==
- Marcella Hazan
