= Kathleen King =

Irish botanist (1893–1978)

A.L. Kathleen King
- Born: 5 July 1893; Dublin, Ireland
- Died: 28 March 1978 (aged 84); Dublin, Ireland
- Known for: Work on Irish Bryophytes
- Scientific career
- Fields: Botany, Bryology

A.L. Kathleen King (1893–1978) was an Irish botanist and one of Ireland's leading field bryologists.

== Life ==
King was born Anastasia Lelia Catherine Murphy in Dublin on 5 July 1893, the daughter of Lawrence and Bridget Murphy (née Monaghan). Her father had a drapery business in Lower Baggot Street, with the family living in Upper Merrion Street. King attended Loreto College, St Stephens Green where she had a particular interest in music and drama, playing the cello. She went on to a Berlin finishing school, where she learnt German. Upon returning to Dublin, she acted for a short period in the Abbey Theatre. In 1918 she married Edward Thomas King, a dispensary doctor. Edward died in 1933, leaving Kathleen to raise four sons. King died on 28 March 1978, in her home in Mount Merrion, County Dublin.

== Botanical work ==
King's interest in botany began with growing fruit and vegetables in her garden, more for financial reasons due to becoming a widow. Around this time she joined the Irish Roadside Trees Association, which was concerned with the placement of trees and pavement planting, as she was living in a newly established housing estate in Mount Merrion. King contributed to Maurice Fitzpatrick's Roadside trees in town and country in 1947 along with geologist Anthony Farrington, botanist Mrs Augustine Henry, and Harold Leask. She joined the Society of Irish Foresters and the Dublin Naturalists Field Club, both of which expanded her interest in nature and botany.

King developed an interest in non-flowering plants (cryptogams), but particularly Bryophytes (mosses and liverworts) which spurred her to purchase a microscope and join the British Bryological Society in 1949. The distribution of mosses was her main interest, and over the course of 20 years she travelled the country searching for new species records for this previously understudied group. All of which she accomplished without a car or being able to drive. Her ability to read German aided her in reading much of the work being done by contemporaries in Europe. King's work expanded the knowledge of Irish moss and liverwort distribution, publishing her findings in the Irish Naturalists' Journal and the Transactions of the British Bryological Society. A more unusual finding of King was Meesia tristicha, a sub-arctic zone moss, which she identified in 1957 in Bellacorick, County Mayo. Until then this moss had only been known as a sub-fossil in the United Kingdom. The final paper she published in 1970 added 39 new Irish records of bryophytes. King was one of the five botanists who compiled the 1961 Supplement to Colgan's Flora of the County Dublin.

Due to her expert knowledge of bryophytes, many universities would consult with her in moss identification, and she worked with Bord na Móna on the examination of the ecology of bog sites. King was a member of many societies, including the Royal Dublin Society, An Taisce serving as honorary secretary 1958–64, the Dublin Naturalists Field Club as president 1955–6 and vice-president 1957–8, and the Geographical Society of Ireland. She was also elected an honorary member of the British Bryological Society.

King's herbarium contained over 4000 specimens, mostly from Ireland, but with some specimens from Britain and Europe. She donated the collection to the National Botanic Gardens, Glasnevin in 1977, when her eyesight began to fail. The collection is considered the most important addition of bryophytes since the early 1900s.

== Selected publications ==
- King, G. L. Kathleen (1950). "Brachythecium caespitosum Dixon in Co. Cavan". The Irish Naturalists' Journal. 10 (1). Irish Naturalists' Journal Ltd.: 21. ISSN 0021-1311. JSTOR 25533820.
- King, A. L. Kathleen (1970). "Recent Additions to the Irish Bryophyte Census Lists". The Irish Naturalists' Journal. 16 (11). Irish Naturalists' Journal Ltd.: 350–351. ISSN 0021-1311. JSTOR 25537435.
