= Mary S. Taylor =

American bryologist (1885–1976)

Mary Agnes Stump Taylor (1885–1976) was an American bryologist who collected and identified many species of bryophytes across North America. Her collection of around 8,000 plants was so extensive that it has been used to identify the range of plants several decades after their original collection. The standard author abbreviation M.S.Taylor is used to indicate this person as the author when citing a botanical name.

== Works ==
- Taylor, Mary S. (August 1939). "A Study of Nardia Lescurii". The Bryologist. 42 (4): 85–106. doi:10.2307/3239807. JSTOR 3239807.
- Taylor, Mary S.; Coker, W. C. (28 October 1938). "Filmy Ferns in the Carolinas". Science. 88 (2287): 402. doi:10.1126/science.88.2287.402. ISSN 0036-8075. PMID 17807704.
