= Wild Flower Preservation Society of America =

- Formation: 1902; 124 years ago
- Dissolved: 1933; 93 years ago
- Type: Non-profit organization
- Purpose: Plant conservation
- Region served: United States

The Wild Flower Preservation Society of America is a defunct American non-profit organization dedicated to the conservation of native plants.

== History ==
The Wild Flower Preservation Society of America was organized in 1902, using funds from a gift of $3000 from Olivia Stokes and Caroline Phelps Stokes to the New York Botanical Garden. The first meeting was held on April 23, 1902; Frederick Vernon Coville was elected president, Charles Louis Pollard was elected secretary, and Elizabeth Gertrude Britton was elected to the Board of Managers. Other members of the board included Charles Edwin Bessey, Liberty Hyde Bailey, William Trelease, Charles Frederick Millspaugh, and Alice Eastwood. The Society established numerous local chapters. It was incorporated in the state of New York in 1915.

For a time, the Society published The Plant World, a journal that began publication in 1897.

By 1924, the scope of this formerly national organization was limited to New York.

== Bibliography ==
- Gager, C. Stuart (June 1940). "Elizabeth G. Britton And The Movement For The Preservation Of Native American Wild Flowers". Journal of the New York Botanical Garden. 41 (486): 137–142.
- Howe, Marshall A. (May 1934). "Elizabeth Gertrude Britton". Journal of the New York Botanical Garden. 35 (413): 97–103.
