= Hazen, Jefferson County, Pennsylvania =

Unincorporated community in Pennsylvania, U.S.

Coordinates: 41.20760°N 78.97036°W

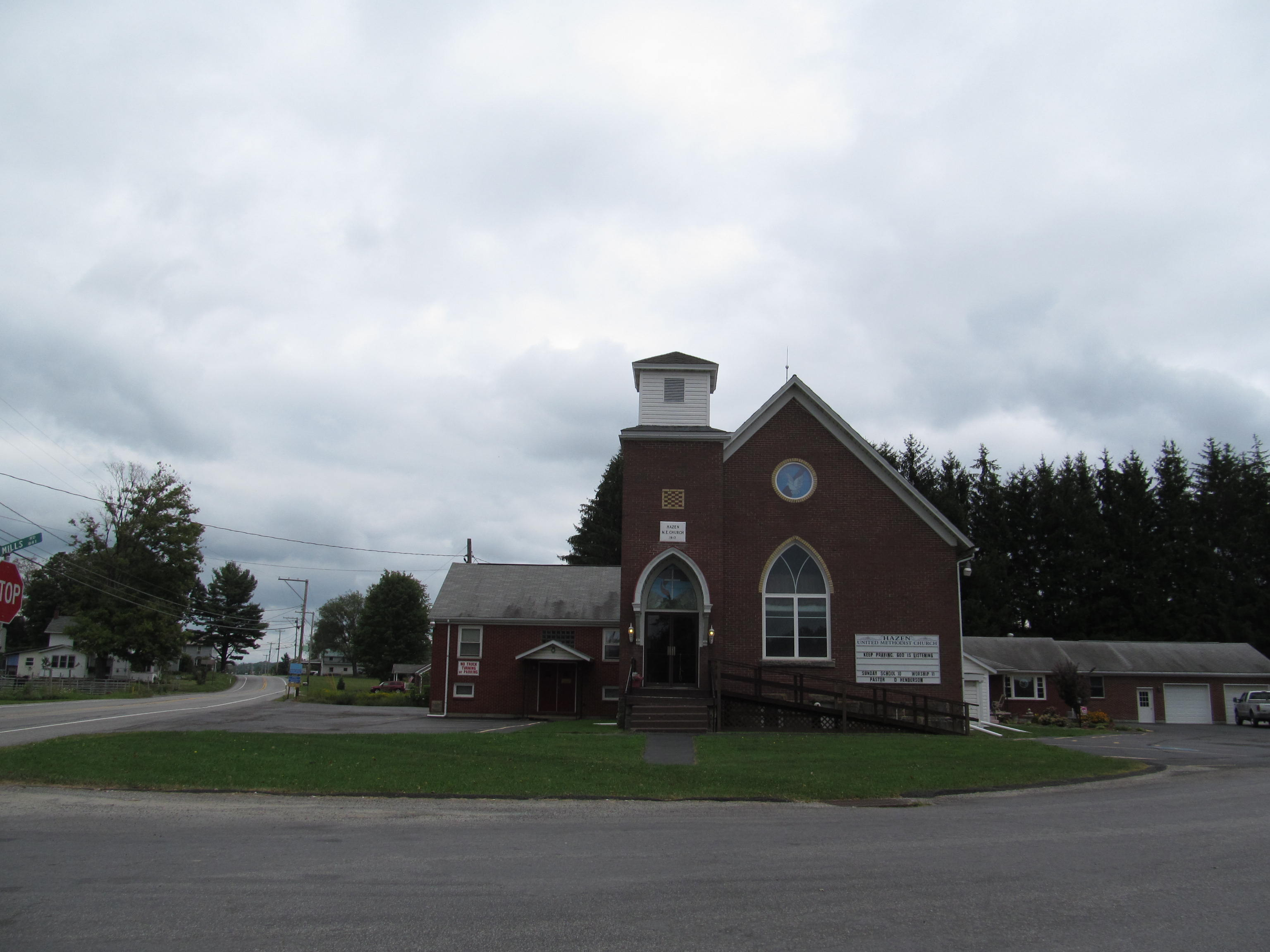

Hazen is an unincorporated community in Jefferson County, in the U.S. state of Pennsylvania.

== History ==
Hazen was originally called Maysville, and named for John Mayes, the owner of a local store. The present name of Hazen was adopted when the post office was established. A post office opened at Hazen in 1882, and was operated until it was discontinued in 1982.
