= Margaret Hannah Fulford =

American botanist

- Born: June 14, 1904; Cincinnati, Ohio, US
- Died: November 28, 1999 (aged 95); Cincinnati, Ohio, US
- Education: University of Cincinnati; Yale University.
- Scientific career
- Fields: Botany
- Workplaces: University of Cincinnati; University of Michigan Biological Station
- Doctoral advisor: Alexander William Evans
- Other academic advisors: Emma Lucy Braun
- Author abbrev. (botany): Fulford

Margaret Hannah Fulford (June 14, 1904 – November 28, 1999) was an American bryologist who was active in identifying the flora of North and South America. The standard author abbreviation Fulford is used to indicate this person as the author when citing a botanical name.

== Biography ==
Fulford was born on June 14, 1904, in Cincinnati, Ohio. She subsequently attended the University of Cincinnati. She earned her BA in botany in 1926, BE in education in 1927, and returned for her MA in botany working under Emma Lucy Braun in 1928. She then attended Yale University to obtain her doctorate under Alexander William Evans, which she accomplished in 1935. Meanwhile, she worked at the University of Cincinnati as a botany instructor from 1927 to 1940. She became assistant professor in 1940, associate professor in 1946, professor in 1954, and professor emerita in 1974. She remained with the university until her death.

Fulford's focus was on morphology, ecology, and systematics of leafy hepatics. She intensely studied the reproduction and life cycle of the Hepaticae. She was a leading member of the Sullivant Moss Society, and was curator of the group's hepatics herbarium. Fulford was also a prominent bryology instructor at the University of Michigan Biological Station.

Fulford's work was published in journals such as The Bryologist, American Midland Naturalist, Ohio Journal of Science, Annales Bryologici, Lloydia, Torreya, Revue Bryologie et Lichenologique, and the Bulletin of the Torrey Botanical Club. Throughout her career, she published over 70 scholarly articles.

=== Legacy ===
The Margaret H. Fulford Herbarium at the University of Cincinnati was founded by her in the early 1920s, for which she remained as curator for most of her career. Her personal collection of liverworts is housed within the herbarium.

In 1992, botanist Stephan Robbert Gradstein published Fulfordianthus, which is a genus of liverworts in the family Lejeuneaceae. It is found in central and southern America, and named in Fulford's honour.
