= Daniel H. Norris =

American botanist

- Born: 1933; Toledo, Ohio
- Died: September 30, 2017 (aged 83–84)
- Alma mater: Michigan State University University of Tennessee
- Known for: Bryology
- Scientific career
- Fields: Botany
- Institutions: Humboldt State University University of California, Berkeley
- Doctoral advisor: Jack Sharp
- Author abbrev. (botany): D.H.Norris

Daniel Howard Norris (1933 – September 30, 2017) was an American botanist dedicated to the study of mosses and was a renowned expert on the California bryoflora. The standard author abbreviation D.H.Norris is used to indicate this person as the author when citing a botanical name.

== Career ==
Norris received his B.S. in botany from Michigan State University in 1954. In 1964, he obtained his Ph.D. from the University of Tennessee in botany, advised by Jack Sharp. While there, he was a member of Sigma Xi. Norris became a professor of botany at Humboldt State University in 1967. Between 1984 and 1985, Norris was a Fulbright Research Scholar at the University of Helsinki. In 1990, Norris was awarded with an honorary Ph.D. by the University of Helsinki. After his retirement in 1991, he transferred his extensive bryological collection to the University of California, Berkeley to continue his research.

Throughout his lifetime, Norris collected about 116,000 bryophyte specimens. His main areas of focus were on California and Papua New Guinea, however, he made major collections on every continent other than Antarctica.

Norris described four moss genera as new to science; Bryolawtonia, Orthothuidium, Stoneobryum, and Unclejackia. He has also authored or co-authored the following new species: Anomobryum hyalinum, Amomobryum ochii, Brachymenium wabagense, Brachymenium huonii, Bryum pseudoblandum, Dicranella papua-palustris, Dicranum cutlackii, Didymodon coffeatus, Didymodon wisselii, Diphyscium chiapense, Hampeella concavifolia, Hyophila streimannii, Leptocladiella flagellaris, Macrocoma gastonyi, Merrilliobryum tanianum, Microdus friedensis, Orthotrichum kellmanii, Orthotrichum shevockii, Orthotrichum spjutii, Oxystegus crassicostatus, Plagiomnium cordatum, Powellia parvula, Rhamphidium novoguineensis, Splachnobryum limbatum, Stereophyllum dicksonii, Syrrhopodon curticancellinatus, and Trematodon papuensis.

== Legacy ==
Norris is the namesake of two genera: Bryonorrisia and Timodania; 1 flowering plant species: Brongniartia norrisii; and 12 bryophyte species: Aphanolejeunea norrisii, Codriophorus norrisii, Didymodon norrisii, Lepicolea norrisii, Macromitrium norrisianum, Orthotrichum norrisii, Pogonatum norrisii, Radula norrisii, Scopelophila norrisii, Trematodon norrisii, Orthotrichum norrisii, and Trematodon norrisii.

The daylily cultivar Hemerocallis 'Daniel Howard Norris' also bears his name.

== Selected publications ==
- Koponen, T. & Norris, D. H. 1983: Bryophyte flora of the Huon Peninsula, Papua New Guinea. I. Study area and its bryological exploration. – Ann. Bot. Fennici 20: 15-29.
- Norris, D. H. 1997: The Oregon-California border: Important in Bryogeography. – J. Hattori Bot. Lab. 82: 185-189.
- Norris, D. H. 2003: A conversation about mosses, liverworts and hornworts. – Fremontia 31: 5-11.
- Norris, D.H. & Shevock, J.R. 2004: Contributions toward a bryoflora of California: I. A specimen-based catalogue of mosses. – Madroño 51: 1-131.
- Norris, D.H. & Shevock, J.R. 2004: Contributions toward a bryoflora of California: II. A key to the mosses. – Madroño 51: 131-269.
- Norris, D.H., Koponen, T. & Buck, W.R. 2008: Bryophyte flora of the Huon Peninsula, Papua New Guinea. LXXI. Merrilliobryum (Myriniaceae, Musci. Ann. Bot. Fennici 45: 269-276.
