= Lucy Mary Cavanagh =

American botanist (1871–1936)

Lucy Mary Cavanagh (1871–1936) was an American botanist and plant collector, noted for her identification of several species of bryophytes. The standard author abbreviation Cavanagh is used to indicate this person as the author when citing a botanical name.She was born April 17, 1871, in Iowa City and died in Clinton County, Iowa, US.

== Education and career ==
Lucy Mary Cavanagh graduated the University of Iowa in 1896 with a Bachelors of Science degree. While working on her degree, she taught in Iowa City public schools. In 1902 she became an associate member of the Iowa Academy of Science and continued membership until her death. She became Herbarium Assistant in Botany at Iowa state University in 1907. In 1911, she became Assistant Curator of the Herbarium, holding that position until her death.

== Works ==
- Cavanagh, Lucy M. (1919). The mosses of Iowa, an exological and taxonomic study. University of Iowa. p. 1928.
- Cavanagh, Lucy M. (1929). "Mosses New to Iowa". The Bryologist. 32 (6): 112–113. doi:10.2307/3238695. JSTOR 3238695.
