= Hazen High School =

Hazen High School may refer to:

- Hazen High School (Arkansas), located in Hazen, Arkansas
- Hazen High School (North Dakota), located in Hazen, North Dakota
- Hazen High School (Washington), located in Renton, Washington
- Hazen Union School, located in Hardwick, Vermont
