= Tracy Elliot Hazen =

American botanist and author

Tracy Elliot Hazen (July 4, 1874 – March 16, 1943) was an American botanist and author specializing in the study of fresh water algae.

== Works ==
- Hazen, Tracy Elliot (1899). The life history of Sphaerella lacustris (Haemtococcus pluvialis). Torrey Botanical Club.
- Hazen, Tracy Elliot (1902). The Ulothricaceae and Chaetophoraceae of the United States. The Club.
- Hazen, Tracy Elliot; Hazen, Robert; Jacobus, Donald Lines (1947). The Hazen family in America, a genealogy by Tracy Elliot Hazen, PH. D. R. Hazen.
