= Alexander William Evans =

American botanist (1868–1959)

- Alexander W. Evans, photographed by Ivan Mackenzie Lamb
- Born: May 17, 1868; Buffalo, New York
- Died: December 6, 1959 (aged 91)
- Education: Yale University
- Scientific career
- Fields: Botany
- Workplaces: Yale University
- Doctoral students: George Elwood Nichols; Margaret Hannah Fulford
- Author abbrev. (botany): A.Evans

Alexander William Evans (May 17, 1868 – December 6, 1959) was a botanist, bryologist, and mycologist that specialized in the flora of Connecticut.

== Early life ==
Born in Buffalo, New York on May 17, 1868, Evan's family moved to New Haven, Connecticut after the death of his father. After graduation from Hillhouse High School, Evans received his Ph.B. from the Sheffield Scientific School at Yale University in 1890. An excellent student, Evans was among the top of his class. Two years later, Evans earned his M.D. from the Yale School of Medicine. After a two-year internship at the Yale-New Haven Hospital, he went to the University of Berlin to briefly study botany under Leopold Kny.

== Career ==
After the death of Daniel Cady Eaton, Evans returned to Yale as a botanical instructor. He became assistant professor in 1901 before being promoted to full professorship in 1906. In 1912, Evans was elected vice president of the Botanical Society of America. Evans served as the editor-in-chief of the Bulletin of Torrey Botanical Club from 1914 to 1924, and also served as associate editor for The Bryologist. He became a member of the British Bryological Society in 1934. He retired as a professor in 1936, but remained at Yale as an emeritus. In 1947, Yale awarded Evans an honorary Sc.D degree.

Throughout his lifetime, Evans authored 165 research papers, many of which were self illustrated. His research was mostly focused on the Hepaticae, but he also had special interest in the lichens, specifically the genus Cladonia. Later in life, Evans became enraptured by Yasuhiko Asahina's work on the microchemical methods of lichen, which he believed he could apply to taxonomy.

The standard author abbreviation A.Evans is used to indicate this person as the author when citing a botanical name.

== Legacy ==
Evans described 8 new genera and 130 new species of liverworts. Many of his specimens are held in the Yale Herbarium, dating back to 1888. A list of Evans' publications on lichens is given in Mason Hale's 1960 summary of his lichenological work.

== Selected publications ==
- Evans, A. W. (1898). The Hawaiian Hepaticae of the Tribe Jubuloideae. The Academy.
- Evans, A. W. and G. E. Nichols (1908). The Bryophytes of Connecticut. Conn. Geol. & Nat. Hist. Surv., Bull. 11: 1–203.
- Evans, A. W. and G. E. Nichols (1935). The liverwort flora of the Upper Michigan Peninsula. The Bryologist 38: 81–91. doi:10.2307/3239361
