= Elizabeth Gertrude Britton =

American botanist (1858–1934)

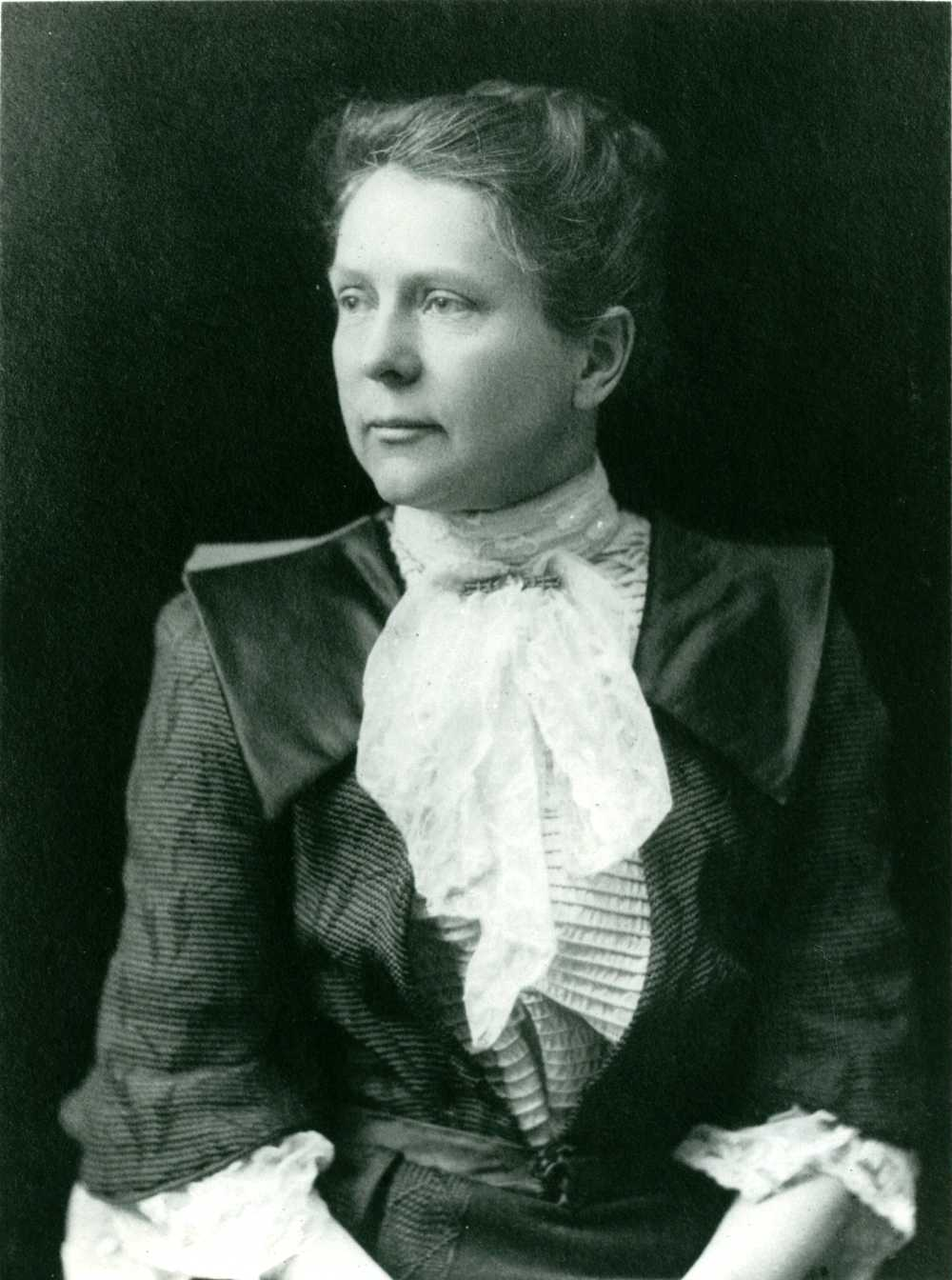
- Born: January 9, 1858; New York City, U.S.
- Died: February 25, 1934 (aged 76); The Bronx, New York, U.S.
- Education: Hunter College
- Spouse: Nathaniel Lord Britton
- Scientific career
- Fields: Botany, Bryology
- Author abbrev. (botany): E.Britton

Elizabeth Gertrude Britton (née Knight) (January 9, 1858 – February 25, 1934) was an American botanist, bryologist, and educator. She and her husband, Nathaniel Lord Britton, played a significant role in the fundraising and creation of the New York Botanical Garden. She was a co-founder of the precursor body to the American Bryological and Lichenological Society. She was an activist for the protection of wildflowers, inspiring local chapter activities and the passage of legislation. Elizabeth Britton made major contributions to the literature of mosses, publishing 170 papers in that field.

== Early life and family ==
Elizabeth Gertrude Knight was born on January 9, 1858, in New York City, one of five daughters, to James and Sophie Anne (née Compton) Knight. Her family operated a furniture factory and sugar plantation in the vicinity of Matanzas, Cuba, and she spent much of her childhood there. In later childhood, she attended a private school in New York before attending Normal College (later, Hunter College). She graduated from Normal College in 1875, at the early age of seventeen. On August 27, 1885, she married Nathaniel Lord Britton, an assistant in geology at Columbia College who shared her growing interest in botany. The couple had no children.

== Career ==
After graduation in 1875, Elizabeth Knight joined the staff of Normal College as a critic teacher. She joined the Torrey Botanical Club in 1879, and in 1881 she published her first scientific paper in that organization's Bulletin, reporting observations of unexpected white flowers in two species of plants. She also observed the presence of a curlygrass fern, Schizaea pusilla, in Nova Scotia. In 1883, she became a tutor in natural science. It was at this time that she began to specialize in bryology and her first paper concerning mosses appeared. Britton collected fertile specimens of Eustichium norvegicum in Wisconsin and wrote the first description of its fruits. Although known since 1827, the plant had hitherto been known only in a sterile condition. Her Observer articles were models of popular scientific writings on plants which had "fanciful" titles like "The Humpbacked Elves" and "The Brownies".

After her marriage in 1885, Britton resigned her teaching position at Normal College, and took charge of the moss collections at Columbia in an unofficial, unpaid capacity. She served as editor of the Bulletin of the Torrey Botanical Club from 1886 to 1888; in 1889, she published the first of an eleven-part series of papers titled Contributions to American Bryology in that journal. Her catalogue of the mosses of West Virginia appeared in 1892, and the first of eight articles titled How to Study the Mosses for a popular magazine was published in 1894. These papers "sufficed to place Mrs. Britton in command of the bryological field in America." She worked with her husband to acquire for Columbia the moss herbarium of August Jaeger of Switzerland; Britton persuaded wealthy friends to contribute the necessary $6,000.

Britton, along with her husband, was one of the Torrey Botanical Club members who spurred the establishment of the New York Botanical Garden (NYBG). The couple also travelled to England in 1888 where Nathaniel was performing research at the Royal Botanic Gardens, Kew. At Kew Nathaniel worked on the Bolivian botanical collections of Henry Hurd Rusby, a gift to Columbia; meanwhile, Elizabeth worked on mosses at the Linnean Society of London.

Inspired by the quality and quantity of Kew's herbarium, library, and gardens, the couple set about organizing an institution of comparable stature for New York. A Club meeting was held in October 1888 where rich and prominent citizens were recruited as incorporators. The Botanical Garden was established by act of the state legislature in 1891. Britton was important in the efforts to raise funds for the organization in the 1890s. Her husband became the first director of the Botanical Garden in 1896, whilst she volunteered there. It was largely through her interest that the collection of liverworts and mosses of William Mitten was acquired for the NYBG in 1906. In recognition of her service, Britton was named Honorary Curator of the Mosses in 1912, a post which she held until her death.

Britton enumerated the ferns in the Rusby collection in 1888 and she published her examination of the Rusby mosses in 1896.

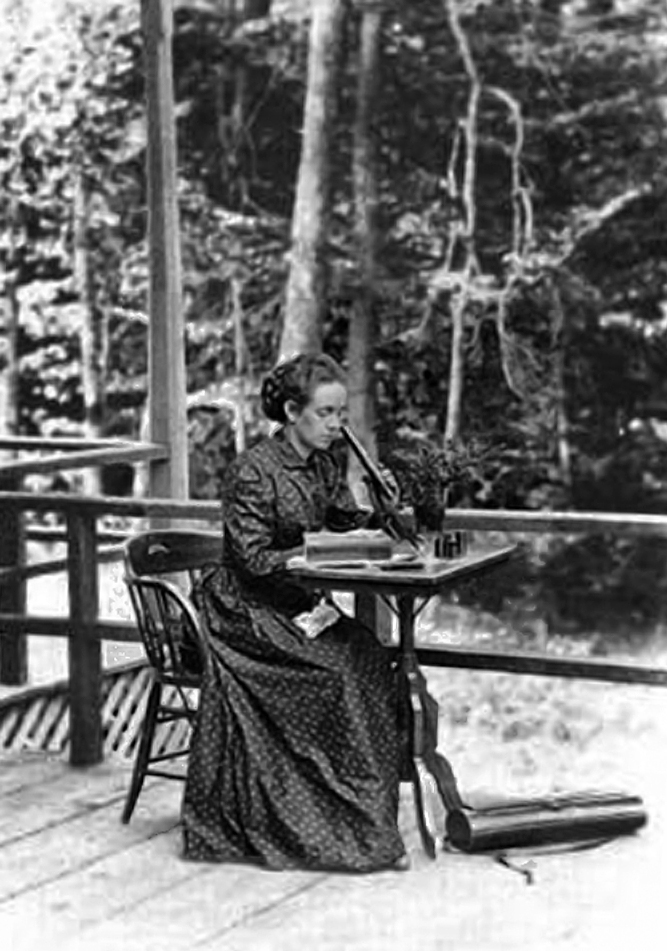
Britton using a microscope, 1886

Britton traveled to various locations in the United States to collect botanical specimens, including the Great Dismal Swamp, the Adirondack Mountains, and the mountains of North Carolina. She accompanied Nathaniel on 23 of the 25 trips he made to the islands of the Caribbean and West Indies. Under her own name, she published her findings in the Bulletin in 1913–1915. Britton wrote the chapters concerning mosses for Nathaniel's Flora of Bermuda and The Bahama Flora.

Britton worked with organizations to promote the study of mosses, especially by women scientists, and she chaired the division of Bryophyta for the (Women's) National Science Club (NWSC) in 1897.

As part of her unofficial position at Columbia, Britton acted as advisor to doctoral students, including James Franklin Collins and Abel Joel Grout. Together, in 1898 Grout and Britton founded the Sullivant Moss Chapter of the Agassiz Association. By 1908, it was known as the Sullivant Moss Society (and after 1949, as the American Bryological and Lichenological Society). Although relations between the two researchers later became chilly, Britton continued to participate in the Society, contributing articles to The Bryologist, its journal, and serving as its president from 1916 to 1919.

Britton continued to study plants other than mosses. She published A Revision of the North American Species of Ophioglossum, the adder's-tongue ferns, in 1897. With Delia West Marble, she collected the type specimen of Thelypteris brittonae, a species of maiden fern, in 1906. Britton collected the type specimen for the orchid now named Britton's shadow witch (Ponthieva brittoniae).

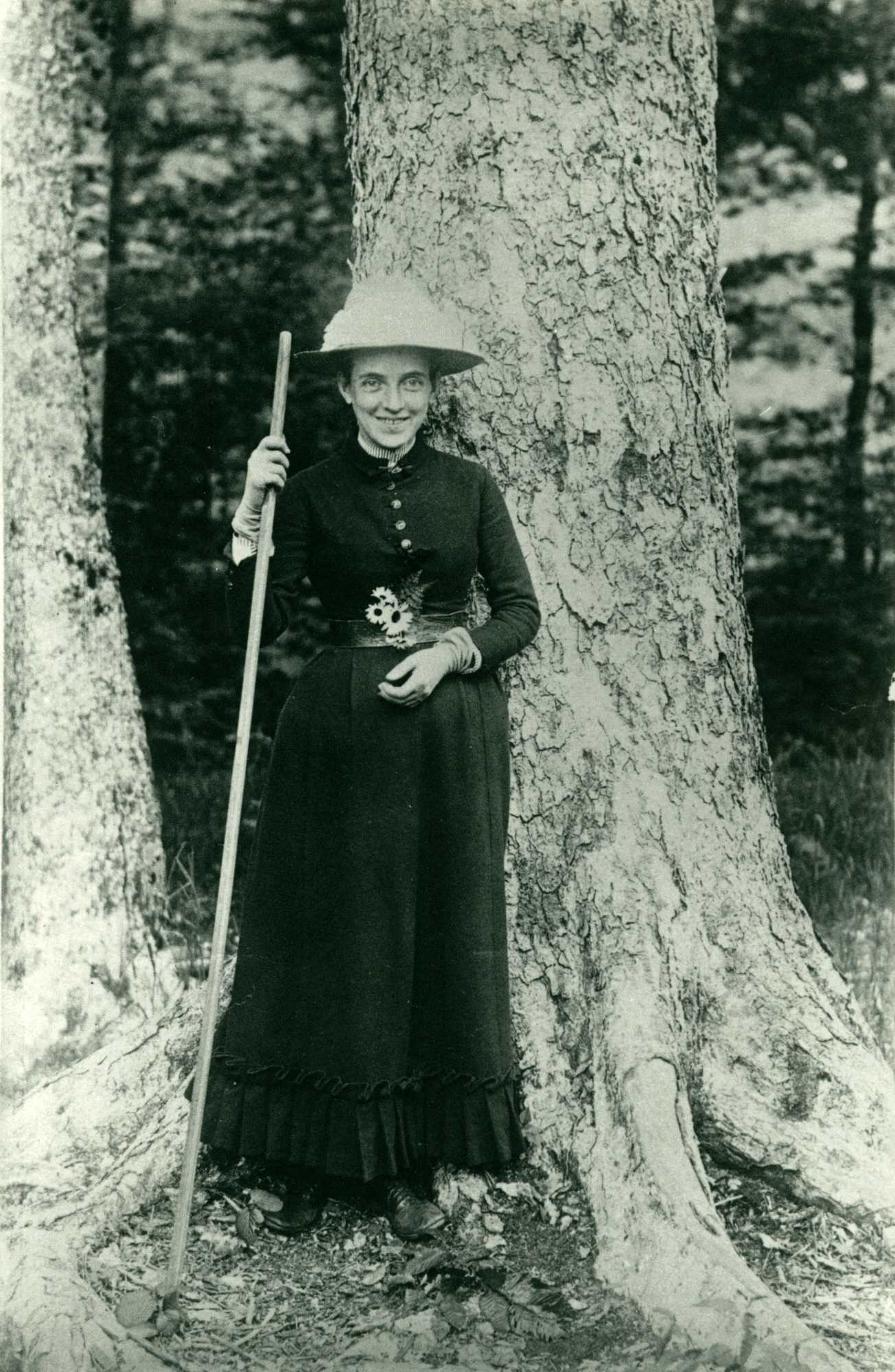
Britton standing in front of a tree

In the first decade of the 20th century, Britton began to devote her time to the conservation of wildflowers. A gift of $3,000 by Olivia and Caroline Phelps Stokes to the NYBG spurred the creation of the Wild Flower Preservation Society of America. The first meeting was held on April 23, 1902, where Frederick Vernon Coville was elected president, Charles Louis Pollard was elected secretary, and Britton was elected to the Board of Managers. Other members of the board included Charles Edwin Bessey, Liberty Hyde Bailey, William Trelease, Charles Frederick Millspaugh, and Alice Eastwood. Britton went on to serve as secretary and treasurer of the organization. The Society established numerous local chapters, with a membership largely of women. It was incorporated in the state of New York in 1915. Soon, tensions between field botanists (many of them women) and those with academic affiliations (many of them men), as well as disagreements over centralizing leadership on policy questions (specifically, addressing the growing number of automobiles on the road) led to its reorganization as the Wild Flower Preservation Society in 1925, with Percy L. Ricker as its head.

Nevertheless, Britton continued to promote the cause for nearly 35 years, by publishing, lecturing, and conducting correspondence; her efforts led to adoption of legislation in various states, as well as local conservation activities in garden clubs and public schools. She published fourteen short articles in the NYBG's Journal under the series title of Wild Plants Needing Protection. The series of articles gives evidence of Britton writing in an accessible, non-technical register, such as the introduction of "Wild Pink" (Silene caroliniana):

Before the trees cast much shade, while their greens are still so exquisitely fresh and varied, a bright flash of color will attract the eye to the Wild Pink, growing in hilly places on rocks or often in their cracks and crevices with the Saxifrage.

In 1925, as chair of the conservation committee of the Federated Garden Clubs of New York State, Britton successfully led a boycott campaign against the common practice of harvesting wild American holly for use as a Christmas decoration. As a substitute, she promoted the propagation of the plant by cuttings for commercial use.

All told, during the period 1881 to 1930, Britton published 346 papers, of which 170 dealt with mosses. She wrote descriptions of six families of mosses for the New York Botanical Garden's Flora of America. Marshall Avery Howe described Britton as "a woman of extraordinary physical and mental energy—the possessor of a remarkably quick and brilliant intellect. She has left an enduring record in the literature of science, and her well-directed activities have had an outstanding influence in the conservation of the native flora of the United States."

== Recognition and legacy ==
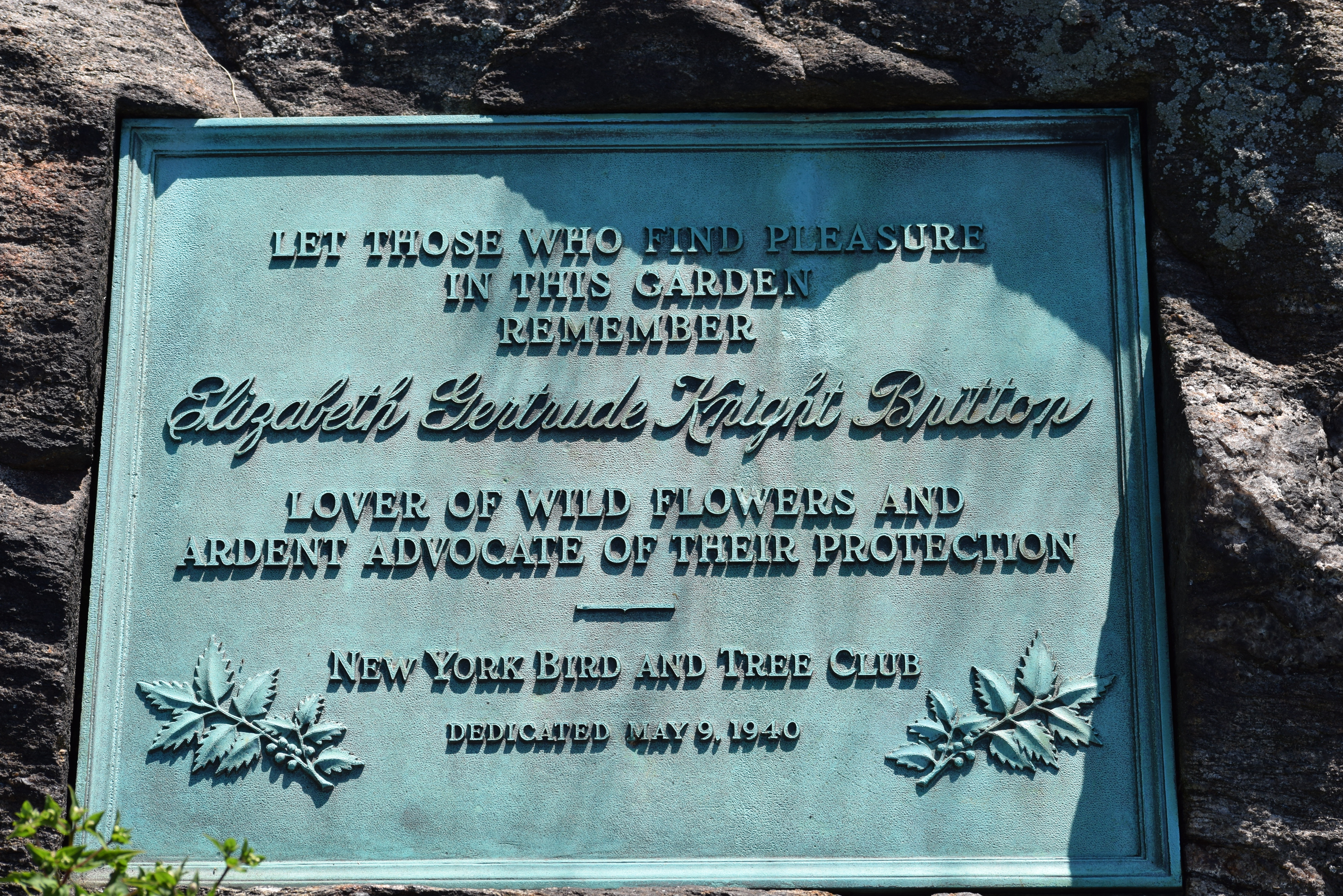
Plaque placed in honor of Elizabeth Gertrude Knight Britton on the grounds of the New York Botanical Garden.

In 1893, Britton was the only woman among the 25 scientists nominated for charter membership in the Botanical Society of America. In 1905, she was one of three bryologists appointed to the nomenclature committee that would report to the 1910 meeting of the International Botanical Congress in Brussels. In 1906, Britton was one of only nineteen women listed in the first edition of American Men of Science. Her entry was marked with an asterisk: this "starred" listing was limited to the top 1,000 scientists in the book, as determined by the editors. Britton was starred in the five editions of the book that appeared through 1933.

The moss genus Bryobrittonia is named for Elizabeth Britton, as well as fifteen species of plants and one of animals.

Mount Britton, a double peak in El Yunque National Forest in Puerto Rico, honors both of the Brittons.

In 1940, a memorial plaque in honor of Britton was installed in the new Wild Flower Garden of the New York Botanical Garden. A gift of the New York Bird and Tree Club, it is mounted on a ten-ton boulder of Bronx schist, and its text reads, "Let those who find pleasure in this garden remember Elizabeth Gertrude Knight Britton, lover of wildflowers and ardent advocate of their protection". The garden is now known as the Native Plant Garden, and the boulder as Britton Rock.

Today, the Elizabeth Gertrude Knight Britton archive is held by the NYBG Mertz Library. It includes personal papers, manuscripts and published research, artwork and photographs, and printing plates. The archive documents Britton's teaching career at Normal College, as well as her participation in the Torrey Botanical Club and the NYBG. Her field notebooks can be found in the New York Botanical Garden Collectors' Field Notebook collection.

The character of Alma Whittaker in the 2013 novel The Signature of All Things, by Elizabeth Gilbert, is modeled in part on Britton.

== Later life and death ==
Elizabeth Britton died at her home at 2965 Decatur Avenue in The Bronx on February 25, 1934, following an apoplectic stroke; her husband Nathaniel survived her for four months. Although she was nominally a member of the Episcopalian faith, she was buried in the Moravian Cemetery on Staten Island, where her husband's ancestors had been early settlers and he held property.

== Selected publications ==
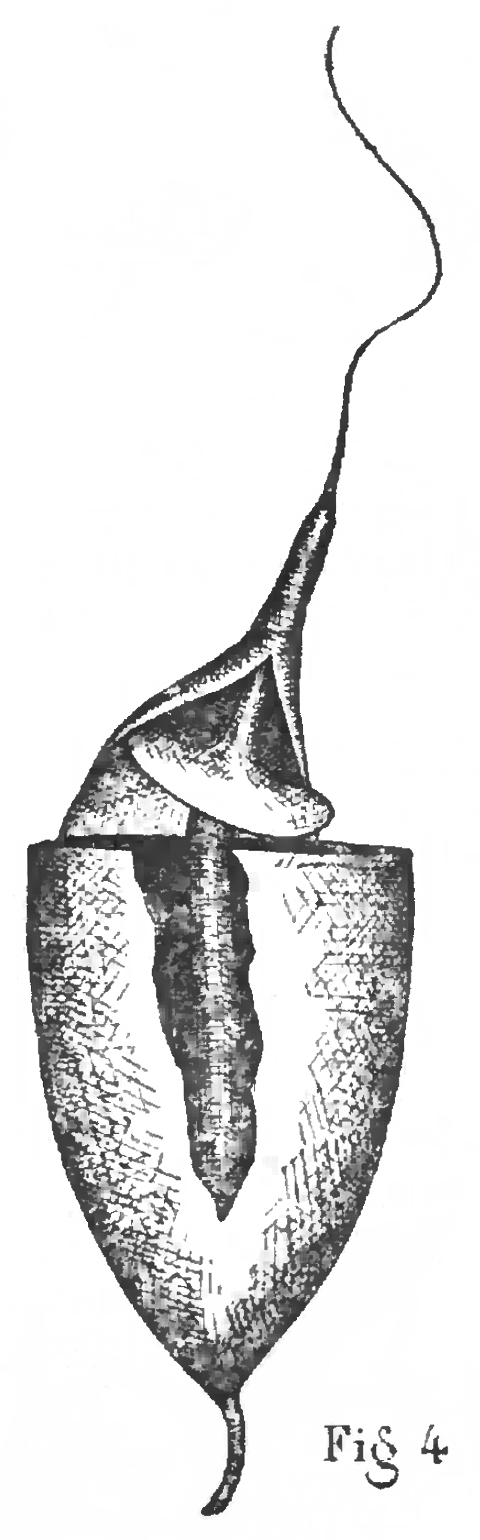
Eustichium norvegicum: Calyptra and columella seen through a natural rupture in the wall of the capsule.

- Knight, Elizabeth G. (September 1883). "On the Fruit of Eustichium norvegicum, Br. Eu". Bulletin of the Torrey Botanical Club. 10 (9): 99–100. doi:10.2307/2477462. JSTOR 2477462.
- Britton, Elizabeth G. (October 3, 1888). "An Enumeration of the Plants Collected by Dr. H. H. Rusby in South America. 1885–1886.–III. Pteridophyta". Bulletin of the Torrey Botanical Club. 15 (9): 247–253. doi:10.2307/2476529. JSTOR 2476529.
- Britton, Elizabeth G. (April 8, 1889). "Contributions to American Bryology.–I. An Enumeration of Mosses Collected by Mr. John B. Leiberg, in Kootenai Co., Idaho". Bulletin of the Torrey Botanical Club. 16 (4): 106–112. doi:10.2307/2476940. JSTOR 2476940.
- Britton, Elizabeth G. (February 12, 1891). "Contributions to American Bryology.–II. A Supplementary Enumeration of the Mosses Collected by Mr. John B. Leiberg in Idaho, with Descriptions of two new Species". Bulletin of the Torrey Botanical Club. 18 (2): 49–56. doi:10.2307/2475524. JSTOR 2475524.
- Britton, Elizabeth G. (1892). "West Virginia Mosses". Contributions from the Herbarium of Columbia College (32).
- Britton, Elizabeth G. (October 20, 1893). "Contributions to American Bryology, III. Notes on the North American Species of Orthotrichum". Bulletin of the Torrey Botanical Club. 20 (10): 393–405. doi:10.2307/2475738. JSTOR 2475738.
- Britton, Elizabeth G. (January 25, 1894). "Contributions to American Bryology, IV. Notes on the North American Species of Orthotrichum–II". Bulletin of the Torrey Botanical Club. 21 (1): 1–15. doi:10.2307/2478029. JSTOR 2478029.
- Britton, Elizabeth G. (February 20, 1894). "Contributions to American Bryology, V. Notes on the North American Species of Weissia (Ulota)". Bulletin of the Torrey Botanical Club. 21 (2): 65–76. doi:10.2307/2485350. JSTOR 2485350.
- Britton, Elizabeth G. (March 1894). "How to Study the Mosses. I." The Observer. Vol. 5, no. 3. pp. 82–86.
- Britton, Elizabeth G. (April 1894). "How to Study the Mosses. II". The Observer. Vol. 5, no. 4. pp. 114–120.
- Britton, Elizabeth G. (April 25, 1894). "Contributions to American Bryology–VI. I. Western Species of Orthotrichum. Supplementary Notes on the North American Species of Weissia (Ulota)". Bulletin of the Torrey Botanical Club. 21 (4): 137–160. doi:10.2307/2996894. JSTOR 2996894.
- Britton, Elizabeth G. (May 1894). "How to Study the Mosses. III". The Observer. Vol. 5, no. 5. pp. 151–157.
- Britton, Elizabeth G. (May 25, 1894). "Contributions to American Bryology.–VII. A Revision of the Genus Physcomitrium, with Descriptions of Five New Species". Bulletin of the Torrey Botanical Club. 21 (5): 189–208. doi:10.2307/2477962. JSTOR 2477962.
- Britton, Elizabeth G. (June 1894). "How to Study the Mosses, IV". The Observer. Vol. 5, no. 6. pp. 180–186.
- Britton, Elizabeth G. (July 1894). "How to Study the Mosses, V." The Observer. Vol. 5, no. 7. pp. 215–219.
- Britton, Elizabeth G. (August 1894). "How to Study the Mosses, VI". The Observer. Vol. 5, no. 8. pp. 246–251.
- Britton, Elizabeth G. (August 20, 1894). "Contributions to American Bryology.–VIII. A Revision of the Genus Bruchia, with Descriptions of Types, and One New Species". Bulletin of the Torrey Botanical Club. 21 (8): 343–372. doi:10.2307/2477992. JSTOR 2477992.
- Britton, Elizabeth G. (October 1894). "How to Study the Mosses. VII". The Observer. Vol. 5, no. 10. pp. 306–311.
- Britton, Elizabeth G. (January 15, 1895). "Contributions to American Bryology.–IX. A Revision of the Genus Scouleria with Description of One New Species". Bulletin of the Torrey Botanical Club. 22 (1): 36–43. doi:10.2307/2485404. JSTOR 2485404.
- Britton, Elizabeth G. (February 1895). "How to Study the Mosses. VIII". The Observer. Vol. 6, no. 2. pp. 17–21.
- Britton, Elizabeth G. (February 26, 1895). "Contributions to American Bryology–IX. [sic] I. The Systematic Position of Physcomitrella patens. 2. On a Hybrid Growing with Aphanorhegma serrata Sull. 3. On a European Hybrid of Physcomitrella patens". Bulletin of the Torrey Botanical Club. 22 (2): 62–68. doi:10.2307/2478381. JSTOR 2478381.
- Britton, Elizabeth G. (November 30, 1895). "Contribution [sic] to American Bryology–XI. 1. Coscinodon raui and Coscinodon renauldi. 2. Dicranella heteromalla and Its Varieties. 3. Notes on the Genus Leersia, Hedw". Bulletin of the Torrey Botanical Club. 22 (11): 447–458. doi:10.2307/2996679. JSTOR 2996679.
- Britton, Elizabeth G. (December 28, 1896). "An Enumeration of the Plants Collected by H. H. Rusby in Bolivia, 1885–1886.–II. Musci". Bulletin of the Torrey Botanical Club. 23 (12): 471–499. doi:10.2307/2477840. JSTOR 2477840.
- Britton, Elizabeth G. (December 30, 1897). "A Revision of the North American Species of Ophioglossum". Bulletin of the Torrey Botanical Club. 24 (12): 545–559. doi:10.2307/2478289. hdl:2027/hvd.32044106360456. JSTOR 2478289.
- Britton, Elizabeth G. (1912–1929). Wild Plants Needing Protection. New York, NY: New York Botanical Garden. Reprint of 14 articles from the Journal of the New York Botanical Garden.
- Andrews, Albert LeRoy; Britton, Elizabeth Gertrude; Emerson, Julia Titus (1913), "Sphagnales-Bryales", North American Flora, vol. 15, New York, NY: New York Botanical Garden, pp. 1–75. Reprinted 1961.
- Britton, Elizabeth Gertrude (December 1913). "West Indian Mosses–I". Bulletin of the Torrey Botanical Club. 40 (12): 653–676. doi:10.2307/2479836. JSTOR 2479836.
- Britton, Elizabeth Gertrude (January 1915). "West Indian Mosses–II. Mosses of the Danish West Indies and Virgin Islands". Bulletin of the Torrey Botanical Club. 42 (1): 1–8. doi:10.2307/2479419. JSTOR 2479419.
- Britton, Elizabeth G. (February 1915). "Mosses of Bermuda". Bulletin of the Torrey Botanical Club. 42 (2): 71–76. doi:10.2307/2479518. JSTOR 2479518.

== See also ==
- The Britton Cottage
- Timeline of women in science

== Bibliography ==
- Anderson, Lewis E. (Spring 2000). "Early History of the American Bryological and Lichenological Society". The Bryologist. 103 (1): 3–14. doi:10.1639/0007-2745(2000)103[0003:ehotab]2.0.co;2. JSTOR 3244275. S2CID 83774247.
- Bonta, Marcia Myers (1991). Women in the Field: America's Pioneering Women Naturalists. College Station, TX: Texas A&M University Press. ISBN 978-0-89096-489-7.
- Britton, Nathaniel Lord (1918). Flora of Bermuda. New York, NY: Charles Scribner's Sons. doi:10.5962/bhl.title.1352.
- Britton, Nathaniel Lord; Millspaugh, Charles Frederick (June 26, 1920). The Bahama Flora. New York, NY. doi:10.5962/bhl.title.2769.
- Gager, C. Stuart (June 1940). "Elizabeth G. Britton And The Movement For The Preservation Of Native American Wild Flowers". Journal of the New York Botanical Garden. 41 (486): 137–142.
- Howe, Marshall A. (May 1934). "Elizabeth Gertrude Britton". Journal of the New York Botanical Garden. 35 (413): 97–103.
- Kass, Lee B. (1997). "Elizabeth Gertrude Knight Britton (1858–1934)". In Grinstein, Louise S.; Biermann, Carol A.; Rose, Rose K. (eds.). Women in the Biological Sciences: A Biobibliographic Sourcebook. Westport, CT: Greenwood Press. pp. 51–61. ISBN 978-0-313-29180-7.
- Slack, Nancy G. (1987), "American Women Botanists: Wives, Widows, and Work", in Abr-Am, Pnina G.; Outram, Dorinda (eds.), Uneasy Careers and Intimate Lives: Women in Science, 1789–1979, Rutgers University Press, pp. 77–103, ISBN 9780813512563
- Steere, William Campbell (1971). "Britton, Elizabeth Gertrude Knight". In James, Edward T.; James, Janet Wilson; Boyer, Paul S. (eds.). Notable American Women, 1607–1950: A Biographical Dictionary. Vol. I. Cambridge, MA: The Belknap Press of Harvard University Press. pp. 243–244.
- Books by and about Elizabeth Gertrude Britton on WorldCat
