= Abel Joel Grout =

American botanist

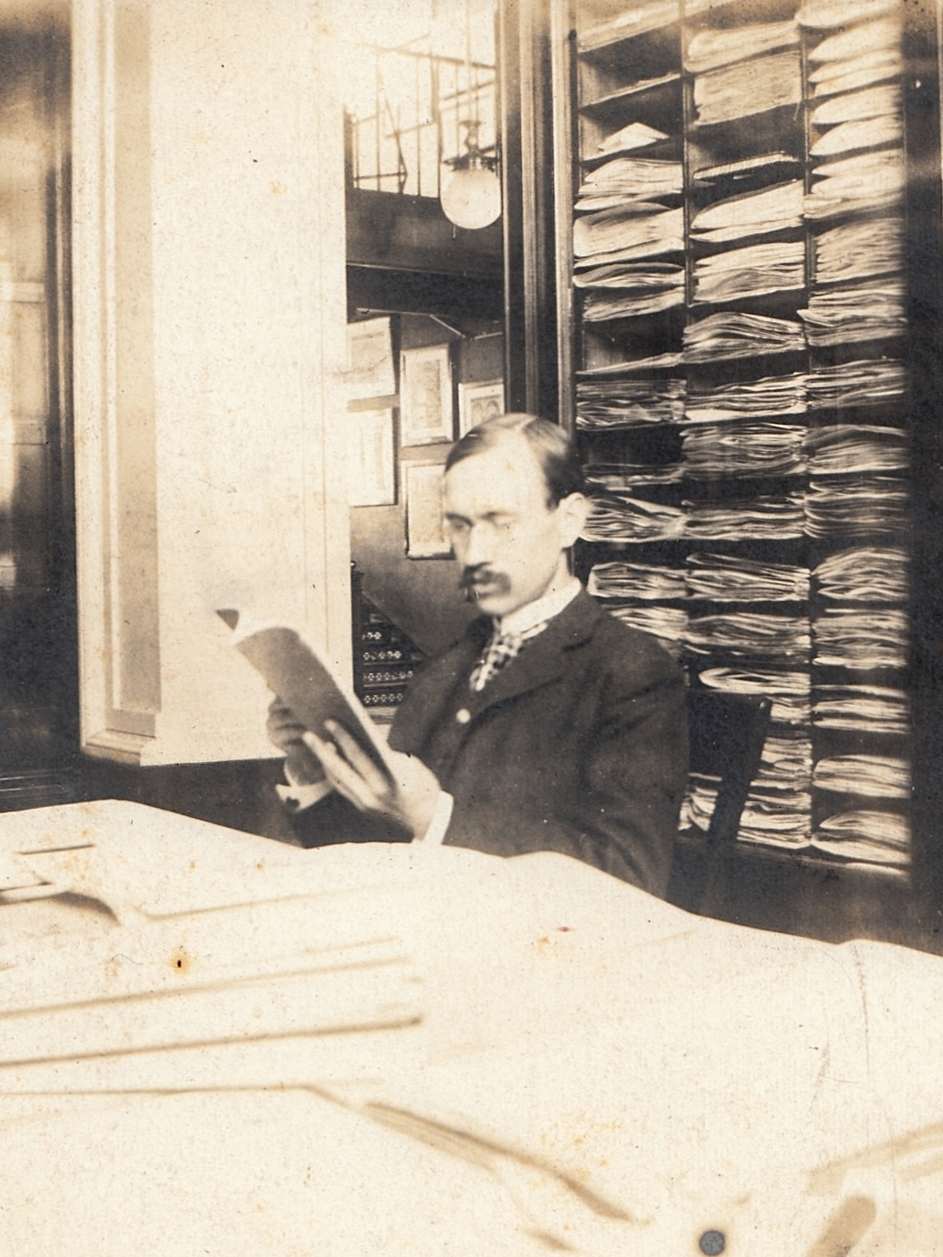
- Dr. A. J. Grout in an herbarium, ca. 1900
- Born: March 24, 1867; Newfane, Vermont, U.S.
- Died: March 27, 1947 (aged 80); East Bradenton, Florida, U.S.
- Education: University of Vermont; Columbia University
- Known for: Bryology
- Scientific career
- Fields: Botany
- Workplaces: Curtis High School; Cold Spring Harbor Laboratory
- Doctoral advisor: Elizabeth Gertrude Britton
- Author abbrev. (botany): Grout

Abel Joel Grout (1867–1947) was an American bryologist, an expert on pleurocarpous mosses, and founding member of the Sullivant Moss Society.

== Biography ==
Grout was born near Newfane, Vermont. In 1890, he received his Bachelor of Philosophy from the University of Vermont, graduating with his childhood friend Marshall Avery Howe. After acquiring his doctorate at Columbia University in 1897, he turned to teaching at various locations. From 1908 to 1930, he taught at Curtis High School in Staten Island. After his retirement, he continued to teach summer bryology courses at the Cold Spring Harbor Laboratory.

His primary focus was mosses, which he developed an interest in during high school. Initially, his doctoral research concerned marine algae under Nathaniel Lord Britton, but he switched to the study of the moss genus Brachythecium under Elizabeth Gertrude Britton.

Together, Grout and Mrs. Britton founded the Sullivant Moss Society, now called the American Bryological and Lichenological Society. He served as the first president of the organization. Grout was also the first editor of The Bryologist, which evolved from a serial started with Willard Nelson Clute. He wrote numerous papers on the topic of mosses.

Grout died in Bradenton, Florida.

== Selected publications ==
- Grout, Abel Joel (1903). Mosses with Hand-lens and Microscope. Published by the author.
- Grout, Abel Joel (1905). Mosses with a Hand-lens. Published by the author.
- Grout, Abel Joel (1916). The Moss Flora of New York City and Vicinity. Published by the author.
- Grout, Abel Joel (1928). Moss flora of North America, north of Mexico, Volume 1.
- Grout, Abel Joel (1933). Moss flora of North America, north of Mexico, Volume 2.

Grout issued four exsiccatae, one with the title North American Musci pleurocarpi.

The standard author abbreviation Grout is used to indicate this person as the author when citing a botanical name.
