= The Bryologist =

- Discipline: Bryology
- Language: English
- Edited by: James Lawrey

Publication details
- History: 1898-present
- Publisher: American Bryological and Lichenological Society (United States)
- Frequency: Quarterly

Standard abbreviations
- ISO 4: Bryologist

Indexing
- ISSN: 0007-2745
- LCCN: 2004-242151
- JSTOR: 00072745
- OCLC no.: 46381487

Links
- Journal homepage

The Bryologist is a peer reviewed scientific journal specializing in bryology. It is published quarterly by the American Bryological and Lichenological Society (ABLS). It began as a department of The Fern Bulletin devoted to the study of North American mosses. Its first editor was Abel Joel Grout, who intended the bulletin to be "enabling any one at all interested in mosses to get some knowledge of these plants without excessive labor or expense ... the editor will also try to identify for subscribers difficult specimens accompanied by notes and return postage."

Subsequent editors have included Lincoln Ware Riddle (from 1911), and James D. Lawrey (from 2012).
