= Marshall Avery Howe =

American botanist and taxonomist

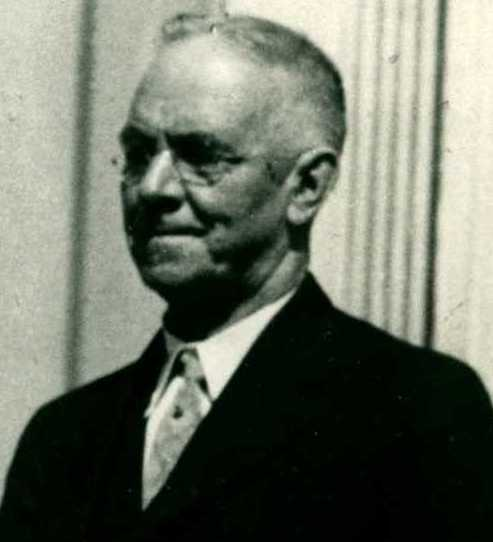
Howe in 1927

Marshall Avery Howe (June 6, 1867-1936) was an American botanist, taxonomist, morphologist, curator and the third director of the New York Botanical Garden. He was born in Newfane, Vermont. He specialized in the study of liverworts (Hepaticae) and algae, and was also an expert on the cultivation of dahlias and other ornamental plants. He was an instructor in cryptogamic botany at the University of California at Berkeley and was appointed curator of the New York Botanical Garden in 1906, and assistant director in 1923, and director in 1935 after the resignation of Elmer Drew Merrill. In collecting for the gardens, he made numerous expeditions collecting algae and liverworts. He was an active member of the "Garden Club" in New York. He served as secretary then president of the Board of Trustees of the Pleasantville Free Library.

Howe edited and distributed two exsiccata-like series Hepaticae Californicae and North American marine algae, collected at San Juan, Puerto Rico and the Great Rogged Islands, Bahamas.
