= Bryology =

Branch of botany concerned with the study of bryophytes

Bryology (from Greek bryon, a moss, a liverwort) is the branch of botany concerned with the scientific study of bryophytes (mosses, liverworts, and hornworts). Bryologists are botanists who have an active interest in observing, recording, classifying or researching bryophytes. The field is often studied along with lichenology due to the similar appearance and ecological niche of the two organisms, even though bryophytes and lichens are not classified in the same kingdom.

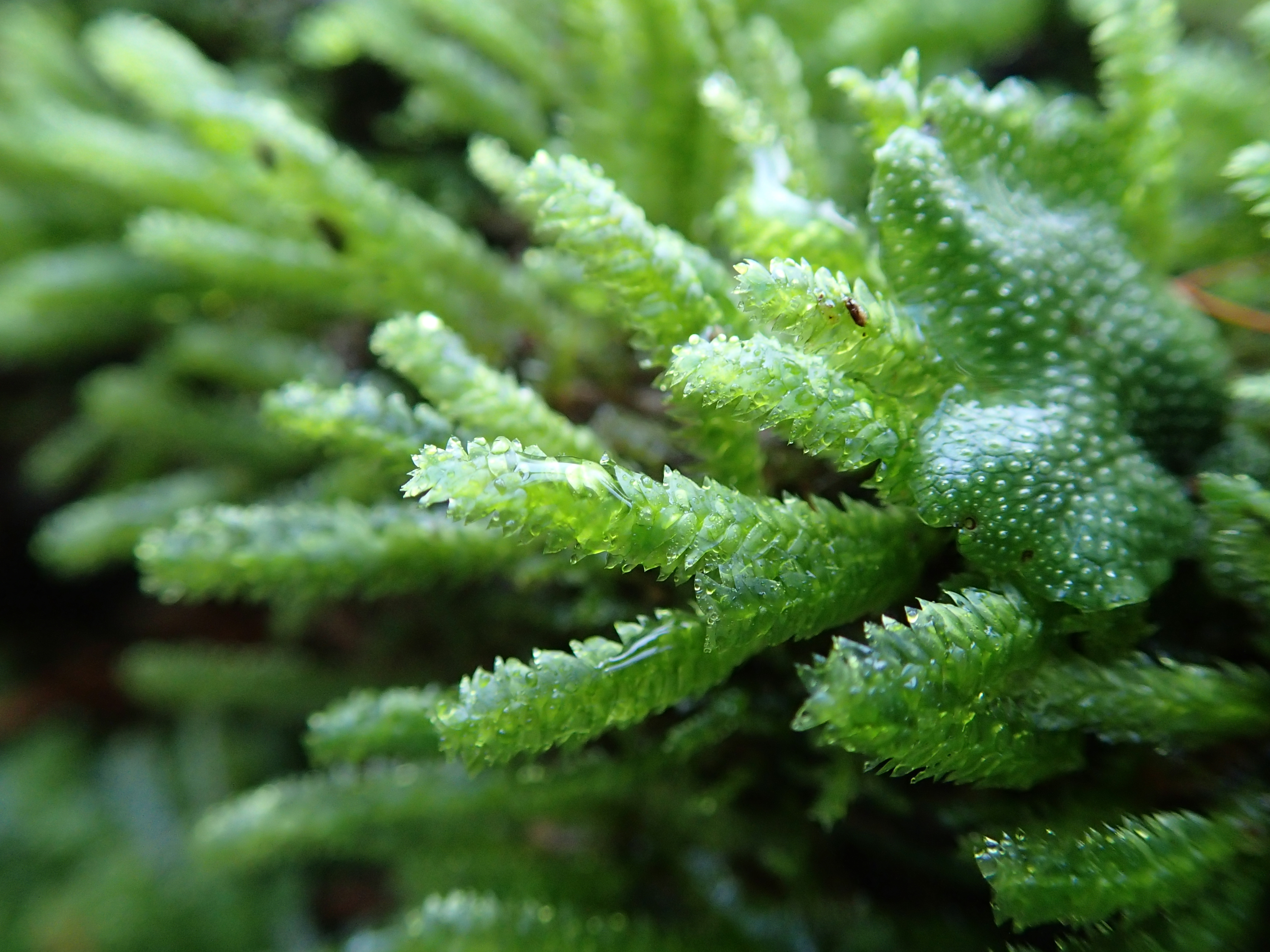
Common bryophytes found in central Japan

== History ==
Bryophytes were first studied in detail in the 18th century. In 1717 the German botanist Johann Jacob Dillenius (1687–1747), later Sherardian Professor of Botany at Oxford from 1734 to 1747, produced the work "Reproduction of the ferns and mosses". The beginning of bryology really belongs to the work of Transylvanian-born Johannes Hedwig (1730–1799), sometimes called the "father of bryology", who clarified the reproductive system of mosses in 1782 in his Fundamentum historiae naturalis muscorum frondosorum and arranged a taxonomy.

== Research ==
Areas of research include bryophyte taxonomy, bryophytes as bioindicators, DNA sequencing, and the interdependency of bryophytes and other plant, fungal and animal species. Among other things, scientists have discovered parasitic (mycoheterotrophic) bryophytes such as Aneura mirabilis (previously known as Cryptothallus mirabilis) and potentially carnivorous liverworts such as Colura zoophaga and Pleurozia.

Centers of research in bryology include the University of Bonn in Germany, the University of Helsinki in Finland and the New York Botanical Garden.

== Journals ==
The Bryologist a scientific journal began publication in 1898, and includes articles on all aspects of the biology of mosses, hornworts, liverworts and lichens and also book reviews. It is published by The American Bryological and Lichenological Society.

The scientific Journal of Bryology, renamed in 1972 from its original name of Transactions of the British Bryological Society that commenced in 1947, is published by the British Bryological Society.

== Recognized bryologists ==
- Miles Joseph Berkeley (1803–1889)
- Elizabeth Gertrude Britton (1858–1934)
- Margaret Sibella Brown (1866–1961)editor
- Agnes Fry (1869–1957/8)
- Heinrich Christian Funck (1771–1839)
- Robert Kaye Greville (1794–1866)
- Wilhelm Theodor Gümbel (1812–1858)
- Inez M. Haring (1875–1968)
- Hiroshi Inoue (1932–1989)
- Kathleen King (1893–1978)
- Aaron John Sharp (1904–1997)
- Mary S. Taylor (1885–1976)
- Frances Elizabeth Tripp (1832–1890)
- Carl Friedrich Warnstorf (1837–1921)
- Nancy Guttmann Slack (1930-2022)
- Noris Salazar Allen (b. 1947)

== Literature ==
- Meylania, Zeitschrift für Bryologie und Lichenologie
- Limprichtia, Zeitschrift der Bryologischen Arbeitsgemeinschaft Deutschlands
