= List of Lejeunea species =

This is a list of binomial names in the genus Lejeunea, with just accepted species and not including synonyms.

The GBIF lists up to 592 species (as of October 2022). The World Flora Online lists up to 1292 results (as of June 2023).

== A ==
- Lejeunea abyssinica (Gola) Cufod.
- Lejeunea acanthogona Spruce
- Lejeunea acanthotis Spruce
- Lejeunea acroloba Mont. ex Steph.
- Lejeunea acuminata (Lehm. & Lindenb.) Gottsche, Lindenb. & Nees
- Lejeunea acuta Mitt.
- Lejeunea acutata (Steph.) Solari
- Lejeunea acutiloba (Hook. & Taylor) Gottsche, Lindenb. & Nees
- Lejeunea adglutinata Taylor
- Lejeunea adpressa Nees
- Lejeunea aethiopica E.W.Jones
- Lejeunea affinis (Lindenb. & Gottsche) Stephani
- Lejeunea alaskana (R.M.Schust. & Steere) Inoue & Steere
- Lejeunea alata Gottsche
- Lejeunea alatiflora (Stephani) Duss
- Lejeunea albescens (Steph.) Mizut.
- Lejeunea albida (Spruce) Stephani
- Lejeunea albiflora Colenso
- Lejeunea aliena Ångström
- Lejeunea aloba Sande Lac.
- Lejeunea alobifolia H.A.Mill.
- Lejeunea aloboidea H.A.Mill. & Bonner
- Lejeunea amaniensis E.W.Jones
- Lejeunea ambigua Lindenb. & Gottsche
- Lejeunea amentulifera Steph.
- Lejeunea amoena Gottsche
- Lejeunea amplectens (Stephani) Stephani
- Lejeunea androgyna R.M.Schust.
- Lejeunea angulifolia Mitt.
- Lejeunea angusta (Lehm. & Lindenb.) Mont.
- Lejeunea angustibracteata V.F.Schiffner
- Lejeunea anisophylla Mont.
- Lejeunea anomala Lindenb. & Gottsche
- Lejeunea antillana Steph.
- Lejeunea aphanes Spruce
- Lejeunea apiahyna (Steph.) Sushil K.Singh
- Lejeunea apiculata Sande Lac.
- Lejeunea aptycta Gottsche
- Lejeunea aquatica Horik.
- Lejeunea arhexia Spruce
- Lejeunea armitii (Steph.) Steph.
- Lejeunea arnelliana R.M.Schust.
- Lejeunea artocarpi Spruce
- Lejeunea asperifolia Steph.
- Lejeunea asperrima Spruce
- Lejeunea asperula (Steph.) Mizut.
- Lejeunea asprella Spruce
- Lejeunea assimilis Lindenb. & Gottsche
- Lejeunea asthenica Spruce
- Lejeunea atheatostipa Spruce ex A.Gepp
- Lejeunea atlantica C.J.Bastos & Gradst.
- Lejeunea autoica R.M.Schust.

== B ==
- Lejeunea baccifera (Taylor) Stephani
- Lejeunea badia Spruce
- Lejeunea balazsii (Pócs) R.M.Schust.
- Lejeunea barbata (Herzog) R.L.Zhu & M.J.Lai
- Lejeunea bermudiana (A.Evans) R.M.Schust.
- Lejeunea bethanica Gottsche
- Lejeunea bidentula Herzog
- Lejeunea biformis Gottsche
- Lejeunea blepharogona Spruce
- Lejeunea blomquistii R.M.Schust.
- Lejeunea boliviensis (Steph.) R.L.Zhu & M.E.Reiner
- Lejeunea bombonasensis Spruce
- Lejeunea boninensis Horik.
- Lejeunea borneensis Stephani
- Lejeunea bornmuelleri (Steph.) M.E.Reiner
- Lejeunea boryana Mont.
- Lejeunea brenanii E.W.Jones
- Lejeunea bukpuiensis Sushil K.Singh
- Lejeunea byssiformis Grolle & Mizut.

== C ==
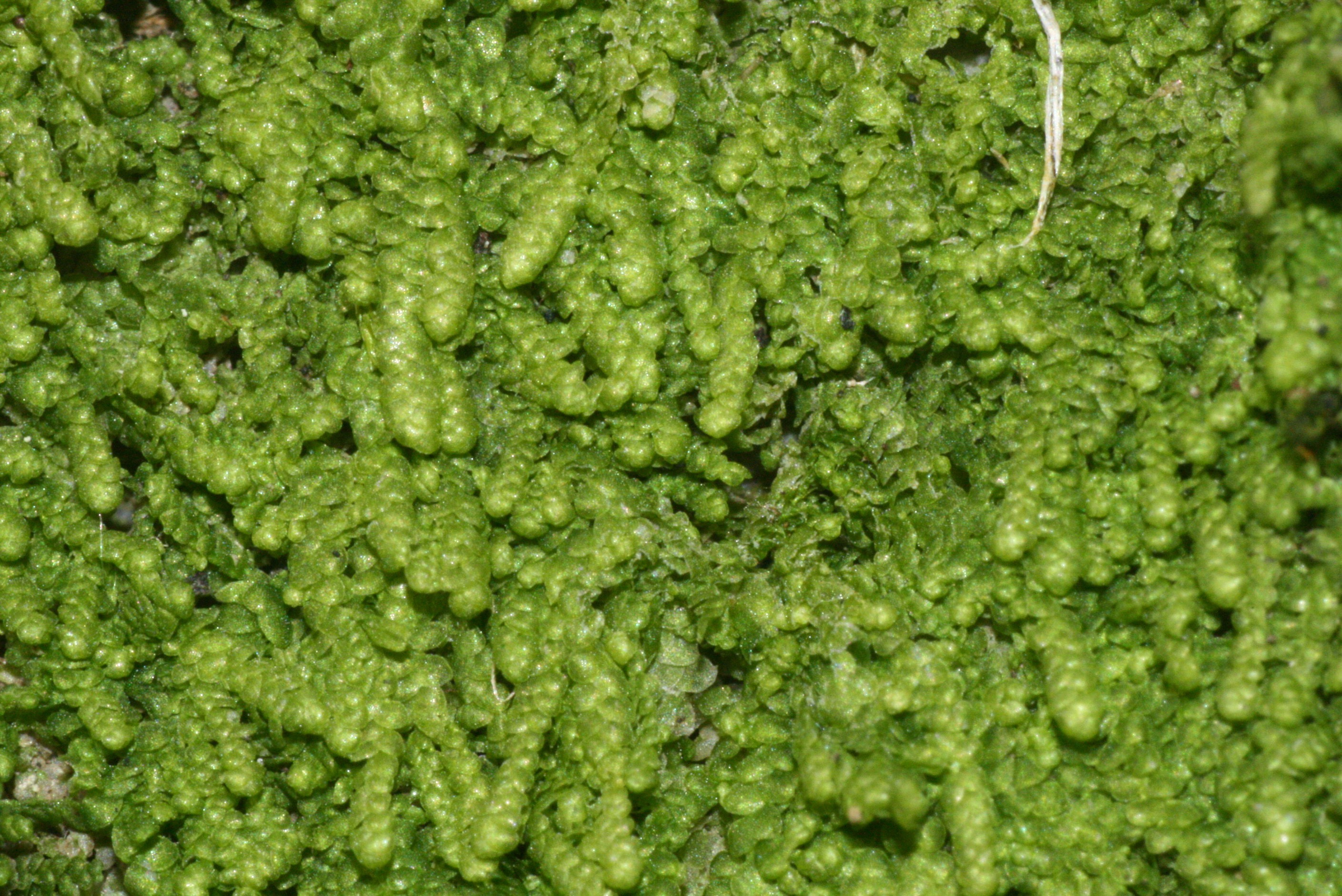
Lejeunea cavifolia

- Lejeunea caespitosa Lindenb.
- Lejeunea calcicola R.M.Schust.
- Lejeunea calyculata Taylor
- Lejeunea camerunensis Stephani
- Lejeunea canariensis (Steph.) Steph.
- Lejeunea cancellata Nees & Mont.
- Lejeunea candida (Pócs) R.M.Schust.
- Lejeunea cantabrigiensis E.W.Jones
- Lejeunea capensis Gottsche
- Lejeunea caracensis Lindenb.
- Lejeunea cardotii Stephani
- Lejeunea caripensis Lindenb. & Gottsche
- Lejeunea carolensis Spruce
- Lejeunea caroliniana Austin
- Lejeunea catanduana (Stephani) H.A.Mill., H.Whittier & B.Whittier
- Lejeunea catinulifera Spruce
- Lejeunea cauapunensis Spruce
- Lejeunea caulicalyx (Steph.) M.E.Reiner & Goda
- Lejeunea cavifolia (Ehrh.) Lindb.
- Lejeunea caviloba (Steph.) Besch.
- Lejeunea cerina (Lehm. & Lindenb.) Lehm. & Lindenb.
- Lejeunea chaishanensis S.H.Lin
- Lejeunea chalmersii (Stephani) Mizut.
- Lejeunea chamissonis Lindenb.
- Lejeunea chiapae X.-L.He
- Lejeunea chiapasana Fulford & Sharp
- Lejeunea chimborazensis Spruce
- Lejeunea chinensis (Herzog) R.L.Zhu & M.L.So
- Lejeunea cladobola Spruce
- Lejeunea cladogyna A.Evans
- Lejeunea clavata Lindenb.
- Lejeunea clavatiflora (J.B.Jack & Steph.) Steph.
- Lejeunea claviflora (Stephani) S.Hatt.
- Lejeunea claviformis Lindenb. ex Steph.
- Lejeunea cochleata Spruce
- Lejeunea cocoes Mitt.
- Lejeunea coffeae Spruce
- Lejeunea colensoana (Steph.) M.A.M.Renner
- Lejeunea combuensis O.S.Moura, Ilk.-Borg. & M.E.Reiner
- Lejeunea commixta Spruce
- Lejeunea compacta (Steph.) Steph.
- Lejeunea compressiuscula (Steph.) G.E.Lee & Heinrichs
- Lejeunea concava Lindenb. & Gottsche
- Lejeunea concinnula Spruce & Steph.
- Lejeunea conformis Nees & Mont.
- Lejeunea confusa E.W.Jones
- Lejeunea connatistipula (Steph.) Steph.
- Lejeunea contracta Mizut.
- Lejeunea controversa Gottsche
- Lejeunea convexiloba M.L.So & R.L.Zhu
- Lejeunea corcovadae (Steph.) Bischl.
- Lejeunea cordiflora Spruce
- Lejeunea cordistipula Lindenb. & Gottsche
- Lejeunea cornutissima (Stephani) Stephani
- Lejeunea corralensis A.Evans
- Lejeunea corynantha Spruce
- Lejeunea crassiretis Mitt.
- Lejeunea crebriflora Spruce
- Lejeunea cristulaeflora (Gottsche ex Stephani) Reiner, Maria Elena & Goda
- Lejeunea cristulata (Steph.) M.E.Reiner & Goda
- Lejeunea cristuliflora (Steph.) M.E.Reiner & Goda
- Lejeunea cuculliflora (Stephani) Mizut.
- Lejeunea cuneiflora Spruce
- Lejeunea curviloba Steph.
- Lejeunea cuspidistipula (Steph.) Steph. ex Watts
- Lejeunea cyanomontana R.M.Schust.
- Lejeunea cyanophora R.M.Schust.
- Lejeunea cyathearum E.W.Jones
- Lejeunea cyathophora Mitt.
- Lejeunea cyrtotis Spruce

== D ==
- Lejeunea debilis (Lehm. & Lindenb.) Nees & Mont.
- Lejeunea decidua Spruce
- Lejeunea densifolia V.F.Schiffner
- Lejeunea dentata Mitt.
- Lejeunea denticalyx (Steph.) Steph.
- Lejeunea denticuspis (Steph.) Mizut.
- Lejeunea denudata (Pearson) J.J.Engel
- Lejeunea deplanata Nees
- Lejeunea devendrae (Sushil K.Singh) P.K.Verma & K.K.Rawat
- Lejeunea diaphana Spruce
- Lejeunea dictyocalyx Spruce
- Lejeunea dimorpha T.Kodama
- Lejeunea dipterocarpa E.W.Jones
- Lejeunea dipterota (Eifrig) G.E.Lee
- Lejeunea discreta Lindenb.
- Lejeunea disjecta Spruce
- Lejeunea diversicornua Stephani
- Lejeunea diversicuspis Spruce
- Lejeunea diversifolia Mitt.
- Lejeunea drehwaldii Heinrichs & Schäf.-Verw.
- Lejeunea drummondii Taylor
- Lejeunea drymophila Spruce
- Lejeunea duncaniae (Sim) M.E.Reiner
- Lejeunea dusenii Stephani

== E ==
- Lejeunea ecarinata (Steph.) J.M.Coult., Barnes & Arthur
- Lejeunea eckloniana Lindenb.
- Lejeunea edentata L.Söderstr.
- Lejeunea eifrigii Mizut.
- Lejeunea elegans Gottsche
- Lejeunea elliottii Spruce
- Lejeunea elongata (Austin) Austin
- Lejeunea elongella Gottsche
- Lejeunea emarginuliflora Gottsche ex Steph.
- Lejeunea ensifolia Spruce
- Lejeunea epibrya Taylor
- Lejeunea epitheta Taylor
- Lejeunea eplicata Stephani
- Lejeunea erostrata Reiner, Maria Elena & Goda
- Lejeunea erysibe Nees & Mont.
- Lejeunea estrellamontana M.A.M.Renner & Pócs
- Lejeunea evansiana Schaf.-Verw.
- Lejeunea exilis (Reinw., Blume & Nees) Grolle
- Lejeunea expansa Stephani

== F ==
- Lejeunea fabroniifolia Spruce
- Lejeunea falcata (Pócs & J.Eggers) Pócs
- Lejeunea fawcettiae D.J.Carr
- Lejeunea fernandeziana S.W.Arnell
- Lejeunea firma Mitt.
- Lejeunea fissistipula (Steph.) Steph.
- Lejeunea flaccida Lindenb. & Gottsche
- Lejeunea flagellaris Spruce
- Lejeunea flagellifera C.J.Bastos, M.E.Reiner & Schäf.-Verw.
- Lejeunea flava (Sw.) Nees
- Lejeunea flavida Mitt.
- Lejeunea flavovirens Ångstr.
- Lejeunea fleischeri (Steph.) Mizut.
- Lejeunea flexuosa Lindenb.
- Lejeunea florida Spruce
- Lejeunea floridana A.Evans
- Lejeunea fulfordiae (Jovet-Ast) R.L.Zhu
- Lejeunea fuliginosa Spruce
- Lejeunea fulva Spruce
- Lejeunea fusagasugana Gottsche

== G ==
- Lejeunea gabrielensis Spruce
- Lejeunea galeata Spruce
- Lejeunea gayana Gottsche
- Lejeunea ghatensis (P.K.Verma & S.C.Srivast.) Sushil K.Singh & Pócs
- Lejeunea gibbiloba (Steph.) H.A.Mill.
- Lejeunea giulianettii (Steph.) G.E.Lee & Heinrichs
- Lejeunea glaucescens Gottsche
- Lejeunea globosiflora (Steph.) Steph.
- Lejeunea gomphocalyx Spruce
- Lejeunea gottscheana Lindenb.
- Lejeunea gracilicaulis Spruce
- Lejeunea gracilis Steph.
- Lejeunea gracillima Mitt.
- Lejeunea gradsteiniana Pócs
- Lejeunea gradsteinii G.E.Lee, Damanhuri & Latiff
- Lejeunea graminicolor Spruce
- Lejeunea grolleana (Bernecker) R.L.Zhu & W.Ye
- Lejeunea grossecristata (Steph.) E.W.Jones
- Lejeunea grossiretis (Steph.) M.E.Reiner & Goda
- Lejeunea grossistipula Steph.
- Lejeunea grossitexta (Steph.) M.E.Reiner & Goda
- Lejeunea grossiuscula Gottsche ex Steph.

== H ==
- Lejeunea hahnii Solari
- Lejeunea haitica Nees & Mont.
- Lejeunea halei H.Rob.
- Lejeunea hamatiloba G.E.Lee, Schäf.-Verw., M.A.M.Renner & Heinrichs
- Lejeunea hampeana Lindenb.
- Lejeunea hawaikiana M.A.M.Renner & de Lange
- Lejeunea hebetata Spruce
- Lejeunea helenae Pearson
- Lejeunea helmsiana (Steph.) Steph.
- Lejeunea hepaticola (Steph.) Steph.
- Lejeunea herminieri (Steph.) R.L.Zhu
- Lejeunea herpestica Spruce
- Lejeunea herzogii Mizut.
- Lejeunea heterocheila Taylor
- Lejeunea heteromorpha Spruce
- Lejeunea heterophylla Sande Lac.
- Lejeunea hibernica Bischl., H.A.Mill. & Bonner ex Grolle
- Lejeunea hieronymii Spruce
- Lejeunea himalayensis (Pande & R.N.Misra) A.E.D.Daniels & P.Daniel
- Lejeunea hobsoniana Lindenb.
- Lejeunea hodgsoniana Grolle ex R.J.Lewington, Bever. & M.A.M.Renner
- Lejeunea howeana Grolle
- Lejeunea hui R.L.Zhu
- Lejeunea humefacta Spruce
- Lejeunea hyalina (Steph.) L.Söderstr. & A.Hagborg
- Lejeunea hygrophila Gottsche
- Lejeunea hylophila Spruce

== I/J ==
- Lejeunea ibadana A.J.Harr. & E.W.Jones
- Lejeunea immersa Spruce
- Lejeunea implexa Spruce
- Lejeunea inchoata Gottsche, Lindenb. & Nees
- Lejeunea increscens Spruce
- Lejeunea indica Udar & U.S.Awasthi
- Lejeunea infestans (Stephani) Mizut.
- Lejeunea inflatiloba (Steph.) H.A.Mill., Bonner & Bischl.
- Lejeunea inflexiloba J.B.Jack & Steph.
- Lejeunea inflexiloba Prantl
- Lejeunea intricata J.B.Jack & Stephani
- Lejeunea isophylla E.W.Jones
- Lejeunea japonica Mitt.
- Lejeunea jardinii Spruce
- Lejeunea javanensis G.E.Lee & Heinrichs
- Lejeunea julacea Steph.
- Lejeunea jungneri (Steph.) Steph.
- Lejeunea juruana Gradst. & M.E.Reiner

== K ==
- Lejeunea kashyapii M.Dey, D.K.Singh & D.Singh
- Lejeunea kegelii Lindenb. & Gottsche
- Lejeunea kilimandjarensis Steph.
- Lejeunea kinabalensis Mizut.
- Lejeunea kinabalicola R.M.Schust.
- Lejeunea kodamae Ikegami & Inoue
- Lejeunea kolasibensis Sushil K.Singh
- Lejeunea konosensis Mizut.
- Lejeunea konratii G.E.Lee & Pócs
- Lejeunea koordersii G.E.Lee & Heinrichs
- Lejeunea koponenii (Pócs & J.Eggers) Pócs
- Lejeunea kudremukhensis Sushil K.Singh & Pócs
- Lejeunea kuerschneriana Pócs

== L ==
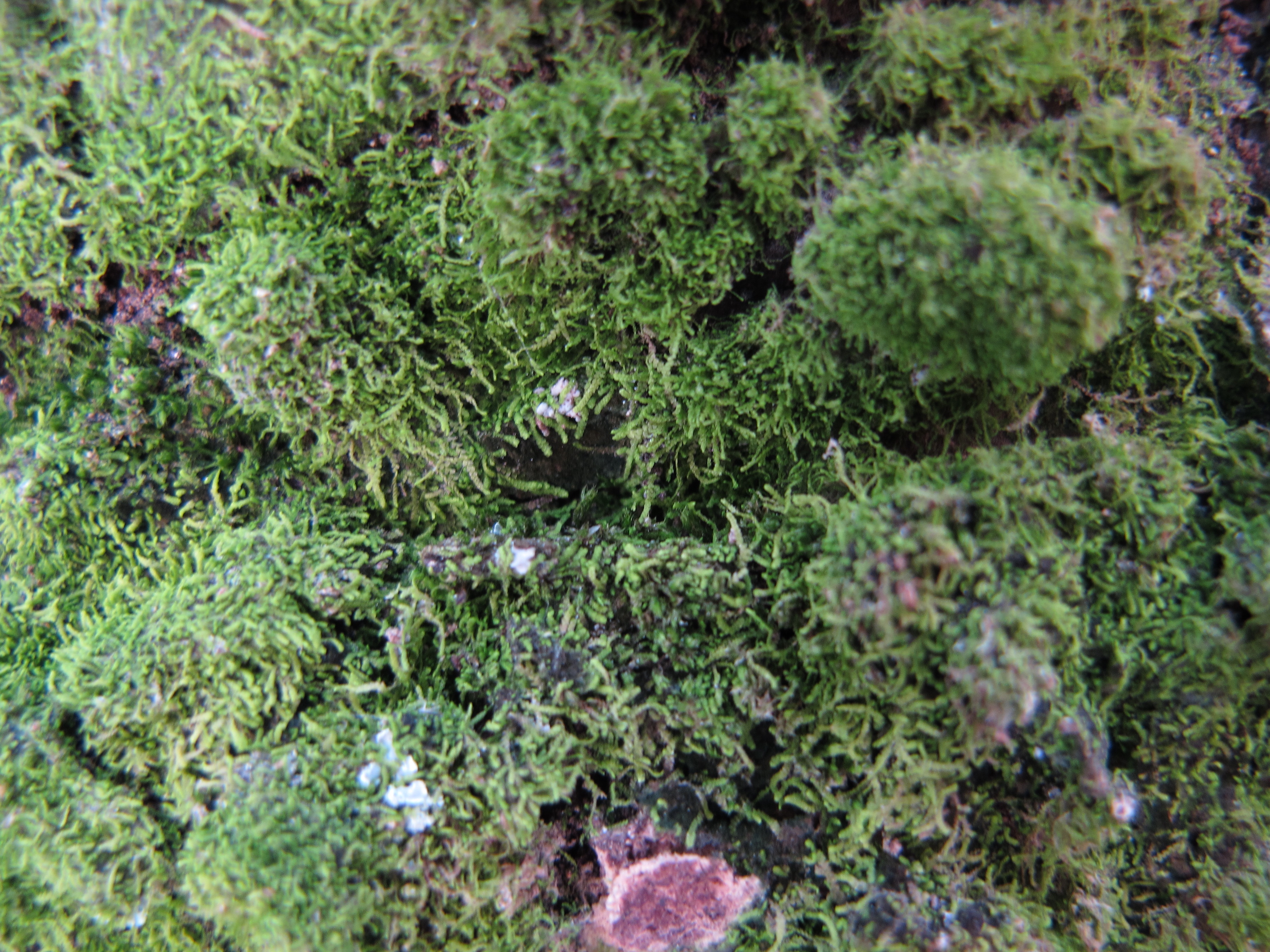
Lejeunea laetevirens

- Lejeunea laeta (Lehm. & Lindenb.) Lehm. & Lindenb.
- Lejeunea laetevirens Nees & Mont.
- Lejeunea laevicalyx Gottsche
- Lejeunea laii R.L.Zhu
- Lejeunea lamacerina (Steph.) Schiffn.
- Lejeunea latifolia Herzog
- Lejeunea latilobula (Herzog) R.L.Zhu & M.L.So
- Lejeunea laxa (Nees) Lindenb.
- Lejeunea laxiuscula Spruce
- Lejeunea leiantha Spruce
- Lejeunea leptalea Spruce
- Lejeunea leptantha R.M.Schust.
- Lejeunea leptocardia Spruce
- Lejeunea leptoscypha Spruce
- Lejeunea leratii (Steph.) Mizut.
- Lejeunea letabaensis S.W.Arnell
- Lejeunea leucophaea Spruce
- Lejeunea leucosis Besch. & Spruce
- Lejeunea libertiae Bonner & H.A.Mill.
- Lejeunea liliputiana Spruce
- Lejeunea limbata Spruce
- Lejeunea liromobana Singh Deo & D.K.Singh
- Lejeunea litoralis Steph.
- Lejeunea lomana E.W.Jones
- Lejeunea longicollis S.W.Arnell
- Lejeunea longidentata C.J.Bastos, Gradst., Vilas Bôas-Bastos & Schäf.-Verw.
- Lejeunea longifissa Stephani
- Lejeunea longilobula Pócs
- Lejeunea longirostrata R.M.Schust.
- Lejeunea longirostris Spruce
- Lejeunea lowriana Steph.
- Lejeunea lumbricoides (Nees) Nees
- Lejeunea lunatigastria Tixier
- Lejeunea lusoria (Lindenb. & Gottsche) Steph.
- Lejeunea luzonensis (Steph.) R.L.Zhu & M.J.Lai
- Lejeunea lyncei Taylor
- Lejeunea lyratiflora Prantl

== M ==
- Lejeunea macrocardia Spruce
- Lejeunea macrorhyncha Spruce
- Lejeunea magohukui Mizut.
- Lejeunea malangensis (Herzog) R.L.Zhu & Y.M.Wei
- Lejeunea mandonii (Steph.) Müll.Frib.
- Lejeunea marasmodes Spruce
- Lejeunea maritima Spruce
- Lejeunea marsupiifolia Spruce
- Lejeunea masoalae Pócs
- Lejeunea massalongoana (Schiffn. ex P.Syd.) Solari
- Lejeunea megalandra Spruce
- Lejeunea megalantha Spruce
- Lejeunea megalostipa Spruce
- Lejeunea mehrana M.Dey, D.K.Singh & D.Singh
- Lejeunea meridensis Ilk.-Borg.
- Lejeunea micholitzii Mizut.
- Lejeunea micro-androecia Spruce
- Lejeunea microloba Taylor
- Lejeunea microphylla R.M.Schust.
- Lejeunea microrhegma Spruce
- Lejeunea microstipula Stephani
- Lejeunea mimula Hürl.
- Lejeunea minuta Mitt.
- Lejeunea minutiloba A.Evans
- Lejeunea minutilobula Horik.
- Lejeunea miocenica Heinrichs, Schäf.-Verw., M.A.M.Renner & G.E.Lee
- Lejeunea mitracalyx (Eifrig) Mizut.
- Lejeunea mittenii Mizut.
- Lejeunea mizoramensis Sushil K.Singh
- Lejeunea mizutanii Grolle
- Lejeunea molkenboeriana Sande Lac.
- Lejeunea monimiae (Steph.) Steph.
- Lejeunea monoica (Bischl.) R.M.Schust.
- Lejeunea monticola Spruce
- Lejeunea morobensis (Grolle) M.A.M.Renner & Pócs
- Lejeunea multidentata M.E.Reiner & Mustelier
- Lejeunea musae (Spreng.) Gottsche, Lindenb. & Nees
- Lejeunea muscicola Spruce
- Lejeunea musicola Spruce
- Lejeunea myriandroecia Spruce

== N ==
- Lejeunea nankaiensis (Stephani) S.Hatt.
- Lejeunea nanodes Spruce
- Lejeunea neelgherriana Gottsche
- Lejeunea nemoralis Gottsche
- Lejeunea nepalensis Steph.
- Lejeunea nesiotica Besch. & Spruce
- Lejeunea neumanniana Nees
- Lejeunea nietneri (Steph.) Steph. ex Watts
- Lejeunea nietneri (Stephani) Stephani
- Lejeunea nigra Stephani
- Lejeunea nilgiriensis (P.K.Verma & S.C.Srivast.) Sushil K.Singh & Pócs
- Lejeunea nipponica S.Hatt.
- Lejeunea notata Gottsche
- Lejeunea novoguineensis Schiffn.
- Lejeunea nymannii Steph.

== O ==
- Lejeunea obfusca Mitt.
- Lejeunea obidensis Spruce
- Lejeunea oblongifolia Lindenb. & Gottsche
- Lejeunea obscura Mitt.
- Lejeunea obtusangula Spruce
- Lejeunea obtusata Gottsche
- Lejeunea obtusistipula (Stephani) E.W.Jones
- Lejeunea ochracea Colenso
- Lejeunea oerstediana Lindenb. & Hampe
- Lejeunea okomuensis E.W.Jones
- Lejeunea oligoclada Spruce
- Lejeunea ophiocephala (Taylor) Mitt.
- Lejeunea oracola M.A.M.Renner
- Lejeunea orbicularis Spruce
- Lejeunea osculatiana De Not.
- Lejeunea otiana S.Hatt.
- Lejeunea ovalifolia Steph.

== P ==
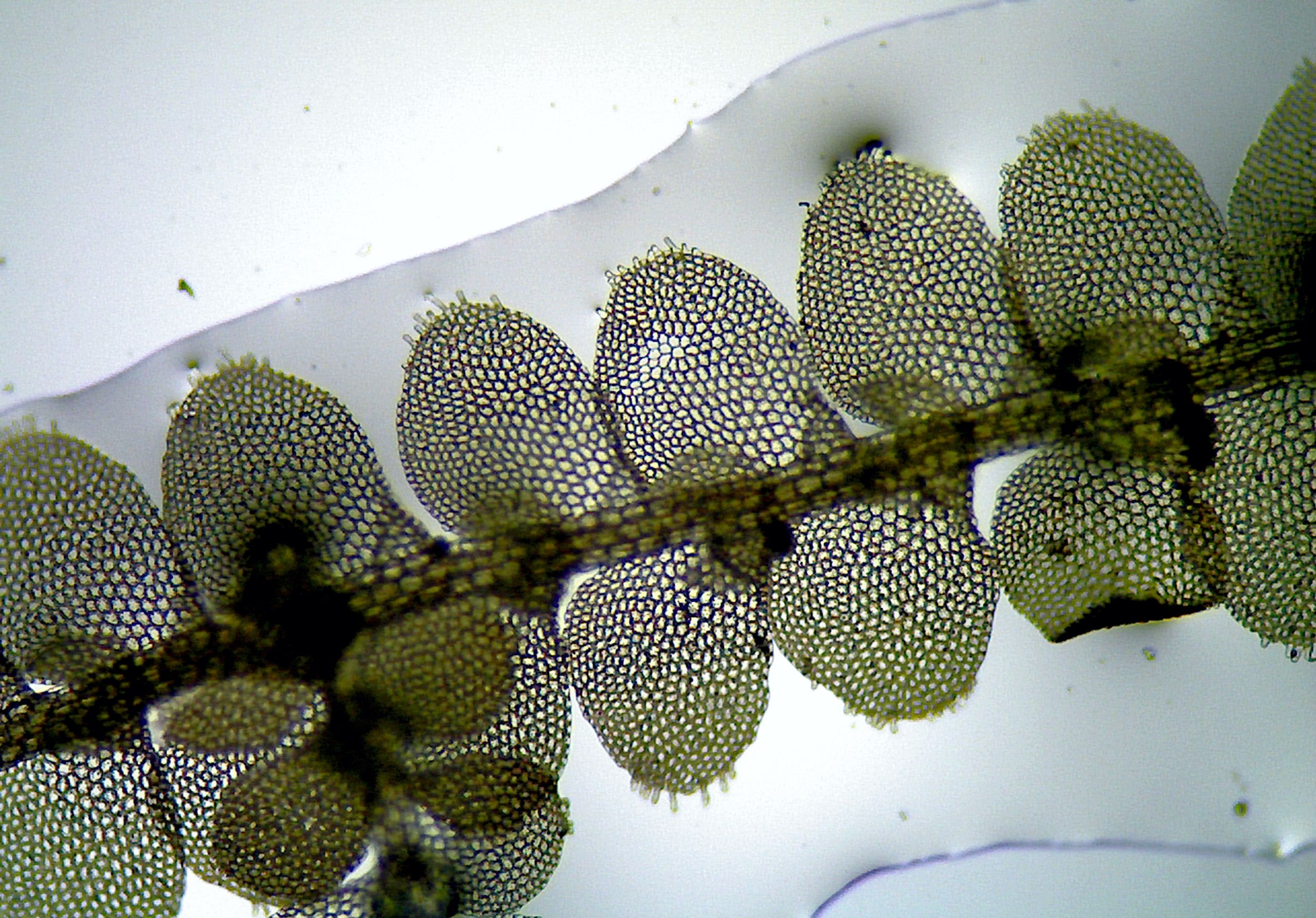
Lejeunea patriciae

- Lejeunea pacifica Mont.
- Lejeunea pallescens Mitt.
- Lejeunea pallida Lindenb. & Gottsche
- Lejeunea pallidevirens S.Hatt.
- Lejeunea pallidissima Gola
- Lejeunea pandurantha Spruce
- Lejeunea papilionacea Prantl
- Lejeunea papilionacea Steph.
- Lejeunea papuana (Pócs) R.M.Schust.
- Lejeunea paraensis Spruce
- Lejeunea paratropa Spruce
- Lejeunea parva (S.Hatt.) Mizut.
- Lejeunea parviloba Ångstr.
- Lejeunea parvisaccata (Stephani) Stephani
- Lejeunea pastasensis Spruce
- Lejeunea patagonica (Steph.) Steph.
- Lejeunea patellifera Spruce
- Lejeunea patens Lindb.
- Lejeunea patersonii (Steph.) Steph.
- Lejeunea patriciae Schäf.-Verw.
- Lejeunea paucidentata (Steph.) Grolle
- Lejeunea paucispina Spruce
- Lejeunea pectinella Mizut.
- Lejeunea pellucidissima Spruce
- Lejeunea pentotantha Spruce
- Lejeunea perigonialis Gottsche
- Lejeunea perpapillosa M.E.Reiner & K.C.Pôrto
- Lejeunea pertusa (Corda ex Nees & Mont.) Gottsche, Lindenb. & Nees
- Lejeunea pfleidereri Sushil K.Singh
- Lejeunea phyllobola Nees & Mont.
- Lejeunea pilifera Spruce
- Lejeunea piriformis Gottsche
- Lejeunea planiloba A.Evans
- Lejeunea platyceras Spruce
- Lejeunea plumula Spruce
- Lejeunea pocsii R.M.Schust.
- Lejeunea polilloensis Steph.
- Lejeunea polyantha Mont.
- Lejeunea polyploca Taylor
- Lejeunea praetervisa Steph.
- Lejeunea primordialis (Hook.f. & Taylor) Gottsche, Lindenb. & Nees
- Lejeunea princeps (Steph.) Mizut.
- Lejeunea prionoides Spruce
- Lejeunea proboscidea Gottsche
- Lejeunea procumbens Mitt.
- Lejeunea proliferans Herzog
- Lejeunea prominula Gottsche
- Lejeunea propagulifera Gradst.}
- Lejeunea prorepens Spruce
- Lejeunea pteridis Besch. & Spruce
- Lejeunea pterigonia (Lehm. & Lindenb.) Mont.
- Lejeunea ptosimophylla C.Massal.
- Lejeunea puiggariana Steph.
- Lejeunea pulchra C.J.Bastos & Gradst.
- Lejeunea pulchriflora (Pearson) G.E.Lee, Bechteler, Pócs, Schäf.-Verw. & Heinrichs
- Lejeunea pulverulenta (Steph.) M.E.Reiner
- Lejeunea pulvinata Nees & Mont.
- Lejeunea pusilla Spruce

== Q ==
- Lejeunea quinqueumbonata Spruce
- Lejeunea quintasii Stephani

== R ==
- Lejeunea raddiana Lindenb.
- Lejeunea radicans Lindenb. & Gottsche
- Lejeunea ramosissima Steph.
- Lejeunea ramulosa Spruce
- Lejeunea rara Steph.
- Lejeunea ravenelii Austin
- Lejeunea recurva M.E.Reiner
- Lejeunea reflexistipula (Lehm. & Lindenb.) Lehm. & Lindenb.
- Lejeunea reinerae Ilk.-Borg.
- Lejeunea remotifolia Hampe ex Steph.
- Lejeunea renistipula (Lindenb.) Spruce
- Lejeunea resonate G.E.Lee, Schäf.-Verw., M.A.M.Renner & Heinrichs
- Lejeunea resupinata (Steph.) Steph.
- Lejeunea reticulata Herzog
- Lejeunea retifolia P.C.Chen
- Lejeunea rhigophila M.A.M.Renner
- Lejeunea rhodesiae (Sim) R.M.Schust.
- Lejeunea rionegrensis Spruce
- Lejeunea riparia Mitt.
- Lejeunea rodriguezii (Stephani) Stephani
- Lejeunea roseo-alba Spruce
- Lejeunea rothii (Schwägr.) Gottsche, Lindenb. & Nees
- Lejeunea rotundifolia Mitt.
- Lejeunea rufopellucida Spruce
- Lejeunea ruthii (A.Evans) R.M.Schust.

== S ==
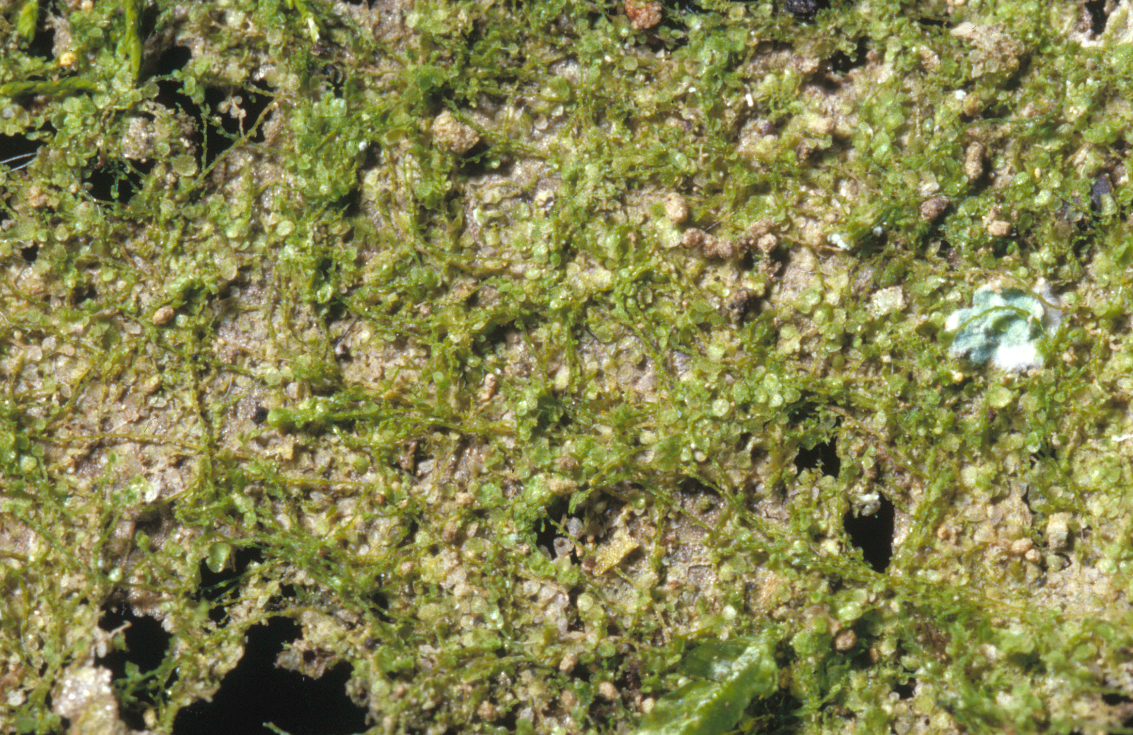
Lejeunea sinclairii

- Lejeunea sanctae-helenae M.Wigginton
- Lejeunea scabriflora Loitl.
- Lejeunea scabrifolia Gottsche ex Stephani
- Lejeunea scalaris (Stephani) S.Hatt.
- Lejeunea schiffneri V.F.Schiffner ex Steph.
- Lejeunea schimperi Gottsche ex Spruce
- Lejeunea schusteri Grolle
- Lejeunea semiscabrida Gottsche
- Lejeunea semperi Steph.
- Lejeunea seriata Lindenb. & Gottsche
- Lejeunea serpillifolioides (Raddi) Gradst.
- Lejeunea sessiliflora (Steph.) Grolle
- Lejeunea setacea (Steph.) Steph.
- Lejeunea setiloba Spruce
- Lejeunea sharpii (R.M.Schust.) R.M.Schust.
- Lejeunea siccata Spruce
- Lejeunea sikorae (Steph.) Steph.
- Lejeunea silvatica Gottsche
- Lejeunea sinclairii Spruce
- Lejeunea smaragdina Besch. & Spruce
- Lejeunea soae R.L.Zhu, Y.M.Wei, L.Söderstr., A.Hagborg & von Konrat
- Lejeunea solanicola Spruce
- Lejeunea sordida (Nees) Nees
- Lejeunea sphaerphora Gottsche, Lindenb. & Nees
- Lejeunea spiniloba Lindenb. & Gottsche
- Lejeunea spinuliflora Spruce
- Lejeunea splendida (Eifrig) G.E.Lee & Heinrichs
- Lejeunea spongia Spruce
- Lejeunea sporadica Besch. & Spruce
- Lejeunea spruce Hedw.
- Lejeunea squarrosa (Steph.) Y.M.Wei & R.L.Zhu
- Lejeunea squarrosula (Herzog) Solari
- Lejeunea srivastavae P.K.Verma & K.K.Rawat
- Lejeunea stenodentata M.A.M.Renner & Pócs
- Lejeunea stephaniana Mizut.
- Lejeunea stevensiana (Steph.) Mizut.
- Lejeunea streimannii Y.M.Wei & R.L.Zhu
- Lejeunea suaveolens Spruce
- Lejeunea subacuta Mitt.
- Lejeunea subaquatica Schiffn.
- Lejeunea subbifida Steph. ex Duss
- Lejeunea subelobata Carrington & Pearson
- Lejeunea subigiensis (Steph.) Steph.
- Lejeunea subolivacea Mizut.
- Lejeunea subpililoba Stephani
- Lejeunea subplana (Steph.) C.J.Bastos
- Lejeunea subrufula Spruce
- Lejeunea subsessilis Spruce
- Lejeunea subspathulata Spruce
- Lejeunea succulenta Herzog
- Lejeunea suffruticola Spruce
- Lejeunea sulphurea (Lehm. & Lindenb.) Spruce
- Lejeunea syoshii Inoue

== T ==
- Lejeunea talamancensis M.E.Reiner & Schäf.-Verw.
- Lejeunea tamasii M.E.Reiner, N.Salazar & C.Chung
- Lejeunea tamaspocsii G.E.Lee & Polish Bot.J.
- Lejeunea tapajosensis Spruce
- Lejeunea tarapotensis Spruce
- Lejeunea tenax Spruce
- Lejeunea tenella Taylor
- Lejeunea tenera (Sw.) Gottsche, Lindenb. & Nees
- Lejeunea terminalis Spruce
- Lejeunea terricola Spruce
- Lejeunea thallophora (Eifrig) Gradst.
- Lejeunea tjibodensis (Steph.) G.E.Lee & Heinrichs
- Lejeunea tonduzana (Steph.) M.E.Reiner
- Lejeunea topoensis Gradst. & M.E.Reiner
- Lejeunea tosana Stephani
- Lejeunea touwii (Pócs) R.M.Schust.
- Lejeunea trachygona Spruce
- Lejeunea triangulata (Herzog) R.M.Schust.
- Lejeunea trinitensis Lindenb.
- Lejeunea trochantha Spruce
- Lejeunea trukensis H.A.Mill. & Bonner
- Lejeunea truncatiloba Stephani
- Lejeunea truncatula Spruce
- Lejeunea tuberculiflora E.W.Jones ex Pócs
- Lejeunea tuberculosa Steph.
- Lejeunea tumida Mitt.
- Lejeunea tunquiniensis M.E.Reiner & Drehwald
- Lejeunea turbinifera Spruce
- Lejeunea tutuilana (Pearson) H.A.Mill.

== U ==
- Lejeunea uleana (Steph.) Steph.
- Lejeunea umbilicata (Nees) Nees
- Lejeunea ungulata Mitt.
- Lejeunea urbanii (Steph.) Steph.
- Lejeunea urbanioides G.E.Lee, Schäf.-Verw., M.A.M.Renner & Heinrichs
- Lejeunea utriculata (Steph.) Mizut.
- Lejeunea uvifera Mont.

== V ==
- Lejeunea vagans Spruce
- Lejeunea vaginata Stephani
- Lejeunea venezuelana (R.M.Schust.) R.L.Zhu & W.Ye
- Lejeunea ventricosa Schiffner
- Lejeunea vesicata Mitt.
- Lejeunea villaumei (Steph.) Grolle
- Lejeunea viridis R.M.Schust. ex L.Söderstr. & A.Hagborg
- Lejeunea vojtkoi Pócs
- Lejeunea vulgariformis Gottsche

== W ==
- Lejeunea wallichiana Gottsche
- Lejeunea wattsiana (Steph.) H.A.Mill., Bonner & Bischl.
- Lejeunea weigeltii Lindenb.
- Lejeunea wichurae (Steph.) Steph.
- Lejeunea wightii Lindenb.
- Lejeunea wilmsii (Stephani) Stephani

== X ==
- Lejeunea xiphophylla (Herzog) M.E.Reiner
- Lejeunea xiphotis Spruce

== Z ==
- Lejeunea zacuapana (Steph.) Prantl

== Other related genera ==
- Oryzolejeunea antillana (R.M.Schust.) R.M.Schust.
- Ptycholejeunea nietneri Stephani
- Stylolejeunea trinitensis (Lindenb.) Fulford
