= Drepanolejeunea bakeri =

Conservation status
- Endangered (IUCN 2.3)

Scientific classification
- Kingdom: Plantae
- Division: Marchantiophyta
- Class: Jungermanniopsida
- Order: Lejeuneales
- Family: Lejeuneaceae
- Genus: Drepanolejeunea
- Species: D. bakeri

Binomial name
- Drepanolejeunea bakeri Herzog

Species of liverwort

Drepanolejeunea bakeri is a species of liverwort endemic to the mountains of Mt. Makiling, Mt. Bulusan, and Mt. Polis of Luzon, Philippines. It is epiphyllous, growing on the upper surfaces of the leaves of other plants. It is classified as Endangered by the IUCN Red List of Threatened Species due to deforestation and habitat loss.

== Taxonomy ==
Drepanolejeunea bakeri was first described by the German bryologist Theodor Karl Julius Herzog in 1930 from specimens he found growing on the leaves of Ficus ampelos. The specimens were collected from the peak of Mt. Makiling by the American plant collector Charles Fuller Baker, from whom it was named after. It belongs to the genus Drepanolejeunea of the family Lejeuneaceae.

== Distribution and conservation ==
Drepanolejeunea bakeri has only been collected from three locations: Mt. Makiling, Mt. Bulusan, and Mt. Polis. Its total area of occupancy is less than 500 km^{2} (190 mi^{2}). Drastic changes to its habitat, including the near-deforestation of Mt. Polis and the recent eruptions of Mt. Bulusan has led to it being classified as Endangered by the IUCN Red List of Threatened Species.

== See also ==
- Drepanolejeunea senticosa
- List of threatened species of the Philippines
