= Spruceanthus theobromae =

Conservation status
- Critically Endangered (IUCN 2.3)

Scientific classification
- Kingdom: Plantae
- Division: Marchantiophyta
- Class: Jungermanniopsida
- Order: Lejeuneales
- Family: Lejeuneaceae
- Genus: Spruceanthus
- Species: S. theobromae

Binomial name
- Spruceanthus theobromae (Spruce) Gradst.

Synonyms
- Lejeunea theobromae Spruce; Ptychanthus theobromae (Spruce) Schiffn.

Species of liverwort

Spruceanthus theobromae is a species of liverwort in the family Lejeuneaceae. It is endemic to Ecuador, where it is the only liverwort species known to be endemic to the western foothills of the Ecuadorian Andes.

== Taxonomy ==
The species was first discovered and described by Richard Spruce as Lejeunea theobromae in 1884, publishing his findings in the Transactions & Proceedings of the Botanical Society of Edinburgh. In 1893, Victor Schiffner reclassified it as Ptychanthus theobromae in Engler and Prantl's work Die Natürlichen Pflanzenfamilien. Finally, in 1985, S. Rob Gradstein established its current classification as Spruceanthus theobromae. The type specimen was collected by Spruce from the bark of a cacao tree (Theobroma) near the Rio Ventana close to Guayaquil in Los Rios Province, Ecuador. Type specimens are preserved in the herbaria of Geneva (G), Manchester (MANCH 17343, 17344), and Vienna (W).

== Description ==
Spruceanthus theobromae is a robust liverwort that grows on tree bark, forming loosely ascending or possibly hanging stems that measure 3–3.5 millimetres in width. When dry, the plant appears brownish-green in colour. The plant's branching pattern follows the Lejeunea-type structure, with fertile plants developing fork-like divisions. The lower portions of the stem feature curved, whip-like branches. The stem itself is sturdy, composed of approximately 35 outer (epidermal) cells surrounding more than 100 inner (medullary) cells, with the outer layers having thicker, brown-pigmented walls while the inner portions remain colourless.

The leaves are widely spread when dry and slightly overlapping. Each leaf has a roughly oblong shape, measuring 1.8–2.2 mm long by 1.2–1.4 mm wide, with rounded or slightly pointed tips. The leaf cells are notably elongated and contain very small, irregularly star-shaped thickenings (trigones) where cells meet. The underleaves (modified leaves on the lower surface) are relatively small, spaced apart, and roughly circular or transversely oval in shape.

The species is capable of producing both male and female reproductive structures on the same plant (autoicous) or in close proximity (paroicous). Male reproductive structures (androecia) form on short side branches or the main stem, while female structures (gynoecia) develop with 1–2 innovations (new growth) below them. The perianth (protective structure around the developing sporophyte extends well beyond the surrounding leaves and features 5–8 ridges or keels.

When present, the spores are round and feature distinctive rosette patterns. The spore capsules contain specialised cells called elaters (approximately 72 per capsule) that help disperse the spores, each marked by a single spiral pattern. No methods of vegetative reproduction (reproduction without spores) have been observed to occur in this species.

== Distribution and habitat ==
The species occurs in a narrow corridor at the western base of the Andes between 100–300 m (330–980 ft) elevation, in areas characterized by frequent morning fog and high annual rainfall exceeding 2,500 mm (98 in). It thrives in tropical equatorial conditions with temperatures between 23–25 °C (73–77 °F). The species is found across approximately 400 km^{2} (150 sq mi) of land, primarily in cacao plantations.

== Ecology ==
Spruceanthus theobromae shows unusual host specificity among tropical bryophytes, growing almost exclusively on the trunk bases of Theobroma cacao (cacao trees) that are older than 20 years. It shows a preference for moist habitats with periodic inundation and is typically found in plantations with low to moderate management intensity. The species is classified as a "perennial shuttle species" based on its life strategy characteristics.

=== Reproduction ===
The species is monoicous (having both male and female reproductive structures on the same plant) and reproduces frequently through sexual means, with no observed asexual reproduction. Its spores measure 30–40 × 25 × 35 μm.

=== Associated species ===
Spruceanthus theobromae commonly grows alongside other bryophytes including Bryopteris filicina, Ceratolejeunea cornuta, C. cubensis, Fissidens minutus, and Neckeropsis undulata. It shows a negative association with drought-tolerant species such as Lejeunea laetevirens.

== Conservation ==
Initially reported from only five tree trunks at a single site, a 2000 IUCN assessment classified it as Critically Endangered. However, a 2001 study found the species at 12 different cacao plantations and suggested reclassification as Near Threatened.

The species faces several conservation challenges. It is unique as the only epiphytic liverwort in tropical America recorded exclusively from plantations. Its survival depends heavily on the continuation of cacao plantations with low management intensity. Local farming practices, particularly "limpia" (the removal of epiphytes from trees), pose a significant threat to populations. The species' habitat has been significantly impacted by deforestation, with less than 4% of the original forest cover remaining in the region since the late 1950s.
