= Caudalejeunea grolleana =

Conservation status
- Endangered (IUCN 2.3)

Scientific classification
- Kingdom: Plantae
- Division: Marchantiophyta
- Class: Jungermanniopsida
- Order: Lejeuneales
- Family: Lejeuneaceae
- Genus: Caudalejeunea
- Species: C. grolleana

Binomial name
- Caudalejeunea grolleana Gradst.
- Native range of Caudalejeunea grolleana

Species of liverwort

Caudalejeunea grolleana is a species of liverwort in the family Lejeuneaceae. It is an endangered species endemic to Madagascar.

== Taxonomy and history ==
Caudalejeunea grolleana was first formally described in 1974 by the Dutch botanist Stephan Robbert Gradstein. The species epithet honours the German bryologist Rudolf Grolle, who provided the original type material from which the species was originally described.

== Distribution and habitat ==
Known from just two localities in northern Madagascar, Caudalejeunea grolleana grows on tree bark and dead wood in undisturbed lowland rainforest. Its habitat in Madagascar has a tropical to subtropical climate.

== Description ==
Caudalejeunea grolleana is a small, olive-green to brownish liverwort that grows in dense mats on tree bark. Individual plants rarely exceed 5 mm in length and are about 1–1.3 mm wide. The plant branches irregularly in a feather-like pattern, with branches growing at right angles to the main stem. The stem itself is quite thin, measuring only 0.08–0.12 mm in diameter.

The leaves are arranged in an overlapping pattern along the stem and stand slightly upright. Each leaf is oval-oblong in shape with a rounded tip, measuring 0.6–0.8 mm long. A distinctive feature of this species is its small, inflated leaf pouches (lobules) on the underside of each leaf, which typically have one or two tiny teeth. Between the leaves on the underside of the stem are small, trapezoid-shaped underleaves that are about three times wider than the stem.

The species can reproduce both sexually and asexually, and is monoicous (having both male and female reproductive structures on the same plant). The female reproductive structures produce a partially hidden, pear-shaped perianth (protective covering) with 4–5 sharp ridges, while the male structures are arranged in slender spikes at the ends of stems or branches. These reproductive features, combined with the specific leaf and underleaf characteristics, distinguish C. grolleana from related species.

== Conservation status ==
Caudalejeunea grolleana is listed as endangered by the International Union for the Conservation of Nature under criteria B1 and B2cd, based on its small area of occupancy, few known locations, and the decline of its habitat. It is threatened by deforestation.
