= Drepanolejeunea senticosa =

Conservation status
- Critically Endangered (IUCN 2.3)

Scientific classification
- Kingdom: Plantae
- Division: Marchantiophyta
- Class: Jungermanniopsida
- Order: Lejeuneales
- Family: Lejeuneaceae
- Genus: Drepanolejeunea
- Species: D. senticosa

Binomial name
- Drepanolejeunea senticosa Bischl.

Species of liverwort

Drepanolejeunea senticosa is a critically endangered species of liverwort in the family Lejeuneaceae, endemic to Cuba. The species is epiphyllous, meaning it grows on the surfaces of living leaves, and is found in subtropical/tropical moist lowland forest habitats. While male specimens have been frequently observed, the species' perianth and capsule remain undescribed.

== Taxonomy and history ==
The species was first formally described in 1964 by the French bryologist Hélène Bischler. It is known only from a single type specimen collected in 1860 by Charles Wright in Cuba, and its current population status is unknown.

== Description ==
Drepanolejeunea senticosa is a small liverwort characterised by its distinctive leaf structure. The leaves are positioned obliquely on the stem at angles between 15 and 60 degrees, with a slightly convex surface. The leaves have a smooth keel (the folded edge) that forms a wide angle (90–135 degrees) with the leaf's free ventral margin.

The leaf margins have a distinctively lobed structure: the upper (dorsal) margin features 3–6 lobes, each 3–6 cells in length, while the lower (ventral) margin has 2–3 shorter lobes that are 1–3 cells long and 2–3 cells wide at their base. The leaf cells are relatively large, with basal cells measuring 30–35 micrometers in length. The underleaves (amphigastria) typically have lobes that are 3–4 cells long and 2 cells wide at their base.

This species is monoicous, meaning individual plants possess both male and female reproductive structures. While male structures have been frequently observed, the perianth and capsule (female reproductive structures) remain undescribed.

== Conservation status ==
Drepanolejeunea senticosa is known only from the original type locality, and its current population status is unknown. The IUCN Red List assessed D. senticosa as Critically Endangered in 2000 due to its extremely restricted range (known from only one locality), declining habitat quality, and presumably very small population size. Some experts suggest it may already be extinct, though this cannot be confirmed without thorough searches of its original locality and similar surrounding habitats. While the specific threats to D. senticosa are not well documented, its extreme rarity and occurrence in a generally threatened habitat type make it particularly vulnerable to extinction. As of 2000, the IUCN recommended that the species's status needed updating, though no subsequent assessment has been published.
