= Colura zoophaga =

Scientific classification
- Kingdom: Plantae
- Division: Marchantiophyta
- Class: Jungermanniopsida
- Order: Lejeuneales
- Family: Lejeuneaceae
- Genus: Colura
- Species: C. zoophaga

Binomial name
- Colura zoophaga E.Fischer

Species of liverwort

Colura zoophaga is a species of epiphytic liverwort that is endemic to the African highlands, specifically parts of Kenya. It belongs to the genus Colura, which has been hypothesized to be carnivorous as early as 1893. It is a recently described species that was the subject of the first scientific study aimed at investigating the allegations of carnivory in liverworts.

== Description ==
Colura zoophaga is a small epiphytic liverwort that measures no more than several millimetres in size and grows on the trunk and branches of Cliffortia nitida. It possesses elongated water sacs formed by the fusion of the upper leaf margin rolling inward down to the rest of the leaf. A funnel-shaped channel at the lower leaf margin leads to a small opening into the water sac and is covered by a movable lid that only open inward. Leaves are 1 mm long or smaller. It is because of this bladder-like configuration that these traps have been compared to those of Utricularia.

== Carnivory ==
The habitat of Colura zoophaga, epiphytic and deriving all nutrients from rainwater, has been compared to that of known carnivorous plants such as Brocchinia reducta, an epiphytic bromeliad. The carnivorous habit typically evolves in genera and species that are located in nutrient-poor habitats, but are very moist. In that way, this species of liverwort at least fits the profile for a carnivorous plant.

The traps have been described as early as 1893 by Karl von Goebel. Other botanists, such as Anton Kerner von Marilaun, also noted the trap structure and described how prey were captured in other members of the genus. Colura zoophaga was chosen as a subject for study in an investigation into the claims of liverwort carnivory. Wilhelm Barthlott and his colleagues noticed that ciliates were grazing the surface of the leaves for bacteria. In the lab they introduced Blepharisma americana and observed them also grazing for bacteria in the funnel-shaped channel, pressing on the one-way door. The ciliate's behavior resulted in them getting trapped in the water sac, eventually dying and bursting, releasing their contents.

It has not been determined, however, if and how Colura zoophaga attracts its prey or if it produces proteases or other digestive enzymes to break down the prey. Barthlott et al. suggested that it may be reasonable to assume it does not produce such enzymes and that, like some other species of carnivorous plants (e.g. some Heliamphora species), it may rely on commensals such as bacteria to break down the prey. There has been no experimental evidence of this, nor has there been evidence of absorption of the prey by the traps. These are typically the criteria by which other carnivorous plants have been identified.
