= Lejeunea drehwaldii =

Conservation status
- Critically Endangered (IUCN 2.3)

Scientific classification
- Kingdom: Plantae
- Division: Marchantiophyta
- Class: Jungermanniopsida
- Order: Lejeuneales
- Family: Lejeuneaceae
- Genus: Lejeunea
- Species: L. drehwaldii

Binomial name
- Lejeunea drehwaldii Heinrichs & Schäf.-Verw.

Synonyms
- Sphaerolejeunea umbilicata Herzog

Species of liverwort

Lejeunea drehwaldii, synonym Sphaerolejeunea umbilicata, is a species of liverwort in the family Lejeuneaceae. It is endemic to Colombia. Its natural habitat is subtropical or tropical moist lowland forests.

== Taxonomy ==
The species was first described by T. K. G. Herzog in 1938 as Sphaerolejeunea umbilicata. The genus Sphaerolejeunea was sunk into Lejeunea in 2012. As the name Lejeunea umbilicata was already in use, the replacement name Lejeunea drehwaldii was published.

== Description ==
Lejeunea drehwaldii is a small, bright green liverwort that grows primarily on the surfaces of living leaves (epiphyllous). The plant body, or gametophyte, spreads closely against its substrate, reaching 1.5–2.3 mm in width, and displays extensive branching. Its stem follows a distinctive zig-zag pattern and bears overlapping, rounded leaves arranged in two rows. A unique feature of this species is the presence of specialized dead, transparent (hyaline) cells forming a border around the leaf edges, which is visible in mature leaves but absent in young ones. The species is monoecious (autoicous), meaning both male and female reproductive structures occur on the same plant but in different locations. These reproductive structures are abundantly produced but remain largely hidden when the plant is viewed from above, as they do not project beyond the vegetative leaves. The female reproductive structure (perianth) is cylindrical to egg-shaped and lacks the distinct ridges (keels) found in many related species, instead featuring a unique umbilicate (navel-like) apex formed by a ring of triangular cells.

The spore-producing structure (sporophyte) of L. drehwaldii includes a black, spherical capsule measuring 250–330 micrometres in diameter, which splits into four parts upon maturity. The capsule contains two distinct types of sterile filaments (elaters) that aid in spore dispersal: 18 marginal elaters attached at the edges and 4 additional elaters fixed along their entire length to the inner surface. The spores, which begin germinating while still inside the capsule (precocious germination), are rectangular to irregular in shape and feature a distinctive surface pattern of small, round granules and 3–5 rosette-like structures.
