= Bryopteris gaudichaudii =

Conservation status
- Critically Endangered (IUCN 2.3)

Scientific classification
- Kingdom: Plantae
- Clade: Embryophytes
- Division: Marchantiophyta
- Class: Jungermanniopsida
- Order: Lejeuneales
- Family: Lejeuneaceae
- Genus: Bryopteris
- Species: B. gaudichaudii

Binomial name
- Bryopteris gaudichaudii Gottsche

Synonyms
- Lejeunea gaudichaudii (Gottsche) Steph.; Bryopteris madagassa Steph.; Bryopteris madagascariensis Steph.; Rectolejeunea gaudichaudii (Gottsche) Steph.

Species of liverwort

Bryopteris gaudichaudii is a species of liverwort in the family Lejeuneaceae. It is known from islands in the western Indian Ocean and is considered critically endangered.

== Distribution and habitat ==
B. gaudichaudii is known from the islands of Madagascar, Mauritius, and Réunion. On Madagascar it has been found growing in montane rainforest and coastal heath. Despite extensive searches, this species has not been found on Réunion since the collection of the type specimen, and may be extinct on the island.
