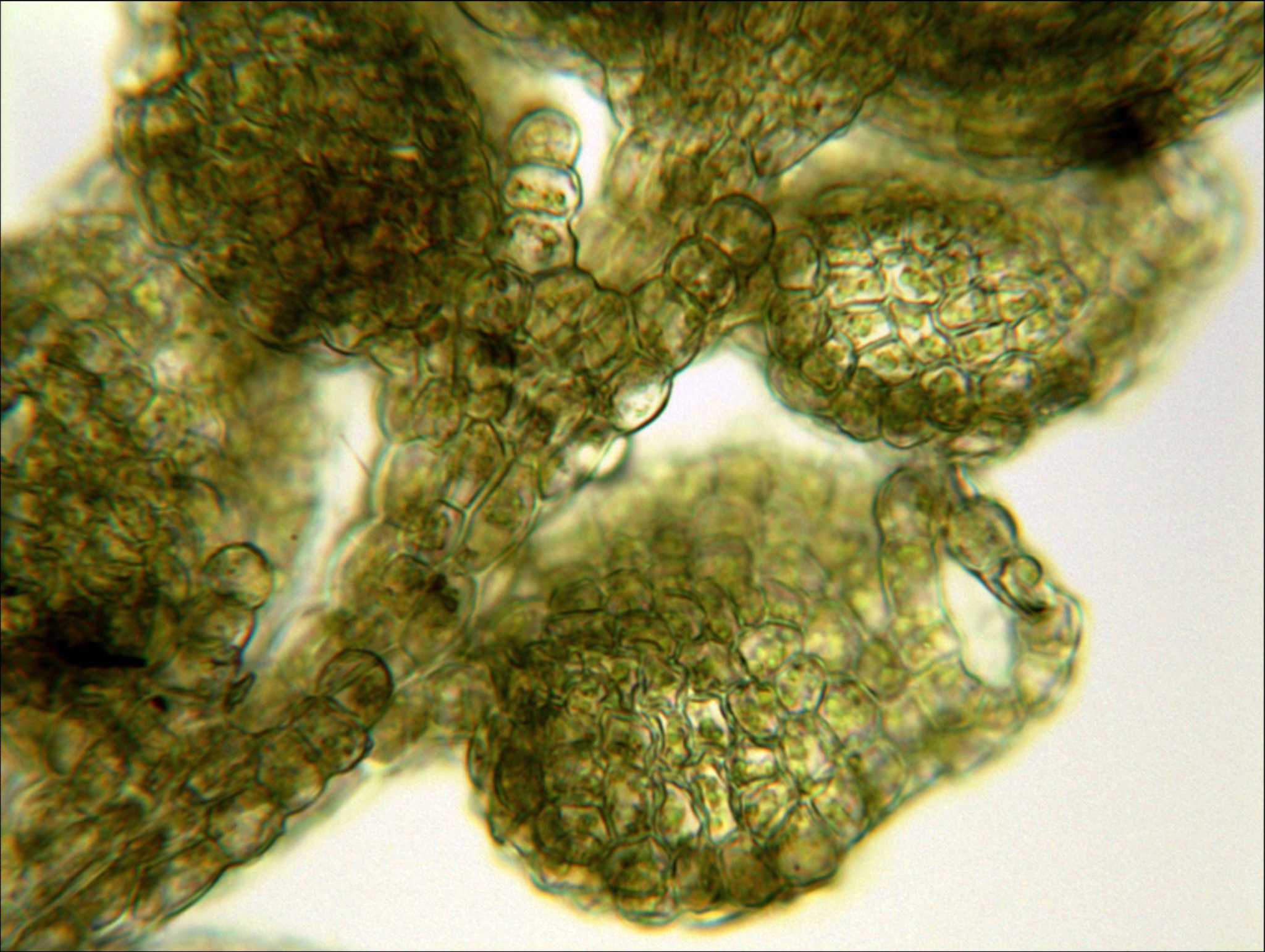

Scientific classification
- Kingdom: Plantae
- Division: Marchantiophyta
- Class: Jungermanniopsida
- Order: Lejeuneales
- Family: Lejeuneaceae
- Genus: Siphonolejeunea
- Species: S. raharahanehemiae

Binomial name
- Siphonolejeunea raharahanehemiae de Lange & M.A.M.Renner

= Siphonolejeunea raharahanehemiae =

Species of liverwort

Siphonolejeunea raharahanehemiae is a species of liverwort in family Lejeuneaceae.

== Taxonomy ==
The species was first described in 2020 by Peter de Lange and Matt Renner, and is endemic to New Zealand.

== Occurrence ==
It is found on Metrosideros bartletti, and is at severe risk of extinction.
