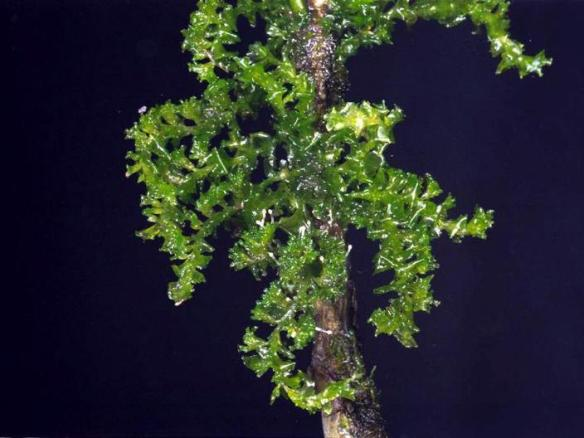

Conservation status
- Critically Endangered (IUCN 2.3)

Scientific classification
- Kingdom: Plantae
- Division: Marchantiophyta
- Class: Jungermanniopsida
- Order: Lejeuneales
- Family: Lejeuneaceae
- Genus: Colura
- Species: C. irrorata

Binomial name
- Colura irrorata (Spruce) Heinrichs, Y.Yu, Schäf.-Verw. & Pócs

Synonyms
- Myriocolea irrorata Spruce

= Colura irrorata =

Species of liverwort

Colura irrorata is a species of liverwort in family Lejeuneaceae. It is endemic to Ecuador. Its natural habitat is subtropical or tropical moist lowland forests. It is threatened by habitat loss. The species was previously known as Myriocolea irrorata, but was transferred to Colura in 2012 following a phylogenetic analysis of nuclear and plastid molecular markers and a reinterpretation of morphological characters.

== Taxonomy ==
The species was first discovered by the English bryologist Richard Spruce in 1857 along the Río Topo in the Eastern Andes of Ecuador. After its initial collection, the species went unobserved for nearly 150 years until it was rediscovered in 2002. When first describing the species in 1884, Spruce considered it so different from other liverworts in the family Lejeuneaceae that he placed it in its own genus, Myriocolea. Later botanists maintained this separation, with some even placing it in its own subfamily, Myriocoleoideae. However, in 2012, molecular studies of DNA sequences showed that the species was actually closely related to members of the genus Colura, particularly to C. calyptrifolia, leading to its reclassification as Colura irrorata.

== Description ==
Colura irrorata is distinctive among liverworts for its relatively large size, with leafy shoots growing up to 5 cm long. It grows on twigs of shrubs along the Topo and Zuñac rivers, particularly in areas that are periodically submerged by flowing water. The plant has several unique features, including leaves that are inserted straight across the stem (transversely) and hollow, rather than having the specialised leaf pouches typical of other Colura species. It also produces numerous reproductive structures clustered together on the plant. The unusual appearance of C. irrorata appears to be an adaptation to its habitat in fast-flowing waters. While most Colura species grow on tree bark or leaves and have specialised leaf pouches for storing water, C. irrorata has evolved different features suited to life in repeatedly flooded environments.

== Conservation ==
As an endemic species known from only a few locations along specific rivers in Ecuador, C. irrorata is particularly vulnerable to habitat destruction and changes in its environment. Its rediscovery in 2002 was significant for conservation efforts, as it confirmed the species' continued existence and allowed for updated assessment of its status and threats.
