= Frullanoides =

Scientific classification
- Kingdom: Plantae
- Division: Marchantiophyta
- Class: Jungermanniopsida
- Order: Lejeuneales
- Family: Lejeuneaceae
- Genus: Frullanoides; Raddi

Species
- See text

Genus of Lejeuneaceae plants

Frullanoides is a genus of liverworts in the family Lejeuneaceae, mostly found in the New World Tropics, with Frullanoides tristis having a distribution that extends into the Old World Tropics.

== Species ==
Currently accepted species include:

- Frullanoides bahamensis (A. Evans) Slageren
- Frullanoides corticalis (Lehm. & Lindenb.) Slageren
- Frullanoides densifolia Raddi
- Frullanoides laciniatiflora (Loitl.) Slageren
- Frullanoides liebmanniana (Lindenb. & Gottsche) Slageren
- Frullanoides mexicana Slageren
- Frullanoides tristis (Stephani) Slageren
