= Luteolejeunea herzogii =

Conservation status
- Least Concern (IUCN 3.1)

Scientific classification
- Kingdom: Plantae
- Division: Marchantiophyta
- Class: Jungermanniopsida
- Order: Lejeuneales
- Family: Lejeuneaceae
- Genus: Luteolejeunea
- Species: L. herzogii

Binomial name
- Luteolejeunea herzogii (Buchloch) Piippo

Species of liverwort

Luteolejeunea herzogii is a species of liverwort in the family Lejeuneaceae. This species is distributed in Costa Rica, Panama, Colombia, and Peru, and it is known from more than 25 locations. It grows on dead wood in tropical forest and lowland habitat. There are no immediate threats and it is probably not in decline at this time.
