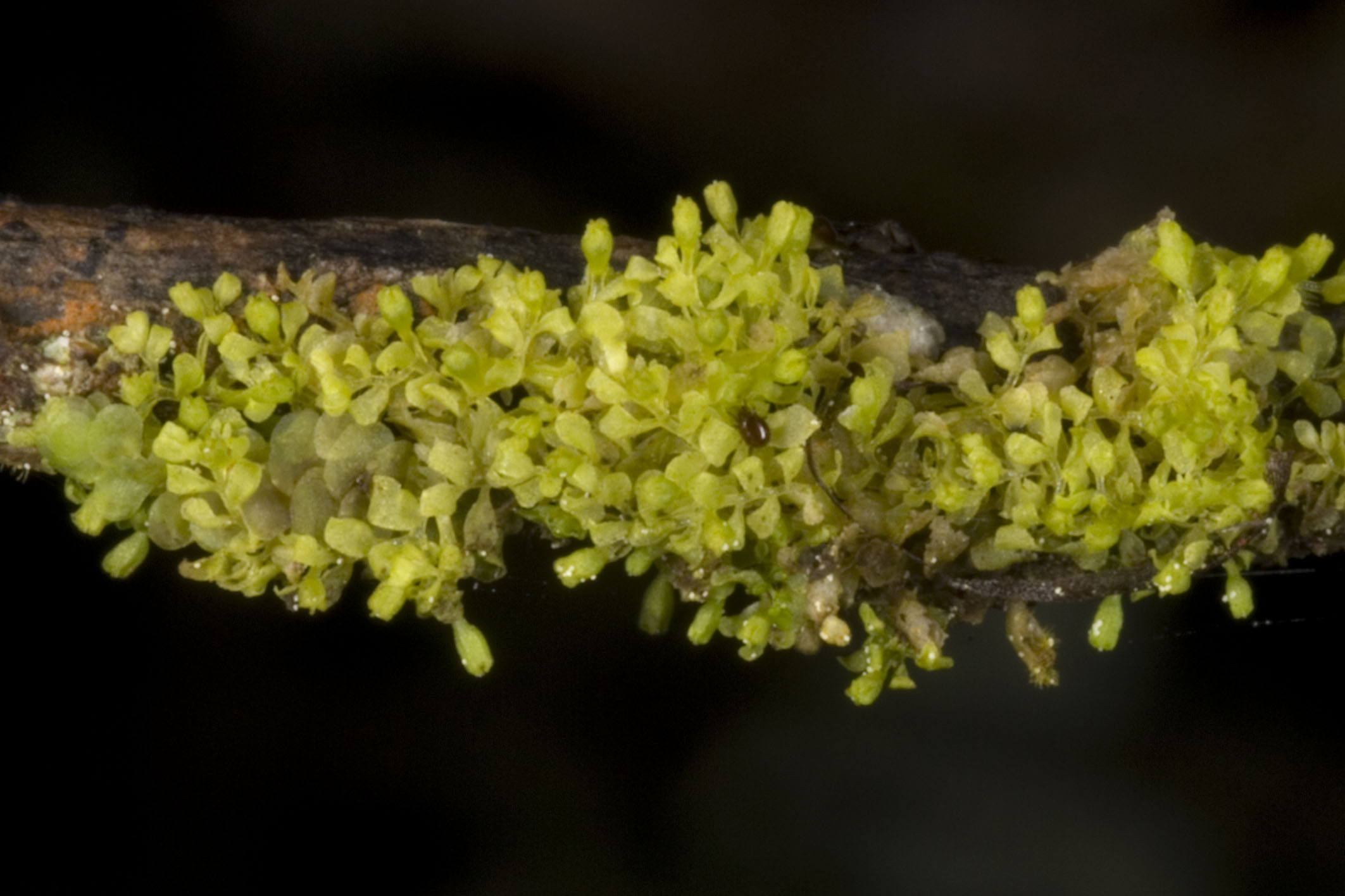
- Siphonolejeunea nudipes

Scientific classification
- Kingdom: Plantae
- Division: Marchantiophyta
- Class: Jungermanniopsida
- Order: Lejeuneales
- Family: Lejeuneaceae
- Genus: Siphonolejeunea; Herzog

Type species
- Siphonolejeunea nudicalicyna

= Siphonolejeunea =

Genus of liverworts

Siphonolejeunea is a genus of liverworts in the family Lejeuneaceae.

The genus was first described by Theodor Herzog in 1942, and the type species is Siphonolejeunea nudicalicyna. The genus circumscription was revised in 2020 by Peter de Lange and Matt Renner.

Species of the genus are found in New Zealand, Australia and South America.

== Species ==
The New Zealand Organisms Register lists:

- Siphonolejeunea bidentata (B.M.Thiers) M.A.M.Renner
- Siphonolejeunea carcharias (M.A.M.Renner) M.A.M.Renner
- Siphonolejeunea conchophylla (Grolle) M.A.M.Renner
- Siphonolejeunea edentata S.Fish & Glenny
- Siphonolejeunea fragilis (R.M.Schust.) M.A.M.Renner
- Siphonolejeunea hamata (Grolle) M.A.M.Renner
- Siphonolejeunea hispida (R.M.Schust.) M.A.M.Renner
- Siphonolejeunea lanceolata S.Fish & Glenny
- Siphonolejeunea nudicalycina Herzog
- Siphonolejeunea nudipes (Hook.f. & Taylor) Herzog
- Siphonolejeunea olgae R.M.Schust.
- Siphonolejeunea papillosa (Glenny) M.A.M.Renner
- Siphonolejeunea raharahanehemiae de Lange & M.A.M.Renner
- Siphonolejeunea secunda (M.A.M.Renner) M.A.M.Renner
- Siphonolejeunea talinayi (S.W.Arnell) M.A.M.Renner

Additionally, GBIF lists :

- Siphonolejeunea neesii (Mont.) Bischl.
- Siphonolejeunea elegantissima (Steph.) Grolle
- Siphonolejeunea jarmaniana (Grolle) M.A.M.Renner
- Siphonolejeunea occidentalis (Pócs) M.A.M.Renner
- Siphonolejeunea radulifolia (C.Massal.) M.A.M.Renner
- Siphonolejeunea schiffneri (Schiffn.) Herzog
