= Lejeunea patens =

Scientific classification
- Kingdom: Plantae
- Division: Marchantiophyta
- Class: Jungermanniopsida
- Order: Lejeuneales
- Family: Lejeuneaceae
- Genus: Lejeunea
- Species: L. patens

Binomial name
- Lejeunea patens Lindb.

Species of liverwort

Lejeunea patens is a small leafy liverwort in the family Lejeuneaceae. It is found in the northern hemisphere. It grows on wet rock faces in temperate rainforests and other areas of high rainfall.
