= Lejeunea mandonii =

Conservation status
- Vulnerable (IUCN 3.1)

Scientific classification
- Kingdom: Plantae
- Division: Marchantiophyta
- Class: Jungermanniopsida
- Order: Lejeuneales
- Family: Lejeuneaceae
- Genus: Lejeunea
- Species: L. mandonii

Binomial name
- Lejeunea mandonii (Steph.) Müll. Frib.

Species of liverwort

Lejeunea mandonii, also known as Atlantic lejeunea, is a species of liverwort from the Lejeuneaceae family.

== Description ==
Lejeunea mandonii is a very small, leafy liverwort. Its leaves are incubous and exhibit both shades of green and yellow. Stems of L. mandonii are usually less than 10mm long. L. mandonii is the only British member of the genus Lejeunea that possesses smooth and cylindrical perianths.

== Distribution ==
Lejeunea mandonii is endemic to Europe where it can be found within the following countries and territories: United Kingdom, Ireland, Portugal, Canary Islands and Madeira.

Within the United Kingdom it can be found in a few sites located in Western Scotland and the Lizard peninsula of Western Cornwall. The distribution within the UK is restricted to Atlantic coastal regions.

== Habitat ==
This species can be found in sheltered and shaded woodlands where it grows among other species of liverworts and mosses.

Lejeunea mandonii can also be found growing on rocky overhands, ravines and north facing cliffs near to the coast.

It has also been recorded growing on the bark and trunks of trees.

== Threats ==
Lejeunea mandonii is a rare species, which has populations persisting in fragmented locations. Habitat fragmentation causes populations to be isolated and therefore inbreeding and a loss of genetic diversity can occur. This can cause a species to be more at risk of extinction.

The species is also under threat from being shaded out by both native and introduced plant species. Heavy shade can be detrimental to L. mandonii populations. Non-native evergreen tree species such as the Western Red Cedar Thuja plicata when planted in proximity to L. mandonii causes heavy shade. Deciduous tree species such as the native Sycamore Acer pseudoplatanus if allowed to mature can also be responsible for shading out L. mandonii.

Invasive species such as the shrub Rhododendron ponticum can also harm L. mandonii populations. Regular human intervention is needed to cut back the shrub so that it does not shade out rocky habitat where Lejeunea mandonii grows.

All three current known populations of L. mandonii in Scotland are isolated, growing on three different individual Ash trees Fraxinus excelsior. Due to the arrival of the fungi Hymenoscyphus fraxineus within the United Kingdom, they are threatened by Ash dieback disease. If these trees were to succumb to ash dieback, L. mandonii could lose further habitat.

Due to populations of L. mandonii usually being found in small patches of habitat. Its rarity and vulnerability can put it at risk of poaching by bryologists.
