= Myriocoleopsis fluviatilis =

Conservation status
- Vulnerable (IUCN 2.3)

Scientific classification
- Kingdom: Plantae
- Division: Marchantiophyta
- Class: Jungermanniopsida
- Order: Lejeuneales
- Family: Lejeuneaceae
- Genus: Myriocoleopsis
- Species: M. fluviatilis

Binomial name
- Myriocoleopsis fluviatilis (Steph.) Reiner & Gradst.

Species of liverwort

Myriocoleopsis fluviatilis is a species of liverworts in the family Lejeuneaceae. It is endemic to Brazil. Its natural habitat is rivers. It is threatened by habitat loss.
