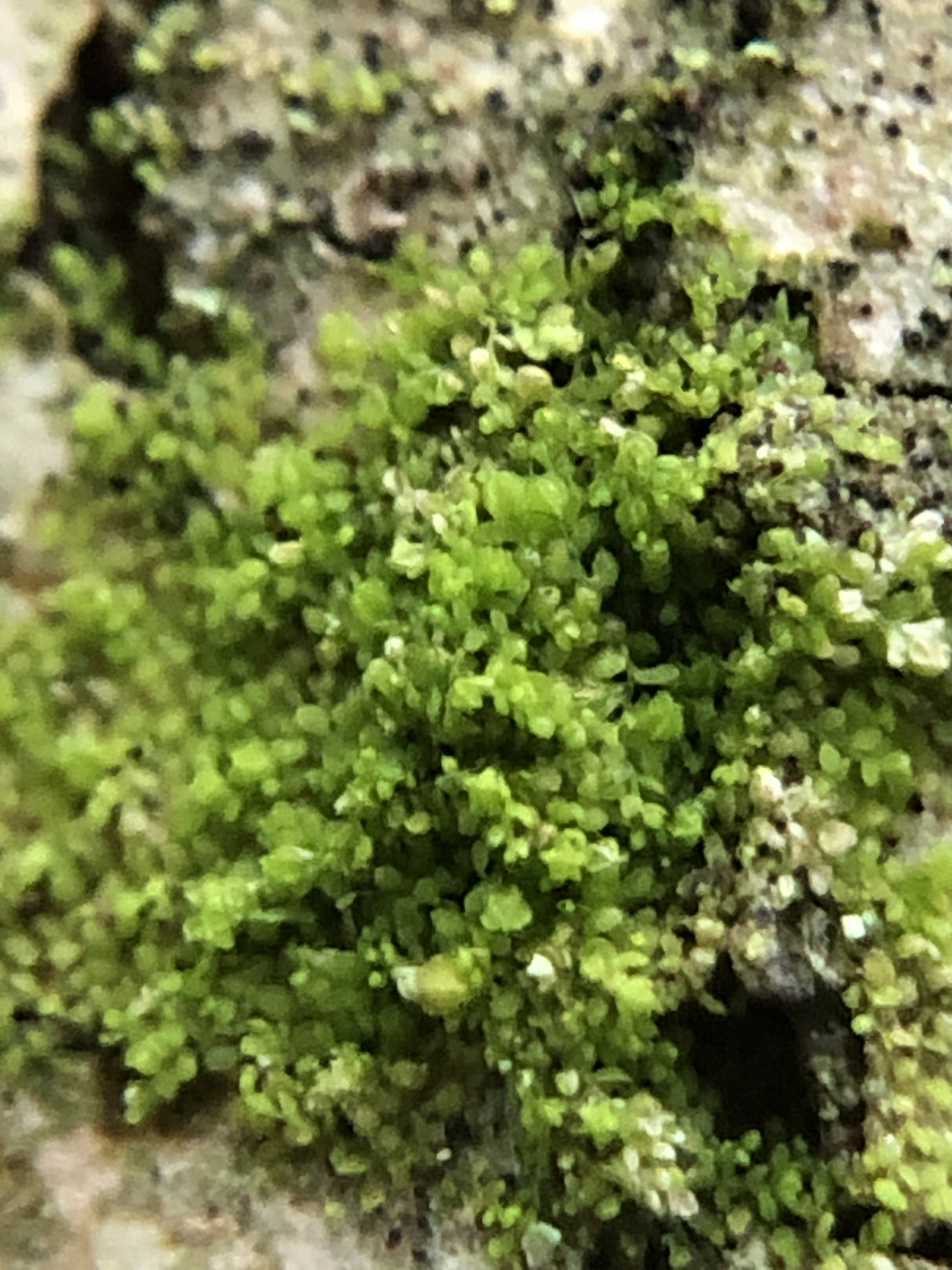
- Myriocoleopsis minutissima

Scientific classification
- Kingdom: Plantae
- Division: Marchantiophyta
- Class: Jungermanniopsida
- Subclass: Jungermanniidae
- Order: Lejeuneales
- Family: Lejeuneaceae
- Genus: Myriocoleopsis; Schiffn.

= Myriocoleopsis =

Genus of liverworts

Myriocoleopsis is a genus of liverwort in family Lejeuneaceae.

== Species ==
The following species are recognised in the genus Myriocoleopsis:

- Myriocoleopsis fluviatilis (Steph.) Reiner & Gradst.
- Myriocoleopsis gymnocolea (Spruce) M.E.Reiner & Gradst.
- Myriocoleopsis minutissima (Sm.) R.L.Zhu, Y.Yu & Pócs
- Myriocoleopsis vuquangensis (Pócs & Ninh) Pócs
