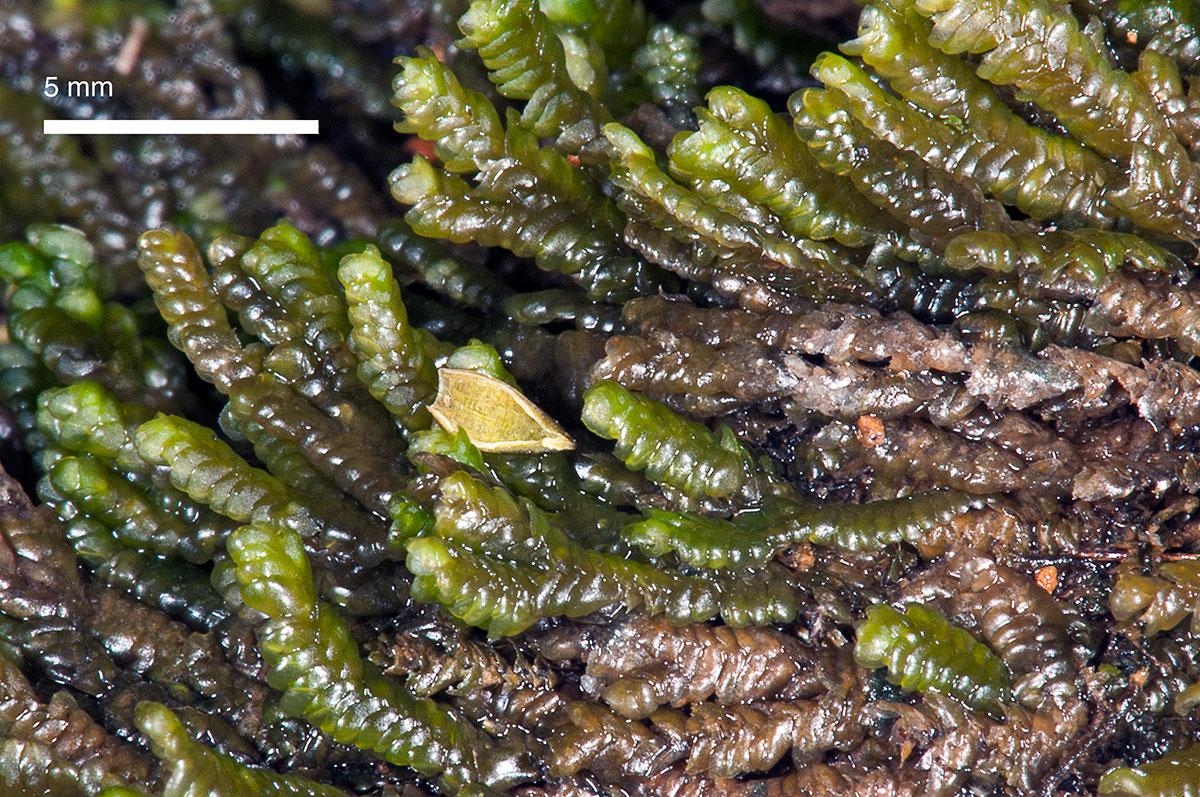
- Spruceanthus olivaceus

Scientific classification
- Kingdom: Plantae
- Division: Marchantiophyta
- Class: Jungermanniopsida
- Order: Lejeuneales
- Family: Lejeuneaceae
- Genus: Spruceanthus; Verd.

= Spruceanthus =

Genus of liverworts

Spruceanthus is a genus of liverwort in family Lejeuneaceae.

The genus was circumscribed by Frans Verdoorn in Ann. Bryol. Suppl. vol.4 on page 151 in 1934.

The genus name of Spruceanthus is in honour of Richard Spruce (1817–1893), who was an English botanist specializing in bryology. He was one of the great Victorian botanical explorers.

== Species ==
As accepted by GBIF;

- Spruceanthus abbreviatus (Mitt.) X.Q.Shi, R.L.Zhu & Gradst.
- Spruceanthus brachyanthus (J.B.Jack & Steph.) X.Q.Shi, R.L.Zhu & Gradst.
- Spruceanthus falcatus X.Q.Shi, R.L.Zhu & Gradst.
- Spruceanthus floreus (Mitt.) Sukkharak & Gradst.
- Spruceanthus kiushianus (Horik.) X.Q.Shi, R.L.Zhu & Gradst.
- Spruceanthus macrostipulus (Steph.) Gradst.
- Spruceanthus mamillilobulus (Herzog) Verd.
- Spruceanthus olivaceus (Hook.f. & Taylor) X.Q.Shi, R.L.Zhu & Gradst.
- Spruceanthus planifolius (Horik.) X.Q.Shi, R.L.Zhu & Gradst.
- Spruceanthus planiusculus (Mitt.) X.Q.Shi, R.L.Zhu & Gradst.
- Spruceanthus pluriplicatus (Steph.) Gradst.
- Spruceanthus polonicus Grolle
- Spruceanthus polymorphus (Sande Lac.) Verd.
- Spruceanthus semirepandus (Nees) Verd.
- Spruceanthus sulcatus (Nees) Gradst.
- Spruceanthus theobromae (Spruce) Gradst.
- Spruceanthus thozetianus (Gottsche & F.Muell.) B.M.Thiers & Gradst.
- Spruceanthus wiggintonii A.E.D.Daniels, Kariyappaa & P.Daniel
