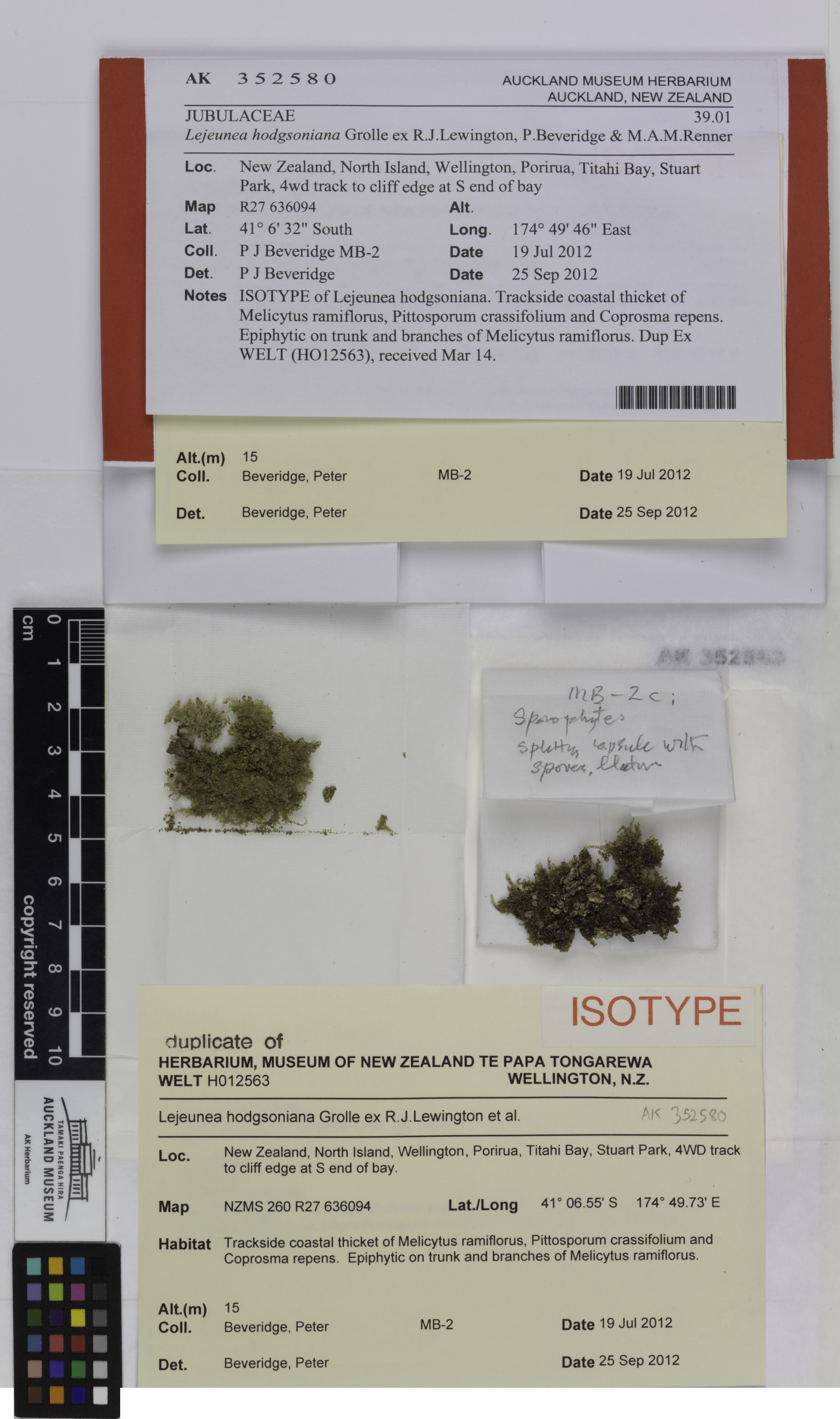

Scientific classification
- Kingdom: Plantae
- Division: Marchantiophyta
- Class: Jungermanniopsida
- Order: Lejeuneales
- Family: Lejeuneaceae
- Genus: Lejeunea
- Species: L. hodgsoniana

Binomial name
- Lejeunea hodgsoniana Grolle ex R.J.Lewington, P.Beveridge & M.A.M.Renner, 2013

= Lejeunea hodgsoniana =

Species of liverwort

Lejeunea hodgsoniana is a species of liverwort in the family Lejeuneaceae. Endemic to New Zealand, it was first recognized in 1980 but not formally described until 2013. The plant forms bright green mats up to 7 cm (2.8 in) in diameter on tree bark and occasionally on rocks. The species is found from the Kermadec Islands in the north to the Chatham Islands in the south, primarily in coastal and lowland areas below 100 m (330 ft) elevation. It is distinguished from related species by its relatively large size, multi-celled tooth on the leaf lobule, and deeply divided underleaves with pointed tips. While showing a particular affinity for māhoe trees (Melicytus species), it grows on various native and introduced trees and is considered "Not Threatened" under the New Zealand Threat Classification System due to its abundance within its range and ability to grow in both pristine and disturbed habitats.

== Taxonomy ==
Lejeunea hodgsoniana was first recognised as a distinct species in 1980 by the German bryologist Riclef Grolle, who annotated several specimens at the Museum of New Zealand Te Papa Tongarewa (WELT) with this name. However, Grolle never formally published a description of the species. Over the following decades, botanists informally referred to these plants using the provisional name "Lejeunea 'hodgsoniana' Grolle ined." The species was finally formally described in 2013 by Rodney J. Lewington, Peter Beveridge, and Matt A.M. Renner, who maintained Grolle's chosen species epithet. The species name hodgsoniana honours the New Zealand botanist Amy Hodgson (1888–1983), who made contributions to the study of New Zealand liverworts through her numerous publications between 1941 and 1972. While Hodgson never worked directly with the Lejeuneaceae, she published important studies on several other liverwort genera including Schistochila, Heteroscyphus, and Radula.

Lejeunea hodgsoniana is one of fourteen Lejeunea species known from New Zealand, seven of which are considered endemic to the region. This relatively high rate of endemism in New Zealand's Lejeunea species reflects a pattern also seen in related genera, suggesting the existence of a distinct southern-temperate Australasian element within the predominantly tropical Lejeuneaceae. The species is morphologically distinctive among Australasian Lejeunea species, though it shares some characteristics with two Asian species, L. bidentula and L. kodamae, particularly in having a multi-celled tooth on the leaf lobule. However, Lejeunea hodgsoniana can be distinguished from both these species by its larger size, differently shaped underleaves, and other structural details.

== Description ==
Lejeunea hodgsoniana is a small liverwort that forms bright green, circular or extensive mats on tree bark and occasionally on rocks. These mats can reach up to 7 cm (2.8 in) in diameter, though they may become larger when different patches grow together. The plant becomes grey-green when dried and preserved in herbarium collections. The main stems are 1.0–1.5 millimeters (mm) wide and about 12 mm long, with frequent branching. The branches grow in a flattened pattern, creating thin, spread-out layers of growth. The stem is composed of an outer layer of 7 protective cells surrounding approximately 12 rows of smaller inner cells.

The leaves are arranged in an overlapping pattern along the stem. Each leaf has two parts: a larger upper lobe and a smaller lower lobe (called a lobule). The upper lobes are broadly egg-shaped and lie flat, giving the plant its characteristic flattened appearance. These lobes measure 0.75–0.95 mm long and 0.55–0.65 mm wide on main stems, with smaller sizes on branches. A distinctive feature of this species is the small, triangular tooth-like projection on the lower lobe, which is made up of multiple cells – unusual among related species.

The underleaves (modified leaves on the lower surface of the stem) are spaced apart from each other and oval-shaped, with two long, narrow lobes that typically end in a single pointed cell. These underleaves are attached to the stem by three cells and often produce clusters of root-like structures called rhizoids that help anchor the plant.

When reproducing, L. hodgsoniana produces both male and female reproductive structures on the same plant (making it autoicous). The male structures occur in small clusters, while the female structures develop into a protective flask-shaped covering (perianth) that houses the developing spore capsule. The perianth has five ridges or keels, with the upper ridge being less prominent than the others. When mature, the spore capsule splits into four parts to release light brown, elliptical spores that measure 32.5–37.5 by 17.5–20 micrometres.

The species can be distinguished from similar liverworts by its relatively large size, the distinctive multi-celled tooth on its lower leaf lobes, and its deeply divided underleaves with pointed tips.

== Distribution and habitat ==
Lejeunea hodgsoniana is found throughout New Zealand, with a range extending from the Kermadec Islands in the north (29°S) to Pitt Island in the Chatham Islands in the south (44°S). It primarily occurs in coastal and lowland areas, typically at elevations below 100 m (330 ft), though it has been found as high as 520 m (1,710 ft) above sea level in the Kermadec Islands. The species is particularly well-represented in the northern half of New Zealand's North Island, where it occurs on numerous offshore islands including the Poor Knights Islands, islands of the Hauraki Gulf (such as Little Barrier Island), and the Mercury Islands. On the mainland, it has been recorded from North Cape southward to Port Waikato and Hamilton. In the southern North Island, it is mainly found in coastal areas around Wellington, including the eco-sanctuary Zealandia. The species has only one known location in the South Island, at the base of Farewell Spit.

Lejeunea hodgsoniana grows primarily on tree bark in coastal forests and scrubland. It shows a particular affinity for māhoe trees (Melicytus species), being found on Melicytus ramiflorus throughout most of its range, M. chathamicus in the Chatham Islands, and M. aff. ramiflorus in the Kermadec Islands. However, it has been recorded growing on a wide variety of other native and introduced trees, including pūriri (Vitex lucens), karaka (Corynocarpus laevigatus), and even apple trees (Malus domestica).

While primarily found on tree bark, the species occasionally grows on shaded rocks, particularly in stream beds. It has been found on various rock types including serpentinite, basalt, and basaltic andesite. The species often grows alongside other small liverworts and mosses, forming mixed communities of bryophytes.

== Conservation ==
Despite its relatively restricted geographic range, L. hodgsoniana is considered "Not Threatened" under the New Zealand Threat Classification System. This classification reflects its abundance within its range and its ability to grow in both pristine and disturbed habitats, including forest edges, riparian vegetation, successional forest, and floodplain scrub. The species can be found in both highly modified remnant forests and undisturbed stands of native vegetation.
