= Bryopteris =

Scientific classification
- Kingdom: Plantae
- Division: Marchantiophyta
- Class: Jungermanniopsida
- Order: Lejeuneales
- Family: Lejeuneaceae
- Genus: Bryopteris (Nees) Lindenb.

Species
- See text

Synonyms
- Bryolejeunea (Spruce) Lacout

Genus of liverworts

Bryopteris is a genus of liverworts in family Lejeuneaceae.

They are mainly found in central and southern America, as well as Madagascar, parts of Africa and tropical Asia.

== Species ==
As accepted by GBIF;

- Bryopteris bispinosa Grolle
- Bryopteris diffusa (Sw.) Nees
- Bryopteris filicina (Sw.) Nees
- Bryopteris fissiloba Steph.
- Bryopteris gaudichaudii Gottsche
- Bryopteris longispica (Spruce) Stephani
- Bryopteris succinea Grolle
