= Drepanolejeunea =

Scientific classification
- Kingdom: Plantae
- Division: Marchantiophyta
- Class: Jungermanniopsida
- Subclass: Jungermanniidae
- Order: Lejeuneales
- Family: Lejeuneaceae
- Genus: Drepanolejeunea (Spruce) Schiffn.

Synonyms
- Falcijeunea Kuntze; Ophthalmolejeunea (R.M.Schust.) R.M.Schust.

Genus of liverworts

Drepanolejeunea is a genus of liverworts belonging to the family Lejeuneaceae.

The genus has almost cosmopolitan distribution, except central Asia, Russia and Canada.

== Species ==
As accepted by GBIF;

- Drepanolejeunea actinogyna Inuthai, R.L.Zhu & Chantanaorr.
- Drepanolejeunea aculeata Bischl.
- Drepanolejeunea anderssonii (Ångstr.) A.Evans
- Drepanolejeunea andina Herzog
- Drepanolejeunea angustifolia (Mitt.) Grolle
- Drepanolejeunea ankasica E.W.Jones
- Drepanolejeunea anoplantha (Spruce) Steph.
- Drepanolejeunea apiculata Horik.
- Drepanolejeunea appalachiana R.M.Schust.
- Drepanolejeunea araucariae Steph.
- Drepanolejeunea asymmetrica Horik.
- Drepanolejeunea aucklandica Steph.
- Drepanolejeunea aurita Bischl.
- Drepanolejeunea bakeri Herzog
- Drepanolejeunea bidens (Prantl) A.Evans
- Drepanolejeunea bidens Stephani
- Drepanolejeunea bidoupensis Pócs
- Drepanolejeunea biocellata A.Evans
- Drepanolejeunea bischlerae (Grolle) Grolle & R.L.Zhu
- Drepanolejeunea bispinulosa A.Evans
- Drepanolejeunea blumei Steph.
- Drepanolejeunea brunnea Mizut.
- Drepanolejeunea caledonica Steph.
- Drepanolejeunea cambouenea Stephani
- Drepanolejeunea campanulata (Spruce) Steph.
- Drepanolejeunea canceroides H.A.Mill. & Bonner
- Drepanolejeunea capensis Stephani
- Drepanolejeunea capulata (Taylor) J.B.Jack & Steph.
- Drepanolejeunea chiponensis Horik.
- Drepanolejeunea ciliata Mizut.
- Drepanolejeunea clavicornis Stephani
- Drepanolejeunea claviformis Stephani
- Drepanolejeunea commutata Grolle & R.L.Zhu
- Drepanolejeunea crassiretis A.Evans
- Drepanolejeunea crucianella (Taylor) A.Evans
- Drepanolejeunea cultrella (Mitt.) Steph.
- Drepanolejeunea cutervoensis (Loitl.) Grolle
- Drepanolejeunea cyclops (Sande Lac.) Grolle & R.L.Zhu
- Drepanolejeunea dactylophora (Nees, Lindenb. & Gottsche) J.B.Jack & Steph.
- Drepanolejeunea decurviloba Steph.
- Drepanolejeunea dentistipula Steph.
- Drepanolejeunea deslooveri Vanden Berghen
- Drepanolejeunea devendrae Sushil K.Singh & M.Dey
- Drepanolejeunea dissitifolia A.Evans
- Drepanolejeunea eggersiana Stephani
- Drepanolejeunea elegans Herzog
- Drepanolejeunea eogena Grolle
- Drepanolejeunea erecta (Steph.) Mizut.
- Drepanolejeunea evansii Bischl. ex L.Söderstr., A.Hagborg & von Konrat
- Drepanolejeunea fissicornua Steph.
- Drepanolejeunea fleischeri (Steph.) Grolle & R.L.Zhu
- Drepanolejeunea foliicola Horik.
- Drepanolejeunea formosana Horik.
- Drepanolejeunea fragilis Bischl. ex L.Söderstr., A.Hagborg & von Konrat
- Drepanolejeunea fulfordiae L.Söderstr.
- Drepanolejeunea glimeae R.L.Zhu & Mohamed
- Drepanolejeunea gomphiae Stephani
- Drepanolejeunea granatensis (Prantl) Bischl.
- Drepanolejeunea grandis Herzog
- Drepanolejeunea grollei M.E.Reiner & Schäf.-Verw.
- Drepanolejeunea grossidens Steph.
- Drepanolejeunea grossidentata Horik.
- Drepanolejeunea hamatifolia (Hook.) Schiffn.
- Drepanolejeunea hampeana Steph.
- Drepanolejeunea hamulata Steph.
- Drepanolejeunea helenae Pócs
- Drepanolejeunea herzogii R.L.Zhu & M.L.So
- Drepanolejeunea inchoata (C.F.W.Meissn.) Steph.
- Drepanolejeunea inchoata (Meisn.) Schiffn.
- Drepanolejeunea infundibulata (Spruce) A.Evans
- Drepanolejeunea integerrima Herzog
- Drepanolejeunea integribracteata Bischl.
- Drepanolejeunea intermedia Zwickel
- Drepanolejeunea intorta (Besch. & Spruce) Stephani
- Drepanolejeunea japonica Horik.
- Drepanolejeunea laciniata Qiong He & R.L.Zhu
- Drepanolejeunea laevis (Mitt.) Steph.
- Drepanolejeunea lancifolia (Gottsche) J.B.Jack & Steph.
- Drepanolejeunea latifolia (Herzog) R.M.Schust.
- Drepanolejeunea leiboldiana (Gottsche) Stephani
- Drepanolejeunea levicornua Steph.
- Drepanolejeunea lichenicola (Spruce) Steph.
- Drepanolejeunea longicornua (Herzog) Mizut.
- Drepanolejeunea longicruris (Steph.) Grolle & R.L.Zhu
- Drepanolejeunea longifolia Ajit P.Singh & V.Nath
- Drepanolejeunea longii Grolle & R.L.Zhu
- Drepanolejeunea longirostris (Spruce) Stephani
- Drepanolejeunea lyrata Grolle
- Drepanolejeunea macrodonta (Mitt.) Steph.
- Drepanolejeunea madagascariensis (Steph.) Grolle
- Drepanolejeunea mauritiana Tixier
- Drepanolejeunea mawtmiana Ajit P.Singh & V.Nath
- Drepanolejeunea microcarpa Pearson
- Drepanolejeunea minima Stephani
- Drepanolejeunea mizoramensis Sushil K.Singh
- Drepanolejeunea molleri Stephani
- Drepanolejeunea moluccensis Herzog
- Drepanolejeunea monophthalma (Herzog) Mizut.
- Drepanolejeunea mosenii (Steph.) Bischl.
- Drepanolejeunea navicularis Stephani
- Drepanolejeunea nymanii Steph.
- Drepanolejeunea obliqua Steph.
- Drepanolejeunea obtriangulata T.Kodama
- Drepanolejeunea orthophylla (Nees & Mont.) Bischl.
- Drepanolejeunea palmifolia (Nees) Schiffn.
- Drepanolejeunea papillosa S.W.Arnell
- Drepanolejeunea pentadactyla (Mont.) Steph.
- Drepanolejeunea perissodonta (Spruce) Bischl.
- Drepanolejeunea physaefolia (Gottsche) Stephani
- Drepanolejeunea physifolia (Gottsche) Pearson
- Drepanolejeunea pinnatiloba Schiffn.
- Drepanolejeunea pleiodictya Herzog
- Drepanolejeunea pocsii Grolle
- Drepanolejeunea polyrhiza (Nees) Grolle & R.L.Zhu
- Drepanolejeunea propagulifera Herzog
- Drepanolejeunea pseudoneura (A.Evans) Grolle
- Drepanolejeunea pterocalyx (Herzog) Bischl.
- Drepanolejeunea pulla (Mitt.) Grolle
- Drepanolejeunea punctulata (Spruce) Stephani
- Drepanolejeunea pungens Bischl.
- Drepanolejeunea ramentiflora Steph.
- Drepanolejeunea robinsonii C.E.Zartman & A.M.Sierra
- Drepanolejeunea ruandensis Vanden Berghen
- Drepanolejeunea sabaliana R.M.Schust.
- Drepanolejeunea securifolia (Gottsche) Stephani
- Drepanolejeunea senticosa Bischl.
- Drepanolejeunea serricalyx Herzog
- Drepanolejeunea serrulata Horik.
- Drepanolejeunea siamensis (Bischl.) Grolle & R.L.Zhu
- Drepanolejeunea sikkimensis (Udar & U.S.Awasthi) Grolle
- Drepanolejeunea spicata (Steph.) Grolle & R.L.Zhu
- Drepanolejeunea spinosa Herzog
- Drepanolejeunea spinosocornuta Steph.
- Drepanolejeunea squarrosula Herzog
- Drepanolejeunea subacuta (Horik.) H.A.Mill., Bonner & Bischl.
- Drepanolejeunea subdissitifolia Herzog
- Drepanolejeunea submuricata R.M.Schust.
- Drepanolejeunea subquadrata (Mitt.) Steph.
- Drepanolejeunea subvittata (Herzog) Grolle
- Drepanolejeunea symoensii Vanden Berghen & Grolle
- Drepanolejeunea szechuanica P.C.Chen
- Drepanolejeunea tenax K.I.Goebel
- Drepanolejeunea tenera K.I.Goebel
- Drepanolejeunea tenuioides Horik.
- Drepanolejeunea tenuis (Reinw., Blume & Nees) Schiffner
- Drepanolejeunea ternatensis (Gottsche) Schiffn.
- Drepanolejeunea teysmannii (Gottsche) Steph.
- Drepanolejeunea thwaitesiana (Mitt.) Steph.
- Drepanolejeunea tibetana (P.C.Wu & J.S.Lou) Grolle & R.L.Zhu
- Drepanolejeunea trematodes (Nees) Bischl.
- Drepanolejeunea tricornua Herzog
- Drepanolejeunea tridactyla (Gottsche) Steph.
- Drepanolejeunea trigonophylla Steph.
- Drepanolejeunea tristaniana S.W.Arnell
- Drepanolejeunea tuyamae S.Hatt.
- Drepanolejeunea ualanensis Inoue & H.A.Mill.
- Drepanolejeunea ungulata (Steph.) Grolle
- Drepanolejeunea urceolata R.M.Schust.
- Drepanolejeunea valiae Jovet-Ast
- Drepanolejeunea vandenberghenii Buchb. & Eb.Fisch.
- Drepanolejeunea vesiculosa (Mitt.) Steph.
- Drepanolejeunea yoshinagana Mizut.
- Drepanolejeunea yulensis Steph.
- Drepanolejeunea yunnanensis (P.C.Chen) Grolle & R.L.Zhu
