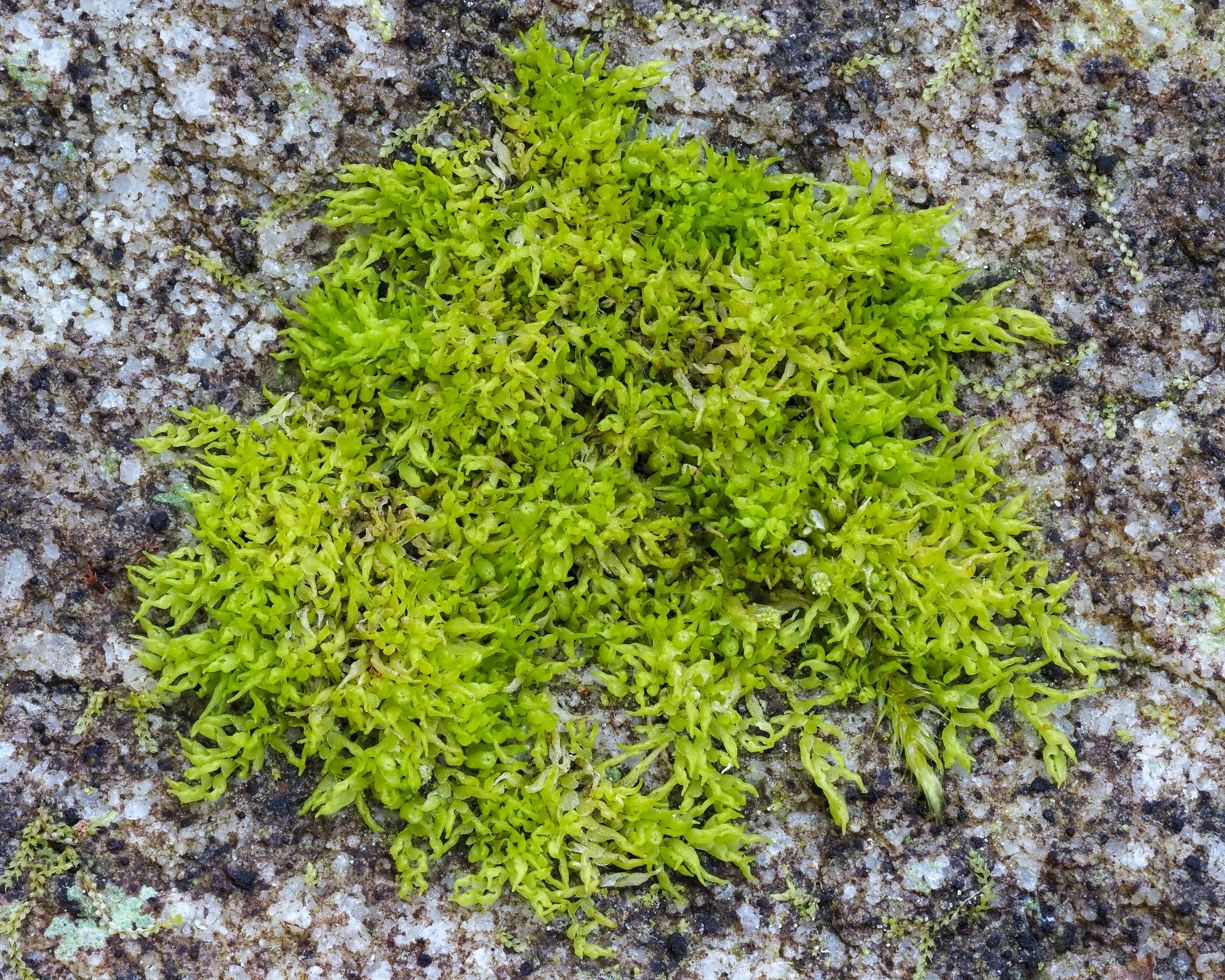
- Colura tenuicornis

Scientific classification
- Kingdom: Plantae
- Clade: Embryophytes
- Division: Marchantiophyta
- Class: Jungermanniopsida
- Order: Lejeuneales
- Family: Lejeuneaceae
- Genus: Colura (Dumort.) Dumort.

Type species
- Jungermannia calyptrifolia Hook.

Species
- Approximately 60, see text

Synonyms
- Lejeunea sect. Colura Dumort.; Lejeunea subgen. Colurolejeunea Spruce; Colurolejeunea (Spruce) Steph.; Myriocolea Spruce; Mitrojeunea Kuntze

= Colura =

Genus of liverworts

Colura is a genus of epiphytic type of liverworts and consists of approximately 80-90 species, that are distributed generally in the tropics.

Species in this genus are no larger than a couple millimetres in size and may possess small water sac organs formed from fused leaf margins that trap small ciliates. It is because of this trapping mechanism that some species have been suspected of carnivory, even as early as 1893. One such species, Colura zoophaga, was the subject of a study that aimed to investigate the assumed carnivorous habit among liverworts. The results confirmed that ciliates were captured and died within the water sac traps, which are not unlike the bladder traps of Utricularia. Whether the species attract, digest, or absorb the prey has not been confirmed, however. The epiphytic habit of the genus, requiring all nutrients to be acquired from rainwater, is similar to the habit of known carnivorous plants.

== Species ==
98 species are accepted by GBIF (as of June 2023);

- Colura acroloba (Prantl) Jovet-Ast
- Colura amboinensis Steph.
- Colura andoi Gradst. & Jovet-Ast
- Colura apiculata (Schiffn.) Steph.
- Colura ari (Steph.) Steph.
- Colura australiensis Jovet-Ast
- Colura benoistii Jovet-Ast
- Colura berghenii Jovet-Ast
- Colura bicornis Jovet-Ast
- Colura bisvoluta Herzog & Jovet-Ast
- Colura brevistyla Herzog
- Colura bulbosa Herzog
- Colura calderae Pócs
- Colura calyptrifolia (Hook.) Dumort.
- Colura clavigera Gottsche ex Jovet-Ast
- Colura clementis Grolle
- Colura conica (Sande Lac.) K.I.Goebel
- Colura corniantha Grolle
- Colura corynephora (Gottsche, Lindenb. & Nees) Trevis.
- Colura corynophora (Nees, Lindenb. & Gottsche) Trevis.
- Colura crenulata Grolle
- Colura crispiloba Jovet-Ast
- Colura cristata Jovet-Ast
- Colura cylindrica Herzog
- Colura cymbalifera Herzog & Jovet-Ast
- Colura denticulata Jovet-Ast
- Colura digitalis (Mitt.) Steph.
- Colura dusenii Steph.
- Colura fastigiata Jovet-Ast
- Colura fistulosa Jovet-Ast
- Colura galeata Jovet-Ast
- Colura greig-smithii Jovet-Ast
- Colura hattoriana Pócs
- Colura hedbergiana Pócs
- Colura heimii Jovet-Ast
- Colura hemisphaerica Jovet-Ast
- Colura herzogii Jovet-Ast
- Colura hirta Steph.
- Colura humbertii Jovet-Ast
- Colura imperfecta Steph.
- Colura inflata K.I.Goebel
- Colura inornata Jovet-Ast
- Colura inuii Horik.
- Colura involvens (Nees & Mont.) Trevis.
- Colura irrorata (Spruce) Heinrichs, Y.Yu, Schäf.-Verw. & Pócs
- Colura itatyana Steph.
- Colura javanica Stephani
- Colura jovet-astiae Grolle
- Colura junghuhniana (Prantl) Steph.
- Colura karstenii K.I.Goebel
- Colura kilimanjarica Pocs & Jovet-Ast
- Colura koponenii Pócs
- Colura leratii (Steph.) Steph., 1916
- Colura lingua B.Thiers
- Colura mauritiana Pócs
- Colura maxima Jovet-Ast
- Colura medusa J.Eggers & Pócs
- Colura meijeri Jovet-Ast
- Colura mizutanii Pócs
- Colura mosenii Steph.
- Colura naumannii (Schiffn.) Steph.
- Colura norrisii Pócs
- Colura obesa Jovet-Ast
- Colura obvoluta Jovet-Ast
- Colura ornata K.I.Goebel
- Colura ornithocephala Herzog
- Colura palawanensis Jovet-Ast
- Colura pallida Steph.
- Colura patagonica Jovet-Ast
- Colura pluridentata Jovet-Ast
- Colura pseudocalyptrifolia Horik.
- Colura pulcherrima Jovet-Ast
- Colura queenslandica B.M.Thiers
- Colura rhynchophora Jovet-Ast
- Colura saccophylla E.A.Hodgs. & Herzog
- Colura saroltae Pócs
- Colura schusteri Grolle
- Colura siamensis Jovet-Ast
- Colura simplicior Jovet-Ast
- Colura speciosa Jovet-Ast
- Colura streimannii Pócs
- Colura strophiolata Jovet-Ast
- Colura superba (Mont.) Steph.
- Colura tenuicornis (A.Evans) Steph.
- Colura thomeensis Pócs
- Colura tixieri Jovet-Ast
- Colura tortifolia (Nees & Mont.) Trevis.
- Colura tutuilana (Pearson) H.A.Mill.
- Colura ulei Jovet-Ast
- Colura undulata (Lindenb. & Gottsche) Trevis.
- Colura usambarica E.W.Jones
- Colura valida Jovet-Ast
- Colura verdoornii Herzog & Jovet-Ast
- Colura vietnamensis Jovet-Ast & Tixier
- Colura vitiensis Pócs & J.Eggers
- Colura zoophaga Eb.Fisch.
