= Caudalejeunea =

Scientific classification
- Kingdom: Plantae
- Division: Marchantiophyta
- Class: Jungermanniopsida
- Order: Lejeuneales
- Family: Lejeuneaceae
- Genus: Caudalejeunea (Steph.) Schiffn.

Genus of liverworts

Caudalejeunea is a genus of liverwort in family Lejeuneaceae.

It has a cosmopolitan distribution, mainly in the tropics.

== Species ==
As accepted by GBIF;

- Caudalejeunea acutifolia Gerola
- Caudalejeunea africana (Steph.) Schiffn.
- Caudalejeunea cristiloba (Steph.) Gradst.
- Caudalejeunea dusenii Steph.
- Caudalejeunea grolleana Gradst.
- Caudalejeunea hanningtonii (Mitt.) Schiffn.
- Caudalejeunea katangensis Vanden Berghen
- Caudalejeunea lehmanniana (Gottsche) A.Evans
- Caudalejeunea lewallei Vanden Berghen
- Caudalejeunea mauritiana Horik.
- Caudalejeunea pluriplicata Udar, U.S.Awasthi & Shaheen
- Caudalejeunea recurvistipula (Gottsche) Schiffner
- Caudalejeunea reniloba (Gottsche) Steph.
- Caudalejeunea revoluta Herzog
- Caudalejeunea serrata Stephani
- Caudalejeunea streimannii Gyarmati
- Caudalejeunea yangambiensis (Vanden Berghen) E.W.Jones
- Caudalejeunea zenkeri Stephani
