= Hélène Bischler =

French botanist and bryologist

Hélène Bischler-Causse (3 January 1932 in Bern – 12 February 2005 in Paris) was a French botanist and bryologist, best known for her research and description of neotropical liverworts, the Marchantiales genera, and plagiochasma. She was the recipient of the P. Bertrand Prize from the French Academy of Sciences in 1974, and the Geneva Sayre Prize from Harvard University in 1985.
