= Luteolejeunea =

Scientific classification
- Kingdom: Plantae
- Division: Marchantiophyta
- Class: Jungermanniopsida
- Subclass: Jungermanniidae
- Order: Lejeuneales
- Family: Lejeuneaceae
- Genus: Luteolejeunea; Piippo

Synonyms
- Stictolejeunea herzogii Buchloh

Genus of liverworts

Luteolejeunea is a monotypic genus of liverwort in family Lejeuneaceae. It only contains the one species, Luteolejeunea herzogii (Buchloch) Piippo.

It is only found in Central America and northern parts of South America.
