= Raddi =

Raddi is a surname. Notable people with the surname include:

- Giuseppe Raddi (1770–1829), Italian botanist and curator
- Al-Saddiq Al-Raddi (born 1969), Sudanese writer and poet
