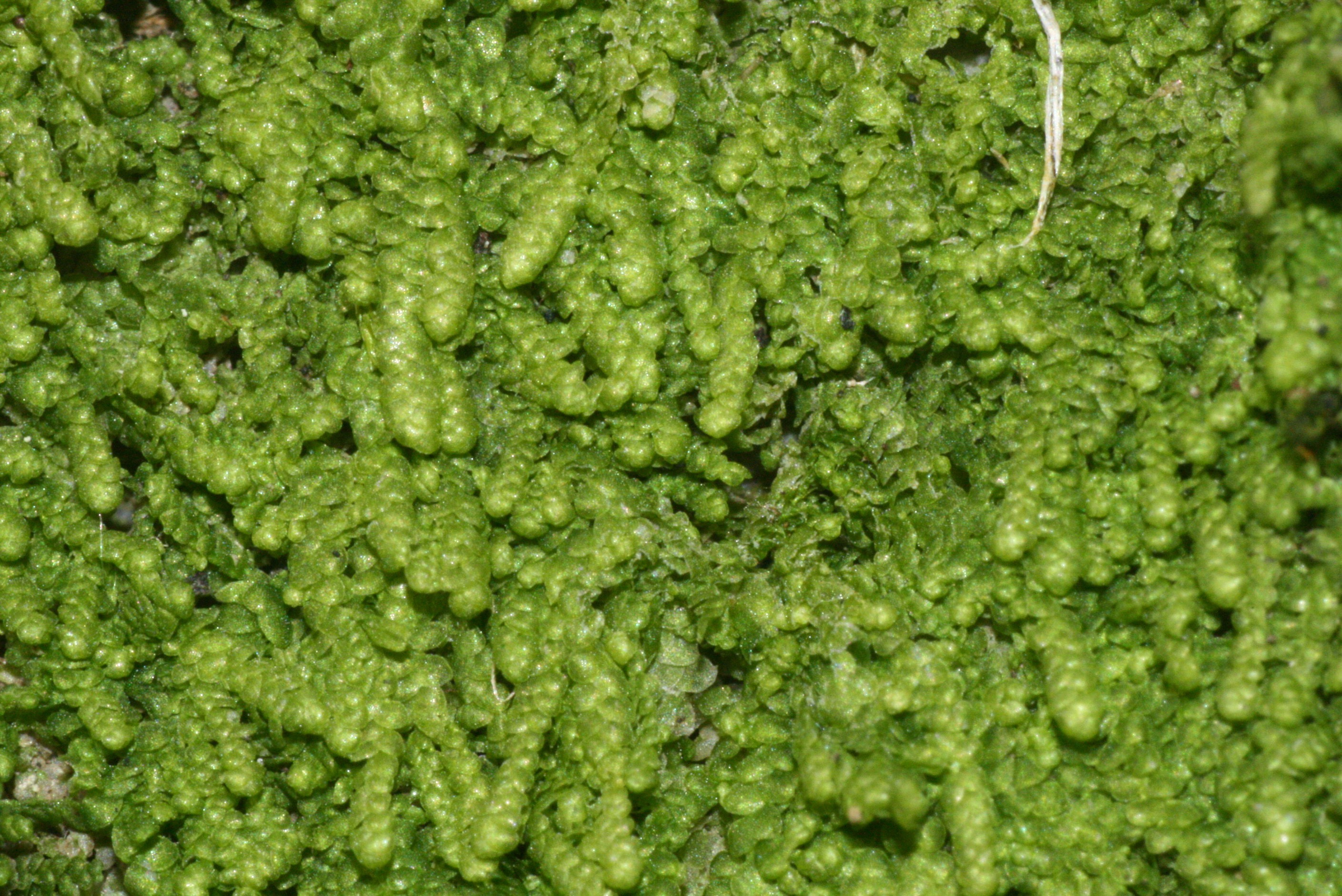

Scientific classification
- Kingdom: Plantae
- Division: Marchantiophyta
- Class: Jungermanniopsida
- Order: Lejeuneales
- Family: Lejeuneaceae
- Genus: Lejeunea
- Species: L. cavifolia

Binomial name
- Lejeunea cavifolia (Ehrh.) Lindb.

= Lejeunea cavifolia =

Species of liverwort

Lejeunea cavifolia is a species of liverwort belonging to the family Lejeuneaceae.

Synonym:

- Jungermannia cavifolia Ehrh.
