= T. K. G. Herzog =

German botanist and university teacher (1880–1961)

Theodor Carl (Karl) Julius Herzog (7 July 1880, Freiburg im Breisgau – 6 May 1961, Jena) was a German bryologist and phytogeographer. The standard author abbreviation Herzog is used to indicate this person as the author when citing a botanical name.

== Biography ==
He studied sciences in Freiburg and Zurich, obtaining his doctorate in 1903 from the Ludwig-Maximilians-Universität München as a student of botanist Ludwig Radlkofer (1829-1927). Later on, he obtained his habilitation at the Federal Polytechnic School in Zurich under the sponsorship of Carl Joseph Schröter (1855-1939).

From 1904 to 1912, he was engaged in a series of botanical excursions; Sardinia (1904 and 1906), Ceylon (1905 and 1908) and Bolivia (1907–08 and 1910–12). In 1920 he became an associate professor of botany at the Ludwig-Maximilians-Universität München, and later succeeded Wilhelm Detmer (1850-1930) at the University of Jena (1925), where he remained until 1948.

He was a leading authority of mosses, and also dealt with the systematics and phytogeography of flowering plants. As his career progressed, he focused more of his attention towards the classification of liverworts, in particular the family Lejeuneaceae.

The plant specific terms herzogiana and herzogii bear his name; two examples being: Frullania herzogiana and Luteolejeunea herzogii.

Also named in his honour; Herzogiella Broth.(1925), which is a genus of mosses belonging to the family Hypnaceae. Then Herzogianthaceae, which is a family of liverworts belonging to the order Ptilidiales, that family consists of only one genus: Herzogianthus R.M.Schust.(1960). Later published were, Herzogiaria (1981), and Herzogobryum (1963), which are both genera of liverworts.

== Principal works ==
- Vom Urwald zu den Gletschern der Kordillere, 1913 – From the jungles to the glaciers of the Cordillera.
- Die Pflanzenwelt der bolivischen Anden und ihres östlichen Vorlandes, 1923 – Vegetation of the Bolivian Andes and its eastern foothills.
- Anatomie der Lebermosse, 1925 – Anatomy of liverworts.
- Bergfahrten in Südamerika, 1925 – Mountain ascents in South America.
- Geographie der moose, 1926 – Geography of mosses.
