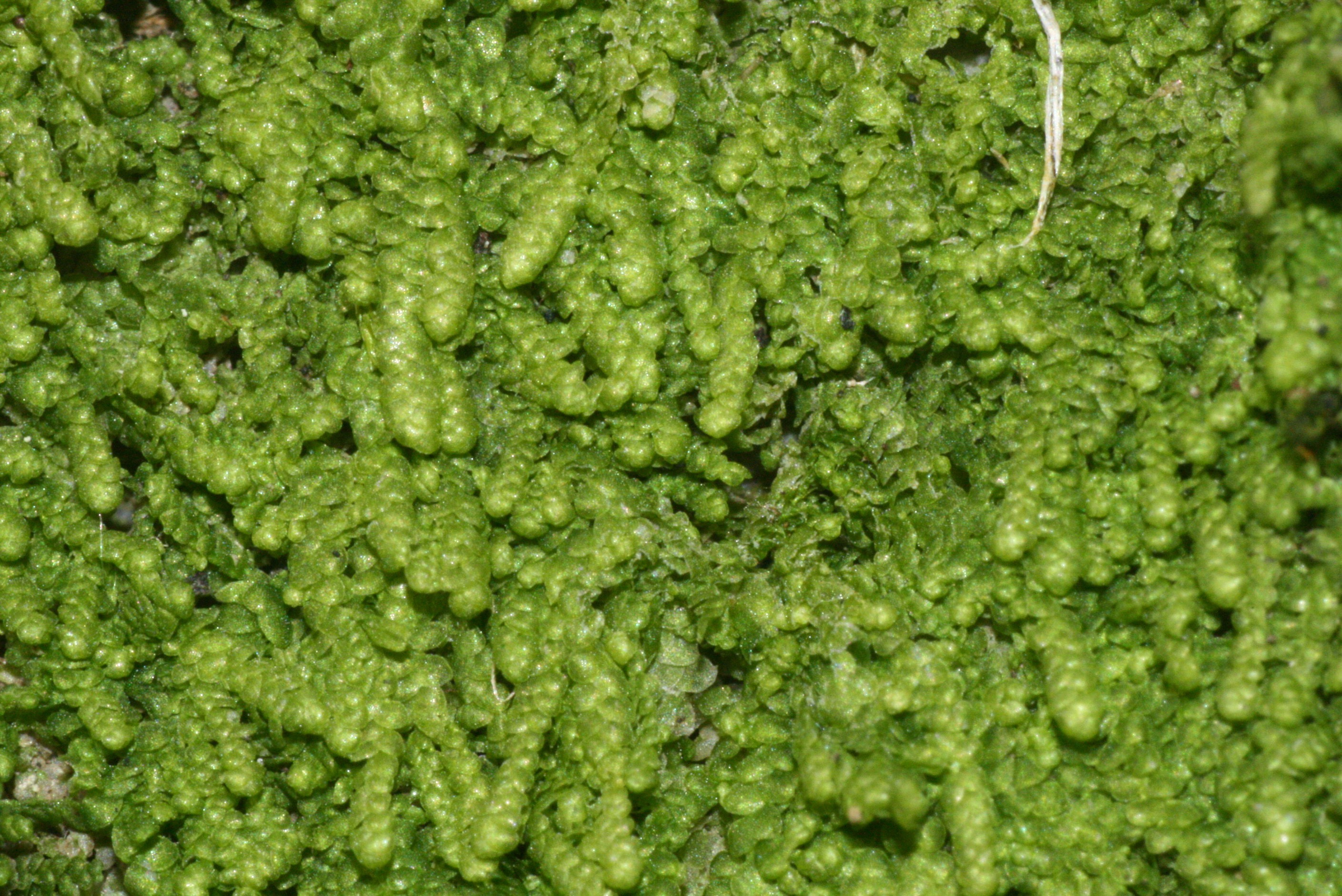
- Lejeunea cavifolia

Scientific classification
- Kingdom: Plantae
- Division: Marchantiophyta
- Class: Jungermanniopsida
- Subclass: Jungermanniidae
- Order: Lejeuneales
- Family: Lejeuneaceae
- Genus: Lejeunea; Lib.

Type species
- Lejeunea serpillifolia Lib.

Species
- See text

Synonyms
- Amblyolejeunea Ast; Eulejeunea Steph.; Oryzolejeunea (R.M.Schust.) R.M.Schust.; Ptycholejeunea (Spruce) Steph.; Stylolejeunea Sim; Stylolejuenea

= Lejeunea =

Genus of liverworts

Lejeunea is a genus of leafy liverworts in the Lejeuneaceae family. The GBIF lists up to 592 species (as of October 2022), along with a worldwide distribution. World Flora Online lists up to 531 species (as of July 2023).

The genus was circumscribed by Marie-Anne Libert in Ann. Gen. Sci. Phys. vol.6 on page 372 in 1820.

The genus name of Lejeunea is in honour of Alexandre Louis Simon Lejeune (1779–1858), who was a Belgian physician and botanist.

== Selected species ==
- Lejeunea cavifolia (Ehrh.) Lindb.
- Lejeunea drehwaldii Heinrichs & Schäf.-Verw.
- Lejeunea flava (Sw.) Nees
- Lejeunea hodgsoniana
- Lejeunea sordida - Sri Lanka

See List of Lejeunea species
