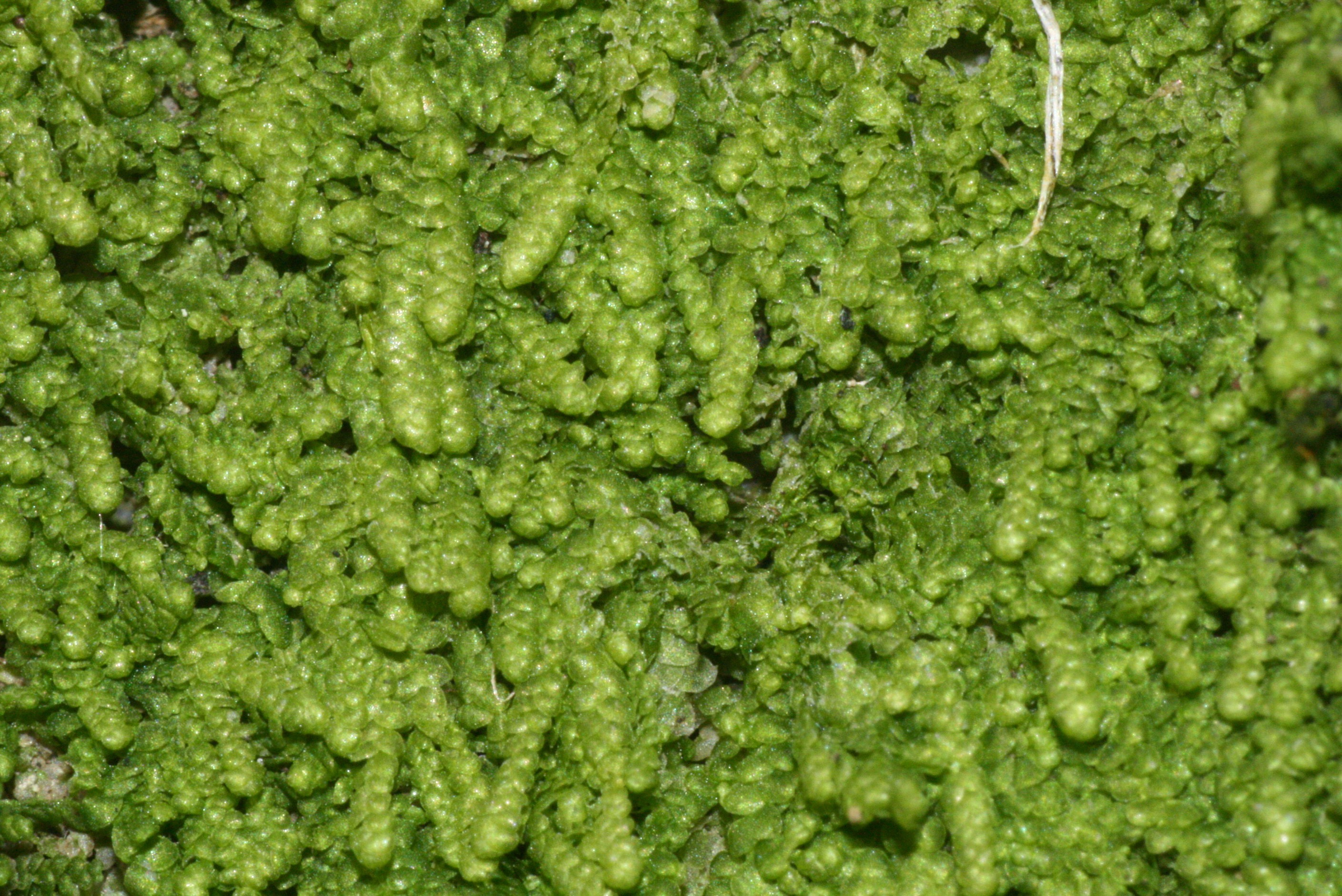
- Lejeunea cavifolia

Scientific classification
- Kingdom: Plantae
- Division: Marchantiophyta
- Class: Jungermanniopsida
- Order: Lejeuneales
- Family: Lejeuneaceae; Rostovzev

Genera
- See text

= Lejeuneaceae =

Family of liverworts

Lejeuneaceae is the largest family of liverworts. Most of its members are epiphytes found in the tropics, while others can be found in temperate regions.

The main characteristics of the family are that:

1. The leaves are incubous.
2. Amphigastrium is usually present, sometimes reduced.
3. Leaves are divided into lobe and lobule.
4. Archaegonium in a perianth.

Some large genera of the family are Lejeunea, Ceratolejeunea (around 84 species,) and Cheilolejeunea (around 275 species,).

== Taxonomy ==
The Lejeuneaceae are the largest family of liverworts with more than 1600 species, which equates to roughly 20% to 25% of all liverworts. These species are assigned to 95 genera.

=== List of genera ===
- Acanthocoleus
- Acantholejeunea
- Acrolejeunea
- Amphilejeunea
- Anoplolejeunea
- Aphanolejeunea
- Aphanotropis
- Archilejeunea
- Aureolejeunea
- Austrolejeunea
- Blepharolejeunea
- Brachiolejeunea
- Bromeliophila
- Bryopteris
- Calatholejeunea
- Capillolejeunea
- Caudalejeunea
- Cephalantholejeunea
- Cephalolejeunea
- Ceratolejeunea
- Cheilolejeunea
- Cladolejeunea
- Cololejeunea
- Colura
- Crossotolejeunea
- Cyclolejeunea
- Cyrtolejeunea
- Cystolejeunea
- Dactylolejeunea
- Dactylophorella
- Dendrolejeunea
- Dicladolejeunea
- Dicranolejeunea
- Diplasiolejeunea
- Drepanolejeunea
- Echinocolea
- Echinolejeunea
- Evansiolejeunea
- Frullanoides
- Fulfordianthus
- Haplolejeunea
- Harpalejeunea
- Hattoriolejeunea
- Kymatolejeunea
- Leiolejeunea
- Lejeunea
- Lepidolejeunea
- Leptolejeunea
- Leucolejeunea
- Lindigianthus
- Lopholejeunea
- Luteolejeunea
- Macrocolura
- Macrolejeunea
- Marchesinia
- Mastigolejeunea
- Metalejeunea
- Metzgeriopsis
- Microlejeunea
- Myriocolea
- Myriocoleopsis
- Nephelolejeunea
- Neurolejeunea
- Nipponolejeunea
- Odontolejeunea
- Omphalanthus
- Oryzolejeunea
- Otolejeunea
- Phaeolejeunea
- Physantholejeunea
- Pictolejeunea
- Pluvianthus
- Potamolejeunea
- Prionolejeunea
- Ptychanthus
- Pycnolejeunea
- Rectolejeunea
- Rhaphidolejeunea
- Schiffneriolejeunea
- Schusterolejeunea
- Siphonolejeunea
- Sphaerolejeunea, included in Lejeunea
- Spruceanthus
- Stenolejeunea
- Stictolejeunea
- Symbiezidium
- Taxilejeunea
- Thysananthus
- Trachylejeunea
- Trocholejeunea
- Tuyamaella
- Tuzibeanthus
- Verdoornianthus
- Vitalianthus
- Yanoella
