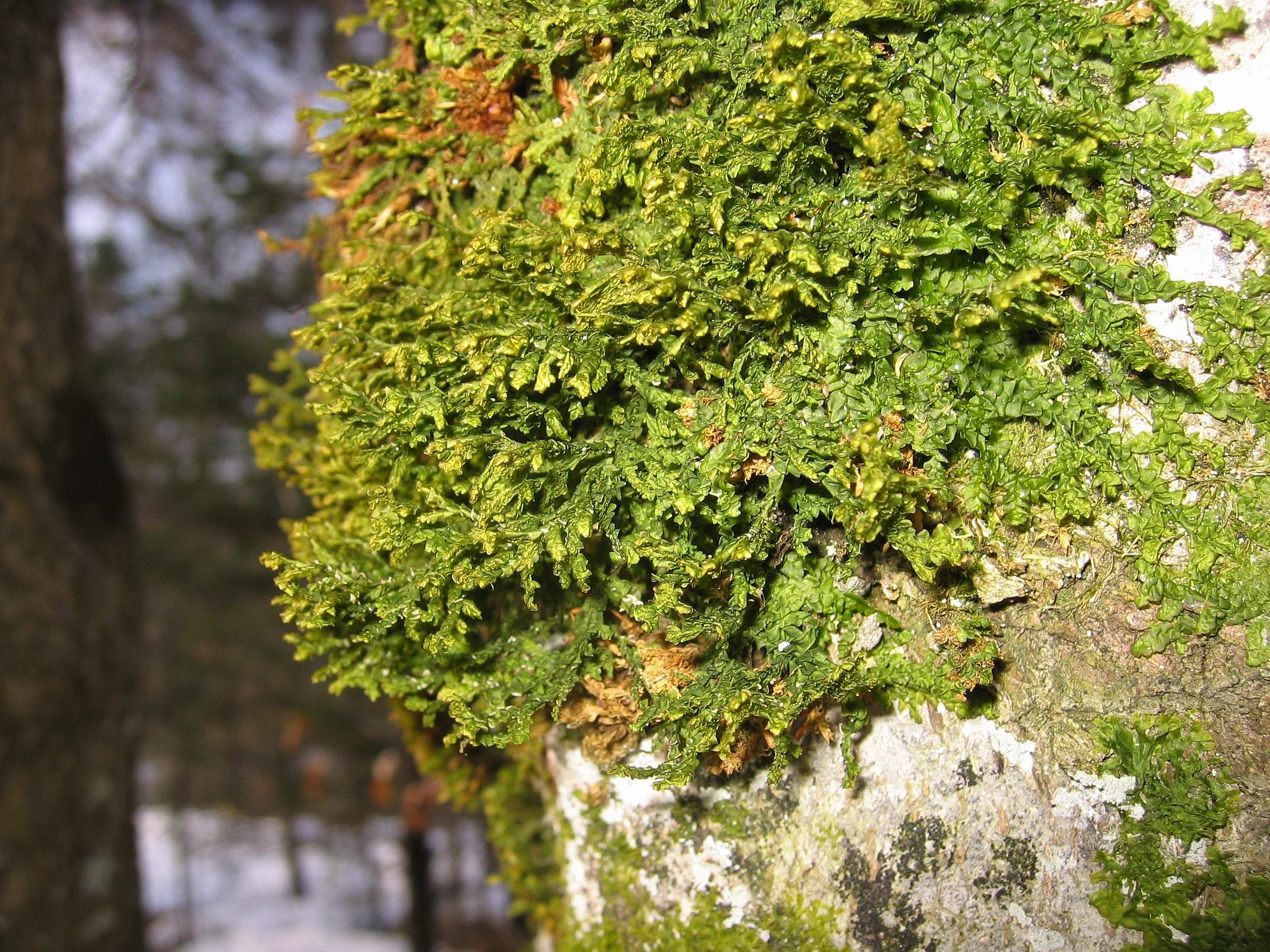
- Porella platyphylla (Porellaceae).

Scientific classification
- Kingdom: Plantae
- Division: Marchantiophyta
- Class: Jungermanniopsida
- Subclass: Jungermanniidae
- Order: Porellales; Schljakov 1972

Families
- Porellaceae Cavers 1910 nom. cons.; Goebeliellaceae Verdoorn 1932; Lepidolaenaceae Nakai 1943; Radulaceae Müller 1909; Frullaniaceae Lorch 1914; Jubulaceae von Klinggräff 1858; Lejeuneaceae Cavers 1910

= Porellales =

Order of liverworts

Porellales is an order of liverworts.

== Taxonomy ==
- Jubulineae Müller 1909
  - Frullaniaceae Lorch 1914
    - Frullania Raddi 1818a [Amphijubula Schuster 1970a; Schusterella Hattori, Sharp & Mizutani 1972; Steerea Hattori & Kamimura 1971; Mylia Leman 1825 non Gray 1821]
  - Jubulaceae von Klinggräff 1858
    - Jubula Dumortier 1822 nom. cons. non Bates 1929 [Salviatus Gray 1821]
    - Neohattoria Kamimura 1962 [Hattoria Kamimura 1961 non Schuster 1961]
    - Nipponolejeunea Hattori 1944d
  - Lejeuneaceae Cavers 1910 [Metzgeriopsaceae]
    - Lejeuneoideae
      - Brachiolejeuneeae
        - Brachiolejeuneinae Gradstein
          - Acanthocoleus Schuster 1970b
          - Blepharolejeunea Arnell 1962b
          - Brachiolejeunea (Spruce 1884) Schiffner 1893b [Lejeunea (Brachiolejeunea) Spruce 1884]
          - Dicranolejeunea (Spruce 1884) Schiffner 1893b [Lejeunea (Dicranolejeunea) Spruce 1884; Dicrojeunea Kuntze 1903]
          - Lindigianthus Kruijt & Gradstein 1985
          - Odontolejeunea (Spruce 1884) Schiffner 1893b [Lejeunea (Odontolejeunea) Spruce 1884; Dentijeunea Kuntze 1903]
        - Stictolejeuneinae Gradstein
          - Neurolejeunea (Spruce 1884) Schiffner 1893b [Lejeunea (Neurolejeunea) Spruce 1884]
          - Stictolejeunea (Spruce 1884) Schiffner 1893b [Lejeunea (Stictolejeunea) Spruce 1884; Leptostictolejeunea (Schuster 1984) Schuster 1990]
      - Lejeuneeae
        - Dactylophorella Schuster 1980
        - Metalejeunea Grolle 1995
        - Pictolejeunea Grolle 1977
        - Ceratolejeuneinae Gradstein
          - Ceratolejeunea (Spruce 1884) Jack & Stephani 1892 [Lejeunea (Ceratolejeunea) Spruce 1884; Cornijeunea Kuntze 1903]
          - Luteolejeunea Piippo 1986
          - Otigoniolejeunea (Spruce 1884) Schiffner 1893b [Lejeunea (Otigoniolejeunea) Spruce 1884; Ectojeunea Kuntze 1903; Physantholejeunea Schuster 1978]
        - Cheilolejeuneinae Gradstein
          - Aureolejeunea R.M.Schust.
          - Cheilolejeunea (Spruce 1884) Stephani 1890c [Lejeunea (Cheilolejeunea) Spruce 1884; Aureolejeunea Schuster 1978; Omphalanthus Lindenberg & Nees 1845; Omphalolejeunea (Spruce 1884) Lacouture 1908; Lejeunea (Omphalolejeunea) Spruce 1884; Peltolejeunea (Spruce 1884) Schiffner 1893; Lejeunea (Peltolejeunea) Spruce 1884; Osmojeunea Kuntze 1903; Strepsilejeunea (Spruce 1884) Schiffner 1893; Lejeunea (Strepsilejeunea) Spruce 1884; Anomalolejeunea (Spruce 1887) Schiffner 1893; Lejeunea (Anomalolejeunea) Spruce 1887; Notholejeunea Kuntze 1903; Leucolejeunea Evans 1907; Trachylejeunea (Spruce 1884) Schiffner 1893 nom. cons.; Potamolejeunea (Spruce 1884) Lacouture 1908]
          - Cyrtolejeunea Evans 1903c
          - Cystolejeunea Evans 1906a
          - Omphalanthus Lindenb. & Nees
        - Cololejeuneinae Gradstein
          - Aphanotropis Herzog 1952
          - Calatholejeunea Goebel 1928
          - Cololejeunea (Spruce 1884) Stephani 1891a [Lejeunea (Cololejeunea) Spruce 1884; Aphanolejeunea Evansand 1911; Metzgeriopsis Goebel 1888; Boninoleptocolea Horikawa 1936; Jovetastella Tixier 1974; Taeniolejeunea Zwickel 1933; Leptocolea (Spruce 1884) Evans 1911; Pedinolejeunea (Benedix ex Mizutani 1961) Chen & Wu 1964; Cololejeunea (Physocolea) Spruce 1884; Physocolea (Spruce 1884) Stephani 1916; Chondriolejeunea (Benedix 1953) Kis & Pócs]
          - Colura (Dumortier 1831) Dumortier 1835 [Lejeunea section Colura Du¬mortier 1831; Myriocolea Spruce 1884; Colurolejeunea Schiffner 1893; Lejeunea (Colurolejeunea) Spruce 1884; Mitrojeunea Kuntze 1903]
          - Diplasiolejeunea (Spruce 1884) Schiffner 1893 [Lejeunea (Diplasiolejeunea) Spruce 1884; Dijeunea Kuntze 1903]
          - Haplolejeunea Grolle 1975
          - Macrocolura Schuster 1994
          - Myriocoleopsis Schiffner 1944
          - Nephelolejeunea Grolle 1973 [Austrolejeunea (Schuster 1963) Schuster 1963; Siphonolejeunea (Austrolejeunea) Schuster 1963]
          - Schusterolejeunea Grolle 1980 [Cladocolea Schuster 1963a non Van Tieghem 1895]
          - Siphonolejeunea Herzog 1942
          - Tuyamaella Hattori 1951
        - Cyclolejeuneinae Gradstein
          - Bromeliophila Schuster 1994
          - Cyclolejeunea Evans 1904
          - Prionolejeunea (Spruce 1884) Schiffner 1893 [Lejeunea (Prionolejeunea) Spruce 1884; Serrijeunea Kuntze 1903]
        - Drepanolejeuneinae Gradstein
          - Capillolejeunea Arnell 1965
          - Drepanolejeunea (Spruce 1884) Schiffner 1891 [Lejeunea (Drepanolejeunea) Spruce 1884; Rhaphidolejeunea Herzog 1943c; Falcijeunea Kuntze 1903]
          - Vitalianthus Schuster & Giancotti 1993
        - Echinolejeuneinae Gradstein
          - Anoplolejeunea (Spruce 1884) Schiffner 1893 [Lejeunea (Anoplolejeunea) Spruce 1884; Anolejeunea Kuntze 1903]
          - Echinolejeunea Schuster 1963
          - Kymatolejeunea Grolle 1984
        - Leiolejeuneinae Schäfer-Verwimp & Heinrichs
          - Leiolejeunea Evans 1908
        - Lejeuneinae Gradstein
          - Harpalejeunea (Spruce 1884) Schiffner 1893 [Lejeunea (Harpalejeunea) Spruce 1884]
          - Hattoriolejeunea Mizutani 1986
          - Lejeunea Libert 1820 nom. cons. [Amblyolejeunea Jovet Ast 1949; Amphilejeunea Schuster 1978; Crossotolejeunea (Spruce 1884) Schiffner 1893; Lejeunea (Crossotolejeunea) Spruce 1884; Crossojeunea Post & Kuntze 1903; Cryptogynolejeunea Schuster; Dactylolejeunea Schuster 1971; Dicladolejeunea Schuster; Echinocolea Schuster 1963; Macrolejeunea (Spruce 1884) Schiffner 1893; Lejeunea (Macrolejeunea) Spruce 1884; Neopotamolejeunea Reiner; Eulejeunea Schiffner 1893; Hygrolejeunea (Spruce 1884) Schiffner 1893; Lejeunea (Hygrolejeunea) Spruce 1884; Taxilejeunea (Spruce 1884) Schiffner 1893 ; Stylolejeunea Sim 1926; Byssolejeunea Herzog 1941; Heterolejeunea Schiffner 1941; Cladolejeunea Zwickel 1933; Sphaerolejeunea Herzog 1938; Nesolejeunea Herzog 1947]
          - Microlejeunea (Spruce 1884) Stephani 1888a [Lejeunea (Microlejeunea) Spruce 1884]
          - Taxilejeunea (Spruce 1884) Stephani 1889c nom. cons. [Lejeunea (Taxilejeunea) Spruce 1884;Evansiolejeunea Vanden Berghen 1949; Schusteria Kachroo 1957]
        - Lepidolejeuneinae Gradstein
          - Lepidolejeunea Schuster 1963
          - Otolejeunea Grolle & Tixier 1980
          - Rectolejeunea Evans 1906
        - Leptolejeuneinae Heinrichs & Schäfer-Verwimp
          - Leptolejeunea (Spruce 1884) Stephani 1891c [Lejeunea (Leptolejeunea) Spruce 1884]
        - Pycnolejeuneinae Heinrichs & Schäfer-Verwimp
          - Pycnolejeunea (Spruce 1884) Schiffner 1893 [Lejeunea (Pycnolejeunea) Spruce 1884]
        - Xylolejeuneinae Henrichs & Schäfer-Verwimp
          - Xylolejeunea He & Grolle 2001
      - Symbiezidieae Gradstein
        - Symbiezidium Trevisan 1877
    - Ptychanthoideae Mizut.
      - Acrolejeunea (Spruce 1884) Schiffner 1893 nom. cons. [Lejeunea (Acrolejeunea) Spruce 1884; Acrolejeunea Stephani 1890 suppressed name; Trocholejeunea Schiffner 1932]
      - Archilejeunea (Spruce 1884) Schiffner 1893 [Lejeunea (Archilejeunea) Spruce 1884]
      - Bryopteris (Nees 1838b) Lindenberg 1845a [Frullania (Bryopteris) Nees 1838b; Bryolejeunea (Spruce1884) Lacouture 1908; Lejeunea (Bryolejeunea) Spruce1884]
      - Caudalejeunea (Stephani 1890) Schiffner 1893 [Lejeunea (Caudalejeunea) Stephani 1890]
      - Cephalantholejeunea Schuster 1980
      - Cephalolejeunea Mizutani 1979
      - Frullanoides Raddi 1822 [Ptychocoleus Trevisan 1877]
      - Fulfordianthus Gradstein 1992a
      - Lopholejeunea (Spruce 1884) Stephani 1890c nom. cons. [Lejeunea (Lopholejeunea) Spruce 1884; Lopholejeunea Stephani 1890 suppressed name]
      - Marchesinia Gray 1821 nom. cons. [Homalolejeunea (Spruce 1884) Lacouture 1908; Lejeunea (Homalolejeunea) Spruce 1884; Phragmicoma Dumortier 1822]
      - Mastigolejeunea (Spruce 1884) Stephani 1891a [Lejeunea (Mastigolejeunea) Spruce 1884; Flagrijeunea Kuntze 1903]
      - Phaeolejeunea Mizutani 1968
      - Ptychanthus Nees 1838 [Ptycholejeunea (Spruce1884) Stephani 1895; Lejeunea (Ptycholejeunea) Spruce 1884]
      - Schiffneriolejeunea Verdoorn 1933a
      - Spruceanthus Verdoorn 1934
      - Thysananthus Lindenberg 1844 [Thysanolejeunea (Spruce 1884) Stephani 1896; Lejeunea (Thysanolejeunea) Spruce 1884]
      - Tuzibeanthus Hattori 1947
      - Verdoornianthus Gradstein 1977
- Porellineae Schuster 1963
  - Goebeliellaceae Verdoorn 1932
    - Goebeliella Stephani 1911
  - Lepidolaenaceae Nakai 1943 [Jubulopsaceae]
    - Gackstroemia Trevisan 1877
    - Lepidogyna Schuster 1980
    - Lepidolaena Dumortier 1835 [Jubulopsis Schuster 1970; Polyotus Gottsche 1845a nom. illeg. non Nuttall 1837]
  - Porellaceae Cavers 1910 nom. cons.
    - Ascidiota Massalongo 1898
    - Porella Linnaeus 1753 [Macvicaria Nicholson 1930 non Gibson & Bray 1982; Opeca Hill 1773; Antoiria Raddi 1818; Cavendishia Gray 1821 suppressed name non Lindley 1835 nom. cons.; Madotheca Dumortier 1822; Suaresia Leman 1827; Schulthesia Raddi 1822]
- Radulineae Schuster 1963
  - Radulaceae Müller 1909
    - Radula Dumortier 1822 nom. cons. [Martinellius Gray 1821; Candollea Raddi 1818 non Mirbel 1802; Stephanina Kuntze 1891; Patarola Trevisan 1877 non Leman 1825]
