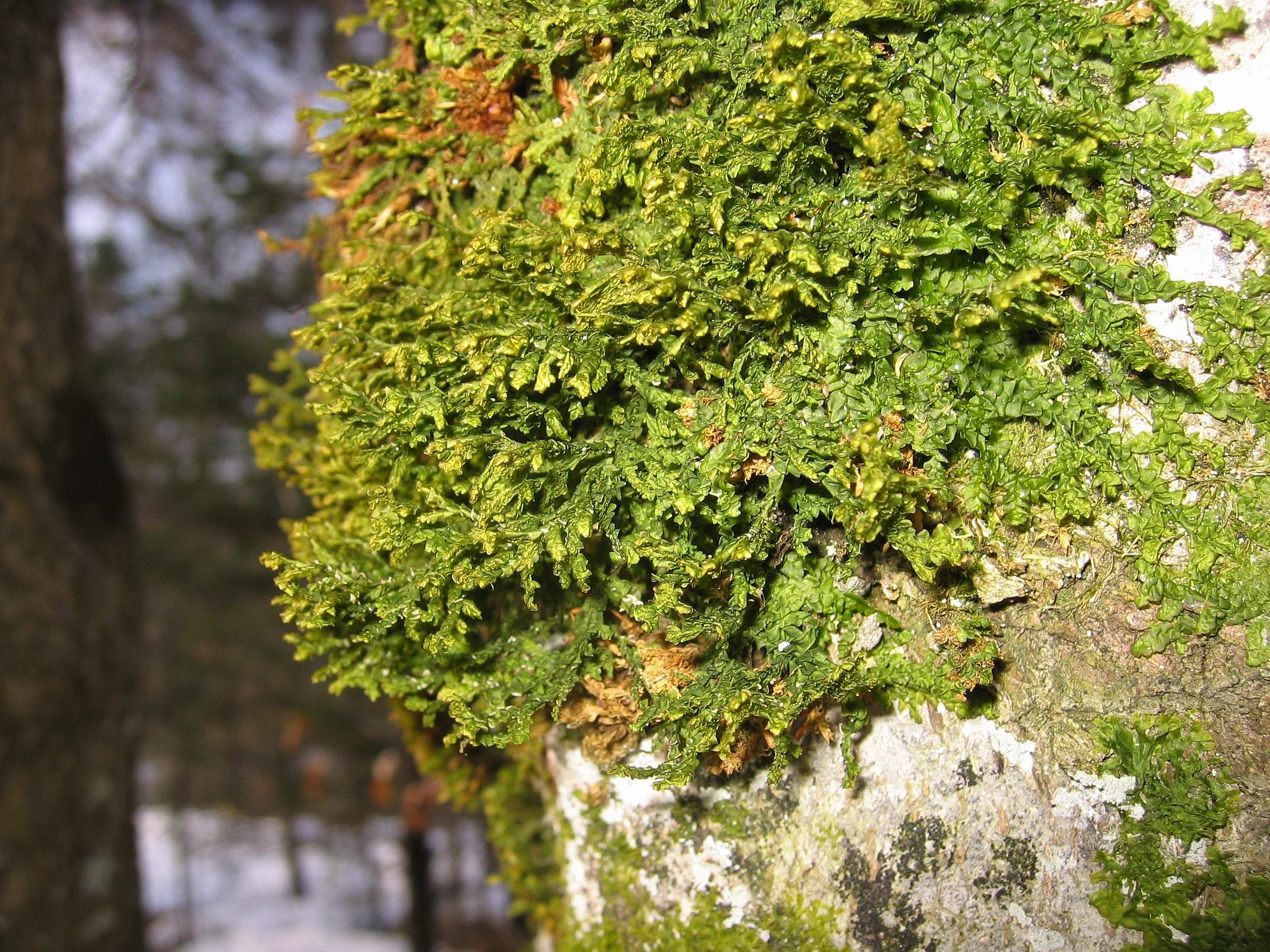

Conservation status
- Least Concern (IUCN 3.1) (Europe regional assessment)

- Secure (NatureServe)

Scientific classification
- Kingdom: Plantae
- Division: Marchantiophyta
- Class: Jungermanniopsida
- Order: Porellales
- Family: Porellaceae
- Genus: Porella
- Species: P. platyphylla

Binomial name
- Porella platyphylla (L.) Pfeiff.

Synonyms
- List: Jungermannia platyphylla L.; Antoiria vulgaris Raddi; Cavendishia platyphylla (L.) Gray; Lejeunea platyphylla (L.) Corda; Madotheca platyphylla (L.) Dumort.; Porella platyphylla var. major Lindb.; Bellincinia platyphylla (L.) Kuntze; Madotheca jackii Schiffn.; Porella jackii (Schiffn.) C.E.O.Jensen; Madotheca platyphylla f. convexifolia Papp; Madotheca platyphylla var. laxa Papp; Porella platyphylla var. subsquarrosa Arnell; Jungermannia platyphylla var. intermedia Grognot; Jungermannia platyphylla var. major Hook.; Antoiria vulgaris var. minor Raddi; Cavendishia platyphylla var. major Gray; Madotheca navicularis f. distans Nees; Madotheca platyphylla f. applanata Nees; Madotheca platyphylla f. attenuata Nees; Madotheca platyphylla f. communis Nees; Madotheca platyphylla f. convexula-attenuata Nees; Madotheca platyphylla f. depauperata Bernet; Madotheca platyphylla f. intermedia (Grognot) Roum.; Madotheca platyphylla f. major (Hook.) Nees; Madotheca platyphylla f. paradoxa Nees; Madotheca platyphylla var. porelloides Bernet; Madotheca platyphylla f. reptans Nees; Madotheca platyphylla f. squarrosa Nees; Madotheca platyphylla f. subsquarrosa (Arnell) Schiffn.; Madotheca platyphylla f. umbrosa Schiffn.; Jungermannia platyphylla var. major Wahlenb.; Madotheca platyphylla f. convexula Nees; Madotheca platyphylla f. applanata Nees; Madotheca navicularis var. distans (Nees) Debat; Madotheca platyphylla var. communis (Nees) Debat; Madotheca platyphylla var. major (Hook.) Dumort.; Madotheca platyphylla var. subsquarrosa Bernet; Madotheca platyphylla var. subsquarrosa Schiffn.; Porella platyphylla var. major (Hook.) Cooke; Porella platyphylla var. subsquarrosa (Schiffn.) Damsh.; Porella platyphylla var. major-convexula Pearson; Porella platyphylla var. vulgaris Lindb.; Cavendishia platyphylla var. platyphylla; Jungermannia platyphylla var. platyphylla; Madotheca platyphylla f. platyphylla; Madotheca platyphylla subsp. platyphylla; Madotheca platyphylla var. platyphylla; Porella platyphylla subsp. platyphylla

= Porella platyphylla =

Species of liverwort

Porella platyphylla is a species of liverwort belonging to the family Porellaceae. It has a Holarctic distribution, occurring across Eurasia and North America, where it typically grows on tree bark and rocks in areas with adequate rainfall. The species is most common in regions receiving at least 600 millimetres of annual precipitation. The species forms part of a complex taxonomic group that includes several closely related species and hybrids, with populations showing distinct genetic differences between continents despite their morphological similarity.

The species is characterised by its obtuse-rounded leaf lobes with flat margins, and irregular teeth at the perianth mouth when mature. It reproduces both sexually, with separate male and female plants, and asexually through leaf fragments. P. platyphylla is known for its ability to survive long periods of desiccation, being able to recover normal photosynthetic function within hours of rehydration. The species produces unique chemical compounds, including pinguisane sesquiterpenoids and sacculatane diterpenoids, which help distinguish it from related species. Recent molecular studies have revealed significant genetic variation within the species, particularly in European populations, though this variation is not always reflected in physical characteristics.

== Taxonomy ==
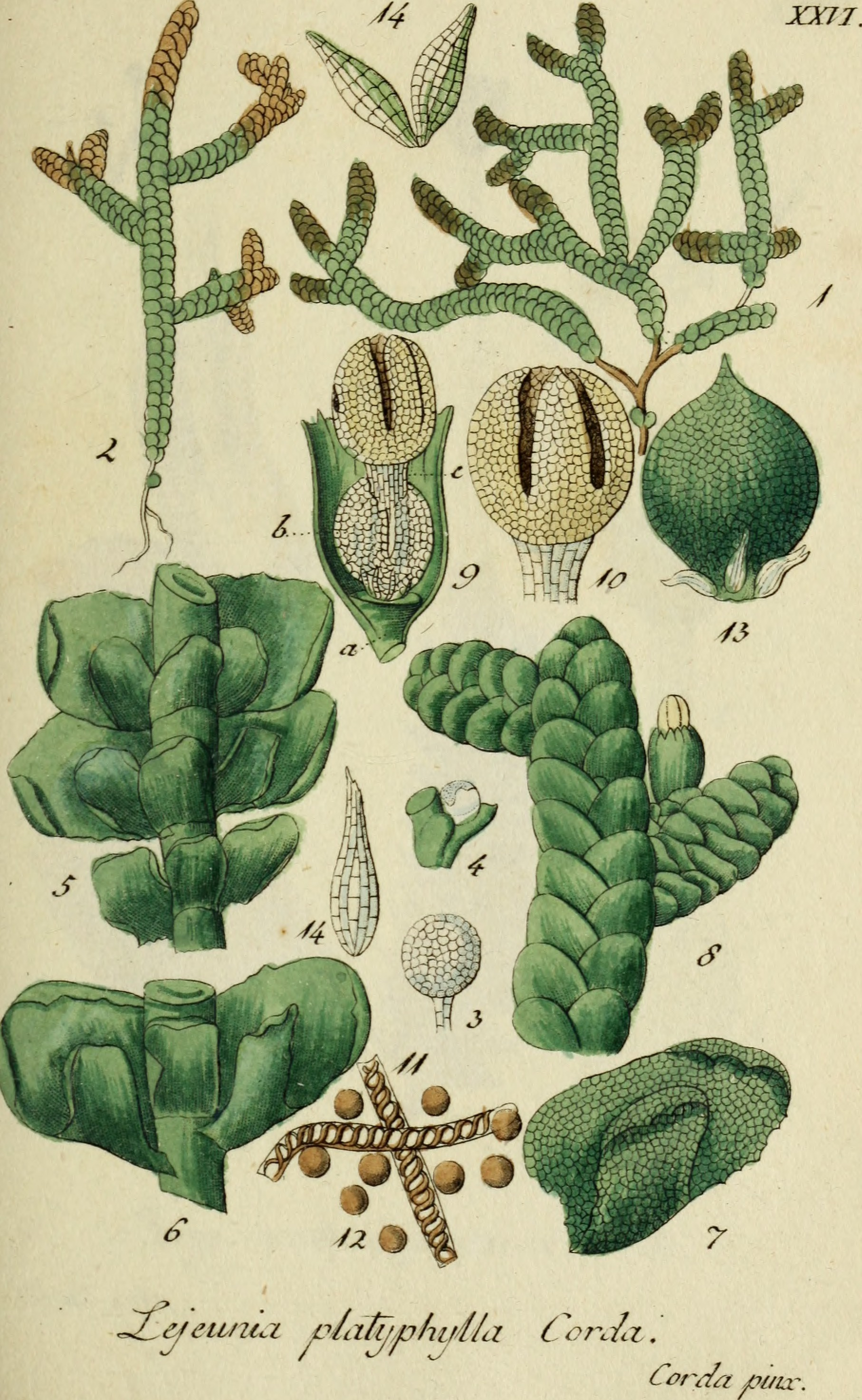
1798 illustration of "Lejeunea platyphylla" by Jacob Sturm

The species was first described by Carl Linnaeus, with early descriptions and illustrations provided by Pier Antonio Micheli (1729) and Johann Jacob Dillenius (1741). P. platyphylloidea was later described by Lewis David von Schweinitz in 1821 from a North Carolina collection, who distinguished it primarily by its occurrence on rocks rather than bark, larger plants with often tripinnate branching, quadrate leaves with inflexed margins, and differences in the relative sizes of the plant's structural features.

Historical taxonomic treatments varied in their interpretation of these plants. While some researchers like Marshall Avery Howe (1897) and Theodore Christian Frye and Lois Clark (1946) treated them as a single variable species, others such as Alexander William Evans (1916), Karl Müller of Freiburg (1915), and Rudolf Mathias Schuster (1980) maintained them as separate species. The perianth mouth structure and elater spiral patterns were particularly emphasised as diagnostic features by later authors.

A comprehensive 1998 study examining both morphological and genetic variation in Porella platyphylla and P. platyphylloidea led to a significant taxonomic revision. The research, which analysed 35 populations across North America and Europe, revealed three distinct genetic groups within what had previously been considered two separate species. To help stabilize the taxonomy of this complex group, researchers later designated a DNA voucher specimen from Germany (Heinrichs and Feldberg 4600) as an epitype for P. platyphylla.

=== Related species ===
Porella platyphylla forms part of a complex of closely related taxa, with its closest relative being P. cordaeana. DNA analyses have revealed two main clades within P. platyphylla: one predominantly North American and another widespread in Europe but also present in North America and Asia. Both species maintain distinct European and North American lineages that form sister groups in phylogenetic analyses.

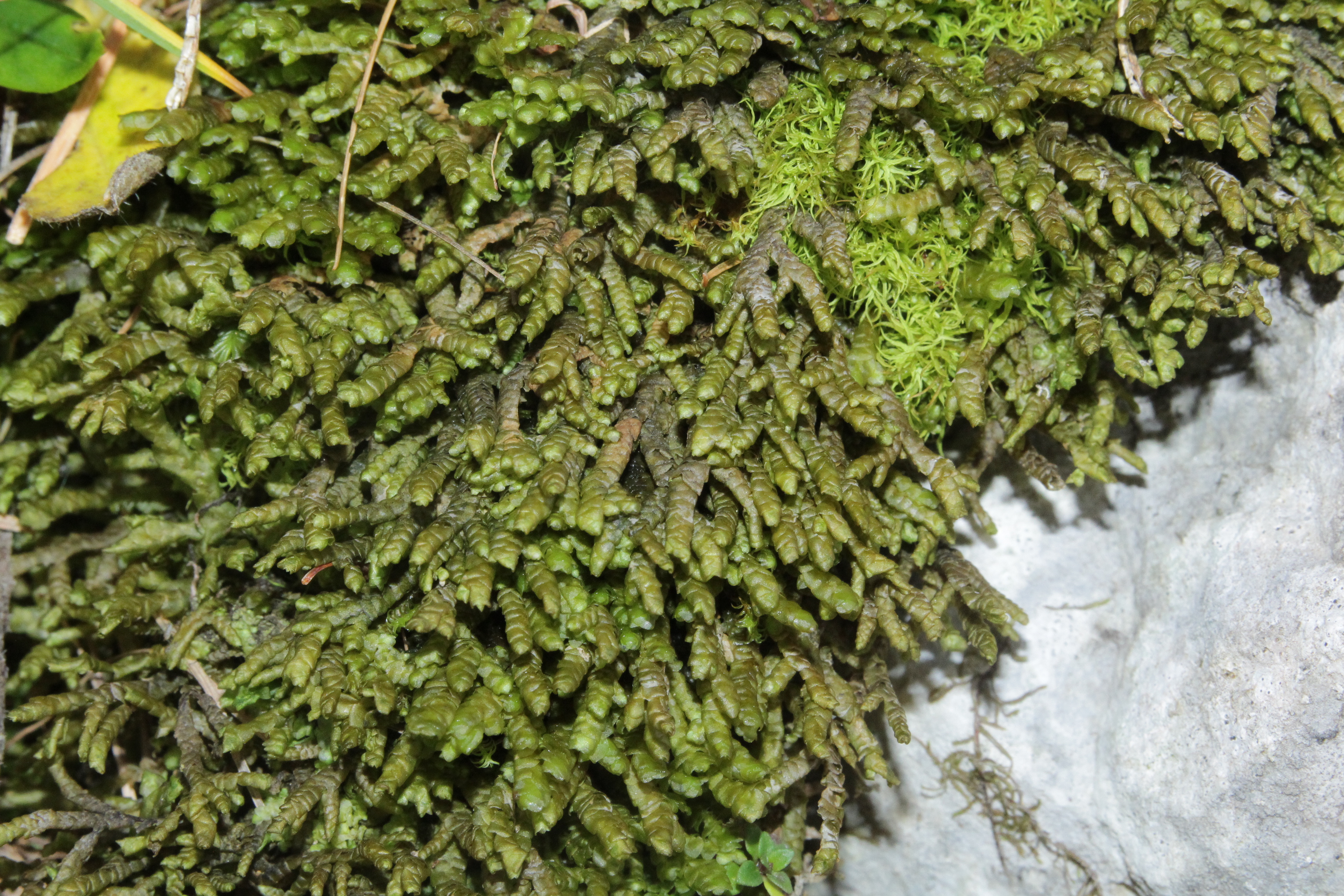
Porella cordaeana is a close relative of P. platyphylla.

Porella cordaeana can be distinguished from P. platyphylla by its crenulate-sinuous perianth mouth and acute, ventrally reflexed and twisted lobules. While both species have leaf lobules that fold under, in P. cordaeana these are twisted and taper to a point, whereas in P. platyphylla they are merely folded under without twisting and have rounded or obtuse tips.

These species can sometimes be found growing together in the same habitat, and multiple species may even grow intermixed within a single colony. This close physical association, combined with their ability to reproduce sexually, has led to hybridisation between species. A hybrid between these species, P. × baueri has been documented in Europe. This hybrid is an allopolyploid, meaning it originated through hybridisation between two species and underwent chromosome doubling. While P. platyphylla and P. cordaeana are typically haploid with eight chromosomes (occasionally nine in P. platyphylla), their hybrid derivative P. × baueri is polyploid. Genetic evidence suggests this hybridisation event was relatively recent, and the hybrid may have originated multiple times.

Analyses of chloroplast and nuclear DNA have produced conflicting evolutionary trees, suggesting that the North American populations formerly known as P. platyphylloidea may be the result of ancient hybridisation between P. cordaeana and P. platyphylla, though through a different and much older hybridisation event than that which produced P. × baueri.

== Description ==
Porella platyphylla shows several distinctive morphological features that help identify it, though these can show considerable variation both within single populations and between different geographical regions. The leaves have tips (known as lobes) that are obtuse-rounded in shape, with edges that lie flat rather than being wavy or folded. The cells in the middle portion of these lobes measure between 28.5 and 36.1 μm in width.

A key identifying feature of the species is found in its perianth—a protective tube-like structure that surrounds the developing reproductive organs in female plants. When fully mature, the mouth of this perianth has irregularly spaced teeth that are 2–6 cells wide at their base. The female reproductive structures (called bracts) typically have smooth, unbroken edges, unlike some related species which may have toothed or spiny margins.

Features previously used to distinguish P. platyphylla from P. platyphylloidea, such as leaf lobule width and elater spiral patterns, have shown no consistent correlation with genetic groupings. Even populations that were genetically identical sometimes displayed different morphological characteristics traditionally used to separate the species. More recent molecular studies have revealed the existence of cryptic species—genetically distinct lineages that cannot be reliably distinguished through morphological examination alone. While some tendencies exist, such as larger leaf lobules being more common in North American populations, these characteristics are not consistent enough for reliable identification. This challenge is further complicated by evidence that some populations may represent ancient hybrid lineages, explaining the high degree of morphological variability observed within populations and the unreliability of traditionally used diagnostic features.

Characteristic features of Porella platyphylla
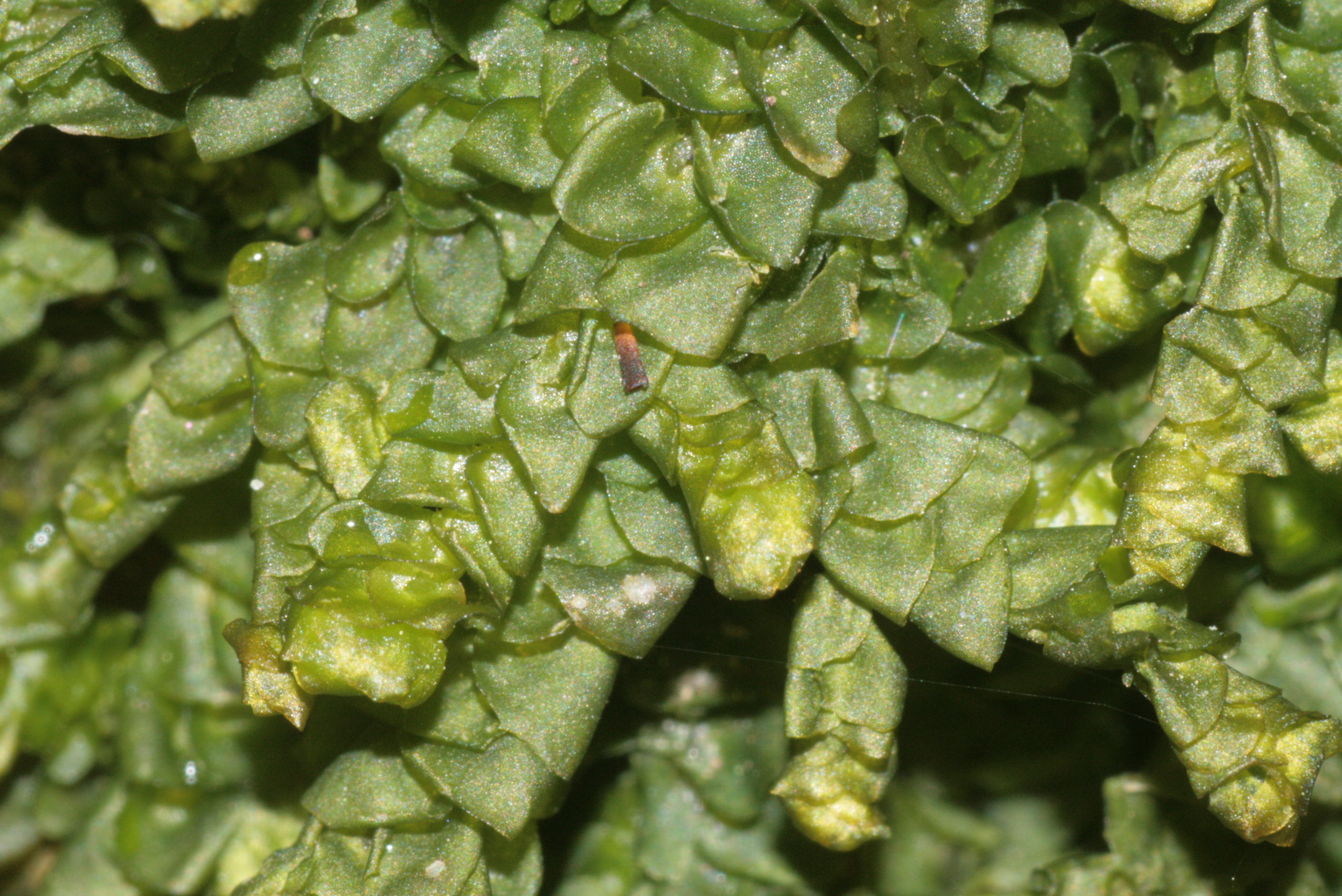
Close-up showing its characteristic overlapping leaves and folded lobules

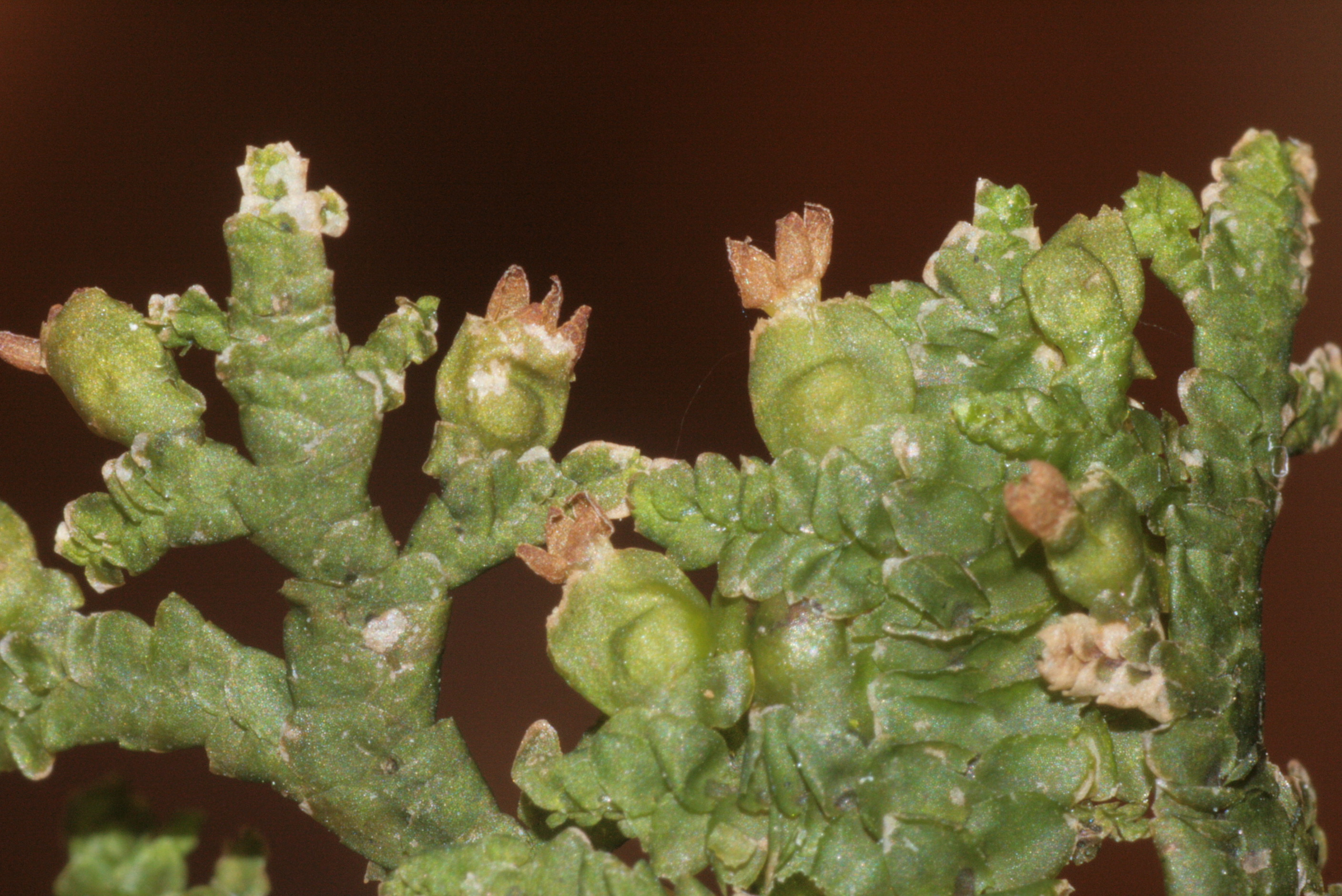
Showing perianths (protective structures) with mature sporophytes at their tips

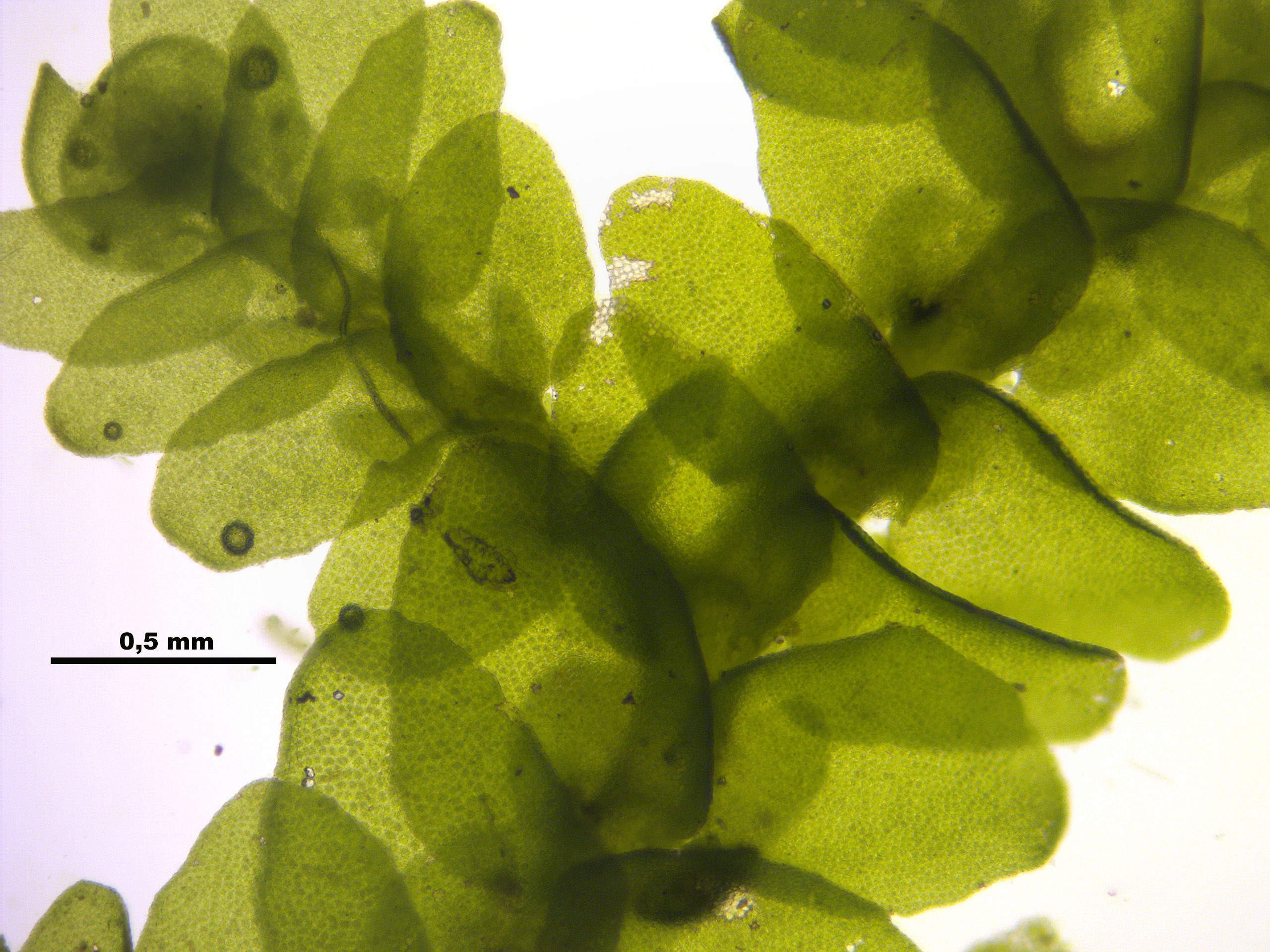
Light microscope view showing the transparent overlapping leaves with their cellular structure visible;
scale bar: 0.5 mm

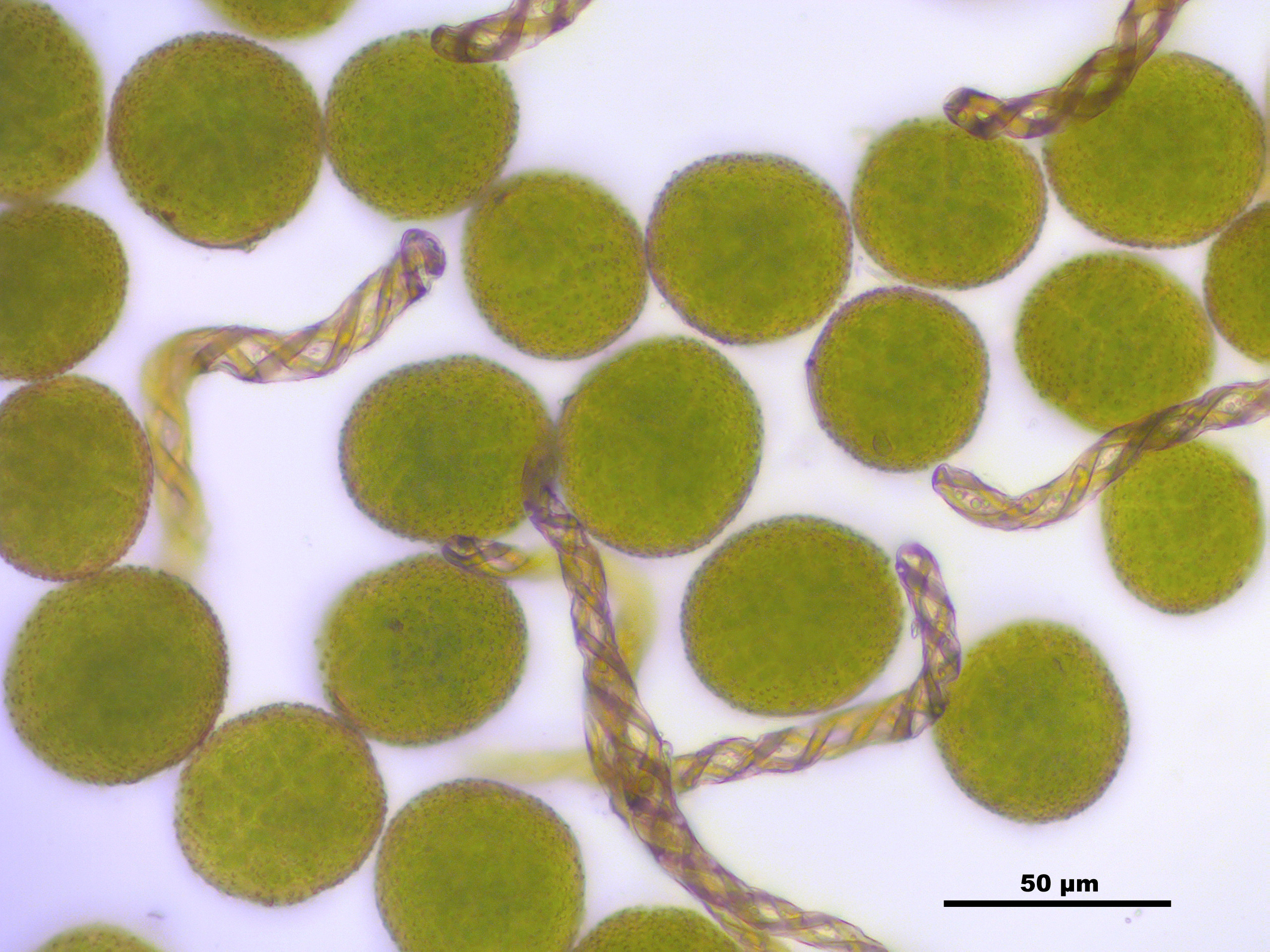
Microscopic view of spores and elaters (spiral-shaped structures that help disperse spores);
scale bar: 50 μm

== Life history ==
The life cycle and development of Porella platyphylla was first studied in detail in the early 20th century. Like other liverworts, this species displays distinct stages in its life cycle, including both a dominant gametophyte (the main plant body) and a smaller sporophyte phase.

=== Vegetative structure ===
The main plant body (gametophyte) grows flat against its substrate in a pattern known as dorsiventral (having distinct upper and lower surfaces). It develops from a pyramid-shaped growing tip called an apical cell, which continually divides to form new tissue. The plant produces three rows of leaves: two rows on the upper (dorsal) surface and one row on the lower (ventral) surface. The ventral leaves, technically called amphigastria, are supplemented by special flaps or lobes from the dorsal leaves that fold underneath, giving the appearance of five rows of leaves when viewed from below.

=== Reproduction ===
Porella platyphylla reproduces sexually, with male and female reproductive organs developing on short side branches. The female organs (archegonia) develop on particularly short branches and consist of a protective jacket of cells surrounding a central channel containing an egg cell. The male organs (antheridia) form on slightly longer branches and produce sperm cells. Each antheridium develops on a long, slender stalk made up of two rows of cells. Individual colonies are often multiclonal, with male and female plants growing intermixed, indicating establishment from multiple spores. While female plants are relatively common (about 49% of shoots), male plants are less frequently found (around 10% of shoots).

After fertilisation, the embryo develops into a sporophyte—the spore-producing generation. The mature sporophyte consists of a capsule containing spores mixed with elongated cells called elaters, which help disperse the spores. The sporophyte base forms a foot that anchors it to the parent plant, with the shape of this foot varying from club-like to anchor-shaped.

=== Survival adaptations ===
One main characteristic of P. platyphylla is its ability to survive long periods of drying out (desiccation). The plant can remain dormant in a dried state for months or even years, reviving quickly when moisture becomes available again. This adaptation allows it to survive in environments with irregular water availability.

Studies using chlorophyll fluorescence measurements have shown that the species can recover rapidly and completely after spending a week in an air-dry state. When rehydrated, the plant's photosynthetic apparatus returns to normal functioning within just two hours, regardless of whether recovery takes place in light or darkness. This rapid recovery suggests that P. platyphylla has "constitutive" protection mechanisms—meaning the protective systems are always present rather than being produced in response to drying.

During drying, the plant's photosynthetic efficiency remains near optimal until water content falls below about half of the fully hydrated state, after which it declines steeply. However, this decline is fully reversible, and the period of desiccation appears as only a temporary interruption of normal photosynthetic function. The plant shows increased photoprotection during recovery in light conditions, with these protective processes being essentially complete within 24 hours.

== Chemistry ==
Porella platyphylla produces a wide range of terpenoid metabolites, including mono-, sesqui-, di- and triterpenoids. The species belongs to the "nonpungent" chemotype of Porella species (referring to taste rather than smell), producing primarily pinguisane sesquiterpenoids and sacculatane diterpenoids – carbon skeletons that remain unique to liverworts. The species can be distinguished chemically from pungent Porella species, which produce intensely pungent drimane compounds and related substances. P. platyphylla belongs to the pinguisane-sacculatane chemotype, characterised by high amounts of pinguisane-type sesquiterpenoids alongside sacculatane-type diterpenoids. It is known for the presence of monoterpenoids, with α-terpinene as the most abundant component.

Chemical composition shows strong correlation with molecular phylogenetic data in the genus Porella. The chemical profile of P. platyphylla places it in a clade with P. navicularis, both sharing the pinguisane-sacculatane chemotype. The absence of pungent drimane compounds distinguishes this clade from the P. vernicosa complex, which forms a distinct section within the genus characterised by pungent taste and glossy appearance. The chemical composition of Porella species, particularly their terpenoid profiles, has proven valuable for taxonomic investigations, helping to resolve uncertainties in this morphologically challenging genus through correlation with molecular data.

== Distribution and habitat ==
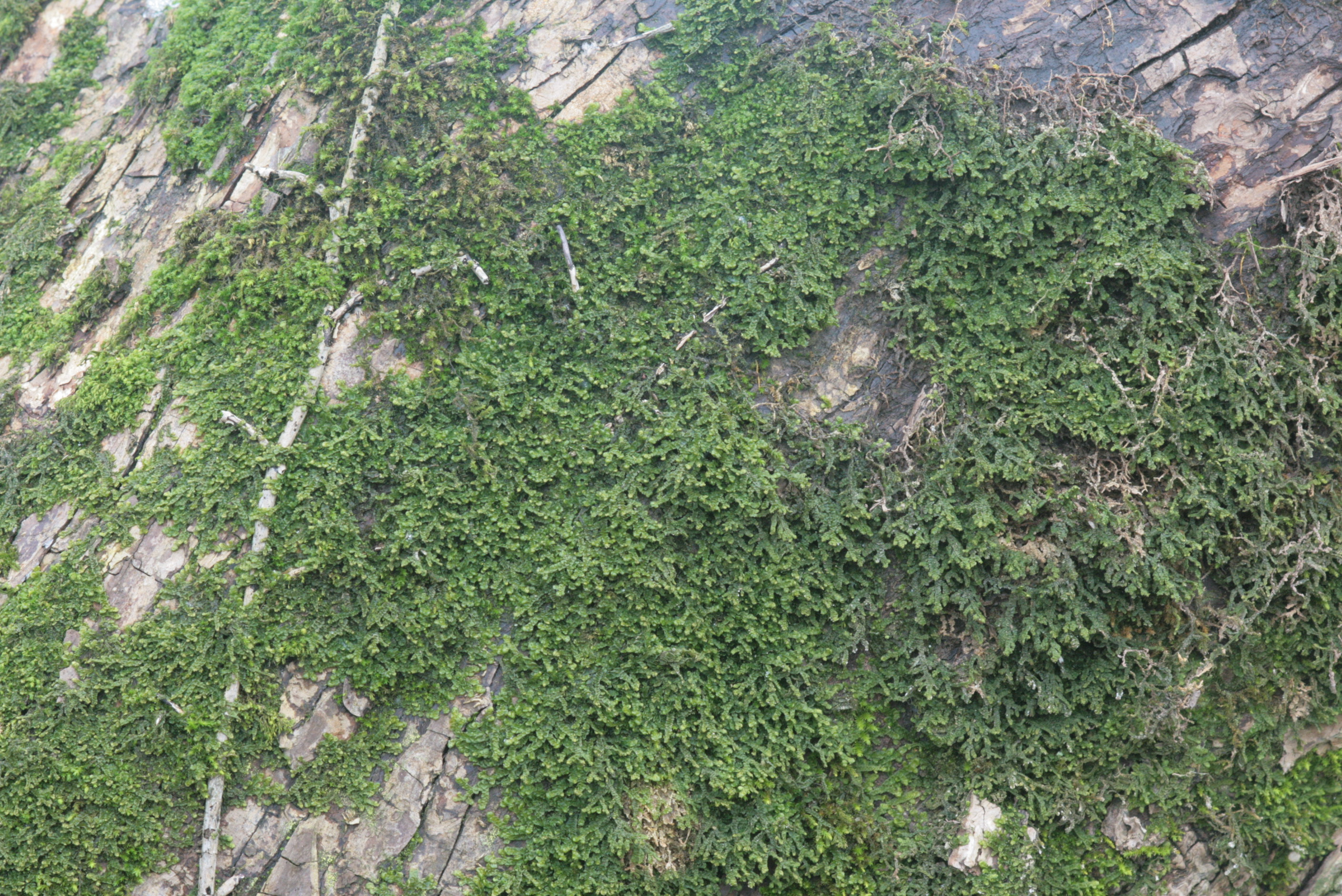
Porella platyphylla growing on rock face, showing its typical mat-forming growth habit

Porella platyphylla is widely distributed in forest ecosystems that receive at least 600 millimetres of annual precipitation. It is particularly abundant in northern and central Europe and along the Atlantic coast and islands, though it can also be found scattered throughout Mediterranean regions. The liverwort has a Holarctic distribution pattern, occurring across Eurasia and North America. The species shows distinct geographical structuring in its genetic makeup, with European and North American populations forming separate sister clades. While the species is capable of long-distance dispersal—as evidenced by its wide distribution—molecular evidence suggests that successful establishment and genetic mixing between distant populations remains relatively rare. Whilst the species is widespread in Europe, the typical European form (P. platyphylla sensu stricto) has been confirmed from only a single locality in New Mexico in North America.

The species typically grows on tree bark and rocks, though habitat preferences may vary between different genetic lineages. The North American populations formerly known as P. platyphylloidea were historically noted to occur more frequently on rock substrates, whilst European populations were more commonly found on bark, though this distinction has proven unreliable for taxonomic purposes. In the southern part of the Russian Far East, it primarily occurs on limestone and other basic rocks in partly shaded conditions. However, in northern regions such as the Commander Islands (around 55°N), it can be found on temporarily inundated stream beds, showing habitat preferences more similar to those seen in northern Europe.

Within Russia, most occurrences lie between 43° and 45°N, though the species penetrates northward to several locations including the Bolshoy Anyuy (49°N), Komsomolsk Nature Reserve (51°N), and the Dzhagdy Range (~54°N). Its presence in the Commander Islands (at almost 55°N) appears to be relictual, particularly notable as the species is absent from the intervening Kamchatka Peninsula.
