= Karl Ritter von Goebel =

German botanist (1855–1932)

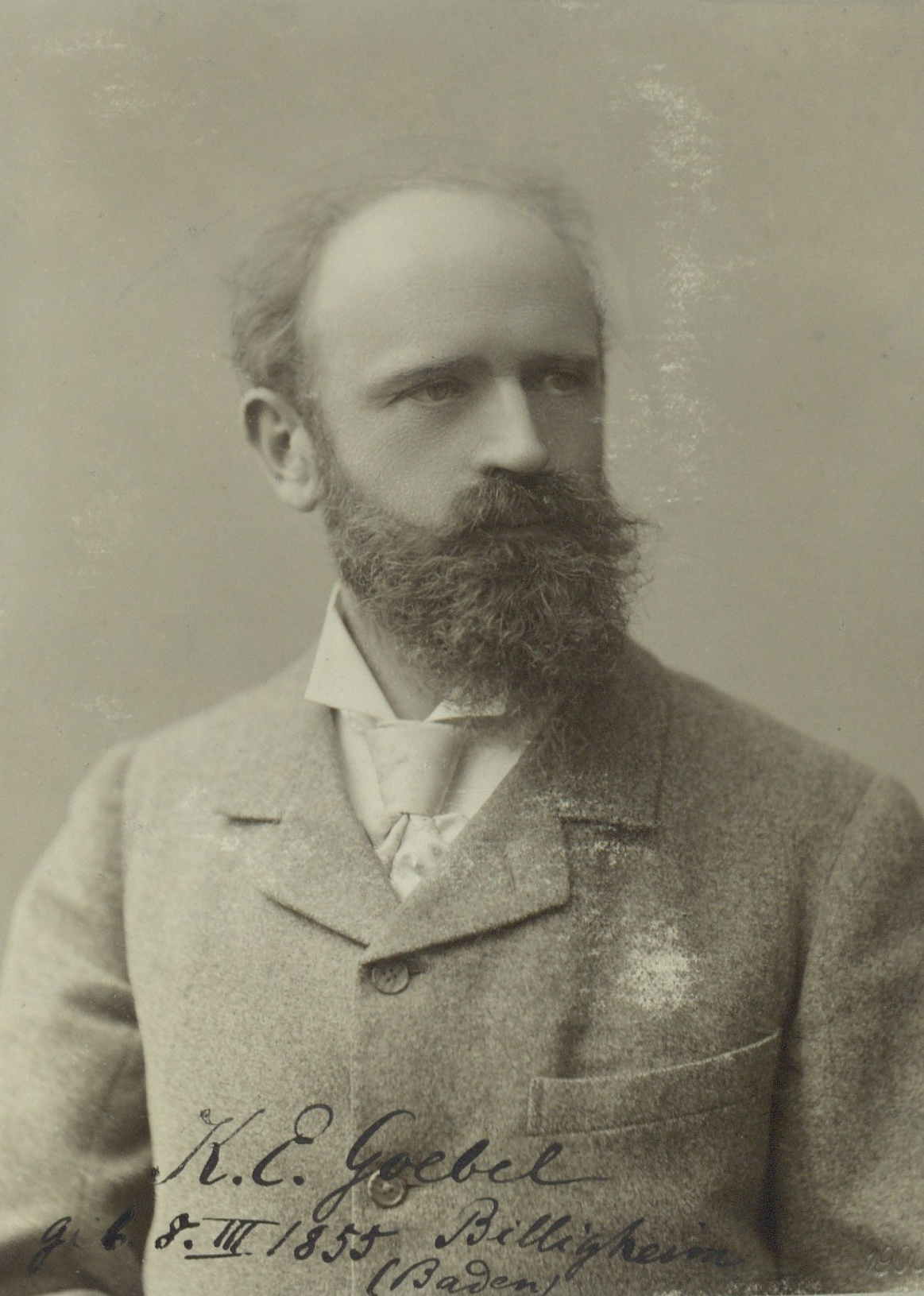
Karl Ritter von Goebel, c. 1898

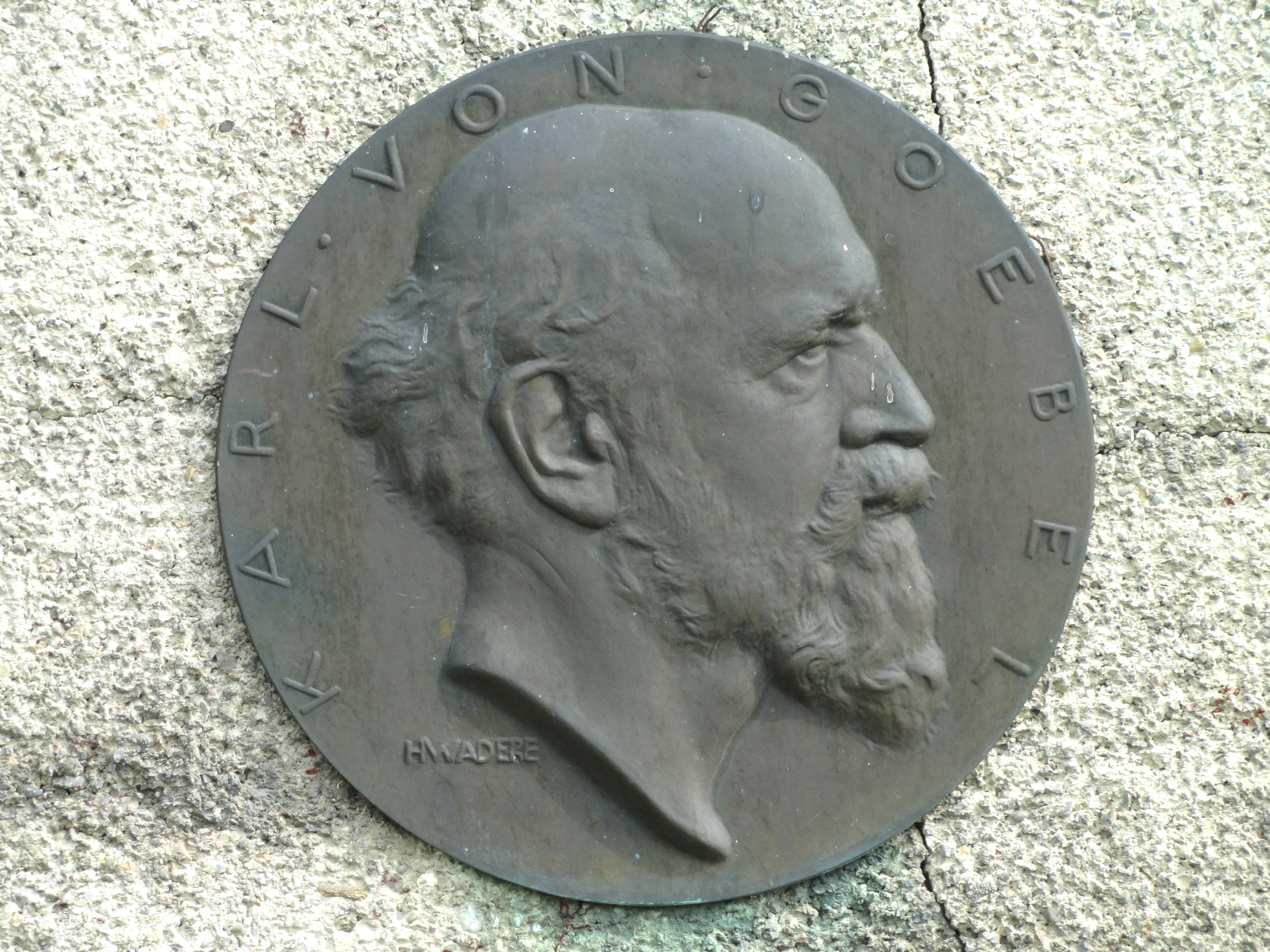
A commemorative coin dedicated to Karl Ritter von Goebel

Karl Immanuel Eberhard Ritter von Goebel (8 March 1855, Billigheim, Baden – 9 October 1932, Munich) was a German botanist. His main fields of study were comparative functional anatomy, morphology, and the developmental physiology of plants under the influence of both phylogenetic and extrinsic factors.

== Life ==
Starting in 1873, Goebel studied theology and philosophy, as well as botany with Wilhelm Hofmeister, at the University of Tübingen. In 1876, he moved to the University of Strasbourg, where he worked with Anton de Bary, and from which he graduated in 1877 with his Ph.D. In 1878, Goebel became assistant to Julius von Sachs, and in 1880 a lecturer at the University of Würzburg. In 1881, he became the first assistant to August Schenk of Leipzig University, then an associate professor at the University of Strasbourg, and in 1882 associate professor at the University of Rostock, where in 1884 he founded the botanical garden and a botanical institute. From 1887 to 1891, he was a professor at Marburg University, and from 1891 to 1931 at the Ludwig-Maximilians-Universität München, where he laid out the new Botanischer Garten München-Nymphenburg, and served as its first director. From 1885 to 1886, he undertook research trips to Ceylon and Java, from 1890 to 1891 to Venezuela and then British Guiana.

Goebel was editor of "Flora" from 1889 onwards. In 1892, he became a full member of the Bavarian Academy of Sciences (later serving as President). In 1910, he was elected an Honorary Fellow of the Royal Society of Edinburgh.

In 1911, botanist Franz Stephani published Goebeliellaceae, which is a family of liverworts belonging to the order Porellales. The family consists of only one genus: Goebeliella Steph., which was named in Goebel's honour. The liverwort genus Goebelobryum is also named after him.

In 1914, he was named a foreign member of the Accademia Nazionale dei Lincei in Rome, and in 1926 was elected to the Royal Society. In 1931, he was awarded the Linnean Medal of the Linnean Society of London.
