= George Burton Rigg =

American botanist and ecologist (1872–1961)

George Burton Rigg (February 9, 1872, Harrison County, Iowa – July 10, 1961) was an American botanist and ecologist, specializing in sphagnum bogs. In 1956 he received the Eminent Ecologist Award from the Ecological Society of America.

== Education and career ==
George B. Rigg grew up on a farm near Woodbine, Iowa and graduated with a bachelor's degree in 1896 from the University of Iowa. In 1907 he went to Washington state's Puget Sound area, where he became a high school teacher.

In 1909 he graduated with a master's degree in botany and became an instructor at the University of Washington, along with fellow botanists, John William Hotson and Theodore Christian Frye. There he spent his academic career and was chair of the department of botany from 1940 to 1942. He taught for thirteen summers at the University of Washington's Friday Harbor Laboratories and also did some summer teaching at the University of Iowa and the University of Chicago. At the University of Chicago, he received his Ph.D. in botany in 1914 and learned from Henry Chandler Cowles and the plant physiologist William Crocker (1876–1950). Rigg's ecological research dealt mostly with peat bogs and marine algae. In 1913 he went to the coast of southwestern Alaska to investigate the effects on kelp of the pumice and volcanic ash produced by the 1912 eruption of Mount Katmai.

His studies of Sphagnum bogs were concerned chiefly with peat stratigraphy, typology, vegetative composition of peat, and bog flora. Although most of his bog work was done in the Pacific Northwest, Rigg also made investigations in Alaska, British Columbia, Minnesota, Ohio, West Virginia and the New England States. He published some 50 papers in this field.

Rigg and the geoscientist Howard Ross Gould investigated Glacier Peak's volcanic ash deposits in peat bogs in Washington state and nearby areas.

Rigg's doctoral students include Henry Paul Hansen.

== Selected publications ==
=== Articles ===
- Rigg, George B. (1916). "A summary of bog theories". The Plant World. 19 (10): 310–325.
- Thompson, Thomas G.; Lorah, James R.; Rigg, George B. (1927). "The Acidity of the Waters of Some Puget Sound Bogs1". Journal of the American Chemical Society. 49 (12): 2981–2988. doi:10.1021/ja01411a002.
- Rigg, George B.; Harrar, E. S. (1931). "The Root Systems of Trees Growing in Sphagnum". American Journal of Botany. 18 (6): 391–397. doi:10.1002/j.1537-2197.1931.tb09598.x. JSTOR 2435874.
- Wirth, Henry E.; Rigg, George B. (1937). "The Acidity of the Juice of Desmarestia". American Journal of Botany. 24 (2): 68–70. doi:10.1002/j.1537-2197.1937.tb09067.x. JSTOR 2436721.
- Rigg, George B.; Richardson, Carl T. (1938). "Profiles of Some Sphagnum Bogs of the Pacific Coast of North America". Ecology. 19 (3): 408–434. Bibcode:1938Ecol...19..408R. doi:10.2307/1930595. JSTOR 1930595.
- Rigg, George B. (1940). "Comparisons of the Development of some Sphagnum Bogs of the Atlantic Coast, the Interior, and the Pacific Coast". American Journal of Botany. 27 (1): 1–14. doi:10.1002/j.1537-2197.1940.tb14207.x. JSTOR 2436744.
- Rigg, George B. (1940). "The development of sphagnum bogs in north America". The Botanical Review. 6 (12): 666–693. Bibcode:1940BotRv...6..666R. doi:10.1007/BF02879312. S2CID 35544956.

=== Books ===
- with Theodore Christian Frye: Elementary Flora of the Northwest. American Book Company. 1914.
- Decay and Soil Toxins. University of Chicago. 1916.
- The Pharmacists' Botany. New York: Macmillan. 1924.
- Peat Resources of Washington (PDF). Bulletin no. 44. Olympia, Washington: Washington State Division of Mines and Geology, Department of Conservation. 1958.
