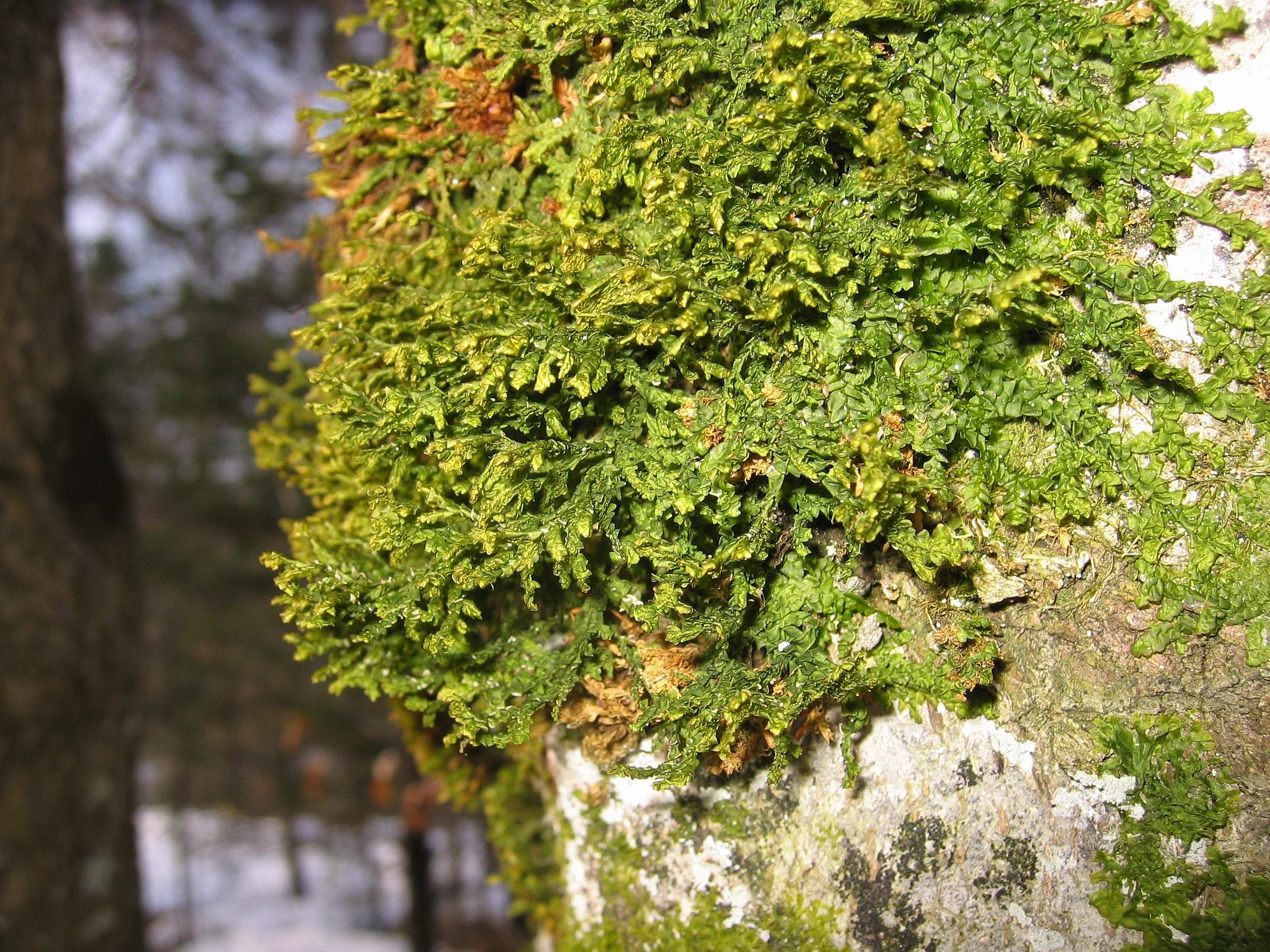
- Porella platyphylla

Scientific classification
- Kingdom: Plantae
- Division: Marchantiophyta
- Class: Jungermanniopsida
- Order: Porellales
- Family: Porellaceae
- Genus: Porella; L.

Species
- See text

Synonyms
- Macvicaria W.E. Nicholson; Madotheca Dum.; Schulthesia Raddi

= Porella =

Genus of liverworts

Porella is a large, common, and widespread genus of liverworts in order Porellales. It is a member of the family Porellaceae within that order.

There were 84 species recognized in 2016, most of them from East Asia. World Flora Online accepts 125 species, and GBIF accepts 150 species (as of 4 July 2023).

The genus has a wide cosmopolitan distribution in temperate areas, where it is commonly found growing attached to the bark of trees. Members of the genus have lobed leaves with a large upper lobe and small lower lobe.

Species Porella arboris-vitae, Porella bolanderi, Porella cordeana, Porella navicularis, Porella pinnata, Porella platyphylla and Porella roellii, were all found in Montana, USA.

== Species ==
The following species are recognised in the genus Porella by GBIF;

- Porella abyssinica (Nees) Trevis.
- Porella acanthota Spruce
- Porella acutifolia (Lehm. & Lindenb.) Trevis.
- Porella alpina (Lindenb. & Gottsche) Trevis.
- Porella amoena (Colenso ex Stephani) S.Hatt.
- Porella andica (Gottsche) Hässel
- Porella apiculata P.C.Chen & P.C.W
- Porella arborea Trevis.
- Porella arboris-vitae (With.) Grolle
- Porella assimilis (Hampe ex Gottsche, Lindenb. & Nees) Trevis.
- Porella baueri (Schiffn.) C.E.O.Jensen
- Porella biedermannii Frank Müll.
- Porella bolanderi (Austin) Pearson
- Porella borellii (Gola) Parihar
- Porella brachiata (Taylor) Spruce
- Porella brasiliensis (Raddi) Schiffn.
- Porella caespitans (Steph.) S.Hatt.
- Porella calcicola S.Hatt.
- Porella campylophylla (Lehm. & Lindenb.) Trevis.
- Porella canariensis (F.Weber) Underw.
- Porella capehornensis Swails
- Porella capehorniensis Swails
- Porella capensis (Gottsche) Mitt.
- Porella caucasica Steph.
- Porella chenii S.Hatt.
- Porella chilensis (Lehm. & Lindenb.) Trevis.
- Porella chinensis (Steph.) S.Hatt.
- Porella circinnata Lindb.
- Porella complanata (Stephani) Swails
- Porella conduplicata (Stephani) S.Hatt.
- Porella cordeana (Huebener) Moore
- Porella cranfordii Steph.
- Porella crispata (Hook.) Trevis.
- Porella cucullistipula Steph.
- Porella densifolia (Steph.) S.Hatt.
- Porella denticulata (Kashyap & R.S.Chopra) J.X.Luo
- Porella elegantula (Mont.) E.A.Hodgs.
- Porella fauriei (Stephani) S.Hatt.
- Porella faurieri (Steph.) S.Hatt.
- Porella fengii P.C.Chen & S.Hatt.
- Porella frullanioides (Stephani) J.X.Luo
- Porella fulfordiana Swails
- Porella geheebii (Steph.) S.Hatt.
- Porella globulus Schiller
- Porella gracillima Mitt.
- Porella grandifolia (Steph.) S.Hatt.
- Porella grandiloba Lindb.
- Porella grollei S.Hatt.
- Porella handelii S.Hatt.
- Porella hattorii Udar & Shaheen
- Porella heterophylla (Stephani) S.Hatt.
- Porella hirta (Stephani) S.Hatt.
- Porella hirtella (Stephani) S.Hatt.
- Porella hoeana S.Hatt.
- Porella hohnelliana Stephani
- Porella hsinganica C.Gao & C.W.Aur
- Porella imbricata Lour.
- Porella inaequalis (Gottsche) Perss.
- Porella integrifolia Stephani ex S.Hatt.
- Porella japonica (Sande Lac.) Mitt.
- Porella javanica (Gottsche) Inoue
- Porella lancifolia (Stephani) Grolle
- Porella latifolia J.S.Lou & Q.Li
- Porella leiboldii (Lehm.) Trevis.
- Porella liebmanniana (Lindenb. & Gottsche) Trevis.
- Porella lindbergiana (Gottsche) O.Yano
- Porella linguaefolia (Stephani) S.Hatt.
- Porella lobata Stephani
- Porella longifolia (Steph.) S.Hatt.
- Porella madagascariensis (Nees & Mont.) Trevis.
- Porella integrifolia Stephani ex S.Hatt.
- Porella japonica (Sande Lac.) Mitt.
- Porella javanica (Gottsche) Inoue
- Porella lancifolia (Stephani) Grolle
- Porella latifolia J.S.Lou & Q.Li
- Porella leiboldii (Lehm.) Trevis.
- Porella liebmanniana (Lindenb. & Gottsche) Trevis.
- Porella lindbergiana (Gottsche) O.Yano
- Porella linguaefolia (Stephani) S.Hatt.
- Porella lobata Stephani
- Porella longifolia (Steph.) S.Hatt.
- Porella madagascariensis (Nees & Mont.) Trevis.
- Porella matongae (Herzog) E.W.Jones
- Porella maxima (Steph.) M.L.So
- Porella maxonii (Herzog) Swails
- Porella mexicana (Hampe ex Gottsche, Lindenb. & Nees) Trevis.
- Porella montantii (Steph.) E.W.Jones
- Porella navicularis (Lehm. & Lindenb.) Pfeiff.
- Porella niitakensis (Horik.) S.Hatt.
- Porella nitens (Steph.) S.Hatt.
- Porella nitidula (C.Massal. ex Stephani) S.Hatt.
- Porella oblongifolia S.Hatt.
- Porella obtusata (Taylor) Trevis.
- Porella obtusiloba S.Hatt.
- Porella ovalis (Gottsche ex Stephani) S.Hatt. & G.C.Zhang
- Porella parvistipula (Stephani) S.Hatt.
- Porella perrottetiana (Mont.) Trevis.
- Porella peruviana (Nees) Trevis.
- Porella piligera Stephani ex Pocs
- Porella pinnata L.
- Porella planifolia J.S.Lou
- Porella platyphylla (L.) Pfeiff.
- Porella platyphylloidea (Schwein.) Lindb.
- Porella plicata J.S.Lou
- Porella plumosa (Mitt.) Parihar
- Porella polita Mitt.
- Porella prolixa (Gottsche) E.W.Jones
- Porella ptilopsis Spruce
- Porella pulcherrima Herzog & S.Hatt.
- Porella queenslandica (Stephani) S.Hatt.
- Porella ramentifissa (Steph. ex Herzog) Swails
- Porella recurviloba Y.Jia & Qiang He
- Porella reflexa (Lehm. & Lindenb.) Trevis.
- Porella renifolia (Steph.) Swails
- Porella revoluta (Lehm. & Lindenb.) Trevis.
- Porella rikuzana (Stephani) S.Hatt.
- Porella roellii Steph.
- Porella rotundifolia Schiffner
- Porella saccata M.L.So
- Porella setigera
- Porella sharpii Swails
- Porella shikokiana H.Hara
- Porella sichuanensis S.Hatt. & K.C.Chang
- Porella spinulosa (Steph.) S.Hatt.
- Porella squamulifera (Taylor) Trevis.
- Porella stephaniana (C.Massal.) S.Hatt.
- Porella subdentata (Mitt.) Steph.
- Porella subgrandiloba Grolle & M.L.So
- Porella subobtusa (Steph.) S.Hatt.
- Porella subparaphyllina J.S.Lou
- Porella subsquarrosa (Nees & Mont.) Trevis.
- Porella suginoi Inoue
- Porella swailsii Grolle
- Porella swartziana (F.Weber) Trevis.
- Porella tenera H.Hara
- Porella triquetra (Steph.) E.W.Jones
- Porella truncata J.S.Lou
- Porella ulophylla (Steph.) S.Hatt.
- Porella undatorevoluta J.S.Lou
- Porella urceolata S.Hatt.
- Porella urogea (C.Massal.) S.Hatt.
- Porella urophylla (C.Massal.) S.Hatt.
- Porella ussuriensis (Stephani) P.C.Chen
- Porella vallis-gratiae (Gottsche) E.W.Jones
- Porella variabilis (Kashyap & R.S.Chopra) Parihar
- Porella vernicosa Lindb.
- Porella viridissima (Mitt.) Grolle
- Porella wakawana Stephani
- Porella wataugensis (Sull.) Underw. ex M.Howe
- Porella zikanii Herzog
