= Massalongo =

Massalongo is an Italian surname. Notable people with the surname include:

- Abramo Bartolommeo Massalongo (1824–1860), Italian paleobotanist and lichenologist
- Caro Benigno Massalongo (1852–1928), Italian botanist; son of Abramo Bartolommeo Massalongo
