= Symbiezidium madagascariense =

Conservation status
- Endangered (IUCN 2.3)

Scientific classification
- Kingdom: Plantae
- Division: Marchantiophyta
- Class: Jungermanniopsida
- Order: Lejeuneales
- Family: Lejeuneaceae
- Genus: Symbiezidium
- Species: S. madagascariense

Binomial name
- Symbiezidium madagascariense Steph.

Synonyms
- Symbiezidium madagascariensis Steph.

Species of liverwort

Symbiezidium madagascariense is a species of liverwort in the family Lejeuneaceae native to Madagascar and Seychelles. It is considered an endangered species.

== Distribution and habitat ==
S. madagascariense is known only from the islands of Madagascar and Seychelles, where it grows on tree bark in lowland rainforest. A 2000 assessment for the IUCN Red List of Threatened Species noted less than five localities at which S. madagascariense was present.

== Description ==
S. madagascariense is a relatively small, brownish liverwort with ovate leaves each measuring up to 2.5 mm (0.098 in) wide. This species is monoicous.

== Conservation status ==
S. madagascariense is listed as endangered by the International Union for Conservation of Nature under criteria B1+2cd, based on its small area of occupancy, the limited number of locations at which it is present, and the threat of habitat decline.
