= Ascidiota =

Scientific classification
- Kingdom: Plantae
- Division: Marchantiophyta
- Class: Jungermanniopsida
- Order: Porellales
- Family: Porellaceae
- Genus: Ascidiota; C.Massal.
- Species: A. blepharophylla

Binomial name
- Ascidiota blepharophylla C.Massal.

Genus of plants

Ascidiota is a genus of liverworts belonging to the family Porellaceae. The genus is monotypic, with Ascidiota blepharophylla being the only representative species.

Ascidiota is found in Eastern Russia and Alaska.
