= Jubula =

Jubula may refer to:

- Jubula (plant), a genus of liverwort (Marchantiophyta).
- A monotypic bird genus containing only the maned owl (Jubula lettii)
- A Functional Testing Tool for Eclipse
