= Goebeliella =

Scientific classification
- Kingdom: Plantae
- Division: Marchantiophyta
- Class: Jungermanniopsida
- Order: Porellales
- Family: Goebeliellaceae; Verd.
- Genus: Goebeliella; Steph.

Genus of plants

Goebeliellaceae is a family of liverworts belonging to the order Porellales. The family consists of only one genus: Goebeliella Steph..

The genus name of Goebeliella is in honour of Karl von Goebel (1855–1932), who was a German botanist.

The genus was circumscribed by Franz Stephani in Hedwigia Vol.51 on page 61 in 1911.

The family name of Goebeliellaceae was published by Frans Verdoorn in Man. Bryol. 425 in 1932.

The genus in only found in New Zealand and the islands of New Caledonia.

== Species ==
The genus only has 3 species as accepted by GBIF:

- Goebeliella bicornuta (Steph.) Steph.
- Goebeliella cornigera (Mitt.) Steph.
- Goebeliella glauca M.A.M.Renner

World Flora Online only accepts Goebeliella bicornuta and Goebeliella cornigera.
