= Leptolejeunea =

Scientific classification
- Kingdom: Plantae
- Division: Marchantiophyta
- Class: Jungermanniopsida
- Subclass: Jungermanniidae
- Order: Lejeuneales
- Family: Lejeuneaceae; Heinrichs & Schäf-Verw.
- Genus: Leptolejeunea (Spruce) Steph.

Genus of liverworts

Leptolejeunea is a genus of liverwort in family Lejeuneaceae.

It has a cosmopolitan distribution mainly in the Southern Hemisphere.

The genus name of Leptolejeunea is derived from lepton from the Greek λεπτός (meaning "small") and also Lejeunea which is in honour of Alexandre Louis Simon Lejeune (1779–1858), who was a Belgian physician and botanist. Lejeunea was the original genus of this type of liverworts published in 1820.

== Species ==
World Flora Online lists up to 47 species. Although, 74 species are accepted by GBIF (as of July 2023):

- Leptolejeunea aberrantia Horik.
- Leptolejeunea amphiophthalma Zwickel
- Leptolejeunea anophthalma Zwickel
- Leptolejeunea apiculata (Horik.) S.Hatt.
- Leptolejeunea arunachalensis Sudipa Das & D.K.Singh
- Leptolejeunea astrodea Mitt.
- Leptolejeunea astroidea (Mitt.) Steph.
- Leptolejeunea australis Steph.
- Leptolejeunea balansae Steph.
- Leptolejeunea balanse Stephani
- Leptolejeunea borneensis Herzog
- Leptolejeunea brasiliensis Bischl.
- Leptolejeunea convexistipa Bischl.
- Leptolejeunea cubensis Stephani
- Leptolejeunea curvatifolia Steph.
- Leptolejeunea dapitana Steph.
- Leptolejeunea denticulata Steph.
- Leptolejeunea dentistipula Steph.
- Leptolejeunea diversilobulata Bischl.
- Leptolejeunea dolabriformis Pearson
- Leptolejeunea elliptica (Lehm. & Lindenb.) Schiffn.
- Leptolejeunea emarginata (Horik.) S.Hatt.
- Leptolejeunea epiphylla (Mitt.) Steph.
- Leptolejeunea exocellata (Spruce) A.Evans
- Leptolejeunea foliicola Steph.
- Leptolejeunea foraminulosa Stephani
- Leptolejeunea hainanensis P.C.Chen
- Leptolejeunea integristipula Steph.
- Leptolejeunea jamaicensis R.M.Schust.
- Leptolejeunea lancifolia Steph.
- Leptolejeunea latifolia Herzog
- Leptolejeunea latilobula L.Shu, R.L.Zhu & Pócs
- Leptolejeunea lepinii Steph.
- Leptolejeunea ligulata Herzog
- Leptolejeunea maculata (Mitt.) Schiffn.
- Leptolejeunea mascarena Stephani
- Leptolejeunea massartiana Schiffn. ex Herzog
- Leptolejeunea micronesica Inoue & H.A.Mill.
- Leptolejeunea minima Herzog
- Leptolejeunea mirikana M.Dey & D.K.Singh
- Leptolejeunea mizoramensis Sushil K.Singh
- Leptolejeunea moniliata Steph.
- Leptolejeunea obfuscata (Spruce) Steph.
- Leptolejeunea papuliflora Stephani
- Leptolejeunea perforata (Schiffner) Schiffner
- Leptolejeunea punctata Herzog
- Leptolejeunea quintasii Stephani
- Leptolejeunea radiata Stephani
- Leptolejeunea radicosa (Nees ex Mont.) Grolle
- Leptolejeunea renneri Herzog
- Leptolejeunea repanda (Schiffner) Stephani
- Leptolejeunea revoluta P.C.Chen
- Leptolejeunea rhombifolia Stephani
- Leptolejeunea rosulans Steph.
- Leptolejeunea schiffneri (Steph. ex Schiffn.) Steph.
- Leptolejeunea serratifolia Schiffn.
- Leptolejeunea serrulata Herzog
- Leptolejeunea spathulifolia Stephani
- Leptolejeunea spinistipula (Mizut.) Xiao L.He
- Leptolejeunea stenophylla (Lindenb. & Gottsche) Schiffner
- Leptolejeunea subacuta Steph. ex A.Evans
- Leptolejeunea subdentata Schiffn. ex Herzog
- Leptolejeunea subrotundifolia Herzog
- Leptolejeunea thomeensis (Stephani) Stephani
- Leptolejeunea tridentata Bischl.
- Leptolejeunea trigonostipa (Spruce) Steph.
- Leptolejeunea tripuncta (Mitt.) Steph.
- Leptolejeunea truncatiflora Stephani
- Leptolejeunea truncatifolia Steph.
- Leptolejeunea udarii M.Dey & D.K.Singh
- Leptolejeunea vitrea (Nees) Schiffn.
- Leptolejeunea yangii M.J.Lai
- Leptolejeunea yunnanensis (P.C.Chen) R.M.Schust.
