= Leptolejeunea tridentata =

Conservation status
- Endangered (IUCN 3.1)

Scientific classification
- Kingdom: Plantae
- Division: Marchantiophyta
- Class: Jungermanniopsida
- Order: Lejeuneales
- Family: Lejeuneaceae
- Genus: Leptolejeunea
- Species: L. tridentata

Binomial name
- Leptolejeunea tridentata Bischl.

Species of liverwort

Leptolejeunea tridentata is a species of liverworts in the family Lejeuneaceae. It is endemic to Colombia. Its natural habitat is subtropical or tropical moist lowland forests. It is threatened by habitat loss.
