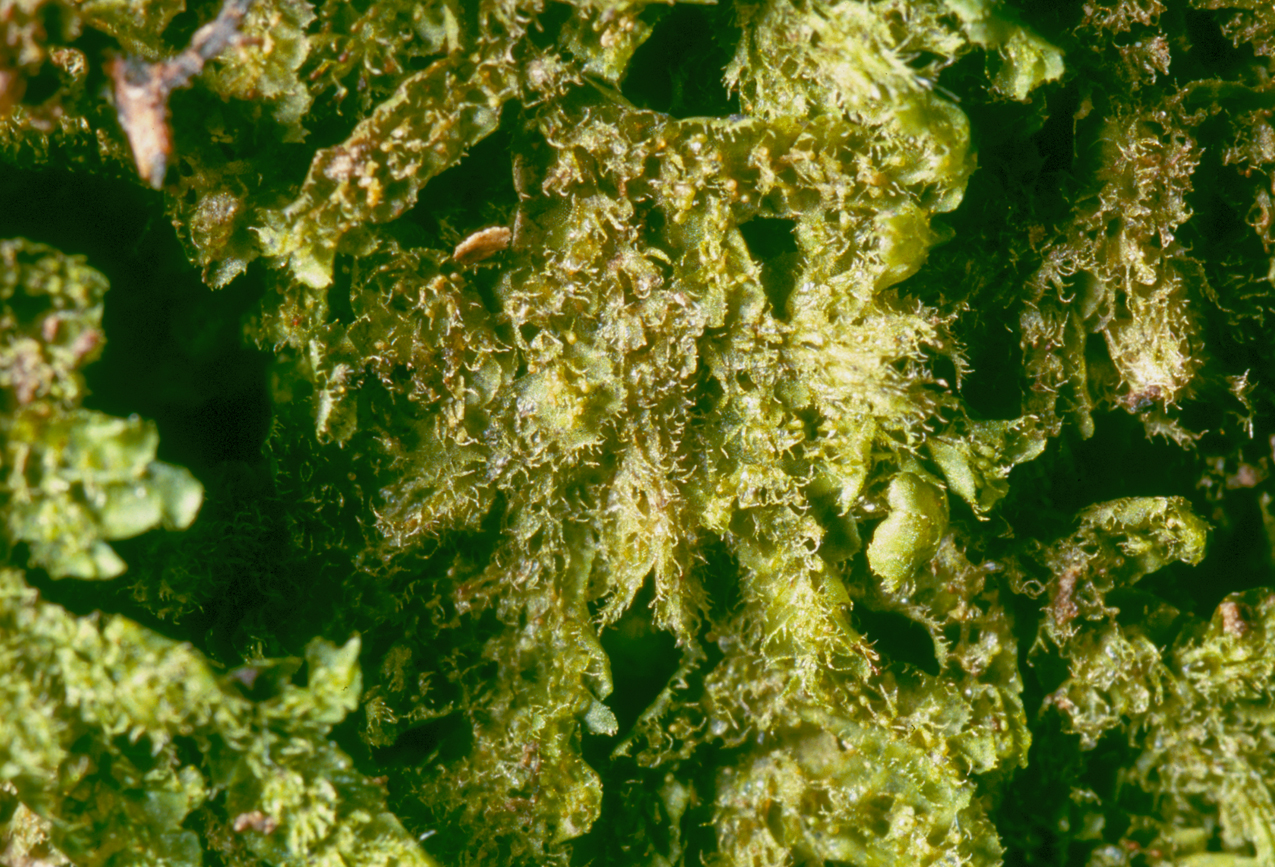
- Lepidolaena palpebrifolia

Scientific classification
- Kingdom: Plantae
- Division: Marchantiophyta
- Class: Jungermanniopsida
- Order: Porellales
- Family: Lepidolaenaceae; Nakai

Synonyms
- Jubulopsidaceae

= Lepidolaenaceae =

Family of liverworts

Lepidolaenaceae is a family of liverworts belonging to the order Porellales.

Genera:

- Gackstroemia Trevis.
- Lepidogyna R.M.Schust.
- Lepidolaena Dumort.
