= Caro Benigno Massalongo =

Italian hepaticologist (1852–1928)

Caro Benigno Massalongo (25 March 1852, Verona, Austrian Empire – 18 March 1928, Verona) was an Italian botanist who specialized in the field of liverworts. He was the son of paleontologist Abramo Bartolommeo Massalongo (1824-1860).

He studied botany at the University of Padua, receiving his PhD in 1873. In 1878 he was named professor of botany at the University of Ferrara. He was the author of 264 botanical publications. C. Massalongo issued the exsiccata Hepaticae Italiae Venetae exsiccatae. He was among the first to conduct systematic and scientific studies of plant galls.

== Eponymy ==
- Massalongiella, (family Nitschkiaceae), taxonomic authority Carlos Luigi Spegazzini (1889).
- Massalongina (Ascomycota), taxonomic authority František Bubák (1916).
- Massalongoa, (family Aytoniaceae), taxonomic authority Franz Stephani (1905).

== Selected works ==
- Le galle nella flora italica (Entomocecidii), 1893 – Plant galls of Italy (Entomocecidia).
- Nuova miscellanea teratologica, 1896 – New miscellaneous teratology.
- Le piante crittogame dell'agro Veronese : censimento, 1897 –
- Le specie italiane del genere Scapania, 1900 – Italian species of the genus Scapania.
- Contribuzione alla micologia Veronese. Memorie dell’Accad. d’Agricolt. Arti e Commercio di Verona Ser. 3 65: 153 pp. Contribution to Veronese mycology.
- Novità della flora micologica Veronese. Bull. Soc. Bot. Ital. 1900: 254-259. News involving Veronese mycological flora.
- Le Ricciaceae della flora italica, 1912 – Ricciaceae of Italy.
- Le Jubulaceae della flora Italica, 1912 – Jubulaceae of Italy.
- Le Lepidoziaceae della flora italica, 1913 – Lepidoziaceae of Italy.
- Le "Marchantiaceae" della Flora Europea, 1916 – Marchantiaceae of Europe.
