= John William Hotson =

Canadian-American botanist (1869–1957)

John William Hotson (May 2, 1869 – August 22, 1957) was a Canadian-American botanist and a professor of botany at University of Washington. He was a founder of the herbarium at the University of Washington and a pioneer of the systematic study of bulbiliferous anamorphic fungi. He was the first to make a comprehensive study of plant rust in the state of Washington.

== Early life ==
John William Hotson, the son of George Hotson and Elizabeth Jane Vincent, was born in Innerkip, Ontario, Canada. He and Sarah Jane Doak married in 1911 in Didsbury, Alberta. They had two children, Jean Hotson and Hugh Howison Hotson.

== Education ==
Hotson received undergraduate (1901) and master's degrees (1902) from McMaster University in Toronto, Ontario. In 1910, after a year of teaching botany at Pomona College, he quit his position with the intention to attend Harvard University for doctoral studies. At Pomona, he was described as "a fine scholar and an efficient teacher, and it was with regret that his resignation was accepted."

Prior to attending Harvard, Hotson attended, as a graduate student, the University of Chicago, 1902 (summer and fall), Cornell University, 1903 (winter), Teachers' College, Columbia University, 1903 (spring), and Clark University, 1903 (summer). After a period working as an instructor and school principal in Guelph, Ontario, Hotson continued his studies as a graduate student at the University of Chicago (1906–1907) and then at Harvard University (1910). He was awarded a doctorate in botany from Harvard in 1913.

While at Cornell, Hotson became ill, "inflicted with a fever." The medical expenses as a result of the fever were paid for by Andrew Carnegie.

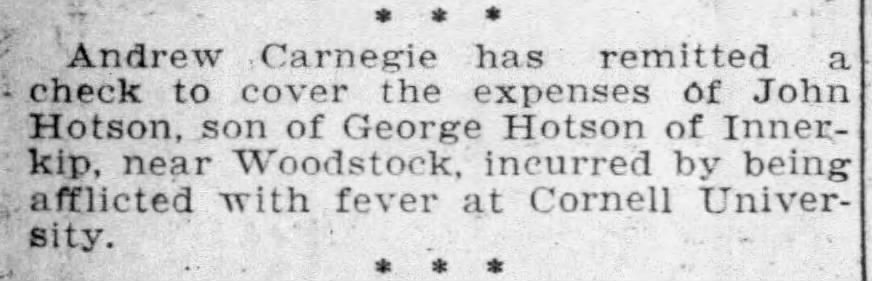
Andrew Carnegie has remitted a check...

== Teaching ==
During his time as a graduate student, Hotson had a number of teaching positions, including, lecturer in botany, Ontario Agricultural College, Guelph, Ontario (1903–1904), and as a Principal in the Macdonald Consolidated Schools, Guelph, Ontario (1904). Hotson was also an Austen Teaching Fellow in botany, Harvard University (1907–1908) and assistant professor of botany, Pomona College (1908–1910). As a graduate student at Harvard, Hotson was also an instructor (1910–11).

=== University of Washington ===
Hotson was hired in 1911 as an instructor in the newly founded Department of Botany at the University of Washington, where he was promoted to assistant professor of botany in 1914 and associate professor of botany in 1936. He continued to research and teach until his retirement as a full professor in 1947. After his retirement he was a research consultant in the department of botany. At his death in 1957, he was a Professor Emeritus of Botany at Washington.

During his tenure at the University of Washington, Hotson took on several roles. The Department of Botany became a separate entity within the university in 1900, and Hotson was one of the first three instructors when he joined in 1911; the other two being George Rigg and Theodore Christian Frye, the latter becoming Head of the Botany Department in 1903.

Hotson organized the "first fungus herbarium at Washington and many of his specimens are cited in treatments of Agaricus, Amanita, and other genera of agarics." Many of his samples created a basis for the Washington herbarium's collection, which is evidenced in both the herbarium collections at Washington as well as at the Harvard University Herbaria.

Hotson acted as supervisor of graduate students during his tenure, including University of Washington president, Dr. Henry Schmitz (1952–1958).

== Research ==
John William Hotson's research and publications were primarily on fungi, though, during World War I, Hotson researched the use of Sphagnum moss as a material for surgical dressings and a replacement for cotton dressings, Sphagnum as a surgical dressing, was published in Science in 1918.

Indigenous peoples in North America had been using Sphagnum moss for medicinal use as "salve for application on cuts."

Long recognized for its absorbency, Sphagnum moss has been employed as a diaper material, as a feminine hygiene product, and for bandages. J.D. Davis and Banack (2012) recorded that among the Kiluhikturmiut Inuinnait of Nunavut, Canada, Sphagnum was used for menstrual pads, diapers, and bandages. On Nunivak Island, Alaska, the Nunivaarmiut (Yup'ik) made diapers by placing dried Sphagnum in a scraped and softened seal skin. The Wet'suwest'en and Gitxsan peoples of British Columbia also made use of Sphagnum for diapers…

In fact,

Sphagnum has long been used for making absorbent bandages. For centuries, country people in the British Isles have used it in the treatment of boils and discharging wounds. It was at least recommended, during the Napoleonic and Franco-Prussian wars, for use by army surgeons. Sphagnum was first used surgically in a large way during the Russo-Japanese war when the Japanese utilized it extensively as a first-aid dressing.

What Hotson's research realized was that the value of sphagnum in surgery, which was

not fully appreciated until World War I, and by the end of the war the total British output of sphagnum dressings is estimated to have been about one million pounds per month. In the United States, 500,000 dressings were prepared after the American Red Cross approval of sphagnum in March, 1918, until the war's end in November. It is estimated that the use of sphagnum in place of cotton for dressings resulted in a saving, to the British, of not less than £200,000 per year. Perhaps equally important was the release of scarce cotton for use in explosives.

An account at the time of Sphagnum moss collection in Washington and Oregon states for the manufacture of bandages is given in the several newspapers. His work led, indirectly, to the development of the Sphagnum Products Company in 1922.

Other important work included examinations of diseased apple and cereal crops. In the summers of 1914 and 1915, he was employed to examine an outbreak of fire blight in the orchards in the Yakima Valley. This work led to several publications in the journal Phytopathology between 1915 and 1920, including, Collar-rot of apple trees in the Yakima Valley (1920). He was also hired by the US Government to survey cereal diseases in eastern Washington in 1915 as well as white pine blister rust in western Washington in 1922.

His study of rusts, Preliminary list of the Uredinales of Washington, published in 1925, was the "first comprehensive rust classification ever compiled for the state of Washington."

== Associations and honors ==
Hotson served on several professional associations, including as a director on the board of the American Phytopathological Society, Western Division (1936).

In 1962, faculty, alumni, and friends of Hotson, Rigg, and Frye established the Frye-Hotson-Rigg Award to honour the former professors of Botany at the University of Washington. The award is given to undergraduate Biology students "conducting research using a plant, algae, or fungi system for work in botany, ecology, evolution, taxonomy, environmental science, or biodiversity."

The Crassicarpon hotsonii cellobiose dehydrogenase is named in his honour.

== Death ==
John William Hotson died on August 22, 1957, at the age of 88.
