= Theodore Christian Frye =

American botanist (1869–1962)

Theodore Christian Frye (September 15, 1869 – April 5, 1962) was an American botany professor and one of the world's leading experts on bryology.

== Biography ==
Born on a farm near Washington, Illinois, Theodore C. Frye was the eldest of five boys in a family of ten children. He embarked on a teaching career even before he had completed his own high school degree.

== Education ==
By age 22, Frye had completed all the entrance requirements for his matriculation at the University of Illinois at Urbana–Champaign. There he graduated with a Bachelor of Science degree in 1894. From 1894 to 1896 he was a teacher and high school principal in Monticello, Illinois. From 1896 to 1897 he was a graduate student in botany at the University of Chicago. From 1897 to 1900 was superintendent of schools in Batavia, Illinois. From 1900 to 1902 he was a graduate student and an assistant in plant histology at the University of Chicago. There he graduated in 1902 with a Ph.D. in botany. His doctoral dissertation, supervised by John Merle Coulter, is entitled A Morphological Study of Certain Asclepiadaceae.

== Teaching ==
From 1902 to 1903 Frye was a professor of biology at Morningside College in Iowa. In 1903, he was appointed professor and head of the botany department at the University of Washington, Seattle, where, for his first five years, he was the only botanist on the faculty. His was joined in 1911 by John William Hotson and George Burton Rigg. The three would be the key faculty for the department for many years.

== Research ==
Frye became a prolific plant collector in the Pacific Northwest region. They collected plants together and she became an expert on alpine rock plants. Theodore C. Frye also collected plants with Robert Fiske Griggs and published, with George Burton Rigg, a flora of the Northwest in 1912. From 1914 to 1930 Frye was the director of the University of Washington's marine station at Friday Harbor (which was called "Puget Sound Biological Station" from about 1917/1918 until 1930 and "Puget Sound Marine Station" before the U.S.A. entered WW I). When he was the director he was also on the editorial board of The Puget Sound Marine Station Publications from 1915 to 1917 and The Puget Sound Biological Station Publications from 1918 to 1930.

Several species of kelp are edible seaweeds eaten in China, Korea, and Japan since prehistoric times. Frye and Charles Edward Magnusson experimented with a process of candying kelp bulbs for which they were granted a patent in July 1910. They 'came up with a product that looked and tasted like citron (which they called "Seatron") but the two scientists never carried the project beyond the patent stage.' In 1913, the U.S. Department of Agriculture appointed Frye and George Burton Rigg to make surveys of Alaskan kelp beds as an alternative source of potash. Frye's "bryophyte herbarium was one of the largest and best known collections in the American West." Together with Lois Clark he distributed the exsiccata-like series Hepaticae: Distributed by Clark & Frye.

== Marriage and family ==
In June 1908 in Seattle he married Else Marie Anthon. Frye and his wife spent the summers of 1939, 1940, and 1941 collecting in Mexico. They had several children.

== Awards and honors ==
- 1908–1909 — President of the Sullivant Moss Society (now called the American Bryological and Lichenological Society)
- 1909 — Fellow of the American Association for the Advancement of Science

In 1962, faculty, alumni, and friends of Hotson, Rigg, and Frye established the Frye-Hotson-Rigg Award to honour the former professors of Botany at the University of Washington. The award is given to undergraduate Biology students "conducting research using a plant, algae, or fungi system for work in botany, ecology, evolution, taxonomy, environmental science, or biodiversity."

== Eponyms ==
=== Genera ===
- Fryeella gardneri

=== Species ===
- Fauchea fryeana
- Internoretia fryeana
- Limbella fryei (synonym: Sciaromium fryei)

== Selected publications ==
- Frye, Theodore C. (1903). "The embryo sac of Casuarina stricta". Botanical Gazette. 36 (2): 101–113. doi:10.1086/328383. S2CID 83781749.
- Frye, Theodore C.; Blodgett, Eleanor B. (1905). "A contribution to the life history of Apocynum androsaemifolium". Botanical Gazette. 40 (1): 49–53. doi:10.1086/328645. S2CID 84908475.
- Frye, T. C. (1908). A Key to the Families of Washington Plants. University of Washington.
- Frye, T. C. (1910). "The Polytrichaceæ of Western North America". Proceedings of the Washington Academy of Sciences. 12: 271–328. JSTOR 24525378.
- Frye, T. C. (1910). "Height and dominance of the Douglas fir". Journal of Forestry. 8 (4): 465–470.
- Frye, Theodore C.; Jackson, Mabel McMurray (1914). The Ferns of Washington; reprinted from American Fern Journal, vols. 3 & 4, 1913 & 1914
- Frye, Theodore Christian; Rigg, George Burton (1914). Elementary Flora of the Northwest.
- Frye, T. C.; Rigg, G. B.; Crandall, W. C. (1915). "The Size of Kelps on the Pacific Coast of North America". Botanical Gazette. 60 (6): 473–482. doi:10.1086/331689. S2CID 83826118.
- Frye, T. C. (1928). "Observations on the Age of a Few Bryophytes". The Bryologist. 31 (2): 25–29. doi:10.1639/0007-2745(1928)31[25:OOTAOA]2.0.CO;2. JSTOR 3238820.
- Frye, Theodore C. (1934). Ferns of the Northwest. Metropolitan Press.
- Clark, Lois; Frye, T. C. (1936). "Some Hepaticae from California". The Bryologist. 39 (4): 91–94. doi:10.1639/0007-2745(1936)39[91:SHFC]2.0.CO;2. JSTOR 3239307.
- Clark, Lois; Frye, T. C. (1937). "Extension of Ranges among Northwestern Hepaticae". The Bryologist. 40 (1): 13–16. doi:10.1639/0007-2745(1937)40[13:EORANH]2.0.CO;2. JSTOR 3239066.
- Frye, Theodore C.; Clark, Lois. Hepaticae of North America. University of Washington publications in biology; v. 6, no. 1-5. Vol. 5 volumes, 1937–1947. University of Washington.
- Clark, Lois; Frye, T. C. (1942). "Some Hepaticae of Alaska". The Bryologist. 45 (3): 63–71. doi:10.1639/0007-2745(1942)45[63:SHOA]2.0.CO;2. JSTOR 3239570.
- Frye, T. C.; Clark, Lois (1946). "Attu Island Bryophytes Collected by Hardy". The Bryologist. 49 (2): 59–65. doi:10.1639/0007-2745(1946)49[59:AIBCBH]2.0.CO;2. JSTOR 3239693.
- Mullen, Doris; Frye, T. C. (1947). "Middle and South American Species of Oligotrichum". The Bryologist. 50 (1): 67–79. doi:10.2307/3239587. JSTOR 3239587.
- Clark, Lois; Frye, T. C. (1948). "Attu Island Hepaticae Collected by Howard". The Bryologist. 51 (4): 252–255. doi:10.1639/0007-2745(1948)51[252:AIHCBH]2.0.CO;2. JSTOR 3239169.
- Clark, Lois; Frye, T. C. (1949). "A Small Collection of Alaskan Hepaticae". The Bryologist. 52 (2): 58–61. doi:10.1639/0007-2745(1949)52[58:ASCOAH]2.0.CO;2. JSTOR 3239703.
