= Macdonald Consolidated School =

- Guelph, Ontario; Canada

Information
- Type: Public (model school)
- Patron saint: Sir William Macdonald
- Established: 1904

Macdonald Consolidated School was established in 1904 as a model school for Ontario through the sponsorship of Sir William Macdonald, a Montréal tobacco manufacturer and philanthropist. Macdonald was an advocate for the consolidated school movement, which involved closing small rural schools and amalgamating them into one large school. The school's first students travelled by horse-drawn van and benefited from qualified teachers and an expanded curriculum that included nature study, manual training and domestic science. The school also featured a chemistry laboratory, auditorium, indoor plumbing and individual garden plots for each student.

== History ==
At the turn of the century (1904), the major problems facing Canadian educators was the so-called "rural school problem".

More importantly, the population in country schools was declining as students were attracted by the opportunities and glamour offered by city life.

Curriculum in rural schools did little to encourage the future farmer since subjects were still based on the traditional combination of literature and the classics. At the same time, farmer's groups throughout North America were calling for equal opportunities for rural and urban children and a curriculum more scaled to the practical needs of farm life.

Various solutions were sought to upgrade rural education, such as adding agriculture to the curriculum, and establishing closer ties with colleges like the Ontario Agricultural College in Guelph. However, the most successful solution was found in the consolidation of rural school districts. The movement began in the United States with the passing of an act in New York in 1864, quickly spread throughout New England, and found its greatest success in Ohio, Indiana and Iowa. Consolidation involved the concentration of a number of small, scattered country schools into one large school consisting of three to five rooms; the provision of a well-qualified teaching staff; and the transporting of students to and from the school in horse-drawn vans.

In Canada, the earliest attempt at solving the rural school problem occurred late in 1902, Sir William Macdonald, the Montreal tobacco manufacturer and philanthropist, made available to Professor James Robertson, at that time Dominion Agricultural and Dairying Commissioner, a sum of money which was to be used for the introduction of practical work into country schools of Eastern Canada. The objectives of the "Macdonald Movement" were twofold – to encourage the consolidation of rural schools, and to promote the development of those subjects most compatible with agrarian life, namely nature study, manual training and domestic science.

The first step by the Macdonald Rural Schools Fund was to establish model school gardens at five rural schools in each of the five eastern provinces. The students were responsible for the care of their own garden plots of approximately 36 square feet each. They learned practical lessons of proper seed selection, rotation of crops, and protection of crops from weeds, insects and disease. Supporters at the time hailed the school garden experiment, and one 1905 report described it as a means to "cultivate the sense of ownership and a social spirit of co-operation and mutual respect for one another's rights."

Coinciding with the school garden experiment was the construction of four model consolidated schools at Middleton, Nova Scotia in 1903; at Kingston, New Brunswick and Guelph the following year; and at Hillsborough, Prince Edward Island in 1905. Macdonald agreed to subsidize the schools during the first three years of their existence and it was hoped that after that time, funding would be assumed by either the province or local bodies once the worthiness of the experiment had been demonstrated.

From the beginning, rural school trustees saw the advantages of consolidation. It was clear that regular and increased attendance would be assured, and by conveying pupils in horse-drawn vans children would be less exposed to damp and cold weather. There was also the advantage of a more sophisticated classroom situation and children could now progress through the various grades within their peer group. The Macdonald Fund set an example as well for the teachers who were carefully selected and then sent to special courses at Columbia and Cornell Universities. In general, the costs of education a student were lower than before consolidation, since students stayed at school longer and general attendance increased – in some cases as high as 90 percent from as low as 60 percent before consolidation.

Notwithstanding these advantages, the rural public in eastern Canada did not immediately embrace the ideals of the Macdonald Movement. Although most believed that the results of consolidation were positive, some districts voted to return to the one room schoolhouse, since the expense of transporting children produced an increase in their annual operating costs.

Consolidation was more successful in the prairies where provincial departments of education in the West provided the initial stimulus and funding required rather than relying on the Macdonald Fund.

== Guelph ==
The Macdonald Consolidated School at Guelph was typical of the schools established by Sir William in eastern Canada. It was built adjacent to the Ontario Agricultural College on a 2 ½ acre site close to Macdonald Institute, which had been a gift from Sir William in 1903. He established the institute to provide women, especially rural women, with a thorough education in the domestic sciences, and as a training centre for teachers. He also paid for Macdonald Hall, built in 1903 as a residence for students who attended courses at the institute.

Local school trustees received $38,000 for the property and construction of Macdonald Consolidated School. The building was designed by George M. Miller who headed one of the busiest agricultural firms in Toronto at the turn of the century. A native of Port Hope, Ontario, Miller began practising in Toronto as an architect in 1885. He designed many churches and public buildings throughout Ontario during his long career, his most notable accomplishment being the Lillian Massey Food Sciences Building at the University of Toronto (1908–12). He was also involved in the designs for Massey Hall as part of the numbers projects he worked on for the Massey family. His connection with the University of Guelph campus began in 1901 when his firm was contracted to design the Massey Library, and following this, Macdonald Institute. Both buildings are imposing and noteworthy for their stylistic eclecticism and rich terracotta colouration.

Unfortunately, the amount provided by the fund for the construction of Macdonald Consolidated School was not sufficient to allow the construction of a building of similar stature. In planning the new school, the trustees had underestimated costs and consequently had to cut corners. Design changes made without Sir William's knowledge resulted in a plain building with a utilitarian façade and simple peak-roofed porch over the front entrance. He was so enraged on opening day in 1904 that he refused to leave his carriage. Two hours later he boarded a train and never again returned to Guelph.

A few years later, the school trustees raised enough money to embellish the façade with a neo-classical wooden porch that boasted Doric columns and the school's name proudly inscribed across the front. Since then, the exterior of the building has remained the same.

The school was constructed of brick on a dressed stone foundation. The basement contained four large lunch and playrooms and on the first floor there were classrooms, a manual training room and a ladies' waiting room. Additional classrooms were on the second floor plus a laboratory for chemistry and nature study, domestic science room and principal's office. An assembly hall to seat 200 with stage and dressing rooms was on the third floor. The grounds contained a large garden, with individual plots for each student, a class plot and plots devoted to experimental work.

At the time of opening in November 1904, four school sections to the north and south of the school had agreed to consolidate. A fifth section was admitted to the consolidation a few months later. The staff consisted of the principal, Mr. Hodson, and three teachers; the enrollment totaled 175. The school was managed by a board of fifteen – three from each section, and trustees' meetings were held monthly.

Rural pupils attending Macdonald Consolidated were transported to school in six horse-drawn vans, while those in town came by street car. During its early years, the school was noted for its nature garden, the produce of which was canned and bottled in the domestic science classes. Much of the produce helped to provide the hot lunches which were another distinctive feature of the school.

The course of study covered regular public school subjects and some high school work, in addition to manual training, domestic science, agriculture, music, drawing and watercolours.

Classes at Macdonald Consolidated were frequently used for practice teaching throughout the period when a normal school program was offered at the Macdonald Institute. Students would come to the school to teach various forms of domestic science, such as cooking and sewing. A similar liaison was held with the Ontario Agricultural College – while the girls were being trained in home economics, the boys would receive lessons in manual training from male instructors from the college.
