= Symbiezidium =

Scientific classification
- Kingdom: Plantae
- Division: Marchantiophyta
- Class: Jungermanniopsida
- Order: Lejeuneales
- Family: Lejeuneaceae; Gradst.
- Genus: Symbiezidium; Trevis.

Synonyms
- Platylejeunea (Spruce) Schiffn.

Genus of liverworts

Symbiezidium is a genus of liverworts in the family Lejeuneaceae.

They are mainly found in central America and on the islands of Madagascar, Japan and Papua New Guinea.

== Species ==
As accepted by GBIF;

- Symbiezidium barbiflorum (Lindenb. & Gottsche) A.Evans
- Symbiezidium dentatum Herzog
- Symbiezidium kroneanum (Stephani) Stephani
- Symbiezidium madagascariense Steph.
- Symbiezidium transversale (Sw.) Trevis.
- Symbiezidium viridissimum (Lindenb.) Trevis.
