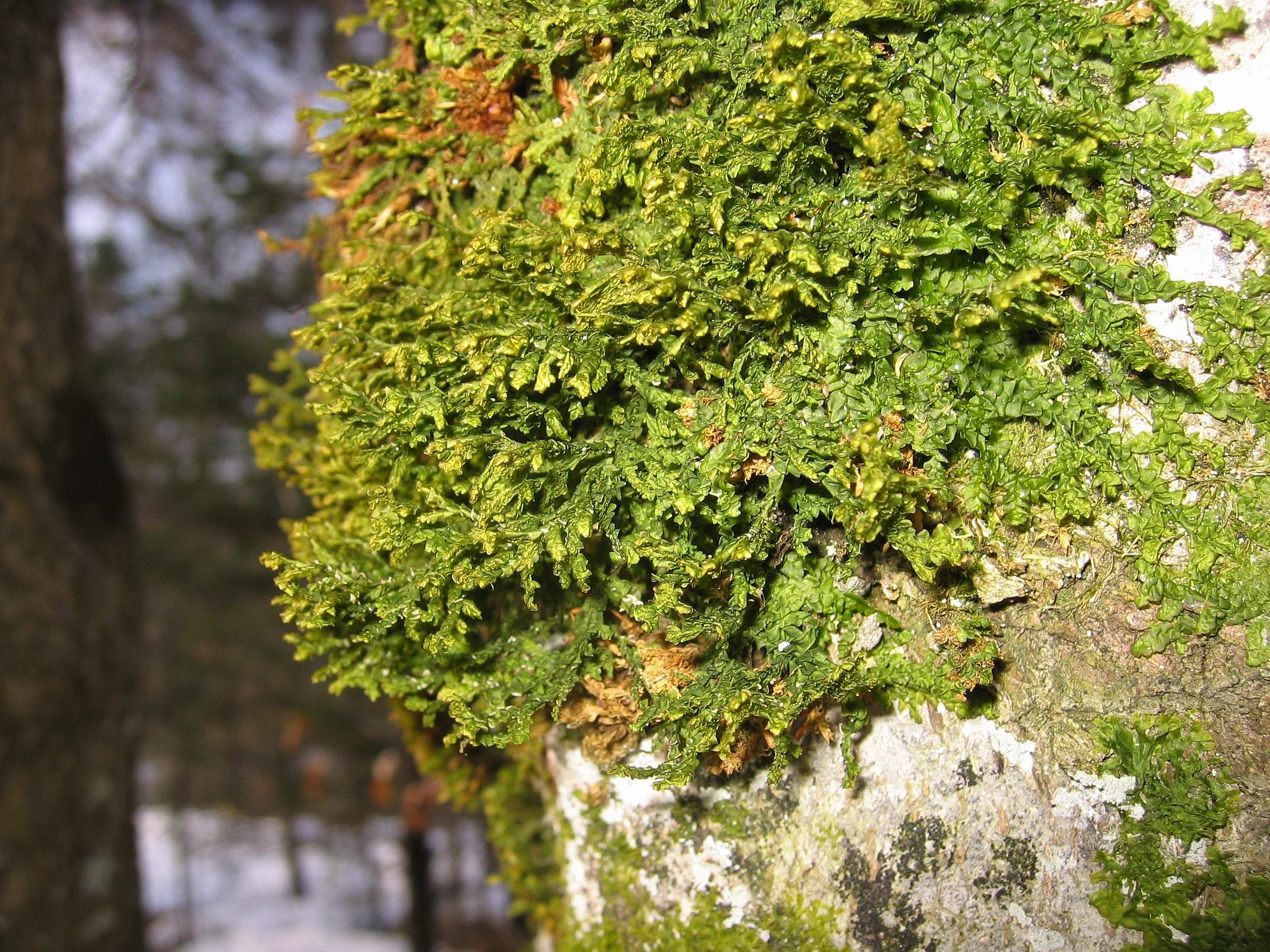
- Porella platyphylla

Scientific classification
- Kingdom: Plantae
- Division: Marchantiophyta
- Class: Jungermanniopsida
- Order: Porellales
- Family: Porellaceae; Cavers, 1910, nom. cons.

Genera
- See text

= Porellaceae =

Family of liverworts

Porellaceae is a family of liverworts in the order Porellales. It which originally created with just two genera, Ascidiota, and Porella.

It had up to 8 genera;

- Antoiria Raddi, 1818 (1)
- Ascidiota C.Massal., 1898 (3)
- Bellincinia Raddi, 1818
- Macvicaria W.E.Nicholson, 1930 (1)
- Opeca J.Hill, 1773
- Pandulfia Leman, 1825
- Porella L., 1753 (265)
- Suaresia Leman, 1827

Figures in brackets denote how many species per genus.

Bellincinia, Opeca, Pandulfia and Suaresia have yet to be confirmed as true genera.

World Flora Online only accepts genera; Ascidiota, Porella and Schulthesia Raddi. But Schulthesia is classed as unchecked.
