= Lois Clark =

American botanist (1884–1967)

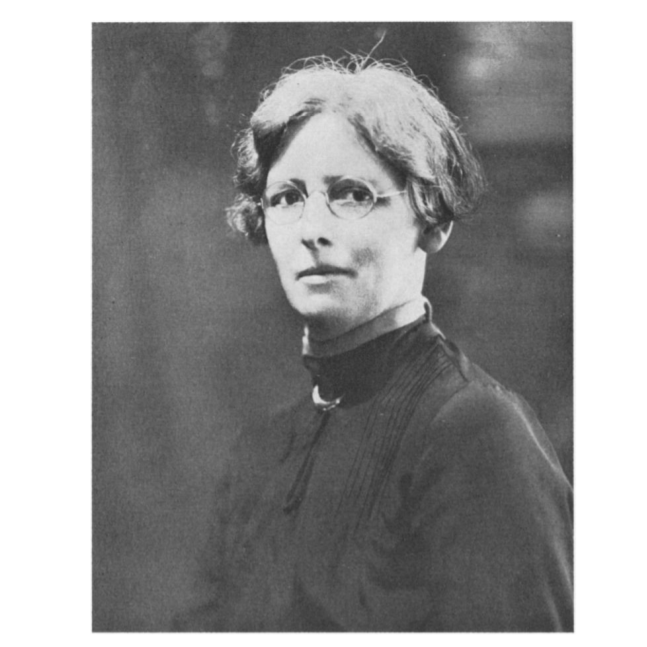
- Born: December 11, 1884; Charlotte, Michigan, U.S.
- Died: December 30, 1967 (aged 83)

Academic background
- Education: University of Washington (BS); University of Minnesota (PhD)

Academic work
- Discipline: Botany
- Sub-discipline: Bryology
- Institutions: Stephens College; University of Washington; University of Idaho

Lois Clark (December 11, 1884 – December 30, 1967) was an American botanist, bryologist, and professor who studied plants of the Northwestern United States, particularly the genus Frullania. She taught at the University of Idaho and the University of Washington. The standard author abbreviation L.Clark is used to indicate this person as the author when citing a botanical name.

== Early life and education ==
Lois Clark was born in Charlotte, Michigan, in 1884. Very shortly after her birth, Clark's family moved to Seattle, Washington, where Clark spent the majority of her life in the Pacific Northwest until her death in 1967.

Clark began her academic career by being educated through the Seattle Public Schools from 1898 to 1903. Afterwards, under the careful guidance of T.C. Frye, a renowned byrologist, Clark earned her bachelor's degree in 1907 from the University of Washington. In 1907, Clark became a graduate student at Yale University in order to study and learn from A. W. Evans, a heptaicologist well known in the scientific community. Clark remained at Yale for a year (1917-1918) and after became a botany student and assistant to the University of Minnesota. Upon the completion of her dissertation, which outlined the embryology of Podo- phyllum peltatum, Clark received her PhD from the University of Minnesota in 1919.

== Career and research ==
=== Teaching ===
Clark held a brief career as an educator in different colleges in the United States. Between 1919 and 1920, Clark briefly taught in Alaska in order to jumpstart her teaching career. She would later hold the position of both the head of the Science Division at Stephens College in Columbia, Missouri that same academic year. At the University of Idaho between 1923 and 1928, Clark held an assistant professorship in botany while beginning to lay the groundwork to conduct her own research on Heptaicae. Clark also taught summer classes in botany at the University of Washington during this period of time.

=== Research ===
Clark's extensive research career on Heptaicae, which consumed the latter half of her life, would have her categorize and label numerous plants, mosses, and liverworts that were undocumented in the Pacific Northwest and beyond. Her first publication was co-authored with T.C. Frye in 1928, The Liverworts of the Northwest, which detailed and labeled various liverworts in the Pacific Northwest in their books that were previously unknown about beforehand. Her research with Frye consisted of work identifying plants in the herbarium at the University of Washington, which consumed most of her life from 1933 to 1962. Together with him she distributed the exsiccata-like series Hepaticae: Distributed by Clark & Frye. At the herbarium, Clark determined many of the Heptaicae at the University of Washington, a few of which she even collected from the wild herself. Clark also published thirty-five scientific articles in the field of botany on her own and co-published sixty similar articles along both Frye and Ruth Sivihla. She also wrote Her most notable contribution was a five-part series on The Hepaticae of North America, which she helped complete alongside Frye between 1937 and 1947.

==== Hepaticae from Attu Island ====
Working alongside Frye at the University of Washington, Clark helped to identify lichens, vascular plants, and bryophytes that were collected by Robert M. Hardy in 1945 on Attu Island, the western part of the Aleutian Island chain. These plants from Attu Island were recorded in The Heptaicae of North America in the fall of 1945 and published again in The Bryologist in June 1946.

==== Heptaicae from Alaska ====
Clark and Frye also received Heptaicae specimens from Alaska which they identified at the University of Washington and published an article in The Bryologist on their findings in June 1942. Many of their specimens that were collected were located far away from vehicle-travelled roads and roughly five miles away from sources of salt water. They also had difficulty processing the Alaskan biological material because they parties responsible, in their opinion, did not bother to separate larger plants from smaller ones and, "almost all of the collecting has been done by those who do not know a moss from a liverwort, and who were not primarily interested in bryophytes." Clark and Frye go on to describe the qualities that are desired for a good collector of Heptaicae in order to demonstrate the point that these samples were not collected carefully enough. They also go on to state in their article that since Alaska is so large, there are many more Heptaicae to be discovered and classified.

==== Frullania Atrata ====
In December 1945 Clark wrote an article with Ruth Dowell Svihla documenting Frullania Atrata in The Bryologist. Their work, conducted at the University of Washington, closely detailed and classified these specific species of the genus Frullania that were located from several South American countries and Mexico. Clark's work on the classification of Frullania was highly revered and respected amongst the scientific community.

=== Affiliations ===
Sigma XI and the American Bryological Society claimed Lois Clark as a member. Clark was also a Fellow of the American Association for the Advancement of Science.

== Works ==
- Clark, Lois (1909). Some noteworthy Hepaticae from the state of Washington. OCLC 248009276.
- Clark, Lois (1953). Some Hepaticae from the Galapagos, Cocos, and other Pacific coast islands. The Academy. OCLC 4636409.
- Clark, Lois; Frye, Theodore C (1976). The liverworts of the Northwest. OCLC 276869215.
- Clark, Lois (1919). The Embryogeny of podophyllum peltatum ... by Lois Clark ... 1919. I. OCLC 459280956.
