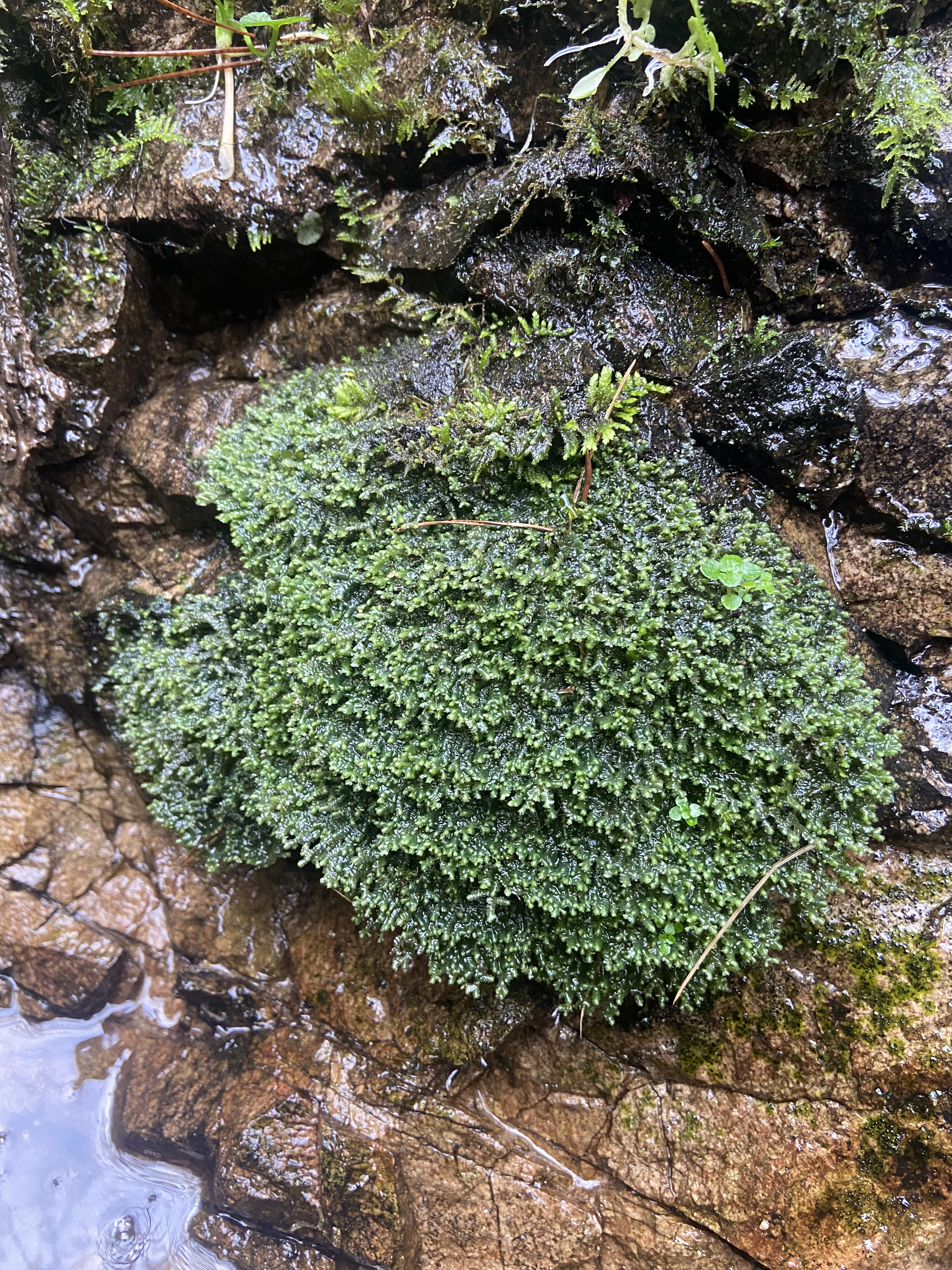
- Jubula hutchinsiae growing on stream-side rock in a humid ravine in Ireland.

Scientific classification
- Kingdom: Plantae
- Division: Marchantiophyta
- Class: Jungermanniopsida
- Order: Jubulales
- Family: Jubulaceae
- Genus: Jubula; Dumort.

Species
- See text

= Jubula (plant) =

Genus of liverworts

Jubula is a genus of liverwort in the family Jubulaceae. Jubula taxonomy is complex with different subspecies found across much of the planet. J. hutchinsiae subsp. hutchinsiae can be found across western Europe, with population strongholds in Britain and Ireland. This liverwort demands high humidity in southern-temperate environments, often found near waterfalls.

Named after 18th Century Irish botanist Ellen Hutchins who described the species as new to science.

== Species ==
Species within Jubula include;

- Jubula blepharophylla Grolle
- Jubula cambouena Stephani
- Jubula complanata (L.) Corda
- Jubula hattorii Udar & V.Nath
- Jubula himalayensis S.C.Srivast. & D.Sharma
- Jubula hutchinsiae (Hook.) Dumort.
- Jubula japonica Stephani
- Jubula kwangsiensis C.Gao & K.C.Chang
- Jubula pennsylvanica (Steph.) A. Evans

They have a scattered distribution worldwide, except not being found in mainland Africa.
