= Jubulaceae =

Scientific classification
- Kingdom: Plantae
- Division: Marchantiophyta
- Class: Jungermanniopsida
- Order: Jubulales
- Family: Jubulaceae; H.Klinggr.

Family of liverworts

The family Jubulaceae is a family of liverworts. The family name is derived from the genus Jubula.

== Genera ==
According to GBIF;

- Amphijubula – 3 sp.
- Jubula Dumort. – 19 sp.
- Neohattoria Kamim. – 3 sp.
- Nipponolejeunea S.Hatt. – 3 sp.
- Salviatus S.F.Gray, 1821
- Schusterella – 6 sp.
- Steerea – 2 sp.
