= Franz Stephani =

German bryologist (1842–1927)

Franz Stephani (15 April 1842 – 23 February 1927) was a German bryologist specializing in liverworts. This botanist is denoted by the author abbreviation Steph. when citing a botanical name.

Stephani was born in Berlin, Province of Brandenburg, in 1842. He attended and graduated from the Königliches Gymnasium, whereupon he began training to be a businessman in the wool-spinning industry. He worked both in a toy shop, and in a publishing house. In 1869, he married Marie Kell, daughter of the novelist Julius Kell and had two children. By the age of 34, Stephani began publishing papers on the subject of liverworts. He never attended university, and it is not known how his interest in bryology was sparked.

Stephani is most remembered for his Species Hepaticarum, a six-volume attempt to catalog all of the world's species of liverworts and hornworts. In 1894 Stephani met with M. W. Barbey-Boissier, son-in-law of Edmond Boissier and owner of the Barbey-Boissier Herbarium in Geneva. In 1897 the Herbarium concluded an agreement with Stephani, by which they would publish Species Hepaticarum. Stephani in turn bequeathed them his herbarium, drawings, library, notes and scientific correspondence. The first editions of the work appeared in 1898, in the Bulletin de l'Herbier Boissier, and the final volume 27 years later, in 1925.

This is the only work that has ever attempted such a broad treatment of those groups, and saw the first publication of many new names. Almost 10,000 species are included, with more than 4,000 new ones described by Stephani. Unfortunately, the work is "often much condemned" for being of very poor quality, and "holds the reputation of being one of the most notorious publications in bryology."

In the first decades of this [20th] century, systematic work in hepaticology received a lasting shock, in consequence of the publication by Stephani of his six-volume Species Hepaticarum (1898–1924). Although originally a conscientious, if not critical, hepaticologist, Stephani was eventually overwhelmed by the endless stream of exotic material sent to him for study. As a result, the last volumes of his work exhibit so much irresponsibility that a tremendous burden is now thrown on the shoulders of other workers, present and future.

Stephani created many new names for species that already had published names, and later researchers were left to sort out the nomenclature problems his work created. It is estimated perhaps only 25 to 35% of his species will prove to be valid upon investigation. A more precise figure cannot be made because "taxonomists are still busy clearing the mess."

The poor quality of Stephani's work in his later years may have been the result of a progressive brain disease that affected work on the final three volumes, and the remnants of his life's work were published posthumously by Bonner in 1953.

== Selected publications ==
- Stephani, F. (1898–1924). Species Hepaticarum, vols. I–VI. Geneva.
