= List of lichens of Maryland =

The following list of lichens of Maryland is derived from the following sources:

- (1) lichens listed in the 1977 publication by Skorepa (Allen C. Skorepa), Norden , and Windler.
- (2) lichens listed in the 1979 publication by Skorepa, Norden, and Windler.
- (3) lichens listed in the 2002 publication by Biechele as occurring on Maryland's Delmarva Peninsula.
- (4) lichens in Elmer Worthley's personal herbarium.
- (5) lichens found in Maryland by Edward Uebel.
- (6) lichens reported on Maryland's Delmarva Peninsula by Lendemer and Knapp (2007) at six locations: 1. Millington State Wildlife Management Area (1. Millington); 2. Idylwild State Wildlife Management Area (2. Idylwild); 3. Chesapeake State Forest (3. Chesapeake); 4. Sharptown Dunes (4. Sharptown); 5. Hickory Point Cypress Swamp (5. Hickory Pt.); 6. Pocomoke State Forest (6. Pocomoke).

== List ==
1. Acarospora fuscata (Schrader) Arnold [Acarosporaceae]
  1. Skorepa et al. (1979) – on acidic rock.
  2. E.G. Worthley Herbarium - Carroll Co., on stone wall.
  3. E.C. Uebel Herbarium – Lichens of Soldiers Delight.
2. Acarospora schleicheri (Ach.) A. Massal. [Acarosporaceae]
  1. Skorepa et al. (1977) – Lichens of Soldiers Delight.
  2. Skorepa et al. (1979) – on acidic rock.
3. Ahtiana aurescens (Tuck.) Thell & Randlane [Parmeliaceae]
  1. Syn.: Cetraria aurescens Tuck.
  2. Skorepa et al. (1977) – Allegany Co., on branches of pines.
  3. Skorepa et al. (1979) – on bark.
4. Allocetraria oakesiana (Tuck.) Randlane & Thell [Parmeliaceae]
  1. Syn.: Cetraria oakesiana Tuck.
  2. Skorepa et al. (1977) – Frederick Co., base of oak.
  3. Skorepa et al. (1979) – on bark, acidic rock.
  4. E.G. Worthley Herbarium - Garrett Co., along Big Run, on stumps.
5. Amandinea milliaria (Tuck.) P. May & Sheard [Physciaceae]
  1. Syn.: Rinodina milliaria Tuck.
  2. Skorepa et al. (1977) – Calvert Co., on trunks of deciduous trees.
  3. Skorepa et al. (1979) – on bark.
  4. Biechele (2002) – lower eastern shore of Maryland.
6. Amandinea polyspora (Willey) E. Lay & P. May [Physciaceae]
  1. Syn.: Buellia polyspora (Willey) Vainio
  2. Skorepa et al. (1977) – Carroll Co., bark of deciduous tree.
  3. Skorepa et al. (1979) – on bark.
  4. E.C. Uebel Herbarium – Baltimore Co., Ridge Rd., on bark of Norway Maple.
7. Amandinea punctata (Hoffm.) Coppins & Scheid. [Physciaceae]
  1. Syn.: Buellia punctata (Hoffm.) Massal.
  2. Skorepa et al. (1977) – Worcester Co., on oak twigs.
  3. Skorepa et al. (1979) – on bark.
  4. Lendemer & Knapp (2007) - (2. Idylwild)
8. Anaptychia palmulata (Michaux) Vainio [Physciaceae]
  1. Skorepa et al. (1977) – Calvert Co., trunks of deciduous trees.
  2. Skorepa et al. (1979) – on bark.
  3. Biechele (2002) – lower eastern shore of Maryland.
  4. E.G. Worthley Herbarium - Baltimore Co.; Calvert Co.; Frederick Co.
9. Anisomeridium polypori (Ellis & Everh.) M.E. Barr [Monoblastiaceae]
  1. Lendemer & Knapp (2007) - (4. Sharptown)
10. Anzia americana Yoshim. & Sharp [Parmeliaceae]
  1. Lendemer & Knapp (2007) - (6. Pocomoke)
11. Anzia colpodes (Ach.) Stizenb. [Parmeliaceae]
  1. Skorepa et al. (1979) – on bark.
  2. Lendemer & Knapp (2007) - (6. Pocomoke)
12. Arctoparmelia centrifuga? (L.) Hale [Parmeliaceae]
  1. E.G. Worthley Herbarium - Baltimore Co., Owings Mills.
13. Arthonia caesia (Flotow) Körber [Arthoniaceae]
  1. Skorepa et al. (1977) – Baltimore Co., trunk of oak.
  2. Skorepa et al. (1979) – on bark.
  3. E.C. Uebel Herbarium – Baltimore Co., Liberty Reservoir, on bark; Ridge Road, on bark.
  4. Lendemer & Knapp (2007) (1. Millington)
14. Arthonia rubella (Fée) Nyl. [Arthoniaceae]
  1. Lendemer & Knapp (2007) - (5. Hickory Pt.), (6. Pocomoke)
15. Arthopyrenia cinereopruinosa (Schaerer) A. Massal. [Arthopyreniaceae]
  1. Syn.: Arthopyrenia pinicola (Hepp) Mass.
  2. Skorepa et al. (1977) – Montgomery Co., trunk of elm.
  3. Skorepa et al. (1979) – on bark.
16. Arthothelium interveniens (Nyl.) Zahlbr. [Arthoniales]
  1. Lendemer & Knapp (2007) - (6. Pocomoke)
17. Aspicilia caesiocinerea (Nyl. ex Malbr.) Arnold [Hymeneliaceae]
  1. Syn.: Lecanora caesiocinerea Nyl.
  2. Skorepa et al. (1977) – Allegany Co., on shale outcrop.
  3. Skorepa et al. (1979) – on acidic rock.
  4. E.G. Worthley Herbarium - Lichens of Soldiers Delight; Montgomery Co., Great Falls.
  5. E.C. Uebel Herbarium – Baltimore Co., Liberty Reservoir, on acidic rock.
18. Aspicilia cinerea (L.) Körber [Hymeneliaceae]
  1. Syn.: Lecanora cinerea (L.) Somm.
  2. Skorepa et al. (1977) – Baltimore Co., on rock ledges.
  3. Skorepa et al. (1979) – on acidic rock.
  4. E.G. Worthley Herbarium - Frederick Co., Cunningham Falls.
19. Bacidia laurocerasi (Delise ex Duby) Zahlbr. subsp. laurocerasi [Bacidiaceae]
  1. Syn.: Bacidia atrogrisea (Delilse ex Hepp) Körber
  2. Skorepa et al. (1979) – on bark.
20. Bacidia polychroa (Th. Fr.) Körber [Bacidiaceae]
  1. Syn.: Bacidia fuscorubella (Hoffm.) Bausch.
  2. Skorepa et al. (1977) – Baltimore Co., on trunks of deciduous trees.
  3. Skorepa et al. (1979) – on bark.
21. Bacidia schweinitzii (Fr. ex E. Michener) A. Schneider [Bacidiaceae]
  1. Skorepa et al.. (1977) – Montgomery Co., on oak.
  2. Skorepa et al. (1979) – on bark.
  3. Biechele (2002) – lower eastern shore of Maryland.
  4. E.G. Worthley Herbarium – Lichens of Soldiers Delight; Anne Arundel Co., Baltimore Co., Wicomico Co.
  5. Lendemer & Knapp (2007) - (2. Idylwild), (4. Sharptown), (5. Hickory Pt.), (6. Pocomoke)
22. Bacidia trachona (Ach.) Lettau [Bacidiaceae]
  1. Skorepa et al. (1979) – on calcareous rock.
23. Bacidina egenula (Nyl.) Vězda [Bacidiaceae]
  1. Lendemer & Knapp (2007) - (5. Hickory Pt.)
24. Bacidina inundata (Fr.) Vezda [Bacidiaceae]
  1. Skorepa et al. (1979) – on bark.
25. Baculifera curtisii (Tuck.) Marbach [Physciaceae]
  1. Syn.: Buellia curtisii (Tuck.) Imsh.
  2. Skorepa et al.. (1977) – Calvert Co., trunk of deciduous tree.
  3. Skorepa et al. (1979) – on bark.
26. Bathelium carolinianum (Tuck.) R.C. Harris [Trypetheliaceae]
  1. Lendemer & Knapp (2007) - (6. Pocomoke)
27. Biatora vernalis (L.) Fr. [Bacidiaceae]
  1. Syn.: Lecidea vernalis (L.) Ach.
  2. Skorepa et al. (1977) – Frederick Co., on trunks of oaks.
  3. Skorepa et al. (1979) – on bark.
28. Brigantiaea leucoxantha (Spreng.) R. Sant. & Haffel. [Brigantiaeaceae]
  1. Biechele (2002) – lower eastern shore of Maryland.
  2. Lendemer & Knapp (2007) - (5. Hickory Pt.), (6. Pocomoke)
29. Bryoria furcellata (Fr.) Brodo & D. Hawksw. [Parmeliaceae]
  1. Syn.: Alectoria nidulifera Norrl.
  2. Skorepa et al. (1977) – Garrett Co., on pine trunks.
  3. Skorepa et al. (1979) – on bark, acid rock.
  4. E.G. Worthley Herbarium - Wicomico Co.
30. Buellia badia (Fr.) Massal. [Physciaceae]
  1. Syn.: Buellia turgescens Tuck.
  2. E.G. Worthley Herbarium - Baltimore Co., St. Thomas Cemetery.
31. Buellia curtisii (Tuck.) Imshaug [Physciaceae]
  1. Lendemer & Knapp (2007) (1. Millington), (3. Chesapeake)
32. Buellia spuria (Schaerer) Anzi [Physciaceae]
  1. Skorepa et al. (1977) – Montgomery Co. (collection by Fink)
  2. Skorepa et al. (1979) – on acidic rock.
  3. E.G. Worthley Herbarium – Lichens of Soldiers Delight.
33. Buellia stigmaea Tuck. [Physciaceae]
  1. Skorepa et al. (1977) – Baltimore Co., (collected by Plitt)
  2. Skorepa et al. (1979) – on acidic rock.
34. Buellia stillingiana J. Steiner [Physciaceae]
  1. Skorepa et al. (1977) – Calvert Co., on trunks of deciduous trees.
  2. Skorepa et al. (1979) – on bark.
  3. Biechele (2002) – lower eastern shore of Maryland.
  4. E.G. Worthley Herbarium - Worcester Co.
  5. Lendemer & Knapp (2007) - (4. Sharptown)
35. Buellia vernicoma Tuck. [Physciaceae]
  1. Lendemer & Knapp (2007) - (6. Pocomoke)
36. Byssoloma leucoblepharum Vainio [Pilocarpaceae]
  1. Lendemer & Knapp (2007) - (5. Hickory Pt.), (6. Pocomoke)
37. Byssoloma meadii (Tuck.) S. Ekman [Pilocarpaceae]
  1. Lendemer & Knapp (2007) - (5. Hickory Pt.), (6. Pocomoke)
38. Calicium salicinum Pers. [Caliciaceae]
  1. Lendemer & Knapp (2007) - (6. Pocomoke)
39. Caloplaca camptidia (Tuck.) Zahlbr. [Teloschistaceae]
  1. Skorepa et al. (1977) – Montgomery Co., oak woods.
  2. Skorepa et al. (1979) – on bark.
40. Caloplaca cerina (Ehrh. ex Hedwig) Th. Fr. [Teloschistaceae]
  1. Skorepa et al. (1977) – Garrett Co., on aspen trunks.
  2. Skorepa et al. (1979) – on bark.
41. Caloplaca citrina (Hoffm.) Th. Fr. [Teloschistaceae]
  1. Skorepa et al. (1977) – Baltimore Co., on concrete bridge.
  2. Skorepa et al. (1979) – on cement.
  3. Biechele (2002) – lower eastern shore of Maryland.
  4. E.G. Worthley Herbarium – Lichens of Soldiers Delight; Baltimore Co., on wall of stone and cement.
42. Caloplaca feracissima H. Magn. [Teloschistaceae]
  1. Skorepa et al. (1977) – Frederick Co., on concrete.
  2. Skorepa et al. (1979) – on cement.
  3. E.G. Worthley Herbarium – Lichens of Soldiers Delight.
  4. E.C. Uebel Herbarium – Prince George's Co., on hill of concrete.
43. Caloplaca flavorubescens (Hudson) J. R. Laundon [Teloschistaceae]
  1. Syn.: Caloplaca aurantiaca (Lightf.) Th. Fr.
  2. Skorepa et al. (1977) – Allegany Co., on cement.
  3. Skorepa et al. (1979) – on cement.
  4. E.G. Worthley Herbarium - Baltimore Co., Owings Mills.
44. Caloplaca flavovirescens (Wulfen) Dalla Torre & Sarnth.
  1. Skorepa et al. (1977) – Washington Co., on limestone.
  2. Skorepa et al. (1979) – on calcareous rock, cement.
45. Caloplaca holocarpa (Hoffm. ex Ach.) M. Wade [Teloschistaceae]
  1. Skorepa et al. (1977) – Frederick Co., on timbers.
  2. Skorepa et al. (1979) – on bark, calcareous rock, wood.
46. Caloplaca lobulata (Flörke) de Lesd. [Teloschistaceae]
  1. Skorepa et al. (1977) – Cecil Co., on serpentine rock.
  2. Skorepa et al. (1979) – acidic rock.
  3. E.G. Worthley Herbarium – Lichens of Soldiers Delight; Baltimore Co., on bricks.
47. Caloplaca microphyllina (Tuck.) Hasse [Teloschistaceae]
  1. Skorepa et al. (1979) – wood.
48. Caloplaca oxfordensis Fink [Teloschistaceae]
  1. Skorepa et al. (1977) – Washington Co., on limestone.
  2. Skorepa et al. (1979) – on acidic rock.
49. Caloplaca sideritis (Tuck.) Zahlbr. [Teloschistaceae]
  1. Skorepa et al. (1977) – Frederick Co., on cement foundation.
  2. Skorepa et al. (1979) – on acidic rock.
  3. E.G. Worthley Herbarium – Lichens of Soldiers Delight.
50. Caloplaca subsoluta (Nyl.) Zahlbr. [Teloschistaceae]
  1. Syn.: Caloplaca modesta (Zahlbr.) Fink
  2. Skorepa et al. (1977) – Montgomery Co. (collected by Fink)
  3. Skorepa et al. (1979) – on acidic rock.
51. Candelaria concolor (Dickson) B. Stein [Candelariaceae]
  1. Skorepa et al. (1977) – Allegany Co., on tree trunk.
  2. Skorepa et al. (1979) – on bark.
  3. E.G. Worthley Herbarium – Lichens of Soldiers Delight; Frederick Co.; Carroll Co.
  4. E.C. Uebel Herbarium – Baltimore Co.; Prince George's Co., on bark.
  5. Lendemer & Knapp (2007) - (2. Idylwild)
52. Candelariella reflexa (Nyl.) Lettau [Candelariaceae]
  1. Lendemer & Knapp (2007) - (3. Chesapeake)
53. Candelariella vitellina (Hoffm.) Müll. Arg. [Candelariaceae]
  1. Skorepa et al. (1977) – Baltimore Co., on rock face.
  2. Skorepa et al. (1979) – on acidic rock.
  3. E.G. Worthley Herbarium – Lichens of Soldiers Delight.
54. Canoparmelia caroliniana (Nyl.) Elix & Hale [Parmeliaceae]
  1. Syn.: Parmelia caroliniana Nyl.
  2. Skorepa et al. (1977) – Worcester Co., on tree trunks.
  3. Biechele (2002) – lower eastern shore of Maryland.
  4. Lendemer & Knapp (2007) - (2. Idylwild), (4. Sharptown), (6. Pocomoke)
55. Canoparmelia crozalsiana (de Lesd. ex Harm.) Elix & Hale [Parmeliaceae]
  1. Syn.: Parmelia crozalsiana B. de Lesd. ex Harm.
  2. Skorepa et al. (1977) – Frederick Co., on trunk of oak.
  3. Skorepa et al. (1979) – on bark.
  4. E.G. Worthley Herbarium - Talbot Co., on Sycamore.
  5. Lendemer & Knapp (2007) - (2. Idylwild)
56. Canoparmelia texana (Tuck.) Elix & Hale [Parmeliaceae]
  1. Syn.: Parmelia texana Tuck.
  2. Skorepa et al. (1977) – Frederick Co., on trunk of maple.
  3. Skorepa et al. (1979) – on bark.
  4. Lendemer & Knapp (2007) - (2. Idylwild)
57. Catapyrenium cinereum (Pers.) Körber [Verrucariaceae]
  1. Syn.: Dermatocarpon hepaticum (Ach.) Th. Fr.
  2. Skorepa et al. (1979) – on soil.
  3. E.G. Worthley Herbarium – Lichens of Soldiers Delight.
58. Catillaria chalybeia (Borrer) A. Massal. [Catillariaceae]
  1. Skorepa et al. (1977) – Frederick Co., on rocks.
  2. Skorepa et al. (1979) – on acidic rock.
59. Cetraria arenaria Kärnefelt [Parmeliaceae]
  1. Syn.: Cetraria islandica (L.) Ach.
  2. Skorepa et al. (1977) – Garrett Co., on soil.
  3. Skorepa et al. (1979) – on soil.
  4. E.G. Worthley Herbarium - Garrett Co., Carey Run.
60. Cetrelia cetrarioides (Duby) Culb. & C. Culb. [Parmeliaceae]
  1. E.G. Worthley Herbarium - Baltimore Co., Owings Mills, on oak.
61. Cetrelia chicitae (W. Culb.) W. Culb. & C. Culb. [Parmeliaceae]
  1. Skorepa et al. (1977) – Garrett Co., on conglomerate.
  2. Skorepa et al. (1979) – on bark, acidic rock.
  3. E.G. Worthley Herbarium - Frederick Co., Mt. Catoctin Park.
62. Cetrelia olivetorum (Nyl.) Culb. & C. Culb. [Parmeliaceae]
  1. Skorepa et al. (1977) – Allegany Co., on trunk of deciduous tree.
  2. Skorepa et al. (1979) – on bark.
63. Chrismofulvea dialyta (Nyl.) Marbach [Physciaceae]
  1. Syn.: Buellia dialyta (Nyl.) Tuck.
  2. Skorepa et al. (1979) – on bark.
64. Chrysothrix candelaris (L.) J. R. Laundon [Chrysotrichaceae]
  1. Syn.: Lepraria candelaris (L.) Fr.
  2. Skorepa et al. (1979) – on bark.
  3. E.G. Worthley Herbarium - Montgomery Co., on rock outcrop.
  4. E.C. Uebel Herbarium – Baltimore Co., Hollofield, on rock cliff.
  5. Lendemer & Knapp (2007) - (5. Hickory Pt.)
65. Chrysothrix flavovirens Tønsberg s. lat. [Chrysotrichaceae]
  1. Lendemer & Knapp (2007) - (5. Hickory Pt.)
66. Cladonia apodocarpa Robbins [Cladoniaceae]
  1. Skorepa et al. (1977) – Frederick Co., on soil.
  2. E.G. Worthley Herbarium - Lichens of Soldiers Delight; Baltimore Co., Gunpowder Falls; Allegany Co.
67. Cladonia arbuscula (Wallr.) Flotow [Cladoniaceae]
  1. Skorepa et al. (1977) – Lichens of Soldiers Delight.
  2. E.G. Worthley Herbarium - Lichens of Soldiers Delight; Allegany Co., Green Ridge State Forest; Wicomico Co.
  3. E.C. Uebel Herbarium – Lichens of Soldiers Delight.
68. Cladonia atlantica A. Evans [Cladoniaceae]
  1. Skorepa et al. (1977) – Lichens of Soldiers Delight.
  2. Biechele (2002) – lower eastern shore of Maryland.
69. Cladonia beaumontii (Taylor) Vainio [Cladoniaceae]
  1. Biechele (2002) – lower eastern shore of Maryland.
70. Cladonia boryi Tuck. [Cladoniaceae]
  1. Skorepa et al. (1977) – Lichens of Soldiers Delight.
  2. This is probably a misidentification of Cladonia caroliniana.
71. Cladonia caespiticia (Pers.) Flörke [Cladoniaceae]
  1. Skorepa et al. (1977) – Worcester Co., on sandy soil.
  2. Biechele (2002) – lower eastern shore of Maryland.
  3. E.C. Uebel Herbarium – Lichens of Soldiers Delight; Carroll Co., Liberty Reservoir.
72. Cladonia cariosa (Ach.) Sprengel [Cladoniaceae]
  1. E.G. Worthley Herbarium - Lichens of Soldiers Delight.
73. Cladonia caroliniana Tuck. [Cladoniaceae]
  1. E.C. Uebel Herbarium – Lichens of Soldiers Delight.
74. Cladonia cervicornis subsp. verticillata (Hoffm.) Ahti [Cladoniaceae]
  1. Syn.: Cladonia verticillata (Hoffm.) Schaer.
  2. Skorepa et al. (1977) – Queen Anne's Co., on soil.
  3. Biechele (2002) – lower eastern shore of Maryland.
  4. E.G. Worthley Herbarium - Worcester Co.; Queen Anne's Co.; Baltimore Co.
75. Cladonia chlorophaea (Flörke ex Sommerf.) Sprengel [Cladoniaceae]
  1. Skorepa et al. (1977) – Lichens of Soldiers Delight.
  2. Biechele (2002) – lower eastern shore of Maryland.
  3. E.G. Worthley Herbarium - Lichens of Soldiers Delight; Prince George's Co.; Anne Arundel Co.; Washington Co.
76. Cladonia coniocraea (Flörke) Sprengel [Cladoniaceae]
  1. Skorepa et al. (1977) – Garrett Co., on base of pine.
  2. Biechele (2002) – lower eastern shore of Maryland.
  3. E.G. Worthley Herbarium - Baltimore Co.; Calvert Co.
  4. E.C. Uebel Herbarium – Lichens of Soldiers Delight; Baltimore Co., Liberty Reservoir.
77. Cladonia cristatella Tuck. [Cladoniaceae]
  1. Skorepa et al. (1977) – Lichens of Soldiers Delight.
  2. Biechele (2002) – lower eastern shore of Maryland.
  3. E.G. Worthley Herbarium - Lichens of Soldiers Delight; Prince George's Co.; Garrett Co., Swallow Falls.
  4. E.C. Uebel Herbarium – Lichens of Soldiers Delight; Prince George's Co., Greenbelt.
78. Cladonia didyma (Fée) Vainio var. didyma [Cladoniaceae]
  1. Lendemer & Knapp (2007) - (2. Idylwild)
79. Cladonia fimbriata (L.) Fr. [Cladoniaceae]
  1. Skorepa et al. (1977) – Garrett Co., on sandstone boulder.
  2. E.G. Worthley Herbarium - Garrett Co.; Allegany Co., Green Ridge State Forest.
80. Cladonia floerkeana (Fr.) Flörke [Cladoniaceae]
  1. Skorepa et al. (1977) – Harford Co., on rotting wood.
81. Cladonia furcata (Hudson) Schrader [Cladoniaceae]
  1. Skorepa et al. (1977) – Harford Co., on moss.
82. Cladonia gracilis (L.) Willd. subsp. gracilis [Cladoniaceae]
  1. Skorepa et al. (1977) – Lichens of Soldiers Delight.
  2. E.G. Worthley Herbarium - Lichens of Soldiers Delight.
83. Cladonia grayi Merr. ex Sandst. [Cladoniaceae]
  1. Biechele (2002) – lower eastern shore of Maryland.
  2. E.C. Uebel Herbarium – Lichens of Soldiers Delight.
  3. Lendemer & Knapp (2007) - (2. Idylwild), (3. Chesapeake)
84. Cladonia incrassata Flörke [Cladoniaceae]
  1. Skorepa et al. (1977) – Wicomico Co., on sandy soil.
  2. Lendemer & Knapp (2007) - (2. Idylwild), (6. Pocomoke)
85. Cladonia macilenta Hoffm. [Cladoniaceae]
  1. Skorepa et al. (1977) – Harford Co., on rotting wood.
  2. E.C. Uebel Herbarium – Carroll Co., Liberty Reservoir; Prince Georges Co., College Park.
  3. Lendemer & Knapp (2007) - (2. Idylwild)
86. Cladonia macilenta var. bacillaris (Genth) Schaerer [Cladoniaceae]
  1. Syn.: Cladonia bacillaris (Ach.) Nyl.
  2. Skorepa et al. (1977) – Lichens of Soldiers Delight.
  3. Biechele (2002) – lower eastern shore of Maryland.
  4. E.G. Worthley Herbarium - Prince George's Co.
  5. E.C. Uebel Herbarium – Carroll Co., Liberty Reservoir.
  6. Lendemer & Knapp (2007) - (3. Chesapeake)
87. Cladonia mateocyatha Robbins [Cladoniaceae]
  1. Skorepa et al. (1977) – Baltimore Co., on exposed rocks.
88. Cladonia ochrochlora Flörke [Cladoniaceae]
  1. Lendemer & Knapp (2007) - (1. Millington)
89. Cladonia parasitica (Hoffm.) Hoffm. [Cladoniaceae]
  1. Skorepa et al. (1977) – Worcester Co., on pine stump.
  2. Biechele (2002) – lower eastern shore of Maryland.
  3. Lendemer & Knapp (2007) - (2. Idylwild)
90. Cladonia peziziformis (With.) J.R. Laundon [Cladoniaceae]
  1. Syn.: Cladonia capitata (Michx.) Spreng.
  2. Skorepa et al. (1977) – Kent Co., on embankment.
  3. Biechele (2002) – lower eastern shore of Maryland.
  4. E.G. Worthley Herbarium - Lichens of Soldiers Delight.
  5. E.C. Uebel Herbarium – Lichens of Soldiers Delight; Prince George's Co., Greenbelt.
91. Cladonia piedmontensis G. Merr. [Cladoniaceae]
  1. Skorepa et al. (1977) – Wicomico Co., on soil.
  2. E.G. Worthley Herbarium - Baltimore Co.; Wicomico Co.
92. Cladonia pleurota (Flörke) Schaerer [Cladoniaceae]
  1. Skorepa et al. (1977) – Lichens of Soldiers Delight.
  2. Biechele (2002) – lower eastern shore of Maryland.
93. Cladonia polycarpia G. Merr. [Cladoniaceae]
  1. Lendemer & Knapp (2007) - (3. Chesapeake)
94. Cladonia polycarpoides Nyl. [Cladoniaceae]
  1. Biechele (2002) – lower eastern shore of Maryland.
  2. Lendemer & Knapp (2007) - (2. Idylwild)
95. Cladonia pyxidata (L.) Hoffm. [Cladoniaceae]
  1. Skorepa et al. (1977) – Allegany Co., on bank of stream.
  2. E.G. Worthley Herbarium - Allegany Co., Green Ridge State Forest; Anne Arundel Co.; Carroll Co.; Washington Co.
96. Cladonia ramulosa (With.) J.R. Laundon [Cladoniaceae]
  1. E.G. Worthley Herbarium - Worcester Co., Milburn Landing.
  2. Lendemer & Knapp (2007) - (2. Idylwild)
97. Cladonia rangiferina (L.) F.H. Wigg. [Cladoniaceae]
  1. Skorepa et al. (1977) – Allegany Co., on soil.
  2. E.G. Worthley Herbarium - Calvert Co.; Wicomico Co.
98. Cladonia rappii A. Evans [Cladoniaceae]
  1. Syn.: Cladonia calycantha Del. ex Nyl.
  2. Skorepa et al. (1977) – Charles Co., on soil.
  3. Biechele (2002) – lower eastern shore of Maryland.
  4. E.G. Worthley Herbarium - Wicomico Co.
99. Cladonia ravenelii Tuck. [Cladoniaceae]
  1. Biechele (2002) – lower eastern shore of Maryland.
100. Cladonia rei Schaerer [Cladoniaceae]
  1. Syn.: Cladonia nemoxyna (Ach.) Nyl.
  2. Skorepa et al. (1977) – Garrett Co., on rocky soil.
  3. E.G. Worthley Herbarium - Garrett Co.
  4. E.C. Uebel Herbarium – Lichens of Soldiers Delight.
101. Cladonia santensis Tuck. [Cladoniaceae]
  1. Skorepa et al. (1977) – Dorchester Co., on soil.
  2. Biechele (2002) – lower eastern shore of Maryland.
102. Cladonia squamosa Hoffm. [Cladoniaceae]
  1. Skorepa et al. (1977) – Frederick Co., on basalt outcrop.
  2. Biechele (2002) – lower eastern shore of Maryland.
  3. E.G. Worthley Herbarium - Lichens of Soldiers Delight; Washington Co.
  4. Lendemer & Knapp (2007) - (6. Pocomoke)
103. Cladonia stellaris (Opiz) Pouzar & Vezda [Cladoniaceae]
  1. Syn.: Cladonia alpestris (L.) Rabenh.
  2. Skorepa et al. (1977) – Garrett Co., on soil.
104. Cladonia strepsilis (Ach.) Grognot [Cladoniaceae]
  1. Skorepa et al. (1977) – Prince George's Co., on shoulder of road.
  2. E.G. Worthley Herbarium - Prince George's Co.
105. Cladonia subcariosa Nyl. [Cladoniaceae]
  1. Syns.: Cladonia clavulifera Vain., C. sobolescens Nyl. ex Vain.
  2. Skorepa et al. (1977) – Worcester Co., on sandy soil.
  3. Skorepa et al. (1977) – Kent Co., on soil.
  4. E.G. Worthley Herbarium - St. Mary's Co.; Wicomico Co.
  5. E.C. Uebel Herbarium – Lichens of Soldiers Delight; Prince George's Co., Greenbelt.
  6. Lendemer & Knapp (2007) - (2. Idylwild)
106. Cladonia subtenuis (Abbayes) Mattick [Cladoniaceae]
  1. Skorepa et al. (1977) – Lichens of Soldiers Delight.
  2. Biechele (2002) – lower eastern shore of Maryland.
  3. E.G. Worthley Herbarium - Lichens of Soldiers Delight; Allegany Co.; Calvert County; St. Mary's Co.
  4. E.C. Uebel Herbarium – Lichens of Soldiers Delight; Prince George's Co.
  5. Lendemer & Knapp (2007) - (2. Idylwild), (3. Chesapeake), (4. Sharptown)
107. Cladonia turgida Hoffm. [Cladoniaceae]
  1. Skorepa et al. (1977) – Wicomico Co., on soil.
108. Cladonia uncialis (L.) F.H. Wigg. [Cladoniaceae]
  1. Skorepa et al. (1977) – Lichens of Soldiers Delight.
  2. Biechele (2002) – lower eastern shore of Maryland.
109. Coccocarpia palmicola (Sprengel) Arv. & D.J. Galloway [Coccocarpiaceae]
  1. Syn.: Coccocarpia cronia (Tuck.) Vain.
  2. Skorepa et al. (1977) – Montgomery Co., on rock outcrop.
  3. Skorepa et al. (1979) – on bark, acidic rock.
110. Coenogonium luteum (Dicks.) Kalb & Lücking [Gyalectaceae]
  1. Lendemer & Knapp (2007) - (6. Pocomoke)
111. Coenogonium pineti (Ach.) Kalb & Lücking [Gyalectaceae]
  1. Syn.: Dimerella diluta (Pers.) Trevisan
  2. Skorepa et al. (1979) – on wood, other.
  3. Lendemer & Knapp (2007) - (5. Hickory Pt.)
112. Collema coccophorum Tuck. [Collemataceae]
  1. Skorepa et al. (1979) – on acidic rock.
113. Collema conglomeratum Hoffm. [Collemataceae]
  1. Skorepa et al. (1979) – on bark.
114. Collema furfuraceum (Arnold) Du Rietz [Collemataceae]
  1. Skorepa et al. (1977) – Allegany Co., on trunks of deciduous trees.
  2. Skorepa et al. (1979) – bark, acidic rock.
  3. E.G. Worthley Herbarium - Allegany Co., Terrapin Run, near base of tree trunk.
115. Collema fuscovirens (With.) J.R. Laundon [Collemataceae]
  1. Syn.: Collema tuniforme (Ach.) Ach.
  2. Skorepa et al. (1979) – on calcareous rock.
116. Collema leptaleum Tuck. [Collemataceae]
  1. Skorepa et al. (1979) – on bark.
117. Collema subflaccidum Degel. [Collemataceae]
  1. Skorepa et al. (1979) – acidic rock.
  2. E.G. Worthley Herbarium - Baltimore Co., Gunpowder River, on bark of Tulip Tree.
118. Collema undulatum Laurer ex Flotow [Collemataceae]
  1. Skorepa et al. (1979) – on acidic rock.
119. Cyphelium tigillare (Ach.) Ach. [Caliciaceae]
  1. Skorepa et al. (1979) – on wood.
120. Dactylospora inquilina Hafellner [Dactylosporaceae]
  1. Lendemer & Knapp (2007) - (5. Hickory Pt.) (on Pertusaria paratuberculifera)
121. Dermatocarpon luridum (With.) J.R. Laundon [Verrucariaceae]
  1. Syn.: Dermatocarpon fluviatile (G. Web.) Th. Fr.
  2. Skorepa et al. (1977) – Baltimore Co., on rocks.
  3. Skorepa et al. (1979) – on acidic rock.
  4. E.G. Worthley Herbarium - Carroll Co., in stream bed; Frederick Co., on boulder in stream.
  5. E.C. Uebel Herbarium – Baltimore Co., Hollofield, on moist rock.
122. Dermatocarpon miniatum (L.) W. Mann [Verrucariaceae]
  1. Skorepa et al. (1977) – Baltimore Co., on rock ledge.
  2. Skorepa et al. (1979) – on acidic rock, calcareous rock.
  3. E.G. Worthley Herbarium - Montgomery Co., Great Falls
123. Dibaeis baeomyces (L. f.) Rambold & Hertel [Icmadophilaceae]
  1. Syn.: Baeomyces roseus Pers.
  2. Skorepa et al. (1977) – Harford Co., on rock ledge.
  3. Skorepa et al. (1979) – on soil.
  4. Biechele (2002) – lower eastern shore of Maryland.
  5. E.G. Worthley Herbarium - Lichens of Soldiers Delight; Howard Co.
124. Dimelaena oreina (Ach.) Norman [Physciaceae]
  1. Skorepa et al. (1977) – Allegany Co., on sandstone outcrop.
  2. Skorepa et al. (1979) – on acidic rock.
125. Diploschistes scruposus (Schreber) Norman [Thelotremataceae]
  1. Skorepa et al. (1979) – on acidic rock.
126. Dirinaria frostii (Tuck.) Hale & Culb. [Physciaceae]
  1. Skorepa et al. (1977) – Allegany Co., on shale outcrops.
  2. Skorepa et al. (1979) – on acidic rock.
127. Endocarpon petrolepideum (Nyl.) Nyl. [Verrucariaceae]
  1. E.C. Uebel Herbarium – Prince George's Co., Greenbelt, on hill of concrete (identified by Dr. Othmar Breuss, Vienna, Austria, Mar 2005).
128. Endocarpon pusillum Hedwig [Verrucariaceae]
  1. Skorepa et al. (1977) – Washington Co., on chert.
  2. Skorepa et al. (1979) – on calcareous rock, cement.
129. Ephebe lanata (L.) Vainio [Lichinaceae]
  1. Skorepa et al. (1979) – on acidic rock.
130. Fissurina insidiosa Hook. & C. Knight [Graphidaceae]
  1. Lendemer & Knapp (2007) - (5. Hickory Pt.), (6. Pocomoke)
131. Flavoparmelia baltimorensis (Gyelnik & Fóriss) Hale [Parmeliaceae]
  1. Syn.: Parmelia baltimorensis Gyelnik & Fóriss
  2. Skorepa et al. (1977) – Baltimore Co., on rock outcrops.
  3. Skorepa et al. (1979) – on acidic rock.
  4. E.G. Worthley Herbarium - Harford Co., Rocks State Park, on acidic rock.
  5. E.C. Uebel Herbarium – Baltimore Co., Liberty Reservoir, on boulders.
132. Flavoparmelia caperata (L.) Hale [Parmeliaceae]
  1. Syn.: Parmelia caperata (L.) Ach.
  2. Skorepa et al. (1977) – Lichens of Soldiers Delight, on rocks.
  3. Skorepa et al. (1979) – on bark, acidic rock.
  4. Biechele (2002) – lower eastern shore of Maryland.
  5. E.G. Worthley Herbarium - Calvert Co.; Frederick Co.; Worcester Co., on bark.
  6. E.C. Uebel Herbarium – Prince George's Co., on fallen tree limbs.
  7. Lendemer & Knapp (2007) - (4. Sharptown)
133. Flavopunctelia flaventior (Stirton) Hale [Parmeliaceae]
  1. Syn.: Parmelia flaventior Stirt.
  2. Skorepa et al. (1977) – Garrett Co., on oak.
  3. Skorepa et al. (1979) – on bark.
  4. E.G. Worthley Herbarium - Allegany Co.; Garrett Co., Casselman Bridge State Park.
134. Flavopunctelia soredica (Nyl.) Hale [Parmeliaceae]
  1. Syn.: Parmelia ulophyllodes (Vaino) Savicz
  2. Skorepa et al. (1979) – on bark.
  3. E.G. Worthley Herbarium - Baltimore Co., Gunpowder State Park.
  4. E.C. Uebel Herbarium – Baltimore Co., Ridge Rd., on bark of Norway Maple.
135. Fuscopannaria leucophaea (Vahl) P.M. Jørg. [Pannariaceae]
  1. Syn.: Parmeliella microphylla (Sw.) Müll. Arg.
  2. Skorepa et al. (1979) – on acidic rock.
136. Fuscopannaria leucosticta (Tuck.) P.M. Jørg. [Pannariaceae]
  1. Syn.: Pannaria leucosticta (Tuck.) Tuck. ex Nyl.
  2. Skorepa et al. (1979) – on bark.
137. Gassicurtia vernicoma (Tuck.) Marbach [Physciaceae]
  1. Syn.: Buellia vernicoma (Tuck.) Tuck.
  2. Skorepa et al. (1977) – (collected by Plitt)
  3. Skorepa et al. (1979) – on bark.
138. Graphis scripta (L.) Ach. [Graphidaceae]
  1. Skorepa et al. (1977) – Montgomery Co., on oak.
  2. Skorepa et al. (1979) – on bark.
  3. E.G. Worthley Herbarium - Baltimore Co., Pretty Boy Reservoir; Wicomico Co.
  4. E.C. Uebel Herbarium – Carroll Co., Liberty Reservoir, on tree bark.
139. Hafellia disciformis (Fr.) Marbach & H. Mayrhofer [Physciaceae]
  1. Syn.: Buellia disciformis (Fr.) Mudd
  2. Skorepa et al. (1977) – Anne Arundel Co.
  3. Skorepa et al. (1979) – on bark.
140. Hertelidea botryosa (Fr.) Printzen & Kantvilas [Stereocaulaceae]
  1. Syn.: Lecidea botryosa (Fr.) Th. Fr.
  2. Skorepa et al. (1979) – on wood.
141. Heterodermia albicans (Pers.) Swinscow & Krog [Physciaceae]
  1. Syn.: Heterodermia domingensis (Ach.) Trev.
  2. Skorepa et al. (1977) – Wicomico Co., on tree trunks.
  3. Skorepa et al. (1979) – on bark.
142. Heterodermia appalachensis (Kurok.) Culb. [Physciaceae]
  1. Skorepa et al. (1977) – Baltimore Co., on trunk of oak.
143. Heterodermia granulifera (Ach.) Culb. [Physciaceae]
  1. Skorepa et al. (1977) – Montgomery Co., on trunk of Walnut tree.
  2. Skorepa et al. (1979) – on bark.
144. Heterodermia hypoleuca (Muhl.) Trevisan [Physciaceae]
  1. Skorepa et al. (1977) – Frederick Co, on oak.
  2. Skorepa et al. (1979) – on bark.
  3. Biechele (2002) – lower eastern shore of Maryland.
145. Heterodermia obscurata (Nyl.) Trevisan [Physciaceae]
  1. Skorepa et al. (1977) – Charles Co., on trunks of deciduous trees.
  2. Skorepa et al. (1979) – on bark, acidic rock.
  3. E.G. Worthley Herbarium - Baltimore Co., Gunpowder Falls, on tree trunk.
  4. Lendemer & Knapp (2007) - (2. Idylwild), (4. Sharptown)
146. Heterodermia speciosa (Wulfen) Trevisan [Physciaceae]
  1. Syn.: Heterodermia tremulans (Müll. Arg.) W. Culb.
  2. Skorepa et al. (1977) – Washington Co., on trunks of deciduous trees.
  3. Skorepa et al. (1979) – on bark, acidic rock.
  4. E.G. Worthley Herbarium - Baltimore Co., Pretty Boy Dam.
  5. Lendemer & Knapp (2007) - (2. Idylwild), (6. Pocomoke)
147. Hymenelia epulotica (Ach.) Lutzoni [Hymeneliaceae]
  1. Syn.: Ionaspis epulotica (Ach.) Blomb. & Forssell
  2. Skorepa et al. (1979) – on acidic rock.
148. Hyperphyscia adglutinata (Flörke) H. Mayrh. [Physciaceae]
  1. Syn.: Physciopsis adglutinata (Flörke) M. Choisy
  2. Skorepa et al. (1979) – on bark.
149. Hyperphyscia syncolla (Tuck. ex Nyl.) Kalb [Physciaceae]
  1. Syns.: Physcia syncolla Tuck. ex Nyl., Physciopsis syncolla (Tuck. ex Nyl.) Poelt
  2. Skorepa et al. (1977) – Wicomico Co., on oak trees.
  3. Skorepa et al. (1979) – on bark.
  4. Biechele (2002) – lower eastern shore of Maryland.
150. Hypocenomyce scalaris (Ach.) M. Choisy [Lecideaceae]
  1. Syn.: Lecidea scalaris (Ach. ex Lilj.) Ach.
  2. Skorepa et al. (1979) – on bark, wood.
  3. E.G. Worthley Herbarium - Lichens of Soldiers Delight, on trunk of pine.
151. Hypogymnia krogiae Ohlsson [Parmeliaceae]
  1. Skorepa et al. (1977) – Garrett Co., on conifer bark.
  2. Skorepa et al. (1979) – on bark.
152. Hypogymnia physodes (L.) Nyl. [Parmeliaceae]
  1. Skorepa et al. (1977) – Garrett Co., on tree trunks.
  2. Skorepa et al. (1979) – on bark, acidic rock.
  3. E.C. Uebel Herbarium – Baltimore Co., on bark of Norway Maple.
153. Hypotrachyna livida (Taylor) Hale [Parmeliaceae]
  1. Syn.: Parmelia livida Taylor
  2. Skorepa et al. (1977) – Sommerset Co., on branches of deciduous trees.
  3. Skorepa et al. (1979) – on bark.
  4. Biechele (2002) – lower eastern shore of Maryland.
  5. E.G. Worthley Herbarium - Wicomico Co.; Worcester Co., Milburn Landing, on branches.
  6. Lendemer & Knapp (2007) - (2. Idylwild), (4. Sharptown), (6. Pocomoke)
154. Hypotrachyna osseoalba (Vainio) Park & Hale [Parmeliaceae]
  1. Syn.: Parmelia formosana Zahlbr.
  2. Skorepa et al. (1977) – Dorchester Co., on oak trunk.
  3. Skorepa et al. (1979) – on bark.
  4. Lendemer & Knapp (2007) - (4. Sharptown)
155. Imshaugia aleurites (Ach.) S.F. Meyer [Parmeliaceae]
  1. Syn.: Parmeliopsis aleurites (Ach.) Nyl.
  2. Skorepa et al. (1977) – Garrett Co., on oak trunk.
  3. Skorepa et al. (1979) – on bark, acidic rock, wood.
  4. E.G. Worthley Herbarium - Lichens of Soldiers Delight, on Virginia pines.
  5. E.C. Uebel Herbarium – Lichens of Soldiers Delight, on trunks of pines.
156. Imshaugia placorodia (Ach.) S.F. Meyer [Parmeliaceae]
  1. Syn.: Parmeliopsis placorodia (Ach.) Nyl.
  2. Skorepa et al. (1977) – Harford Co., on pine trees.
  3. Skorepa et al. (1979) – on bark.
  4. E.G. Worthley Herbarium - Lichens of Soldiers Delight, on pine branches.
  5. E.C. Uebel Herbarium – Lichens of Soldiers Delight, on branches of Virginia pines.
157. Julella fallaciosa (Arnold) R.C. Harris (Not lichenized.) [Thelenellaceae]
  1. E.C. Uebel Herbarium – Baltimore Co., Liberty Reservoir, on bark of Tulip Tree.
158. Lasallia papulosa (Ach.) Llano [Umbilicariaceae]
  1. Syn.: Umbilicaria papulosa (Ach.) Nyl.
  2. Skorepa et al. (1977) – Baltimore Co., on rocks on hillside.
  3. Skorepa et al. (1979) – on bark, acidic rock.
  4. E.G. Worthley Herbarium - Frederick Co., Cunningham Falls; Montgomery Co., Great Falls.
159. Lasallia pensylvanica (Hoffm.) Llano [Umbilicariaceae]
  1. Syn.: Umbilicaria pensylvanica Hoffm.
  2. Skorepa et al. (1977) – Harford Co., on rock outcrops.
  3. Skorepa et al. (1979) – on acidic rock.
  4. E.G. Worthley Herbarium - Washington Co., Wash. Monument State Park, on rocks.
160. Lasallia pustulata (L.) Mérat [Umbilicariaceae]
  1. E.G. Worthley Herbarium - Frederick Co., South Mt.; Montgomery Co., Sugarloaf Mt., on boulders.
161. Lecanora albella (Pers.) Ach. var. albella [Lecanoraceae]
  1. E.G. Worthley Herbarium - Worcester Co., on bark of Pinus taeda.
162. Lecanora cadubriae (A. Massal.) Hedl. [Lecanoraceae]
  1. Skorepa et al. (1979) – on bark.
163. Lecanora caesiorubella Ach. subsp. caesiorubella [Lecanoraceae]
  1. Skorepa et al. (1977) – Harford Co., on trunk of oak.
  2. Skorepa et al. (1979) – on bark.
  3. E.G. Worthley Herbarium - Lichens of Soldiers Delight; Wicomico Co.
164. Lecanora campestris (Schaerer) Hue [Lecanoraceae]
  1. Skorepa et al. (1977) – Allegany Co., on shale outcrop.
  2. Skorepa et al. (1979) – on acidic rock.
165. Lecanora chlarotera Nyl. [Lecanoraceae]
  1. Skorepa et al. (1977) – Calvert Co., on trunks of deciduous trees.
  2. Skorepa et al. (1979) – on bark.
  3. Biechele (2002) – lower eastern shore of Maryland.
166. Lecanora cinereofusca H. Magn. [Lecanoraceae]
  1. Lendemer & Knapp (2007) - (2. Idylwild), (5. Hickory Pt.), (6. Pocomoke)
167. Lecanora dispersa (Pers.) Sommerf. [Lecanoraceae]
  1. Skorepa et al. (1977) – Washington Co., on stone wall.
  2. Skorepa et al. (1979) – on calcareous rock, cement, other.
  3. E.G. Worthley Herbarium - Baltimore Co.; Washington Co., on rock outcrops.
168. Lecanora expallens Ach. [Lecanoraceae]
  1. Syn.: Lecanora conizea (Ach.) Nyl.
  2. Skorepa et al. (1977) – St. Mary's Co., on trunks of Black Locust.
  3. Skorepa et al. (1979) – on bark, wood.
  4. E.G. Worthley Herbarium - Lichens of Soldiers Delight; St. Mary' Co., on trunk of Black Locust.
169. Lecanora hagenii (Ach.) Ach. [Lecanoraceae]
  1. Skorepa et al. (1977) – Frederick Co., on old timbers.
  2. Skorepa et al. (1979) – on wood.
170. Lecanora hybocarpa (Tuck.) Brodo [Lecanoraceae]
  1. Biechele (2002) – lower eastern shore of Maryland.
  2. Lendemer & Knapp (2007) - (1. Millington), (4. Sharptown), (5. Hickory Pt.), (6. Pocomoke)
171. Lecanora imshaugii Brodo [Lecanoraceae]
  1. Biechele (2002) – lower eastern shore of Maryland.
172. Lecanora minutella Nyl. [Lecanoraceae]
  1. Lendemer & Knapp (2007) - (2. Idylwild)
173. Lecanora muralis (Schreber) Rabenh. [Lecanoraceae]
  1. Skorepa et al. (1977) – Montgomery Co., on rock ledges.
174. Lecanora muralis var. versicolor (Pers.) Tuck. [Lecanoraceae]
  1. Syn.: Lecanora versicolor (Pers.) Ach.
  2. Skorepa et al. (1977) – Washington Co., on stone wall.
  3. Skorepa et al. (1979) – on acidic rock.
  4. Skorepa et al. (1979) – on acidic rock, calcareous rock.
  5. E.G. Worthley Herbarium - Washington Co., C & 0 canal, on shale.
175. Lecanora polytropa (Hoffm.) Rabenh. [Lecanoraceae]
  1. Skorepa et al. (1979) – on acidic rock.
176. Lecanora pulicaris (Pers.) Ach. [Lecanoraceae]
  1. Syn.: Lecanora coilocarpa (Ach.) Nyl.
  2. Skorepa et al. (1977) – Calvert Co., on deciduous trees.
  3. Skorepa et al. (1979) – on bark.
  4. E.C. Uebel Herbarium – Baltimore Co., on bark of Norway Maple.
177. Lecanora strobilina (Spreng.) Kieffer [Lecanoraceae]
  1. Biechele (2002) – lower eastern shore of Maryland.
  2. E.C. Uebel Herbarium – Baltimore Co., on bark of Norway Maple; Prince George's Co., on bark of pines.
  3. Lendemer & Knapp (2007) - (2. Idylwild)
178. Lecanora subpallens Zahlbr. - [Lecanoraceae]
  1. Lendemer & Knapp (2007) - (1. Millington), (2. Idylwild), (4. Sharptown)
179. Lecanora thysanophora R.C. Harris [Lecanoraceae]
  1. Thomas E. Wilson, III (4 Dec 2006) – IMG_9960.JPG, photographed on tree trunk in woodland on eastern side of Baltimore County, MD.
  2. Lendemer & Knapp (2007) - (1. Millington), (5. Hickory Pt.)
180. Lecanora xylophila Hue [Lecanoraceae]
  1. Syn.: Lecanora laevis Poelt (N.A. records are L. xylophila)
  2. Skorepa et al. (1977) – Baltimore Co., on wave-washed timbers.
  3. Skorepa et al. (1979) – on wood.
181. Lecidea cyrtidia Tuck. [Lecideaceae]
  1. Skorepa et al. (1977) – Washington Co., on rocks.
  2. Skorepa et al. (1979) – on acidic rock.
182. Lecidea plebeja Nyl. [Lecideaceae]
  1. Syn.: Lecidea myriocarpoides Nyl.
  2. Skorepa et al. (1979) – on wood.
  3. Lendemer & Knapp (2007) - (2. Idylwild)
183. Lecidella stigmatea (Ach.) Hertel & Leuckert [Lecanoraceae]
  1. Syn.: Lecidea stigmatea Ach.
  2. Skorepa et al. (1979) – on acidic rock.
184. Lepraria caesiella R.C. Harris [Family Not Determined]
  1. Lendemer & Knapp (2007) - (2. Idylwild), (4. Sharptown)
185. Lepraria aff. incana (L.) Ach. [Family Not Determined]
  1. Lendemer & Knapp (2007) - (1. Millington), (2. Idylwild)
186. Lepraria lobificans Nyl. [Family Not Determined]
  1. Syn.: Lepraria finkii (B. de Lesd.) R.C. Harris
  2. E.G. Worthley Herbarium - Baltimore Co., Gunpowder River Area, on Quercus alba.
  3. E.C. Uebel Herbarium – Carroll Co., Liberty Reservoir, rock near water.
  4. Lendemer & Knapp (2007) - (2. Idylwild), (3. Chesapeake)
187. Lepraria membranacea (Dickson) Vainio [Family Not Determined]
  1. Syn.: Leproloma membranaceum (Dickson) Vainio
  2. E.G. Worthley Herbarium - Frederick Co., Cunningham Falls.
188. Lepraria neglecta (Nyl.) Erichsen [Family Not Determined]
  1. Syn.: Lepraria zonata Brodo = L.caesioalba or L. neglecta.
  2. Skorepa et al. (1977) – Baltimore Co., on acid rocks.
  3. Skorepa et al. (1979) – on bark, acidic rock.
  4. E.G. Worthley Herbarium - Frederick Co., Cunningham Falls; Montgomery Co., Great Falls.
189. Leptogium azureum (Sw.) Mont. [Collemataceae]
  1. Skorepa et al. (1977) – Montgomery Co., Plummers Is. (collected by Fink).
  2. Skorepa et al. (1979) – on acidic rock.
190. Leptogium cyanescens (Rabenh.) Körber [Collemataceae]
  1. Skorepa et al. (1977) – Worcester Co., on trunks of deciduous trees.
  2. Skorepa et al. (1979) – on bark, acidic rock.
  3. Biechele (2002) – lower eastern shore of Maryland.
  4. E.G. Worthley Herbarium - Baltimore Co., Gunpowder River, on vertical rocks; Frederick Co., Cunningham Falls.
  5. Lendemer & Knapp (2007) - (5. Hickory Pt.), (6. Pocomoke)
191. Leptogium lichenoides (L.) Zahlbr. [Collemataceae]
  1. Skorepa et al. (1977) – Allegany Co., on bark of deciduous trees.
  2. Skorepa et al. (1979) – on bark, acidic rock.
192. Leptogium phyllocarpum (Pers.) Mont. [Collemataceae]
  1. Biechele (2002) – lower eastern shore of Maryland.
193. Leptogium subtile (Schrader) Torss. [Collemataceae]
  1. Syn.: Leptogium minutissimum (Flörke) Fr.
  2. Skorepa et al. (1977) – Montgomery Co., on rock ledge.
  3. Skorepa et al. (1979) – on acidic rock.
194. Lichenoconium erodens M.S. Christ. & D. Hawksw. [Anamorphic Ascomycetes]
  1. Lendemer & Knapp (2007) - (5. Hickory Pt.) (on Lecanora cinereofusca)
195. Lichenodiplis lecanorae (Vouaux) Dyko & D. Hawksw. [Anamorphic Ascomycetes]
  1. E.C. Uebel Herbarium – Baltimore Co., Liberty Reservoir, a specimen of Pertusaria xanthodes U-243, was collected growing on a small dead oak branch. This crustose lichen contained a lichenicolous fungus and a sample of this fungus was sent to the Farlow Herbarium where it was forwarded to Dr. David Hawksworth, who identified it as Lichenodiplis lecanorae.
196. Lobaria pulmonaria (L.) Hoffm. [Lobariaceae]
  1. Skorepa et al. (1979) – on bark.
  2. Biechele (2002) – lower eastern shore of Maryland.
  3. E.G. Worthley Herbarium - Frederick Co., Cunningham Falls.
197. Lobaria quercizans Michaux [Lobariaceae]
  1. Skorepa et al. (1977) – Garrett Co., on trunk of deciduous tree.
  2. Skorepa et al. (1979) – on bark.
  3. Biechele (2002) – lower eastern shore of Maryland.
  4. E.G. Worthley Herbarium - Frederick Co., Cunningham Falls.
  5. Lendemer & Knapp (2007) - (5. Hickory Pt.)
198. Loxospora pustulata (Brodo & Culb.) R.C. Harris [Loxosporaceae]
  1. Lendemer & Knapp (2007) - (2. Idylwild), (4. Sharptown)
199. Melanelia culbersonii (Hale) Thell [Parmeliaceae]
  1. Syn.: Cetraria culbersonii Hale
  2. Skorepa et al. (1977) – Allegany Co., on exposed rock.
  3. Skorepa et al. (1979) – on acidic rock.
  4. E.G. Worthley Herbarium - Allegany Co., Dans Rock Overlook.
200. Melanelixia subaurifera (Nyl.) O. Blanco et al. [Parmeliaceae]
  1. Syns.: Parmelia subaurifera Nyl., Melanelia subaurifera (Nyl.) Essl.
  2. Skorepa et al. (1977) – Allegany Co., on deciduous trees.
  3. Skorepa et al. (1979) – on bark.
  4. E.C. Uebel Herbarium – Baltimore Co., on bark of Norway Maple.
201. Melanohalea exasperata (De Not.) O. Blanco et al.. [Parmeliaceae]
  1. Syns.: Parmelia exasperata De Not., Melanelia exasperata (De Not.) Essl.
  2. Skorepa et al. (1979) – on bark.
  3. E.G. Worthley Herbarium - Baltimore Co., Owings Mills.
202. Metamelanea melambola (Tuck.) Henssen [Lichinaceae]
  1. Syn.Pyrenopsis melambola (Tuck.) Tuck.
  2. Skorepa et al. (1979) – on calcareous rock.
203. Micarea erratica (Körber) Hertel, Rambold & Pietschmann [Micareaceae]
  1. Syn.: Lecidea erratica Körber
  2. Skorepa et al. (1977) – Baltimore Co., on pebbles.
  3. Skorepa et al. (1979) – on acidic rock.
  4. E.G. Worthley Herbarium - Garrett Co., Carey Run, in open field.
  5. Lendemer & Knapp (2007) - (2. Idylwild)
204. Minutoexcipula mariana V. Atienza* (on Pertusaria) [Family Not Determined]
  1. Lendemer & Knapp (2007) - (4. Sharptown)
205. Mycobilimbia berengeriana (A. Massal.) Hafellner & V. Wirth [Porpidiaceae]
  1. Syn.: Lecidea berengeriana (Massal.) Nyl.
  2. Skorepa et al. (1977) – Frederick Co., on oak trunks.
  3. Skorepa et al. (1979) – on bark.
  4. E.G. Worthley Herbarium - Montgomery Co., Great Falls, on old wood.
206. Myelochroa aurulenta (Tuck.) Elix & Hale [Parmeliaceae]
  1. Syns: Parmelia aurulenta Tuck.
  2. Skorepa et al. (1977) – Baltimore Co., on rocks.
  3. Skorepa et al. (1979) – on bark, acidic rock.
  4. E.G. Worthley Herbarium - Baltimore Co., along Gunpowder River, on rock outcrops.
  5. E.C. Uebel Herbarium – Baltimore County, Liberty Reservoir; Prince George's Co., on bark.
  6. Lendemer & Knapp (2007) - (5. Hickory Pt.), (6. Pocomoke)
207. Myelochroa galbina (Ach.) Elix & Hale [Parmeliaceae]
  1. Syn.: Parmelia galbina Ach.
  2. Skorepa et al. (1977) – Allegany Co., on trunks of deciduous trees.
  3. Skorepa et al. (1979) – on bark.
  4. E.G. Worthley Herbarium - Allegany Co., along Terrapin Run, on trunks of deciduous trees.
  5. E.C. Uebel Herbarium – Lichens of Soldiers Delight.
208. Myelochroa metarevoluta (Asah.) Elix & Hale [Parmeliaceae]
  1. Syn.: Parmelia metarevoluta (Asahina) Hale
  2. Skorepa et al. (1977) – Montgomery Co., on oak trunk.
  3. Skorepa et al. (1979) – on bark.
209. Myelochroa obsessa (Ach.) Elix & Hale [Parmeliaceae]
  1. Syn.: Parmelia obsessa Ach.
  2. Skorepa et al. (1977) – Baltimore Co., on acid rocks.
  3. Skorepa et al. (1979) – on bark, acidic rock.
  4. E.G. Worthley Herbarium - Baltimore Co., near Little Gunpowder River, on rock ledges.
210. Nadvornikia sorediata R.C. Harris [Thelotremataceae]
  1. Lendemer & Knapp (2007) - (1. Millington), (5. Hickory Pt.), (6. Pocomoke)
211. Nephroma helveticum Ach. subsp. helveticum [Nephromataceae]
  1. Skorepa et al. (1977) – Montgomery Co., Plummers Is. (collected by Fink).
  2. Skorepa et al. (1979) – on acidic rock.
212. Normandina pulchella (Borrer) Nyl. [Verrucariaceae]
  1. Skorepa et al. (1979) – on bark.
213. Ochrolechia androgyna (Hoffm.) Arnold [Pertusariaceae]
  1. Skorepa et al. (1977) – Anne Arundel Co.
  2. Skorepa et al. (1979) – on acidic rock.
214. Ochrolechia cinera Chev. [Pertusariaceae]
  1. Biechele (2002) – lower eastern shore of Maryland.
215. Ochrolechia pseudopallescens Brodo [Pertusariaceae]
  1. Lendemer & Knapp (2007) - (5. Hickory Pt.)
216. Ochrolechia trochophora var. trochophora (Vainio) Oshio [Pertusariaceae]
  1. Syn.: Ochrolechia rosella (Müll. Arg.) Vers.
  2. Biechele (2002) – lower eastern shore of Maryland.
217. Ochrolechia yasudae Vainio [Pertusariaceae]
  1. Skorepa et al. (1977) – Frederick Co. (collected by Plitt).
  2. Skorepa et al. (1979) – on acidic rock.
218. Opegrapha varia Pers. [Roccellaceae]
  1. Lendemer & Knapp (2007) - (6. Pocomoke)
219. Opegrapha viridis Pers. [Roccellaceae]
  1. Lendemer & Knapp (2007) - (5. Hickory Pt.)
220. Opegrapha vulgata Ach. [Roccellaceae]
  1. Lendemer & Knapp (2007) - (2. Idylwild), (3. Chesapeake), (4. Sharptown)
221. Pannaria conoplea (Ach.) Bory [Pannariaceae]
  1. Syn.: Pannaria pityrea auct.
  2. Skorepa et al. (1979) – on bark.
222. Pannaria lurida (Mont.) Nyl. [Pannariaceae]
  1. Skorepa et al. (1979) – on bark.
  2. Biechele (2002) – lower eastern shore of Maryland.
223. Parmelia saxatilis (L.) Ach. [Parmeliaceae]
  1. Skorepa et al. (1977) – Frederick Co., in mature oak woods.
  2. Skorepa et al. (1979) – on bark, acidic rock.
  3. E.G. Worthley Herbarium - Baltimore Co., along Gunpowder River, on bark of Quercus velutina.
224. Parmelia squarrosa Hale [Parmeliaceae]
  1. Skorepa et al. (1977) – Garrett Co., on Acer.
  2. Skorepa et al. (1979) – on bark.
  3. Lendemer & Knapp (2007) - (6. Pocomoke)
225. Parmelia sulcata Taylor [Parmeliaceae]
  1. Skorepa et al. (1977) – Washington Co., on deciduous trees.
  2. Skorepa et al. (1979) – on bark, acidic rock.
  3. E.G. Worthley Herbarium - Lichens of Soldiers Delight; Carroll Co., on bark of Fraxinus americana.
  4. E.C. Uebel Herbarium – Baltimore Co., on bark of Norway Maple.
226. Parmelinopsis horrescens (Taylor) Elix & Hale [Parmeliaceae]
  1. Syn.: Parmelia horrescens Taylor
  2. Skorepa et al. (1977) – Calvert Co., on trunks of pines.
  3. Skorepa et al. (1979) – on bark.
  4. E.G. Worthley Herbarium - Worcester Co., Milburn Landing, on bark of Pinus taeda.
  5. Lendemer & Knapp (2007) - (2. Idylwild), (4. Sharptown), (6. Pocomoke)
227. Parmelinopsis minarum (Vainio) Elix & Hale [Parmeliaceae]
  1. Syn.: Parmelia dissecta Nyl.
  2. Skorepa et al. (1977) – Frederick Co., on oak trunk.
  3. Skorepa et al. (1979) – on bark, acidic rock.
  4. E.G. Worthley Herbarium - Lichens of Soldiers Delight.
  5. Lendemer & Knapp (2007) - (2. Idylwild), (5. Hickory Pt.)
228. Parmeliopsis ambigua (Wulfen) Nyl. [Parmeliaceae]
  1. Skorepa et al. (1977) – Garrett Co., on trunk of deciduous tree.
  2. Skorepa et al. (1979) – on bark.
  3. E.G. Worthley Herbarium - Worcester Co., Milburn Landing, on bark of Pinus taeda.
229. Parmeliopsis hyperopta (Ach.) Arnold [Parmeliaceae]
  1. Syn.: Parmeliopsis diffusa (Weber) Riddle
  2. E.G. Worthley Herbarium - Baltimore Co., Owings Mills.
230. Parmeliopsis subambigua Gyelnik [Parmeliaceae]
  1. Syn.: Parmeliopsis halei (Tuck.) Hale
  2. Skorepa et al. (1977) – Worcester Co., on pine trunks.
  3. Skorepa et al. (1979) – on bark.
  4. Lendemer & Knapp (2007) - (4. Sharptown), (6. Pocomoke)
231. Parmotrema cetratum (Ach.) Hale [Parmeliaceae]
  1. Syns.: Parmelia cetrata Ach, Rimelia cetrata (Ach.) Hale & Fletcher
  2. Skorepa et al. (1977) – Worcester Co., on trunk of Sweet gum.
  3. Skorepa et al. (1979) – on bark.
232. Parmotrema chinense (Osbeck) Hale & Ahti [Parmeliaceae]
  1. Syn.: Parmotrema perlatum (Huds.) Choisy
  2. E.C. Uebel Herbarium – Baltimore Co., on bark of Norway Maple, on oak limb.
233. Parmotrema crinitum (Ach.) M. Choisy [Parmeliaceae]
  1. Syn.: Parmelia crinita Ach.
  2. Skorepa et al. (1977) – Worcester Co., on trunk of pine.
  3. Skorepa et al. (1979) – on bark.
  4. E.G. Worthley Herbarium - Baltimore Co., Owings Mills, on trees.
234. Parmotrema dilatatum (Vainio) Hale [Parmeliaceae]
  1. Syn.: Parmelia dilatata Vainio
  2. Skorepa et al. (1977) – Dorchester Co., on trunks of deciduous trees.
  3. Skorepa et al. (1979) – on bark.
235. Parmotrema eurysacum (Hue) Hale [Parmeliaceae]
  1. Syn.: Parmelia eurysaca Hue
  2. Skorepa et al. (1977) – Baltimore Co. (collected by Plitt).
  3. Skorepa et al. (1979) – on bark.
236. Parmotrema gardneri (Dodge) Serux. [Parmeliaceae]
  1. Biechele (2002) – lower eastern shore of Maryland.
237. Parmotrema hypoleucinum (B. Stein) Hale [Parmeliaceae]
  1. Biechele (2002) – lower eastern shore of Maryland.
238. Parmotrema hypoleucinum (J. Steiner) Hale [Parmeliaceae]
  1. Lendemer & Knapp (2007) - (4. Sharptown), (6. Pocomoke)
239. Parmotrema hypotropum (Nyl.) Hale [Parmeliaceae]
  1. Syn.: Parmelia hypotropa Nyl.
  2. Skorepa et al. (1977) – Kent Co., on trees.
  3. Skorepa et al. (1979) – on bark.
  4. Biechele (2002) – lower eastern shore of Maryland.
  5. E.G. Worthley Herbarium - Kent Co., on trees; Somerset Co., on deciduous trees; Wicomico Co.; Worcester Co., on bark of Pinus taeda.
  6. E.C. Uebel Herbarium – Baltimore Co.; Prince George's Co., on bark and boulder.
  7. Lendemer & Knapp (2007) - (1. Millington), (2. Idylwild), (4. Sharptown), (6. Pocomoke)
240. Parmotrema margaritatum (Hue) Hale [Parmeliaceae]
  1. Syn.: Parmelia margaritata Hue
  2. Skorepa et al. (1979) – on bark.
241. Parmotrema perforatum (Jacq.) A. Massal. [Parmeliaceae]
  1. Syn.: Parmelia perforata (Jacq.) Ach.
  2. Skorepa et al. (1977) – Charles Co., on deciduous trees.
  3. Skorepa et al. (1979) – on bark.
  4. Biechele (2002) – lower eastern shore of Maryland.
  5. E.G. Worthley Herbarium - Prince George's Co., on bark of oak; Worcester Co., Milburn Landing.
  6. Lendemer & Knapp (2007) - (5. Hickory Pt.)
242. Parmotrema reticulatum (Taylor) M. Choisy [Parmeliaceae]
  1. Syns.: Parmelia reticulata Taylor, Rimelia reticulata (Taylor) Hale & Fletcher
  2. Skorepa et al. (1977) – Charles Co., on deciduous trees.
  3. Skorepa et al. (1979) – on bark.
  4. Biechele (2002) – lower eastern shore of Maryland.
  5. E.G. Worthley Herbarium - Lichens of Soldiers Delight; Worcester Co., on bark of Taxodium and Acer rubrum.
  6. E.C. Uebel Herbarium – Lichens of Soldiers Delight.
243. Parmotrema stuppeum (Taylor) Hale [Parmeliaceae]
  1. Syn.: Parmelia stuppea Taylor
  2. Skorepa et al. (1977) – Garrett Co., on trunk of oak.
  3. Skorepa et al. (1979) – on bark.
  4. E.C. Uebel Herbarium – Baltimore Co., on bark of Norway Maple.
244. Parmotrema subisidiosum (Müll. Arg.) Hale
  1. Biechele (2002) – lower eastern shore of Maryland.
  2. Lendemer & Knapp (2007) - (2. Idylwild), (5. Hickory Pt.), (6. Pocomoke)
245. Parmotrema submarginale (Michx.) DePriest & Hale [Parmeliaceae]
  1. Syn.: Parmelia michauxiana Zahlbr.
  2. Skorepa et al. (1977) – Charles Co., on deciduous trees.
  3. Skorepa et al. (1979) – on bark.
  4. E.G. Worthley Herbarium - Calvert Co., Battle Creek Cypress Swamp, on bark; Worcester Co., Milburn Landing, on deciduous trees.
  5. Lendemer & Knapp (2007) - (4. Sharptown), (5. Hickory Pt.), (6. Pocomoke)
246. Parmotrema subtinctorium (Zahlbr.) Hale [Parmeliaceae]
  1. Syn.: Parmelia subcrinita Nyl.
  2. Skorepa et al. (1977) – Somerset Co., on deciduous trees.
  3. Skorepa et al. (1979) – on bark.
247. Parmotrema xanthinum (Müll. Arg.) Hale [Parmeliaceae]
  1. Syn.: Parmelia xanthina (Müll. Arg.) Vainio
  2. Skorepa et al. (1979) – on bark.
  3. Biechele (2002) – lower eastern shore of Maryland.
  4. Lendemer & Knapp (2007) - (6. Pocomoke)
248. Peltigera aphthosa (L.) Willd. [Peltigeraceae]
  1. Skorepa et al. (1977) – No County, (Thomson, 1940).
249. Peltigera canina (L.) Willd. [Peltigeraceae]
  1. Skorepa et al. (1977) – Garrett Co., with moss on sandstone.
  2. E.G. Worthley Herbarium - Garrett Co., Casselman Bridge State Park, on sandstone rocks; Wicomico Co., on sandy soil.
250. Peltigera didactyla (With.) J. R. Laundon [Peltigeraceae]
  1. Syn.: Peltigera spuria (Ach.) DC.
  2. Skorepa et al. (1977) – Washington Co., on rock in seepage area.
251. Peltigera elisabethae Gyelnik [Peltigeraceae]
  1. Skorepa et al. (1977) – Baltimore Co., with moss on wet rocks.
252. Peltigera evansiana Gyelnik [Peltigeraceae]
  1. Skorepa et al. (1977) – Baltimore Co., (collected by Plitt).
253. Peltigera horizontalis (Hudson) Baumg. [Peltigeraceae]
  1. Skorepa et al. (1977) – Baltimore Co., (collected by Merrill 1906).
254. Peltigera neckeri Müll. Arg. [Peltigeraceae]
  1. Biechele (2002) – lower eastern shore of Maryland.
255. Peltigera polydactylon (Necker) Hoffm. [Peltigeraceae]
  1. Skorepa et al. (1977) – Garrett Co., on moss covered rocks.
256. Peltigera praetextata (Flörke ex Sommerf.) Zopf [Peltigeraceae]
  1. Skorepa et al. (1977) – Dorchester Co., at base of tree.
  2. Biechele (2002) – lower eastern shore of Maryland.
  3. Lendemer & Knapp (2007) - (3. Chesapeake)
257. Peltigera rufescens (Weiss) Humb. [Peltigeraceae]
  1. Biechele (2002) – lower eastern shore of Maryland.
258. Peltula euploca (Ach.) Poelt [Peltulaceae]
  1. Skorepa et al. (1979) – on soil.
259. Pertusaria amara (Ach.) Nyl. [Pertusariaceae]
  1. Skorepa et al. (1979) – on bark.
260. Pertusaria epixantha R.C. Harris [Pertusariaceae]
  1. Lendemer & Knapp (2007) - (5. Hickory Pt.)
261. Pertusaria globularis (Ach.) Tuck. [Pertusariaceae]
  1. Skorepa et al. (1979) – on other.
262. Pertusaria hypothamnolica Dibben [Pertusariaceae]
  1. Skorepa et al. (1979) – on bark.
263. Pertusaria macounii (Lamb) Dibben [Pertusariaceae]
  1. Skorepa et al. (1979) – on bark.
264. Pertusaria multipunctoides Dibben [Pertusariaceae]
  1. Skorepa et al. (1979) – on bark.
  2. Biechele (2002) – lower eastern shore of Maryland.
  3. E.C. Uebel Herbarium – Baltimore Co., Liberty Reservoir, on trunk of Carya.
  4. Lendemer & Knapp (2007) - (5. Hickory Pt.)
265. Pertusaria ophthalmiza (Nyl.) Nyl. [Pertusariaceae]
  1. Biechele (2002) – lower eastern shore of Maryland.
  2. Lendemer & Knapp (2007) - (5. Hickory Pt.)
266. Pertusaria paratuberculifera Dibben [Pertusariaceae]
  1. Pertusaria tuberculifera Nyl is misidentification for N.A., most specimens are P. paratuberculifera.
  2. Skorepa et al. (1977) – Frederick Co., on oak trunks.
  3. Skorepa et al. (1979) – on bark.
  4. Lendemer & Knapp (2007) - (1. Millington), (2. Idylwild), (5. Hickory Pt.), (6. Pocomoke)
267. Pertusaria plittiana Erichsen [Pertusariaceae]
  1. Skorepa et al. (1979) – on acidic rock.
268. Pertusaria propinqua Müll. Arg. [Pertusariaceae]
  1. Skorepa et al. (1979) – on bark.
  2. Lendemer & Knapp (2007) - (6. Pocomoke)
269. Pertusaria pustulata (Ach.) Duby [Pertusariaceae]
  1. Skorepa et al. (1979) – on bark.
  2. E.C. Uebel Herbarium – Prince George's Co., on dead limb of deciduous tree.
  3. Lendemer & Knapp (2007) - (1. Millington)
270. Pertusaria rubefacta Erichsen [Pertusariaceae]
  1. Skorepa et al. (1979) – on bark.
271. Pertusaria subpertusa Brodo [Pertusariaceae]
  1. Skorepa et al. (1979) – on bark.
  2. Lendemer & Knapp (2007) - (2. Idylwild), (6. Pocomoke)
272. Pertusaria tetrathalamia (Fée) Nyl. [Pertusariaceae]
  1. Skorepa et al. (1979) – on bark.
273. Pertusaria texana Müll. Arg. [Pertusariaceae]
  1. Skorepa et al. (1979) – on bark.
  2. Lendemer & Knapp (2007) - (2. Idylwild)
274. Pertusaria trachythallina Erichsen [Pertusariaceae]
  1. Skorepa et al. (1979) – on bark.
275. Pertusaria velata (Turner) Nyl. [Pertusariaceae]
  1. Skorepa et al. (1977) – Frederick Co., in oak woods.
  2. Skorepa et al. (1979) – on bark.
  3. Lendemer & Knapp (2007) - (2. Idylwild), (5. Hickory Pt.), (6. Pocomoke)
276. Pertusaria waghornei Hulting [Pertusariaceae]
  1. Skorepa et al. (1979) – on bark.
277. Pertusaria xanthodes Müll. Arg. [Pertusariaceae]
  1. Skorepa et al. (1977) – Harford Co., on tree bark.
  2. Skorepa et al. (1979) – on bark.
  3. E.G. Worthley Herbarium - Calvert Co.; Frederick Co.; Washington Co., on bark of Quercus velutina.
  4. E.C. Uebel Herbarium – Baltimore Co., Liberty Reservoir, on bark of dead oak branch.
278. Phaeocalicium curtisii (Tuck.) Tibell [Mycocaliciaceae]
  1. E.G. Worthley Herbarium - Baltimore Co., on twigs of Rhus glabra.
279. Phaeocalicium polyporaeum (Nyl.) Tibell [Mycocaliciaceae]
  1. E.C. Uebel Herbarium – a specimen of Violet Toothed Polypore [Trichaptum biforme (Fries) Ryvarden] was collected with Flavoparmelia caperata (U-65) growing on the bark of a fallen oak tree at Liberty Reservoir in Baltimore County. The T. biforme had a stubble lichen growing on it which was identified by Dr. Steven Selva as Phaeocalicium polyporaeum.
  2. Lendemer & Knapp (2007) - (2. Idylwild), (4. Sharptown), (6. Pocomoke)
280. Phaeographis inusta (Ach.) Müll. Arg. [Graphidaceae]
  1. Lendemer & Knapp (2007) - (2. Idylwild), (4. Sharptown)
281. Phaeophyscia adiastola (Essl.) Essl. [Physciaceae]
  1. Syns.: Physcia orbicularis (Necker) Poetsch; Phaeophyscia orbicularis (Necker) Moberg
  2. Skorepa et al. (1977) – Allegany Co., on oak trunk.
  3. Skorepa et al. (1979) – on bark, acidic rock, other.
  4. E.G. Worthley Herbarium – Worcester Co., on bark of Taxodium; Frederick Co., Cunningham Falls; Baltimore Co., Church of the Brethren.
282. Phaeophysica ciliata (Hoffm.) Moberg [Physciaceae]
  1. Syn.: Physcia ciliata (Hoffm.) Du Rietz
  2. Skorepa et al. (1977) – Caroline Co., on cement bridge.
  3. Skorepa et al. (1979) – on bark.
283. Phaeophyscia hirsuta (Mereschk.) Essl. [Physciaceae]
  1. Syns.: Physcia hirsuta Mereschk., Phaeophyscia cernohorskyi (Nádv.) Essl.
  2. Skorepa et al. (1979) – on cement.
284. Phaeophyscia hirtella Essl. [Physciaceae]
  1. Skorepa et al. (1979) – on bark.
285. Phaeophyscia hispidula (Ach.) Essl. [Physciaceae]
  1. Syn.: Phaeophyscia imbricata Vainio
  2. Skorepa et al. (1979) – on bark.
286. Phaeophyscia pusilloides (Zahlbr.) Essl. [Physciaceae]
  1. Syn.: Physcia pusilloides Zahlbr.
  2. Skorepa et al. (1977) – Frederick Co., on trees.
  3. Skorepa et al. (1979) – on bark.
  4. E.C. Uebel Herbarium – Lichens of Soldiers Delight; Baltimore Co., on bark of Norway Maple;
287. Phaeophyscia rubropulchra (Degel.) Essl. [Physciaceae]
  1. Syn.: Physcia orbicularis f. rubropulchra Degel.
  2. Skorepa et al. (1977) – Garrett Co., in upland woods.
  3. Skorepa et al. (1979) – on bark, acidic rock, other.
  4. Biechele (2002) – lower eastern shore of Maryland.
  5. E.C. Uebel Herbarium – Lichens of Soldiers Delight; Baltimore Co., Liberty Reservoir, on trunk of Tulip tree.
  6. Lendemer & Knapp (2007) - (1. Millington), (2. Idylwild)
288. Phlyctis ludoviciensis (Müll. Arg.) Lendemer [Phlyctidaceae]
  1. Lendemer & Knapp (2007) - (5. Hickory Pt.)
289. Physcia adscendens (Fr.) H. Olivier [Physciaceae]
  1. Skorepa et al. (1977) – Allegany Co., on deciduous trees.
  2. Skorepa et al. (1979) – on bark, calcareous rock.
  3. E.G. Worthley Herbarium - Lichens of Soldiers Delight; Baltimore Co., St. Thomas Cemetery, on gravestone.
290. Physcia aipolia (Ehrh. ex Humb.) Fürnr. var. aipolia [Physciaceae]
  1. Skorepa et al. (1977) – Worcester Co., on deciduous trees.
  2. Skorepa et al. (1979) – on bark.
  3. Biechele (2002) – lower eastern shore of Maryland.
  4. E.G. Worthley Herbarium - Lichens of Soldiers Delight; Frederick Co., Cunningham Falls.
  5. E.C. Uebel Herbarium – Carroll Co., Liberty Reservoir, on bark; Baltimore Co., on Norway Maple.
291. Physcia americana G. Merr. [Physciaceae]
  1. Syn.: Physcia tribacoides Nyl.
  2. Skorepa et al. (1977) – Worcester Co., on deciduous trees.
  3. Skorepa et al. (1979) – on bark, acidic rock, calcareous rock.
  4. E.G. Worthley Herbarium - Baltimore Co., Grace Methodist Church, Gunpowder River, on Tulip Tree; Frederick Co., Cunningham Falls.
  5. Lendemer & Knapp (2007) - (2. Idylwild), (5. Hickory Pt.)
292. Physcia millegrana Degel. [Physciaceae]
  1. Skorepa et al. (1977) – Garrett Co., on oak.
  2. Skorepa et al. (1979) – on bark, acidic rock.
  3. Biechele (2002) – lower eastern shore of Maryland.
  4. E.G. Worthley Herbarium - Calvert Co.; Wicomico Co.; Carroll Co., Falls Realty Company, on cement steps.
  5. E.C. Uebel Herbarium – Prince Georges Co., on dead limb; Carroll Co., Liberty Reservoir, on bark.
  6. Lendemer & Knapp (2007) - (2. Idylwild)
293. Physcia phaea (Tuck.) J.W. Thomson [Physciaceae]
  1. Skorepa et al. (1977) – Baltimore Co., (collected by Plitt 1909)
  2. Skorepa et al. (1979) – on acidic rock.
294. Physcia pseudospeciosa J.W. Thomson [Physciaceae]
  1. Skorepa et al. (1977) – Baltimore Co., on acid rocks.
  2. Skorepa et al. (1979) – on acidic rock.
  3. E.G. Worthley Herbarium - Baltimore Co., near Gunpowder River, on vertical acidic rocks.
295. Physcia pumilior R.C. Harris [Physciaceae]
  1. Lendemer & Knapp (2007) - (2. Idylwild)
296. Physcia stellaris (L.) Nyl. [Physciaceae]
  1. Skorepa et al. (1977) – Baltimore Co., on oak.
  2. Skorepa et al. (1979) – on bark.
  3. Biechele (2002) – lower eastern shore of Maryland.
  4. E.C. Uebel Herbarium – Baltimore Co., on bark of Norway Maple; Prince George's Co., on bark.
297. Physcia subtilis Degel. [Physciaceae]
  1. Skorepa et al. (1977) – Montgomery Co., on rock ledges.
  2. Skorepa et al. (1979) – on acidic rock.
  3. E.G. Worthley Herbarium - Frederick Co., Cunningham Falls.
298. Physciella chloantha (Ach.) Essl. [Physciaceae]
  1. Syn.: Physcia luganensis Mereschk.
  2. Skorepa et al. (1977) – Queen Anne's Co., on cement bridge.
  3. Skorepa et al. (1979) – on bark, cement.
  4. E.C. Uebel Herbarium – Prince George's Co., along bike path, on concrete; on tree branch.
299. Physconia detersa (Nyl.) Poelt [Physciaceae]
  1. Skorepa et al. (1979) – on bark, calcareous rock, cement.
  2. E.G. Worthley Herbarium - Lichens of Soldiers Delight; Baltimore Co., Green Spring Valley, on brick wall; on old cement bridge.
300. Placidium arboreum (Schwein. ex Michener) Lendemer [Verrucariaceae]
  1. Syn.: Dermatocarpon tuckermanii (Rav.) Zahlbr.; Placidium tuckermanii (Ravenel ex Mont.) Breuss
  2. Skorepa et al. (1977) – Allegany Co., base of White Oak.
  3. Skorepa et al. (1979) – on bark.
  4. E.G. Worthley Herbarium - Allegany Co., Green Ridge State Forest, on base of White Oak.
301. Placidium lachneum (Ach.) Breuss [Verrucariaceae]
  1. E.G. Worthley Herbarium - Lichens of Soldiers Delight.
302. Placynthiella uliginosa (Schrader) Coppins & P. James [Agyriaceae]
  1. Syn.: Lecidea uliginosa (Schrad.) Ach.
  2. Skorepa et al. (1977) – Dorchester Co., on oak trunk.
  3. Skorepa et al. (1979) – on bark.
  4. Biechele (2002) – lower eastern shore of Maryland.
  5. Lendemer & Knapp (2007) - (2. Idylwild)
303. Placynthium nigrum (Hudson) Gray [Placynthiaceae]
  1. Skorepa et al. (1977) – Garrett Co., on block of cement.
  2. Skorepa et al. (1979) – on calcareous rock, cement.
  3. E.G. Worthley Herbarium - Baltimore Co., St. Thomas Church Cemetery, on rock wall.
304. Platismatia tuckermanii (Oakes) Culb. & C. Culb. [Parmeliaceae]
  1. Skorepa et al. (1977) – Garrett Co., on sandstone boulder.
  2. Skorepa et al. (1979) – on bark, acidic rock, wood
305. Polysporina simplex (Davies) Vezda [Acarosporaceae]
  1. Syn.: Sarcogyne simplex (Davies) Nyl.
  2. Skorepa et al. (1979) – on acidic rock.
  3. E.G. Worthley Herbarium - Howard Co., on rock outcrop.
306. Porina cestrensis (Tuck. ex Michener) Müll. Arg. [Trichotheliaceae]
  1. Skorepa et al. (1979) – on bark.
307. Porina heterospora (Fink ex J. Hedrick) R.C. Harris [Trichotheliaceae]
  1. Lendemer & Knapp (2007) - (5. Hickory Pt.), (6. Pocomoke)
308. Porpidia albocaerulescens (Wulfen) Hertel & Knoph [Porpidiaceae]
  1. Syn.: Lecanora albocaerulescens (Wulf.) Ach.
  2. Skorepa et al. (1977) – Lichens of Soldiers Delight.
  3. Skorepa et al. (1979) – on acidic rock.
  4. E.G. Worthley Herbarium - Baltimore Co., near small bridge, on Wissahickon schist; Frederick Co.; Garrett Co., on rocks along Big Run.
  5. E.C. Uebel Herbarium – Baltimore Co., Liberty Reservoir, on sandstone boulder.
309. Porpidia crustulata? (Ach.) Hertel & Knoph [Porpidiaceae]
  1. E.C. Uebel Herbarium – Lichens of Soldiers Delight.
310. Porpidia macrocarpa (DC.) Hertel & A. J. Schwab [Porpidiaceae]
  1. Syn.: Lecidea macrocarpa (DC.) Steud.
  2. Skorepa et al. (1977) – Garrett Co., on sandstone.
  3. Skorepa et al. (1979) – on acidic rock.
311. Protoblastenia rupestris (Scop.) J. Steiner [Psoraceae]
  1. Skorepa et al. (1979) – on calcareous rock, cement.
312. Pseudevernia consocians (Vainio) Hale & Culb. [Parmeliaceae]
  1. Syn.: Parmelia furfuracea (L.) Ach.
  2. Skorepa et al. (1977) – Garrett Co., on upper branches of Hemlock.
  3. Skorepa et al. (1979) – on bark.
  4. E.G. Worthley Herbarium - Baltimore Co., Owings Mills.
313. Pseudosagedia cestrensis (Tuck. ex E. Michener) R.C. Harris [Porinaceae]
  1. Lendemer & Knapp (2007) - (2. Idylwild)
314. Pseudosagedia raphidosperma (Müll. Arg.) R.C. Harris [Porinaceae]
  1. Lendemer & Knapp (2007) - (4. Sharptown)
315. Psora decipiens (Hedwig) Hoffm. [Psoraceae]
  1. Syn.: Lecidea decipiens (Hedwig) Ach.
  2. Skorepa et al. (1979) – on soil.
316. Psora russellii (Tuck.) A. Schneider [Psoraceae]
  1. Syn.: Lecidea russellii Tuck.
  2. Skorepa et al. (1977) – Frederick Co., on conglomerate boulders.
  3. Skorepa et al. (1979) – on calcareous rock.
317. Psorotichia schaereri (A. Massal.) Arnold [Lichinaceae]
  1. Skorepa et al. (1979) – on cement.
318. Psorula rufonigra (Tuck.) Gotth. Schneider [Psoraceae]
  1. Syn.: Lecidea rufonigra (Tuck.) Nyl.
  2. Skorepa et al. (1977) – Lichens of Soldiers Delight.
  3. Skorepa et al. (1979) – on acidic rock.
319. Punctelia appalachensis (Culb.) Krog [Parmeliaceae]
  1. Syn.: Parmelia appalachensis Culb.
  2. Skorepa et al. (1979) – on bark.
320. Punctelia bolliana (Müll. Arg.) Krog [Parmeliaceae]
  1. Syn.: Parmelia bolliana Müll. Arg.
  2. Skorepa et al. (1979) – on bark.
321. Punctelia borreri (Sm.) Krog [Parmeliaceae]
  1. Syn.: Parmelia borreri (Sm.) Turner
  2. Skorepa et al. (1979) – on bark.
322. Punctelia missouriensis G. Wilh. & Ladd
  1. Lendemer & Knapp (2007) - (2. Idylwild)
323. Punctelia perreticulata (Räsänen) G. Wilh. & Ladd [Parmeliacae]
  1. Syns.: Punctelia subrudecta (Nyl.) Krog, Parmelia subrudecta Nyl.
  2. Skorepa et al. (1977) – Lichens of Soldiers Delight.
  3. Skorepa et al. (1979) – on bark, acidic rock.
  4. Biechele (2002) – lower eastern shore of Maryland.
  5. E.G. Worthley Herbarium - Lichens of Soldiers Delight; Baltimore Co., Owings Mills, on bark.
  6. E.C. Uebel Herbarium – Lichens of Soldiers Delight; Baltimore Co., on bark of Norway Maple.
  7. Lendemer & Knapp (2007) - (4. Sharptown)
324. Punctelia rudecta (Ach.) Krog [Parmeliaceae]
  1. Syn.: Parmelia rudecta Ach.
  2. Skorepa et al. (1977) – Caroline Co., on trunks of trees.
  3. Skorepa et al. (1979) – on bark, acidic rock.
  4. Biechele (2002) – lower eastern shore of Maryland.
  5. E.G. Worthley Herbarium - Lichens of Soldiers Delight; Baltimore Co., Ivy Mill Road, on bark; Calvert Co.; Wicomico Co.; Carroll Co., on bark of Tulip Tree.
  6. E.C. Uebel Herbarium – Prince George's Co., on dead limb; Carroll Co., Liberty Reservoir, on bark.
  7. Lendemer & Knapp (2007) - (1. Millington), (5. Hickory Pt.), (6. Pocomoke)
325. Pycnothelia papillaria Dufour [Cladoniaceae]
  1. Skorepa et al. (1977) – Prince George's Co., along dirt road.
  2. Skorepa et al. (1979) – on soil.
  3. Biechele (2002) – lower eastern shore of Maryland.
  4. E.C. Uebel Herbarium – Lichens of Soldiers Delight.
326. Pyrenula pseudobufonia (Rehm) R.C. Harris [Pyrenulaceae]
  1. Syn.: Pyrenula neglecta R.C. Harris
  2. Skorepa et al. (1979) – on bark.
  3. Lendemer & Knapp (2007) - (2. Idylwild), (5. Hickory Pt.)
327. Pyrenula punctella Trevis. [Pyrenulaceae]
  1. Lendemer & Knapp (2007) - (5. Hickory Pt.), (6. Pocomoke)
328. Pyrenula subelliptica (Tuck.) R.C. Harris [Pyrenulaceae]
  1. Syn.: Pyrenula imperfecta (Ellis & Everh.) R.C. Harris
  2. Skorepa et al. (1979) – on bark.
329. Pyrrhospora varians (Ach.) R.C. Harris [Lecanoraceae]
  1. Syn.: Lecidea varians Ach.
  2. Skorepa et al. (1977) – Worcester Co., on twigs of Myrica.
  3. Skorepa et al. (1979) – on bark.
  4. Lendemer & Knapp (2007) - (2. Idylwild), (5. Hickory Pt.), (6. Pocomoke)
330. Pyxine caesiopruinosa (Tuck.) Imshaug [Physciaceae]
  1. Skorepa et al. (1977) – Howard Co., on tree.
  2. Skorepa et al. (1979) – on bark.
  3. E.G. Worthley Herbarium - Baltimore Co., on bark of Juglans nigra; Carroll Co., on bark of Juglans nigra.
331. Pyxine sorediata (Ach.) Mont. [Physciaceae]
  1. Skorepa et al. (1977) – Garrett Co., on oak.
  2. Skorepa et al. (1979) – on bark.
  3. Biechele (2002) – lower eastern shore of Maryland.
  4. E.G. Worthley Herbarium – Frederick Co.; Baltimore Co., growing on a sterile crust, Pertusaria?
  5. E.C. Uebel Herbarium – Baltimore Co., Liberty Reservoir, on tree root; Ridge Road, on bark Norway Maple.
  6. Lendemer & Knapp (2007) - (1. Millington), (2. Idylwild), (4. Sharptown)
332. Pyxine subcinerea Stirton [Physciaceae]
  1. E.C. Uebel Herbarium – Prince George's Co., on oak bark; Baltimore Co., on maple bark.
333. Ramalina americana? Hale [Ramalinaceae]
  1. Biechele (2002) – lower eastern shore of Maryland.
334. Ramalina fastigiata (Pers.) Ach. [Ramalinaceae]
  1. Skorepa et al. (1977) – Worcester Co., on branches of deciduous trees.
  2. Skorepa et al. (1979) – on bark.
335. Ramalina willeyi R. Howe [Ramalinaceae]
  1. Skorepa et al. (1977) – Worcester Co., on branches of deciduous trees.
  2. Biechele (2002) – lower eastern shore of Maryland.
336. Ramonia microspora Vězda [Gyalectaceae]
  1. Lendemer & Knapp (2007) - (2. Idylwild)
337. Rhizocarpon concentricum (Davies) Beltr. [Rhizocarpaceae]
  1. E.G. Worthley Herbarium - Garrett Co., Swallow Falls State Forest, on sandstone.
338. Rhizocarpon eupetraeum (Nyl.) Arnold [Rhizocarpaceae]
  1. Syn.: Rhizocarpon intermedium Degel.
  2. Skorepa et al. (1979) – on acidic rock.
339. Rhizocarpon geographicum (L.) DC. [Rhizocarpaceae]
  1. Skorepa et al. (1979) – on acidic rock.
340. Rhizocarpon obscuratum (Ach.) A. Massal. [Rhizocarpaceae]
  1. Skorepa et al. (1977) – Baltimore Co., on rock outcrop.
  2. Skorepa et al. (1979) – on acidic rock.
341. Rhizoplaca chrysoleuca (Sm.) Zopf [Lecanoraceae]
  1. Syn.: Lecanora rubina (Vill.) Ach.; Lecanora chrysoleuca (Sm.) Ach.
  2. Skorepa et al. (1977) – Montgomery Co., on rock ledges.
  3. Skorepa et al. (1979) – on acidic rock.
  4. E.G. Worthley Herbarium - Frederick Co., Mt. Catoctin Park; Montgomery Co., Great Falls, on rocks.
342. Rimelia subisidiosa (Müll. Arg.) Hale & Fletcher [Parmeliaceae]
  1. Syn.: Parmelia subisidiosa (Müll. Arg.) C.W. Dodge
  2. Skorepa et al. (1979) – on bark.
343. Rinodina applanata H. Magn. [Physciaceae]
  1. Skorepa et al. (1979) – on bark.
344. Rinodina ascociscana Tuck. [Physciaceae]
  1. Skorepa et al. (1979) – on bark.
345. Rinodina exigua (Ach.) Gray [Physciaceae]
  1. Skorepa et al. (1979) – on bark.
346. Rinodina ochrocea Willey ex Fink [Physciaceae]
  1. Skorepa et al. (1979) – on acidic rock.
347. Rinodina oxydata (A. Massal.) A. Massal. [Physciaceae]
  1. Skorepa et al. (1979) – on acidic rock.
348. Rinodina papillata H. Magn. [Physciaceae]
  1. Skorepa et al. (1979) – on bark.
349. Rinodina subminutaH. Magn. [Physciaceae]
  1. Skorepa et al. (1979) – on bark.
350. Sarcogyne clavus (DC.) Kremp. [Acarosporaceae]
  1. Skorepa et al. (1979) – on acidic rock.
351. Sarcogyne regularis Körber [Acarosporaceae]
  1. Skorepa et al. (1979) – on calcareous rock.
  2. E.C. Uebel Herbarium – Prince George's Co., Greenbelt, on hill of concrete.
352. Sarcosagium campestre (Fr.) Poetsch & Schiedem. [Acarosporaceae]
  1. Syn.: Biatorella campestris (Fr.) Almq.
  2. Skorepa et al. (1979) – on soil.
353. Schismatomma glaucescens (Nyl. ex Willey) R.C. Harris [Roccellaceae]
  1. Lendemer & Knapp (2007) - (4. Sharptown)
354. Scoliciosporum chlorococcum (Stenh.) Vezda [Lecanoraceae]
  1. Syn.: Bacidia chlorococca (Graeve ex Stizenb.) Lett.
  2. Skorepa et al. (1977) – Montgomery Co., on oak.
  3. Skorepa et al. (1979) – on bark.
  4. E.G. Worthley Herbarium - Worcester Co., Milburn Landing.
  5. E.C. Uebel Herbarium – Baltimore Co., Liberty Reservoir, on bark of Acer rubrum.
  6. Lendemer & Knapp (2007) - (2. Idylwild)
355. Scoliciosporum umbrinum (Ach.) Arnold [Lecanoraceae]
  1. Syn.: Bacidia umbrina (Ach.) Bausch
  2. Skorepa et al. (1977) – Garrett Co., on aspens.
  3. Skorepa et al. (1979) – on acid rock.
356. Sphinctrina turbinata (Pers ex Fr.) de Not. [Sphinctrinaceae]
  1. E.C. Uebel Herbarium – Carroll Co., Liberty Reservoir, on Aspicilia caesiocinerea.
357. Sticta fuliginosa (Hoffm.) Ach. [Lobariaceae]
  1. E.G. Worthley Herbarium - Frederick Co., along Appalachian Trail, on soil.
358. Teloschistes chrysophthalmus (L.) Th. Fr. [Teloschistaceae]
  1. Skorepa et al. (1979) – on bark.
359. Tephromela atra (Huds.) Hafellner [Bacidiaceae]
  1. Lendemer & Knapp (2007) - (6. Pocomoke)
360. Thelidium minutulum Körber [Verrucariaceae]
  1. Lendemer & Knapp (2007) - (5. Hickory Pt.)
361. Thelotrema monospermum R.C. Harris [Thelotremataceae]
  1. Lendemer & Knapp (2007) - (6. Pocomoke)
362. Thelotrema subtile Tuck. [Thelotremataceae]
  1. Lendemer & Knapp (2007) - (5. Hickory Pt.), (6. Pocomoke)
363. Trapelia coarctata (Sm.) M. Choisy [Agyriaceae]
  1. Syn.: Lecidea coarctata (Sm.) Nyl.
  2. Skorepa et al. (1979) – on acidic rock.
364. Trapeliopsis flexuosa (Fr.) Coppins & P. James [Agyriaceae]
  1. Syn.: Lecidea aeruginosa Borrer
  2. Skorepa et al. (1977) – Harford Co., on fence post.
  3. Skorepa et al. (1979) – on wood.
  4. E.C. Uebel Herbarium – Prince George's Co., NE Branch of Anacostia River Bike Trail, on weathered fence rail.
  5. Lendemer & Knapp (2007) - (2. Idylwild), (3. Chesapeake)
365. Trapeliopsis granulosa (Hoffm.) Lumbsch [Agyriaceae]
  1. Syn.: Lecidea granulosa (Hoffm.) Ach.
  2. Skorepa et al. (1979) – on soil.
  3. E.G. Worthley Herbarium - Montgomery Co., Great Falls, on timber.
366. Trypethelium virens Tuck. ex Michener [Trypetheliaceae]
  1. Skorepa et al. (1979) – on bark.
  2. E.G. Worthley Herbarium - Calvert Co., on bark.
  3. Lendemer & Knapp (2007) - (4. Sharptown), (5. Hickory Pt.)
367. Tuckermanella fendleri (Nyl.) Essl. [Parmeliaceae]
  1. Syn.: Cetraria fendleri (Nyl.) Tuck.; Tuckermannopsis fendleri (Nyl.) Hale
  2. Skorepa et al. (1977) – Lichens of Soldiers Delight.
  3. Skorepa et al. (1979) – on bark.
  4. Biechele (2002) – lower eastern shore of Maryland.
  5. E.G. Worthley Herbarium - Wicomico Co., Wicomico State Park; on Loblolly Pine; Worcester Co., Milburn Landing, on bark of Loblolly Pines.
368. Tuckermannopsis americana (Sprengel) Hale [Parmeliaceae]
  1. Lendemer & Knapp (2007) - (4. Sharptown)
369. Tuckermannopsis ciliaris (Ach.) Gyelnik [Parmeliaceae]
  1. Syn.: Cetraria ciliaris Ach.
  2. Skorepa et al. (1977) – Lichens of Soldiers Delight.
  3. Skorepa et al. (1979) – on bark.
  4. E.G. Worthley Herbarium - Lichens of Soldiers Delight; Wicomico Co., on bark.
370. Umbilicaria mammulata (Ach.) Tuck. [Umbilicariaceae]
  1. Syn.: Gyrophora dillenii (Tuck.) Müll.
  2. Skorepa et al. (1977) – Garrett Co., on conglomerate.
  3. Skorepa et al. (1979) – on bark, acidic rock.
  4. E.G. Worthley Herbarium - Baltimore Co., Loch Raven, on rock outcrop; Frederick Co., South Mt., on boulders; Montgomery Co., Sugarloaf Mt., on boulders.
371. Umbilicaria muehlenbergii (Ach.) Tuck. [Umbilicariaceae]
  1. Skorepa et al. (1977) – Allegany Co., on rock outcrop.
  2. Skorepa et al. (1979) – on acidic rock.
372. Umbilicaria vellea (L.) Hoffm. [Umbilicariaceae]
  1. Skorepa et al. (1977) – No locality. (collected by Plitt 1912)
  2. Skorepa et al. (1979) – on acidic rock.
373. Usnea filipendula Stirton [Parmeliaceae]
  1. Syn.: Usnea dasypoga (Ach.) Rohl.
  2. Skorepa et al. (1977) – Garrett Co., (collected by Smith).
  3. Skorepa et al. (1979) – on bark.
374. Usnea mutabilis Stirton [Parmeliaceae]
  1. Skorepa et al. (1977) – Worcester Co., on pines.
  2. Skorepa et al. (1979) – on bark.
  3. Biechele (2002) – lower eastern shore of Maryland.
  4. E.G. Worthley Herbarium - Worcester Co., Pocomoke State Park, on Taxodium distichum.
375. Usnea pensylvanica Motyka [Parmeliaceae]
  1. Lendemer & Knapp (2007) - (2. Idylwild), (6. Pocomoke)
376. Usnea strigosa (Ach.) Eaton [Parmeliaceae]
  1. Skorepa et al. (1977) – Worcester Co., on deciduous trees.
  2. Biechele (2002) – lower eastern shore of Maryland.
  3. E.G. Worthley Herbarium – Worcester Co.; Calvert Co, Battle Creek Cypress Swamp; St. Mary's Co.; Wicomico Co.
  4. E.C. Uebel Herbarium – Baltimore Co., Ridge Rd., on bark of Norway Maple.
  5. Lendemer & Knapp (2007) - (6. Pocomoke)
377. Usnea strigosa subsp. rubiginea (Michaux) I. Tav. [Parmeliaceae]
  1. Syn.: Usnea rubiginea (Michx.) Massal.
  2. Skorepa et al. (1977) – Worcester Co., on deciduous trees.
  3. Skorepa et al. (1979) – on bark.
378. Usnea subscabrosa Nyl. ex Motyka [Parmeliaceae]
  1. Lendemer & Knapp (2007) - (2. Idylwild), (4. Sharptown), (5. Hickory Pt.), (6. Pocomoke)
379. Usnea trichodea Ach. [Parmeliaceae]
  1. Skorepa et al. (1977) – Worcester Co., on tops of Cypress trees.
  2. Skorepa et al. (1979) – on bark.
  3. Biechele (2002) – lower eastern shore of Maryland.
  4. Lendemer & Knapp (2007) - (6. Pocomoke)
380. Verrucaria calciseda DC. [Verrucariaceae]
  1. Skorepa et al. (1979) – on calcareous rock.
381. Verrucaria fuscella (Turner) Winch [Verrucariaceae]
  1. Skorepa et al. (1979) – on calcareous rock.
382. Verrucaria glaucovirens Grummann [Verrucariaceae]
  1. Syn.: Verrucaria virens Nyl.
  2. Skorepa et al. (1979) – on calcareous rock.
383. Verrucaria muralis Ach. [Verrucariaceae]
  1. Skorepa et al. (1979) – on calcareous rock.
384. Verrucaria nigrescens Pers. [Verrucariaceae]
  1. Skorepa et al. (1977) – Lichens of Soldiers Delight.
  2. Skorepa et al. (1979) – on calcareous rock.
385. Verrucaria pinguicula A. Massal. [Verrucariaceae]
  1. Skorepa et al. (1979) – on calcareous rock.
386. Xanthomendoza fallax (Hepp) Søchting, Kärnefelt & S. Kondr. [Teloschistaceae]
  1. Syn.: Xanthoria fallax (Hepp) Arn.
  2. Skorepa et al. (1977) – Worcester Co., on deciduous trees.
  3. Skorepa et al. (1979) – on bark, cement.
  4. Biechele (2002) – lower eastern shore of Maryland.
387. Xanthomendoza fulva (Hoffm.) Søchting, Kärnefelt & S. Kondr. [Teloschistaceae]
  1. Syn.: Xanthoria fulva (Hoffm.) Poelt & Petutschnig
  2. E.C. Uebel Herbarium – Baltimore Co., Ridge Rd., on bark of Norway Maple.
388. Xanthoparmelia angustiphylla (Gyelnik) Hale [Parmeliaceae]
  1. Syn.: Parmelia hypopsila Müll. Arg. = Xanthoparmelia hypopsila, but N.A. records are Xanthoparmelia angustiphylla.
  2. Skorepa et al. (1977) – Baltimore Co., on rock outcrop.
  3. Skorepa et al. (1979) – on acidic rock.
389. Xanthoparmelia conspersa (Ehrh. ex Ach.) Hale [Parmeliaceae]
  1. Syn.: Parmelia conspersa (Ach.) Ach.
  2. Skorepa et al. (1977) – Garrett Co., on rock outcrop.
  3. Skorepa et al. (1979) – on acidic rock.
  4. E.G. Worthley Herbarium - Lichens of Soldiers Delight; Baltimore Co., Gunpowder River, on rock outcrops; Frederick Co.
390. Xanthoparmelia cumberlandia (Gyelnik) Hale [Parmeliaceae]
  1. Syn.: Parmelia cumberlandia (Gyelnik) Hale
  2. Skorepa et al. (1977) – Baltimore Co., on rocks on hillside.
  3. Skorepa et al. (1979) – on acidic rock.
391. Xanthoparmelia plittii (Gyelnk) Hale [Parmeliaceae]
  1. Syn.: Parmelia plittii Gyelnik
  2. Skorepa et al. (1977) – Washington Co., on rock outcrops.
  3. Skorepa et al. (1979) – on acidic rock.
  4. E.C. Uebel Herbarium – Lichens of Soldiers Delight.
392. Xanthoparmelia subramigera (Gyelnik) Hale [Parmeliaceae]
  1. E.C. Uebel Herbarium – Prince George's Co., Berwyn Heights, on roof shingles (identified by Dr. Richard C. Harris).
393. Xanthoparmelia tasmanica (Hook. f. & Taylor) Hale [Parmeliaceae]
  1. Syn.: Parmelia tasmanica Hook. f. & Taylor
  2. Skorepa et al. (1979) – on acidic rock.
394. Xanthoparmelia viriduloumbrina (Gyelnik) Lendemer [Parmeliaceae]
  1. Syn: Parmelia taractica Kremplh. = Xanthoparmelia taractica (Kremp.) Hale – known from Mexico, but misidentifications for our area; specimens in eastern N.A. are X. viriduloumbrina.
  2. Skorepa et al. (1977) (Parmelia taractica) – Baltimore Co., on serpentine rocks.
  3. Skorepa et al. (1979) (Parmelia taractica) – on acidic rock.
  4. E.G. Worthley Herbarium (Parmelia taractica); Allegany Co. (Parmelia taractica), Green Ridge State Forest, on red shale; Carroll Co. (Parmelia taractica), Church of the Brethren, on stone wall.
395. Xanthoria parietina? (L.) Th. Fr. [Teloschistaceae]
  1. Biechele (2002) – lower eastern shore of Maryland.
