= Allen C. Skorepa =

American lichenologist

Allen Charles Skorepa
- Born: August 25, 1941; Berwyn, Illinois
- Died: September 4, 1998 (aged 57)
- Education: Southern Illinois University; University of Tennessee
- Scientific career
- Fields: Lichenology
- Thesis: Taxonomic and ecological studies on the lichens of Southern Illinois (1973)
- Doctoral advisor: Aaron John Sharp
- Author abbrev. (botany): Skorepa

Allen Charles Skorepa (August 25, 1941 – September 4, 1998) was an American lichenologist, and a specialist on the lichens of Maryland.

== Early life ==
Skorepa was born in Berwyn, Illinois, on August 25, 1941. Allen spent his childhood years in Brookfield, Illinois. He attended Southern Illinois University where he majored in botany with a minor in zoology; he graduated in 1965 with a B.A., followed by an M.A. Degree in Botany in 1967. As a graduate student, he was active in surveying for lichens in southern Illinois.

From 1967 to 1973, Skorepa was a Graduate Assistant at the University of Tennessee, Knoxville and a Staff Assistant in the Department of Botany at Southern Illinois University. He conducted environmental impact studies for the Tennessee Valley Authority and was involved in studying the impact of air pollution on lichens.

Allen studied lichen identification at the University of Tennessee with his doctoral supervisor bryologist Aaron J. Sharp. In 1973 he was awarded a Ph.D. from the University of Tennessee for his dissertation titled "Taxonomic and ecological studies on the lichens of Southern Illinois". It included an important checklist on the macrolichens of the region. During the summer of 1973, Skorepa collected lichens in Alaska.

== Career ==
Skorepa worked closely with scientists such as Donald Windler and Mason Hale.

In the summer of 1976, Skorepa, together with Arnold Norden and Windler contracted for two years by the Power Plant Siting Program of the Maryland Department of Natural Resources to study the use of lichens as indicator organisms for the detection of pollutants. They collected over 3,000 specimens which were deposited in the Towson State University Herbarium (BALT). In the December 1977 issue of Castanea, Skorepa et al. listed 242 species of lichens collected in Maryland.

Further collecting yielded an additional 92 species making a total of 306 species of lichens for Maryland. These 92 species were listed in a 1979 publication that dealt mainly with substrate preferences of the various species.

Skorepa died of a heart attack on September 1, 1998.

== Publications ==
- Skorepa, A. C. 1970. Lichenological records from central and northern Illinois. Ill. State Acad. Sci. Trans. 63 (1): 78–82.
- Skorepa, A. C. 1970. Notes on Physcia pseudospeciosa and Physcia wainioi in eastern North America. Castanea 35 (4): 321–322.
- Skorepa, A. C. 1971. Lichens new to Tennessee. Castanea 36 (1): 63–71.
- Skorepa, A. C., and A. J. Sharp. 1971. Lichens in "packets" of the lacewing larvae (Chrysopidae) [Nodita pavida]. The Bryologist 74 (3): 363–364.
- Skorepa, A. C. 1972. A catalog of the lichens reported from Tennessee. The Bryologist 75 (4): 481–500.
- Skorepa, A. C. 1973. Taxonomic and ecological studies on the lichens of Southern Illinois. PhD dissertation, The University of Tennessee, Knoxville, 248 pp.
- Reyes, C. R. and A. Skorepa. 1974. Contribucion a la flora liquenologica del Macarao, Venezue la. i. [Translation Title: Contribution to the lichen flora of Macarao, Venezuela. I.] The Bryologist 77 (2): 257.
- Skorepa, A. C. and W. H. Nussbaumer. 1975. Occurrence of corticolous lichens in a rural locality prior to operation of a new coal fired power plant [Pollution studies]. J. Tenn. Acad. Sci. 50 (3): 84–90.
- Rogers, K. E. and A. C. Skorepa. 1975. Notes on the lichens of Mississippi (1973/1974). J. Miss. Acad. Sci. 19: 148–153.
- Skorepa, A. C. and D. H. Vitt. 1976. A quantitative study of epiphytic lichen vegetation in relation to SO2 pollution in western Alberta. Information Report Nor-X-161, Northern Forest Research Centre, Edmonton.
- Skorepa, A. C. 1977. Additions to the lichen flora of Illinois. Trans. Ill. State Acad. Sci. 70 (3/4): 370–374.
- Skorepa, A. C., A. W. Norden and D. R. Windler. 1977. Studies on the lichens of Maryland [Annotated checklist]. Castanea 42 (4): 265–279.
- Skorepa, A. C., A. W. Norden and D. R. Windler. 1979. Substrate ecology of lichens in Maryland. Castanea 44 (3): 129–142.
- Douglas, G. W., W. L. Peterson and A. C. Skorepa. 1981. Preliminary checklist of the mosses [Musci] and lichens in the Fort Murray area, Alberta, Canada. Canadian Journal of Botany 59 (8): 1456–1564.
- Skorepa, A. C. 1983. New combinations in the lichen genera Hypotrachyna and Parmelina. Phytologia 53: 445–446.
- Skorepa, A. C. and A. W. Norden. 1984. The rare lichens of Maryland. In A. W. Norden, D. C. Forester & G. H. Fenwick (eds.): Threatened and Endangered Plants and Animals of Maryland. Maryland Natural Heritage Program, Annapolis, pp. 57–73.
- Skorepa, A. C. 1984. "The rediscovery of Phaeophyscia leana". The Bryologist 87 (3): 257.
